= List of presidents of the National Research Council of Canada =

The National Research Council of Canada is a major federal research institution in Canada, founded in 1916 as the Honorary Advisory Council for Scientific and Industrial Research. Originally a loose federation of scientific experts advising the government, it was given an executive body in 1928 (when the first President was appointed) and received funds to establish a laboratory in the same year, which opened in 1932.

== Presidents ==
Name	Term	Scientific background
Henry Marshall Tory	1928-1935	mathematics
A.G.L. McNaughton	1935-1939	civil engineering
C.J. Mackenzie	1939-1952	civil engineering
E.W.R. Steacie	1952-1962	physical chemistry
Bristow Guy Ballard	1962-1967	electrical engineering
W.G. Schneider	1967-1980	pure chemistry
J. Larkin Kerwin	1980-1989	physics
Pierre O. Perron	1989-1994	metallurgy
Arthur Carty	1994-2004	inorganic chemistry
Michael Raymont	2004-2005 (acting)	chemistry
Pierre Coulombe	2005-2010	medicine
John R. McDougall	2010-2016	petroleum engineering
Iain Stewart	2016-2020	political science and marine policy
Mitch Davies	2021–Present	commerce
