= Frank Plummer =

Canadian scientist (1952–2020)

Frank Plummer OC OM FRSC

Interim Chief Public Health Officer of Canada
- In office May 17, 2004 – October 23, 2004
- Prime Minister: Paul Martin
- Succeeded by: David Butler-Jones

Personal details
- Born: December 2, 1952 Winnipeg, Manitoba, Canada
- Died: February 4, 2020 (aged 67) Nairobi, Kenya
- Education: University of Manitoba (MD)
- Occupation: Physician

Francis Allan Plummer OC OM FRSC (2 December 1952 – 4 February 2020) was a Canadian scientist, academic and HIV/AIDS researcher. He was "a recognized specialist in infectious diseases whose work influenced public health policy in Canada and abroad". He was Distinguished Professor Emeritus of Medicine and Medical Microbiology at the University of Manitoba and Scientific Director General, National Microbiology Laboratory.

== Life and career ==
Plummer was born in Winnipeg, Manitoba, Canada. He studied medicine at the University of Manitoba, where he specialized in infectious diseases.

In 1980, he went to Kenya in response to a request from the University of Nairobi for assistance in managing an outbreak of chancroid. While there, in 1982 he began studying AIDS transmission in 1982, and beginning in 1984 was part of a research collaboration in Nairobi between the University of Manitoba and the University of Nairobi studying sexually transmitted infections. His research described the heterosexual epidemiology of HIV, the increased risk of HIV infection in men associated with previous chancroid infection and of male circumcision in reducing such risk, and identified immunological and genetic features shared by a group of female sex workers who demonstrated immunity to HIV.

On returning to Canada in 1999, he became senior scientific advisor to the Public Health Agency of Canada, director general of the Centre for Infectious Disease Prevention and Control, and scientific director general of the National Microbiology Laboratory, where he remained for 13 years, leading the Canadian laboratory response to SARS and the H1N1 pandemic and overseeing the development of the successful VSV EBOV vaccine for Ebola viral hemorrhagic fever.

Among his other research, Plummer discovered a human parvovirus that causes a disease resembling erythema infectiosum, which has played an important role in development of adeno-associated virus gene therapy. At the time of his death, he was working to develop an HIV vaccine.

== Honours ==
In 2006, Plummer was made an Officer of the Order of Canada. In 2009, he was made a Member of the Order of Manitoba in recognition for being "an internationally renowned physician-scientist and expert in infectious diseases who has significantly contributed to global health". In 2014, he was awarded the Killam Prize for AIDS research. In 2012, he was awarded the Royal Society of Canada's McLaughlin Medal, awarded "for important research of sustained excellence in medical science". He was the recipient of the Canada Gairdner Wightman Award in 2016. Plummer had honorary degrees from the University of Calgary, McMaster University, and the University of Windsor.

== Private life and death ==
Plummer had three daughters to his first marriage, and later married to Dr. Jo Kennelly who has 3 children, and lived in Toronto.

In 2012, Plummer developed liver failure due to alcoholism; he underwent a liver transplant and as part of an experimental trial was the first recipient in North America of deep brain stimulation for alcohol-use disorder, in December 2018.

He died of a heart attack on 4 February 2020, while visiting Nairobi for the 40th anniversary of the HIV research collaboration.
