= Caroline Colijn =

Canadian mathematician and epidemiologist

Caroline Colijn FRSC
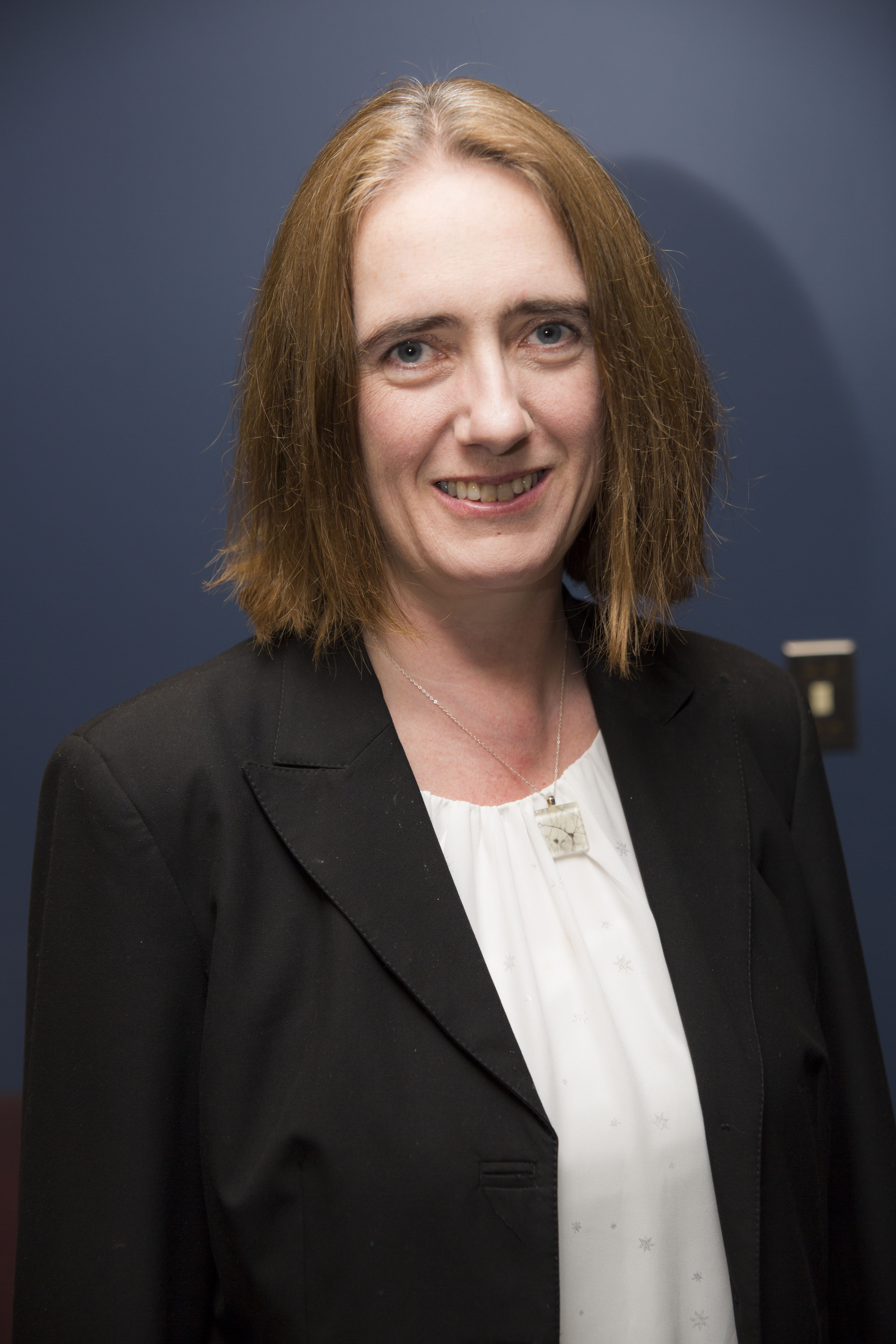
- Colijn in 2017

Academic background
- Education: BSc., mathematics and physics, University of British Columbia; MES., environmental studies, 2000, York University; PhD., mathematics, 2002, University of Waterloo
- Thesis: The de Broglie-Bohm causal interpretation of quantum mechanics and its application to some simple systems. (2003)
- Doctoral advisor: Edward R. Vrscay

Caroline Colijn FRSC is a Canadian mathematician and epidemiologist. She is a Tier 1 Canada Research Chair in Mathematics for Infection, Evolution and Public Health at Simon Fraser University (SFU).

== Early life and education ==
Colijn earned her undergraduate degree from the University of British Columbia before enrolling at York University for her Master's degree in environmental studies and the University of Waterloo for her PhD. She completed her post-doctoral training with Michael Mackey at McGill University and later studied epidemiology with Megan Murray at the Harvard T.H. Chan School of Public Health.

== Career ==
Following her post-doctoral training, Colijn joined the University of Bristol's Department of Engineering Maths until 2011 when she moved to Imperial College London. While at Imperial College London, Colijn earned an Engineering and Physical Sciences Research Council Fellowship in order to study how to improve scientists ability to infer the ecological processes shaping a pathogen's evolution.

In 2017, the Government of Canada announced the hiring of four Canada 150 Research Chairs, including Colijn. The program's initiative was to "enhance Canada's reputation as a global centre for science, research and innovation excellence" and Colijn's focus at Simon Fraser University (SFU) was on making "connections between mathematics and public health, using diverse data to understand how pathogens adapt and spread."

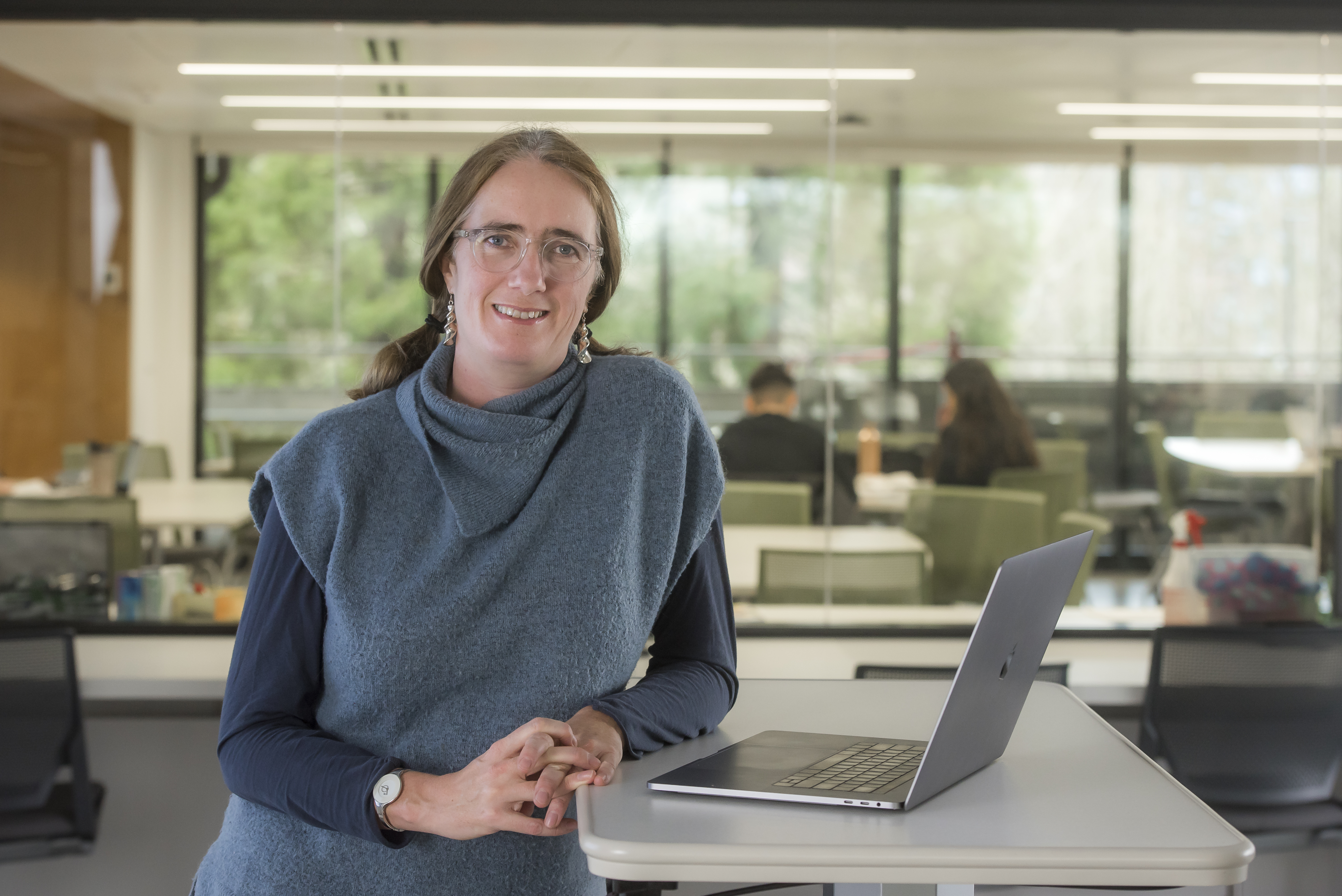
Colijn in 2020

In February 2020, Colijn, Jukka Corander, and Nick Croucher published a study in the journal Nature Microbiology regarding vaccines. They proposed a new method for choosing the best vaccine to fight and eliminate certain bacterial strains using genomic data and mathematical modelling.

During the COVID-19 pandemic in British Columbia, Colijn was awarded a Genome British Columbia grant to map the spread of COVID-19 in British Columbia. Leading a group of researchers, Colijn used the grant to measure how successful and effective British Columbia's health policy measures in lowering the risk of COVID-19. Colijn spoke favorably of the effectiveness of random testing and used mathematical modelling to project high-risk trends in the province, allowing health officers to better determine how to effectively treat the pandemic. Colijn explained that "the role of mathematical modelling in infectious disease epidemiology is to think about the data we have at the population level, groups of people, links between the groups, rates of infection and case counts, and thinking about what that means for the dynamics of this thing going forward." She was also selected by the Chief Science Advisor of Canada Mona Nemer to sit on a country wide science expert panel to advise on COVID-19-related scientific developments. In this role, she published a research paper titled Estimating the impact of COVID-19 control measures using a Bayesian model of physical distancing, which concluded that keeping a physical distance had a direct impact on overall contact rates in the population. In 2025, Colijn was appointed a Tier 1 Canada Research Chair in Mathematics for Infection, Evolution and Public Health.
