= National Advisory Committee on SARS and Public Health =

The National Advisory Committee on SARS and Public Health (NACSARS) was the body that the federal government of Canada commissioned to do a post-mortem inquiry on the SARS epidemic that hit Ontario in March 2003.

The NACSARS report offered 77 recommendations, including that the federal government establish a subdivision that eventually became known as the Public Health Agency of Canada. It called "for the creation of a Canadian agency that would be the equivalent of the U.S. Centers for Disease Control and Prevention and operate at arm's length from Health Canada." Here is the first Canadian mention of a Chief Public Health Officer. It earned the approval of Health Minister Anne McLellan. It also called for the Agency to be given a budget of $700 million by the year 2007.
