= Rowlands Gill =

Village in Tyne and Wear, England

Coordinates: 54.920926°N 1.744103°W

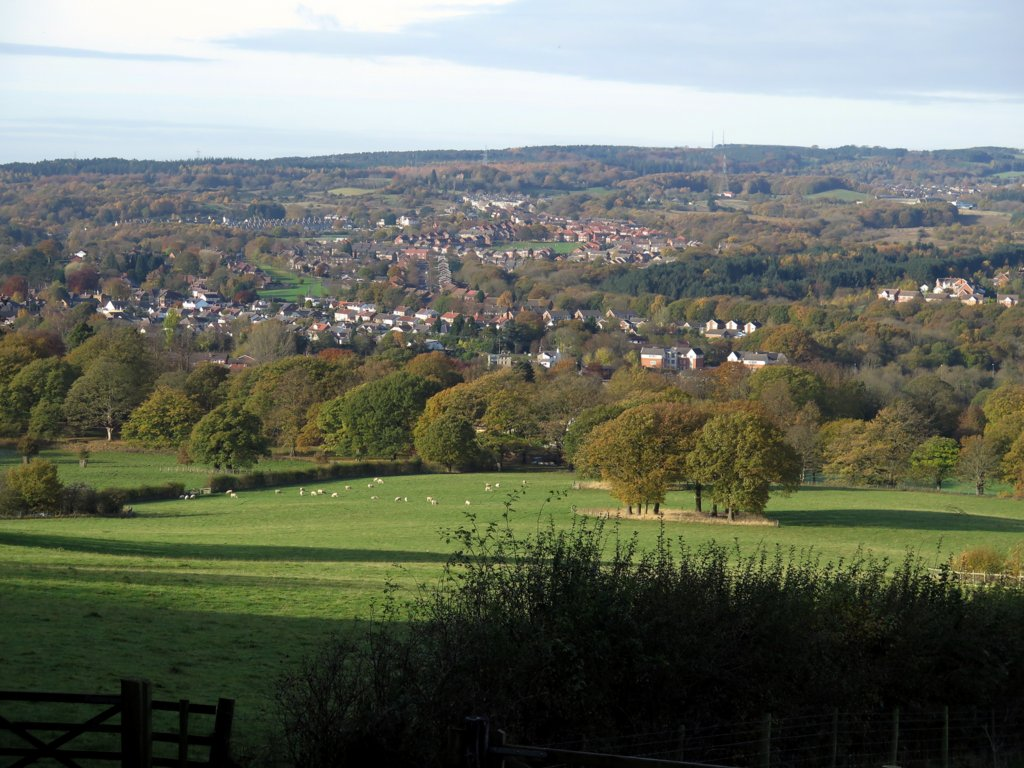
- View from Gibside Estate

- Location within Tyne and Wear
- Population: 6,096 (2011)
- OS grid reference: NZ165585
- Metropolitan borough: Gateshead
- Metropolitan county: Tyne and Wear
- Region: North East
- Country: England
- Sovereign state: United Kingdom
- Post town: ROWLANDS GILL
- Postcode district: NE39
- Dialling code: 01207
- Police: Northumbria
- Fire: Tyne and Wear
- Ambulance: North East
- UK Parliament: Blaydon and Consett

Rowlands Gill is a village on the north bank of the River Derwent, in the Metropolitan Borough of Gateshead, Tyne and Wear, England. The Gibside Estate is near the village.

== History ==
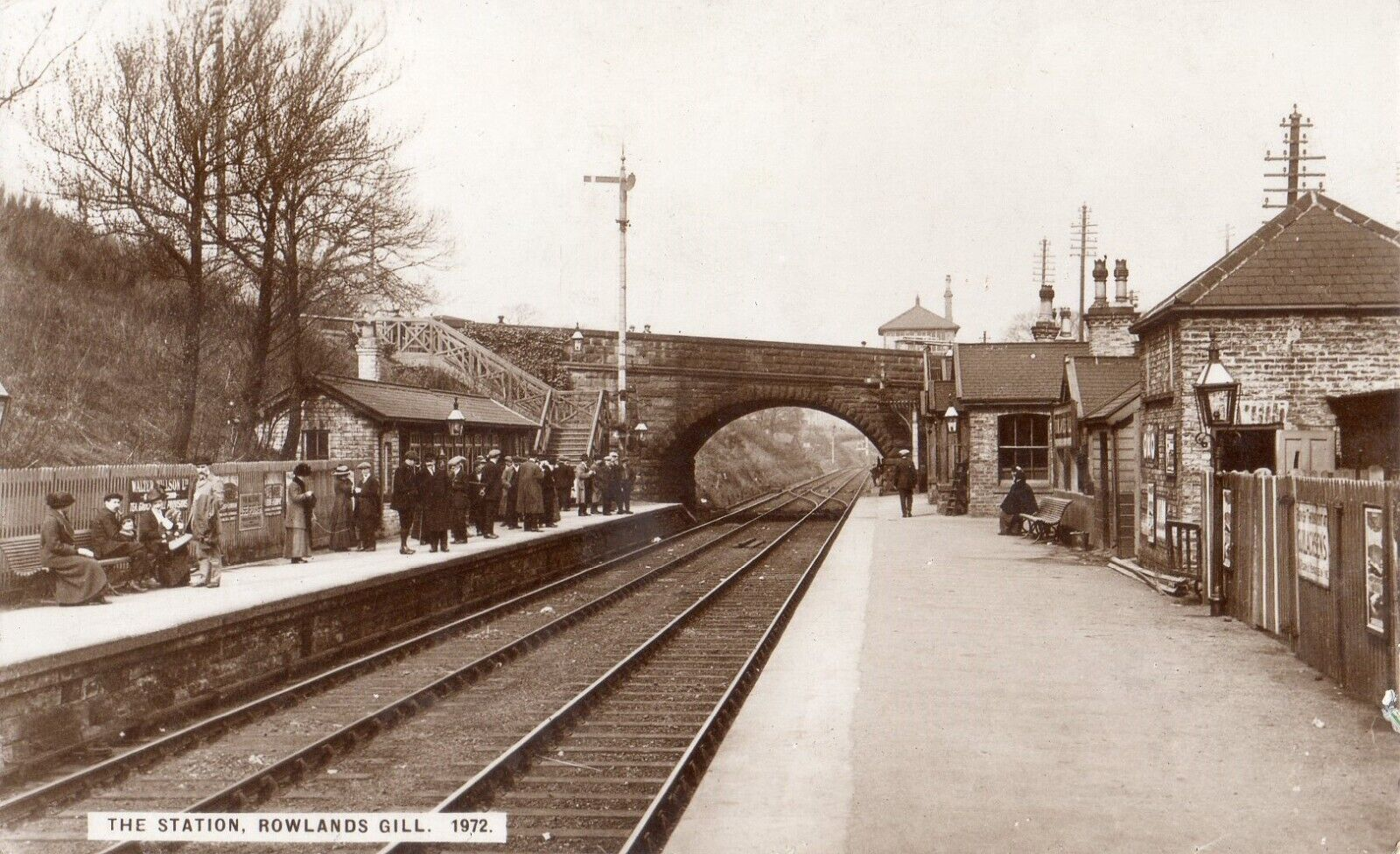
1972 postcard of Rowlands Gill station

With the coming of the Derwent Valley Railway in 1867, Rowlands Gill became a coal mining village and was under Blaydon Urban District, in County Durham, until it was incorporated into the County of Tyne and Wear and the Metropolitan Borough of Gateshead in 1974.

== Governance ==
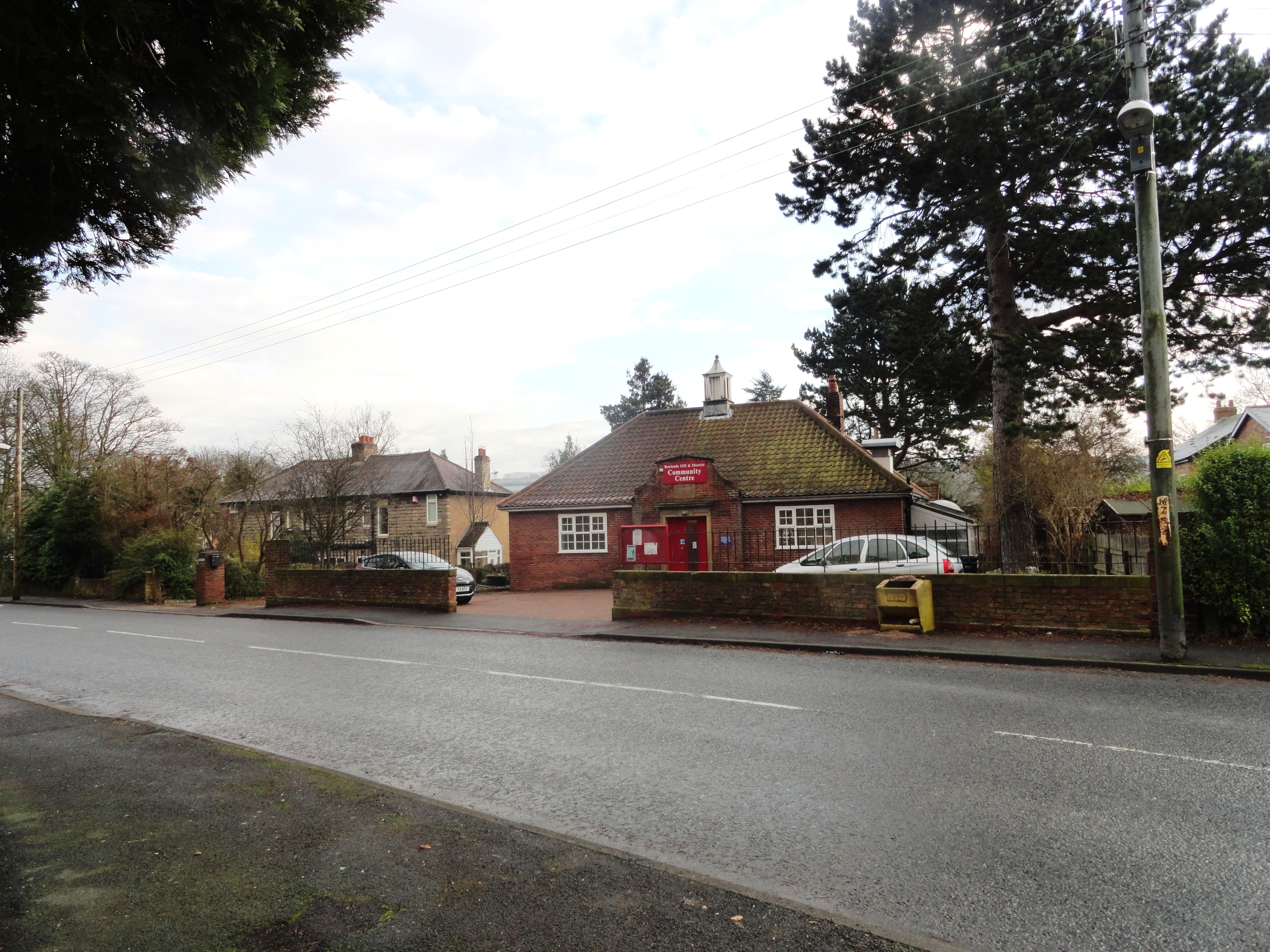
Rowlands Gill District Community Centre

In local government Rowlands Gill is located mainly within the ward of Chopwell and Rowlands Gill. It is served by three councillors, all of whom are Labour councillors, except for the north end at Lockhaugh, which falls within the ward of Winlaton and High Spen, and is served by two Liberal Democrat councillors. Gateshead Council is currently Reform-controlled.

Rowlands Gill is in the parliamentary constituency of Blaydon and Consett. The MP is Labour's Liz Twist.

== Geography ==
Rowlands Gill is situated within Gateshead's Greenbelt, 6 miles southwest of Newcastle just outside of the Tyneside urban sprawl. Transport in the area is mainly focused on Buses as the nearest railway station is Blaydon railway station, 3 miles to the north, and is further away from any Tyne and Wear Metro stations. The village lies on the A694, known as 'Station Road' in the village centre. Another nearby major road is the A692 that passes through the nearby areas of Byermoor and Hobson, County Durham.

== Retail and facilities ==
The village has two licensed premises, Molly’s Bar, previously the Vale of Derwent Working Mens Club and a "micro pub", The Tavern.

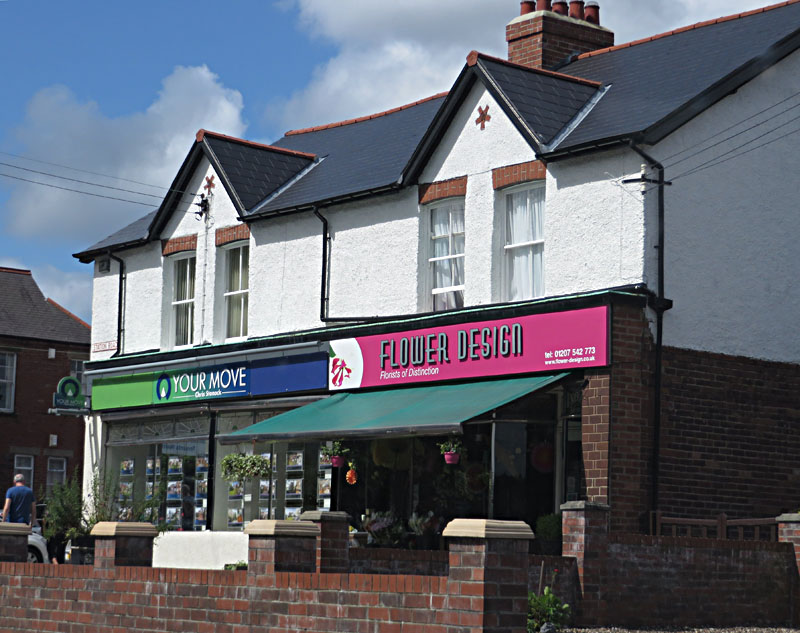
Businesses

The village has a GP with four medical doctors, a dental surgery and a chemist shop. There is a barber, two other hairdressers, two art shops, a gym, a post office, a cafe, a garage, and an appliance shop. It also has an estate agent, an accountant, a bookmaker and a mortician.

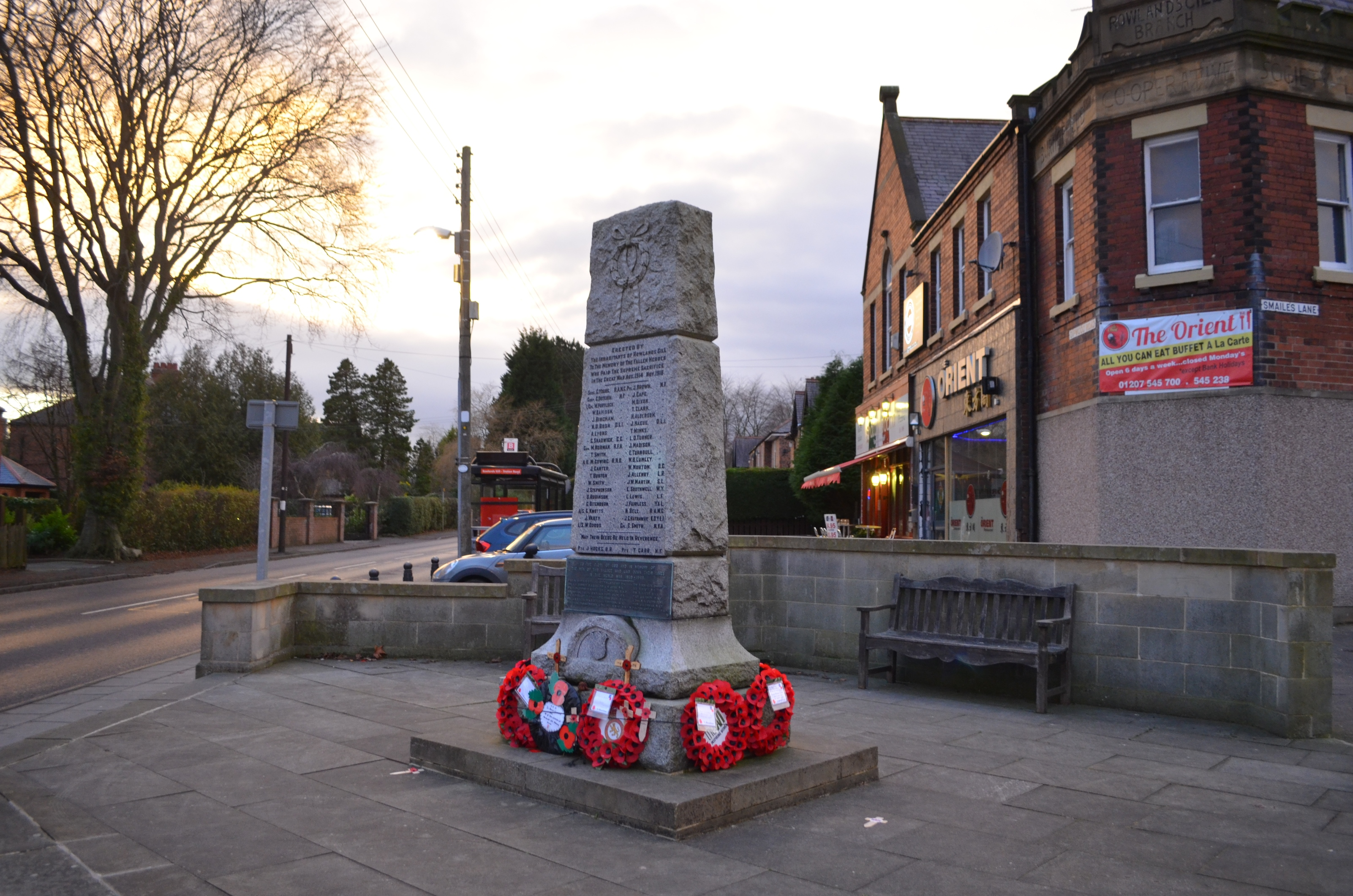
Rowlands Gill War Memorial

There is an Italian restaurant, a Chinese restaurant/take-away, a tea-shop, a sandwich shop, and a fish and chip shop.

A public library is near the village centre. Strathmore Road Methodist Church and St. Barnabas Church of England Church are near the centre.

The war memorial is a Grade II listed building.

== Recreation and education ==
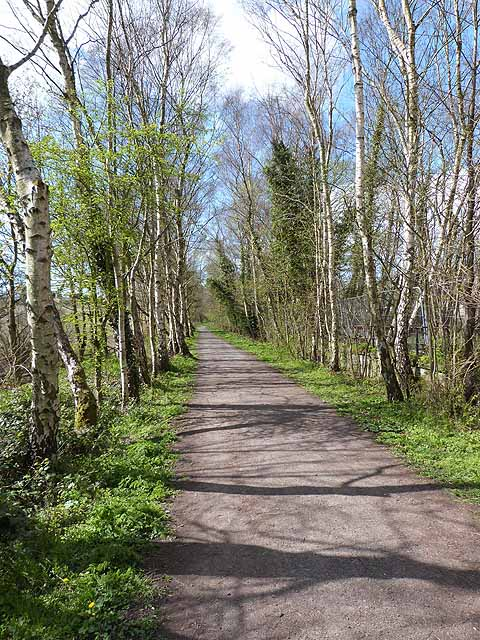
Derwent Walk at Rowlands Gill

Derwent Park provides access to the river, where permit holders can fish. It also has tennis courts, a putting green, recreational fields and playground facilities. The Derwent Country Walk runs through the village along the route of the disused railway line.

The A694 runs through the town. There are frequent bus services to Newcastle City Centre, the MetroCentre and, in the other direction, Blackhall Mill and Consett. Other minor bus routes such as UCall bus service operate.

Rowlands Gill has a primary school, which was rebuilt in 2007 after the previously separate infant and junior schools had merged. The school is a feeder to Thorp Academy. Some parents send their children to St Thomas More Catholic School, Blaydon.

Rowlands Gill and the surrounding Derwent Valley were chosen by the Northern Kites Project as the location for re-introducing red kites in semi-rural areas. The scheme has proved to be a success, with birds being spotted across the west of the borough, from Crawcrook through Rowlands Gill, to Burnopfield and Whickham.

== Notable people ==
These notable people were born in Rowlands Gill or lived there for a significant period:

- Kirsty Wade – athlete, a former resident of the old station-master's house
- Chris Ryan – SAS soldier and author
- Frank Clark – European Cup-winning football player and manager
- Ben Satterley – wrestler currently under contract to All Elite Wrestling, was billed as being from Rowlands Gill when wrestling in the North East.
- Richard Cobbing – athlete, Olympian, former World Games Trampoline champion and World Championship Silver Medallist at the FIS Freestyle World Ski Championships
- Daniel Barlaser – footballer for Middlesbrough FC
- Edward Charlton – British Army soldier awarded the Victoria Cross during World War II
- Arthur Carty – academic and former National Science Adviser to the Government of Canada
- Anthony A. Barrett – Classical scholar and author
- Gracie Cole – trumpeter and band leader
