= Creutzfeldt-Jakob Disease Surveillance System =

Unit of the Public Health Agency of Canada

The Creutzfeldt-Jakob Disease Surveillance System (CJDSS) is a unit of the Public Health Agency of Canada. It studies the various variants of Creutzfeldt-Jakob Disease, and at least as of 2017, assisted "with DNA sequencing, autopsy and case confirmation". As of 2014, the CJDSS conducted "prospective national surveillance for all types of human prion disease in Canada. The main purposes of the CJDSS [were then] to better understand the epidemiology of human prion diseases, to improve the options available for their rapid and accurate diagnosis, and ultimately to protect the health of Canadians by reducing risks of prion disease transmission."

== History ==
CJD deaths in Canada
Year	Deaths	Population	Mortality
1998	24	30,244,982	0.79
1999	32	30,492,106	1.05
2000	35	30,783,969	1.14
2001	30	31,130,030	0.96
2002	36	31,450,443	1.14
2003	29	31,734,851	0.91
2004	44	32,037,434	1.37
2005	44	32,352,233	1.36
2006	44	32,678,986	1.35
2007	39	33,001,076	1.18
2008	49	33,371,810	1.47
2009	53	33,756,714	1.57
2010	38	34,131,451	1.11
2011	51	34,472,304	1.48
2012	63	34,880,248	1.81
2013	51	35,289,003	1.45
2014	56	35,675,834	1.57
2015	52	35,702,707	1.46
2016	64	36,286,400	1.76
2017	86	36,712,658	2.34
2018	80	37,589,262	2.13
2019	78	37,802,043	2.06

The CJDSS was created in 1998 (along with a slew of other OECD national reporting systems) "in response to the widespread outbreak of vCJD in the United Kingdom", and "is a research project that relies on direct CJD reporting by all neurologists, neurosurgeons, neuropathologists, geriatricians, and infectious disease physicians to the" PHAC.

The CJDSS issued its first annual report in 1998.

In 2002, the CJDSS issued a report entitled "Infection Control Guidelines: Classic CJD in Canada".

In July 2003 with the help of Agriculture and Agri-Food Minister Lyle Vanclief who is also an accredited Bachelor of Agriculture and active farmer, the SRM feed ban was imposed by the Canadian Food Inspection Agency (CFIA). This was the first regulatory change to bovine farm practice in Canada after and as a result of the British BSE disaster. Feeding cattle to cattle had been practiced in Canada at least since 1992 when the British culled at least 100,000 cattle in an attempt to control BSE. Then in January 2004, the CFIA "announced that it would enhance its BSE surveillance testing to at least 8,000 cattle during the first year and to 30,000 per year in subsequent years to calculate the prevalence of BSE in Canadian adult cattle. The level and design of this enhanced program continues to be in full accordance with the guidelines recommended by the OIE." As late as 2010, an audit report produced by external management consultant advisors from Ottawa told the Canadian government that the feed bans "will not show results for another five years."

In 2004, the CJDSS, which had up until then been part of Health Canada's Population and Public Health Branch, was incorporated into the newly formed PHAC.

In 2007, the CJDSS issued a report entitled "Classic Creutzfeldt-Jakob Disease in Canada Quick Reference Guide 2007".

In 2010, the CJDSS was evaluated, as part of the evaluation of the Prion Diseases Program of which it forms part.

In 2011, a novel case of CJD that was detected in an immigrant patient from Saudi Arabia and noticed by the CJDSS in the Canada Communicable Disease Report, prompted the Canadian Blood Services and Hema-Quebec to issue deferral orders for blood donors from the middle eastern country.

In 2013, Coulthart et al. described at an academic conference Creutzfeldt-Jakob disease reporting in Canada.

By 2014, "all human prion diseases [were] provincially reportable [at least in Newfoundland and Labrador] and nationally notifiable in Canada."

In 2017, Fan, Deilgat and Speechley wrote that "the role of the CJDSS is to assist in the investigation and diagnosis of suspected cases of CJD in Canada, provide support to patients and health care providers, and ultimately protect the health of Canadians by reducing the risk of CJD transmission."

In budget year 2019–20, the CJDSS advertised that it sought autopsy services in the National Capital Region.

=== Leadership ===
- Michael Coulthart (2010-present)
