= Chief Public Health Officer of Canada =

Canadian government official

- Administratrice en chef de la santé publique du Canada
- Incumbent; Joss Reimer since 1 April 2026
- Public Health Agency of Canada
- Abbreviation: CPHO
- Reports to: Minister of Health
- Appointer: Governor in Council
- Term length: 5 years
- Inaugural holder: David Butler-Jones
- Formation: 2004
- Deputy: Howard Njoo
- Website: www.phac-aspc.gc.ca

The chief public health officer of Canada (CPHO; French: administratrice en chef de la santé publique; ACSP) (Note: When the position is held by a man, the French title is administrateur en chef de la santé publique.) is the lead health professional and primary spokesperson on public health related matters for the Government of Canada. The chief public health officer provides advice to the minister of health and the president of the Public Health Agency of Canada (PHAC), works in collaboration with the agency president in the agency's leadership and management, and works with other departments and levels of government on public health matters. PHAC, along with the CPHO post was established in 2004 amidst the SARS crisis.

The chief public health officer of Canada is Joss Reimer, who was appointed in April 2026, following the retirement of Theresa Tam.

== Overview ==
The CPHO position was created by Carolyn Bennett in her position as Minister of State for Public Health (Canada) in 2004, along with the Public Health Agency of Canada. Per the Public Health Agency of Canada Act (2006), the CPHO holds office "during pleasure for a term not exceeding five years". The CPHO can be reappointed for additional terms.

The CPHO is selected through an open and transparent national competitive process, and is appointed by the Governor-in-Council. The process is merit-based: as per the Public Health Agency of Canada Act, the CPHO must be a qualified public health professional.

== Responsibilities ==
The CPHO is responsible for:

- Providing public health advice to the minister of health and to the president of the Public Health Agency of Canada, and, as appropriate, work with other federal departments and agencies, provincial/territorial governments, the international community, health practitioners and Canadians on public health issues;
- Giving the minister of health an annual report on Canadian public health;
- Providing leadership of the Public Health Agency of Canada;
- Taking a leadership/advocacy role in national public health matters and citizen engagement in public health;
- Taking accountability for health provisions related to official acts (e.g. the Quarantine Act, the Department of Health Act, the Public Health Agency of Canada Act, and the Human Pathogens and Toxins Act); and
- Assuming the role of the federal government spokesperson on public health issues, in particular, during public health emergencies.

During public health emergencies, such as outbreaks or natural disasters, the CPHO is responsible for:

- Working with relevant professionals and officials to plan responses and to provide Canadians with information about plan outbreak responses and how to protect themselves;
- Providing briefings and advice to the president of the Public Health Agency, the minister of health, and others; and
- Communicating public health information to Canadians via different channels.

The chief public health officer was the head of the Public Health Agency of Canada until 2014, in which government of Prime Minister Stephen Harper reorganized the management structure of PHAC through a 2014 omnibus budget bill and instituted a parallel presidential-structure and position to govern the organization, that then could be staffed by non-medical and non-scientific personnel. The NDP health critic said at the time that: "To bury it in an omnibus bill says to me that they don't want people to know about it and they don't want questions," while Health Minister Rona Ambrose said that "the idea for the new structure came from the agency itself," which was led at the time on an interim basis for the previous 16 months by Gregory W. Taylor.

== Areas of focus ==
=== 2017–present ===
Former CPHO Theresa Tam released a vision statement in early 2018. She wishes to pay particular attention to the reduction of health discrepancies in the country, which includes collaborating with and reducing the socioeconomic gap of Indigenous Peoples. Her six areas of focus are currently:

1. The risks of antimicrobial resistance and the correct use of antibiotics;
2. Building healthy environments that reduce health discrepancies;
3. The championing of youth health;
4. The reduction of blood-borne and sexually transmitted infections;
5. The reduction of Tuberculosis in at-risk populations; and
6. Promoting education on substances (especially alcohol, opioids and marijuana), particularly their effects on youth

As CPHO, Tam wrote Fifteen years post-SARS: Key milestones in Canada's public health emergency response, in which she remarked somewhat presciently as it turns out that:

With the current global reality, we must recognize that public health threats that go unchecked anywhere in the world have the potential to very rapidly become a public health threat in Canada.

== List of chief public health officers ==
Howard Njoo is the interim and present CPHO.

List of Chief Public Health Officers of Canada
No.	CPHO	Appointed	Retired	Appointed by
–	Frank Plummer	17 May 2004	23 October 2004	Carolyn Bennett
1	David Butler-Jones	October 23, 2004	June 2013	Carolyn Bennett
2	Gregory W. Taylor	September 24, 2014	December 15, 2016	Rona Ambrose
3	Theresa Tam	June 26, 2017	June 20, 2025	Jane Philpott
–	Howard Njoo (interim)	June 20, 2025	September, 2025	Marjorie Michel
–	Natasha Crowcroft (interim)	September, 2025	April 1, 2026	Marjorie Michel
4	Joss Reimer	April 1, 2026		Marjorie Michel

== List of current provincial chief public health officers ==
List of current provincial/territorial/municipal Chief Public Health Officers of Canada
Province/territory/municipality	CPHO
Alberta	Sunil Sookram
British Columbia	Bonnie Henry
Manitoba	Brent Roussin
New Brunswick	Yves Léger
Newfoundland and Labrador	Janice Fitzgerald
Nova Scotia	Robert Strang
Ontario	Kieran Moore
Prince Edward Island	Heather Morrison
Quebec	Luc Boileau
Saskatchewan	Saqib Shahab
Northwest Territories	Kami Kandola
Nunavut	Ekua Agyemang (interim)
Yukon	Sudit Ranade

== See also ==
- Medical officer of health
- Chief Medical Officer (United Kingdom)
- Chief Medical Officer, Republic of Ireland
- Surgeon General of the United States
- Chief Medical Officer of Health of Ontario
