= Quarantine Act, 2005 =

Act of the Parliament of Canada

Quarantine Act

Parliament of Canada
- Long title: An Act to prevent the introduction and spread of communicable diseases
- Citation: SC 2005, c. 20
- Considered by: House of Commons of Canada
- Considered by: Senate of Canada
- Assented to: May 13, 2005

Legislative history

First chamber:
- Bill citation: Bill C-12
- First reading: October 8, 2004
- Second reading: February 9, 2005
- Third reading: February 10, 2005

Second chamber: Senate of Canada
- First reading: February 10, 2005
- Second reading: March 9, 2005
- Third reading: April 14, 2005
- Status: In force

The Quarantine Act (French: Loi sur la mise en quarantaine) is an act of the Parliament of Canada, which regulates the use of quarantine to prevent the introduction and spread of communicable diseases. Introduced in the aftermath of the 2002–04 SARS outbreak, the act grants the ability to designate quarantine facilities, require health screenings upon arrival or exit of the country, and issue emergency orders that impose conditions or prohibitions on the entry of individuals or imports in order to prevent the spread of communicable diseases. It also imposes fines on those who disobey quarantine officers or quarantine orders. The act was invoked in response to the COVID-19 pandemic.

== History ==
Amid the COVID-19 pandemic in Canada, the act was invoked for two purposes. It was used in order to mandate a quarantine of Canadian travellers who had been repatriated from the pandemic's origin, Wuhan, China. It was also used on March 25, when Minister of Health Patty Hajdu invoked the act effective at midnight that night, to legally require all international travellers (excluding essential workers) returning to Canada to self-isolate for 14 days, prohibiting those who are symptomatic from using public transit to reach a place of self-isolation, and prohibiting self-isolation in settings where they may come in contact with people with pre-existing conditions and the elderly.

On April 10, 2020, the RCMP disclosed it had been asked to enforce the act. Penalties for violations can include a fine of up to $750,000 and imprisonment for six months.

By May 20, police officers had made 2,198 "home visits to make sure Canadians [were] complying with the self-isolation rule when they cross[ed] back into the country". One returning traveller at Pearson International Airport was depicted with a full PPE isolation suit. Justin Trudeau "hint[ed] at new measures to track travellers who cross into Canada once border restrictions start to ease." The CBSA alerts the PHAC "if it suspects a returning traveller won't comply." The PHAC then notifies the national operations centre of the RCMP, who then coordinates with local police forces. Only one person in Richmond, British Columbia, was fined $1,000. The Trudeau government "expanded the Order-in-Council by saying that anyone returning home from abroad without a credible self-isolation plan would be forced to stay at a designated quarantine facility, such as a hotel." Trudeau was puzzled by "those questions on non-essential travel". Chief Public Health Officer Teresa Tam "called the mandatory 14-day quarantine for arrivals a 'cornerstone' of federal pandemic policy." Trudeau said, "Once we get to a point where non-essential travel picks up again in the coming months, I guess, we need to have strong measures in place and we're looking at those closely."

== See also ==
- Emergencies Act
