= Colijn (surname) =

Colijn is a Dutch surname. Notable people with the surname include:

- Anton Colijn (1894–1945), Dutch amateur mountaineer, son of Hendrikus
- Caroline Colijn, Canadian mathematician and epidemiologist
- Helen Colijn (1920–2006), Dutch publicist, daughter of Anton
- Hendrikus Colijn (1869–1944), Dutch politician, twice Prime Minister of the Netherlands
- Luc Colijn (born 1958), Belgian racing cyclist
- Peter Colijn (died 1535), Dutch statesman, and the burgomaster of Amsterdam
- Johannes Colijn (c.1692-1743) Early South African wine maker on farm Hoop op Constansia.

== See also ==
- Colijn de Coter (c. 1440–1445 – c. 1522–1532), an early Netherlandish painter
- David Colijns (1582 – c. 1665), a Dutch Golden Age painter
