= National Emergency Stockpile System =

Canadian healthcare stockpiling agency

The National Emergency Stockpile System (NESS) is a federal Government of Canada response to the needs of the health care system in case of an emergency. It is a responsibility of the Public Health Agency of Canada (PHAC).

== Synopsis ==
The NESS is:

a federally owned stockpile of... medical supplies and equipment managed by the Public Health Agency of Canada. Medical supplies and equipment range from beds and blankets to advanced pediatric ventilators... The National Emergency Stockpile System inventory is stored in 10 federal warehouses and approximately 1,300 additional pre-positioned supply centres across Canada. These pre-positioned sites, which operate under the combined management of the provincial/territorial and federal governments, are intended to respond within 24 hours to a provincial/territorial request... [D]uring the H1N1 pandemic [t]he provinces and territories accessed the System for the following items:

• 135 adult ventilators

• 198,800 masks

The NESS anticipates a pandemic and therefore procures health supplies, such as sanitizers/disinfectants, ventilators and N95 masks. The Federal Budget 2006 allocated $600 million for general pandemic planning and preparedness activities, such as the NESS.

As of May 2020, the NESS was the responsibility of the Vice-President, Health Security Infrastructure Branch at the PHAC. The NESS had fallen on hard times, with a staff of 18 people in normal times, and a budget in 2019 of $3 million. The stockpile was reduced in 2019 from 11 warehouses in nine cities to eight warehouses across six cities.

== History ==
The NESS was established in 1952 when the Cold War was just begun.

Sally Thornton, who was at the time Vice-President, Health Security Infrastructure Branch at the PHAC was quoted in May 2020 to say: "The role has changed to focus more on chemical, biological, radiological and nuclear threats. We began to move away from beds and blankets and increased our holdings of antiviral medications and key treatments." She disclosed that the NESS was not "focused on personal protective equipment and had little of the necessary gear to respond to COVID-19."

== See also ==
- National Antiviral Stockpile
- Strategic National Stockpile
