= National Research Council Canada =

Canadian national research organization

Coordinates: 45.44623°N 75.61698°W

- Conseil national de recherches Canada

- National Research Council Canada Building

Agency overview
- Formed: 1916; 110 years ago
- Jurisdiction: Government of Canada
- Headquarters: Ottawa, Ontario, Canada
- Employees: 4200 (approximately)
- Minister responsible: Mélanie Joly, Minister of Industry
- Agency executive: Mitch Davies, President
- Key document: National Research Council Act
- Website: nrc.canada.ca

The National Research Council Canada (NRC; French: Conseil national de recherches Canada) is the primary national agency of the Government of Canada dedicated to science and technology research and development. It is the largest federal research and development organization in Canada.

The Minister of Industry is responsible for the NRC.

== Mandate ==
NRC is an agency of the Government of Canada, and its mandate is set out in the National Research Council Act.

Under the Act, the NRC is responsible for:

- Undertaking, assisting or promoting scientific and industrial research in fields of importance to Canada;
- Providing vital scientific and technological services to the research and industrial communities;
- Investigating standards and methods of measurement;
- Standardization and certification of scientific and technical apparatus and materials;
- Operating and administering Canadian astronomical observatories;
- Establishing, operating and maintaining a national science library; and
- Publishing and distributing scientific and technical information.

Approximately 4200 people across Canada are employed by the NRC. In addition, the NRC also employs guest workers from universities, companies, and public and private-sector organizations.

== History ==
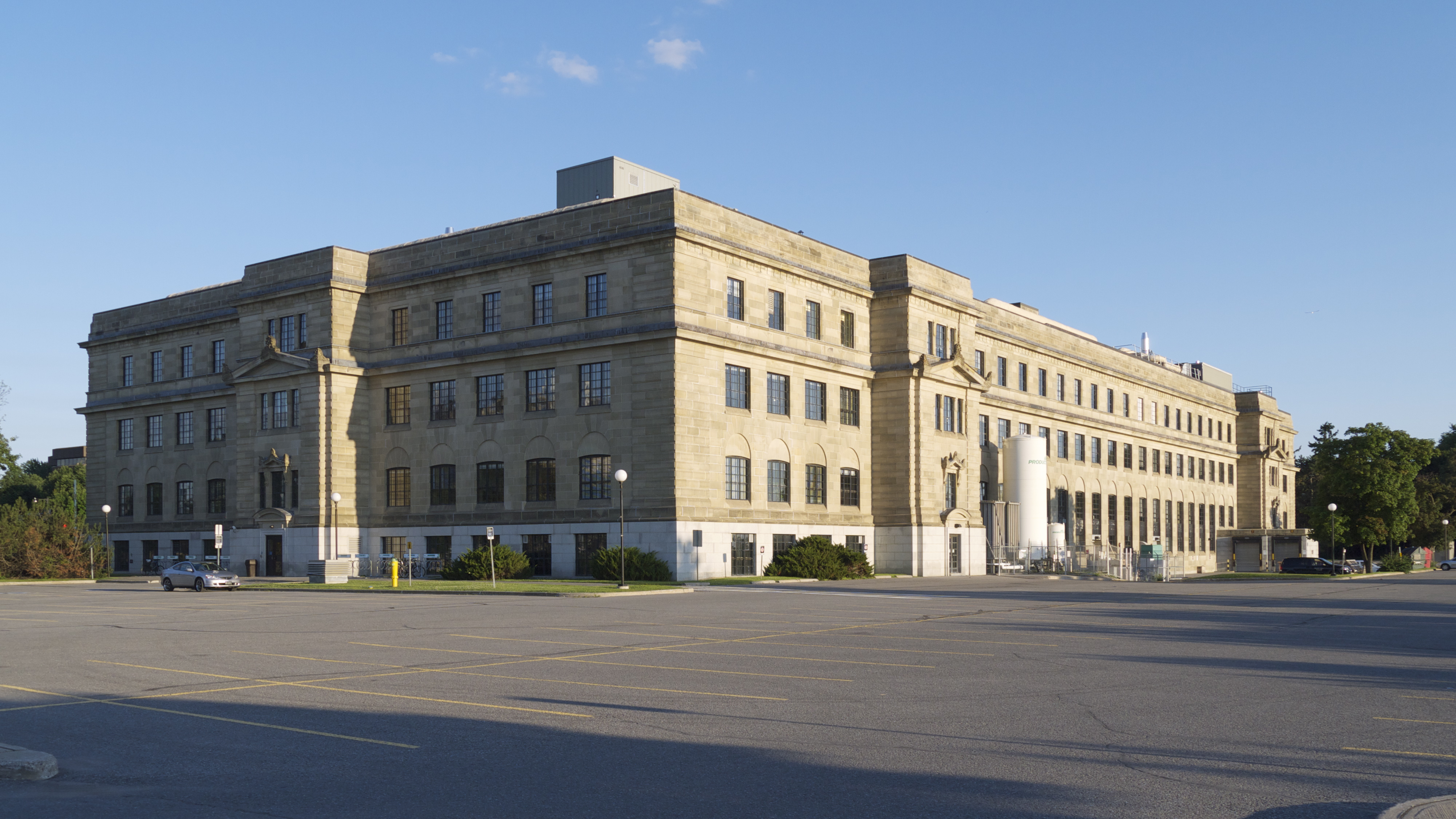
NRC laboratories on Sussex Drive in Ottawa

=== Formation during World War I ===
The National Research Council was established as the Honorary Advisory Council for Scientific and Industrial Research in June 1916, under the pressure of World War I. In both Britain and Canada, the onset of the war had disrupted scientific and industrial supply chains, and drawn political and public attention to a perceived failure of government to coordinate research and development. Following the founding of the British Committee for Scientific and Industrial Research in 1915, the Honorary Council was founded to advise the Canadian government on matters of science and industry.

Within its first years, the Council, chaired by University of Toronto Biochemist Archibald Macallum, focused on scientific solutions to manufacturing, agricultural and energy issues connected to impact of the war. In 1918, The Honorary Council completed a report on the state of Canadian research which criticized the lack of central organization and funding available to Canadian researchers, and proposed a National Research Institute with its own government-run laboratories to conduct research.

=== Interwar period ===
Early on, the Council was commonly referred to as the National Research Council (NRC), and it adopted this as its official name in 1925. Henry Marshall Tory served as the first NRC President from 1928-1935. Early projects for the NRC included research into the fungal grain disease Wheat Rust, the resistance of concrete to deterioration, and the use of lignite coal as a viable fuel source. The Council also provided funding for university scientists conducting research. In 1932, laboratories were built on Sussex Drive in Ottawa and the Medical Research Committee was formed with Dr. Frederick Banting as the inaugural Chair.

=== World War II ===
With the impetus of World War II, the NRC grew rapidly and for all practical purposes, became a military science and weapons research organization. It undertook a number of important projects, which included participation with the United States and United Kingdom, in the development of chemical and germ warfare agents, the explosive RDX, the proximity fuse, radar, and submarine detection techniques. Many inventions and innovations during this period and beyond drew upon the skills of engineer George J. Klein, who is often touted as the most productive inventor in Canada during the 20th century. A special branch, known as the Examination Unit, was involved with cryptology and the interception of enemy radio communications. According to the Canadian Security Intelligence Service website, the NRC headquarters in Ottawa "was a prime espionage target" during the Cold War. The NRC was also engaged in atomic fission research at the Montreal Laboratory, and later the Chalk River Laboratories in Ontario.

=== Post-World War II ===
Post-WWII, the NRC reverted to its pre-war civilian role, and a number of wartime activities were spun off to newly formed organizations. Military research continued under a new organization, the Defence Research Board, while inventions with commercial potential were transferred to the newly formed Canadian Patents and Development Limited; and atomic research went to the newly created Atomic Energy of Canada Limited. Foreign signals intelligence gathering officially remained with the agency when, by Order in Council, the Examination Unit became the Communications Branch of the NRC in 1946. The CBNRC was transferred to the Department of National Defence in 1975, and renamed the Communications Security Establishment. During the 1950s, the medical research funding activities of the NRC were handed over to the newly formed Medical Research Council of Canada.

On 1 May 1978, with the rapid post-war growth of Canadian universities, the NRC's role in university research funding in the natural sciences was passed under the GOSA Act to the Natural Sciences and Engineering Research Council of Canada.

In the 1980s, the NRC was responsible for selecting the first Canadian astronauts. The first Canadian in space, Marc Garneau, flew on the Space Shuttle Challenger on mission STS-41-G in October 1984. The NRC's role in the space program was transferred to the Canadian Space Agency following its foundation in 1989. Budget increases for the NRC were capped at 5%-per year as part of the Expenditure Control Plan of the 1990 federal budget.

=== 21st century ===
From 1994 to 2004, the NRC was led by Arthur Carty whose "energetic leadership and clear vision have made the Council a major player in the development and expansion of new frontiers of scientific exploration." In 2004, Carty was chosen by Prime Minister Paul Martin to serve as the first National Science Advisor of Canada. He was succeeded at NRC by Pierre Coulombe.

In April 2010, John McDougal was appointed President of the NRC by the Harper government The tenure of John McDougall was marked by budget cuts and controversies (see "Controversies" below). Under his, and Minister of State (Science and Technology) Gary Goodyear's leadership, the NRC became a "toolbox for industry" with dented basic-research infrastructure, according to a former Clerk of the Privy Council.

In 2015, Kirsty Duncan was installed as Minister of Science in the new Trudeau government. The focus of the NRC shifted toward partnerships with private and public-sector technology companies, both nationally and internationally. John McDougall left suddenly in 2016 and Iain Stewart became the new President of the NRC.

In August 2020 under Minister of Innovation, Science and Industry Navdeep Bains and President Iain Stewart, the NRC announced it was building the Biologics Manufacturing Centre, a facility that can produce vaccines and other biologics. The construction of the facility was started as a result of the COVID-19 pandemic, and Canada's inability to produce COVID-19 Vaccines.

In September 2020, President Iain Stewart was shuffled to the troubled Public Health Agency of Canada, and in December 2020 Bains named Mitch Davies to fill the vacancy. In October 2021, Iain Stewart returned to his position as President of the National Research Council. In January 2024, Mitch Davies was appointed as President of the National Research Council following the retirement of Iain Stewart.

See also: Complete list of NRC Presidents.

== Organizational structure ==
Divisions of the NRC include:

- Digital Technologies
- Emerging Technologies
  - Canadian Photonics Fabrication Centre
  - Herzberg Astronomy and Astrophysics
  - Metrology
  - Quantum and Nanotechnologies
- Engineering
  - Construction
  - Energy, Mining and Environment
  - Ocean, Coastal and River Engineering
- Life Sciences
  - Aquatic and Crop Resource Development
  - Human Health Therapeutics
  - Medical Devices
- Transportation and Manufacturing
  - Aerospace
  - Automotive and Surface Transportation
  - Design and Fabrication Services
- Industrial Research Assistance Program
- Secretary General
- Corporate Services and Finance

== Research and collaboration centres ==
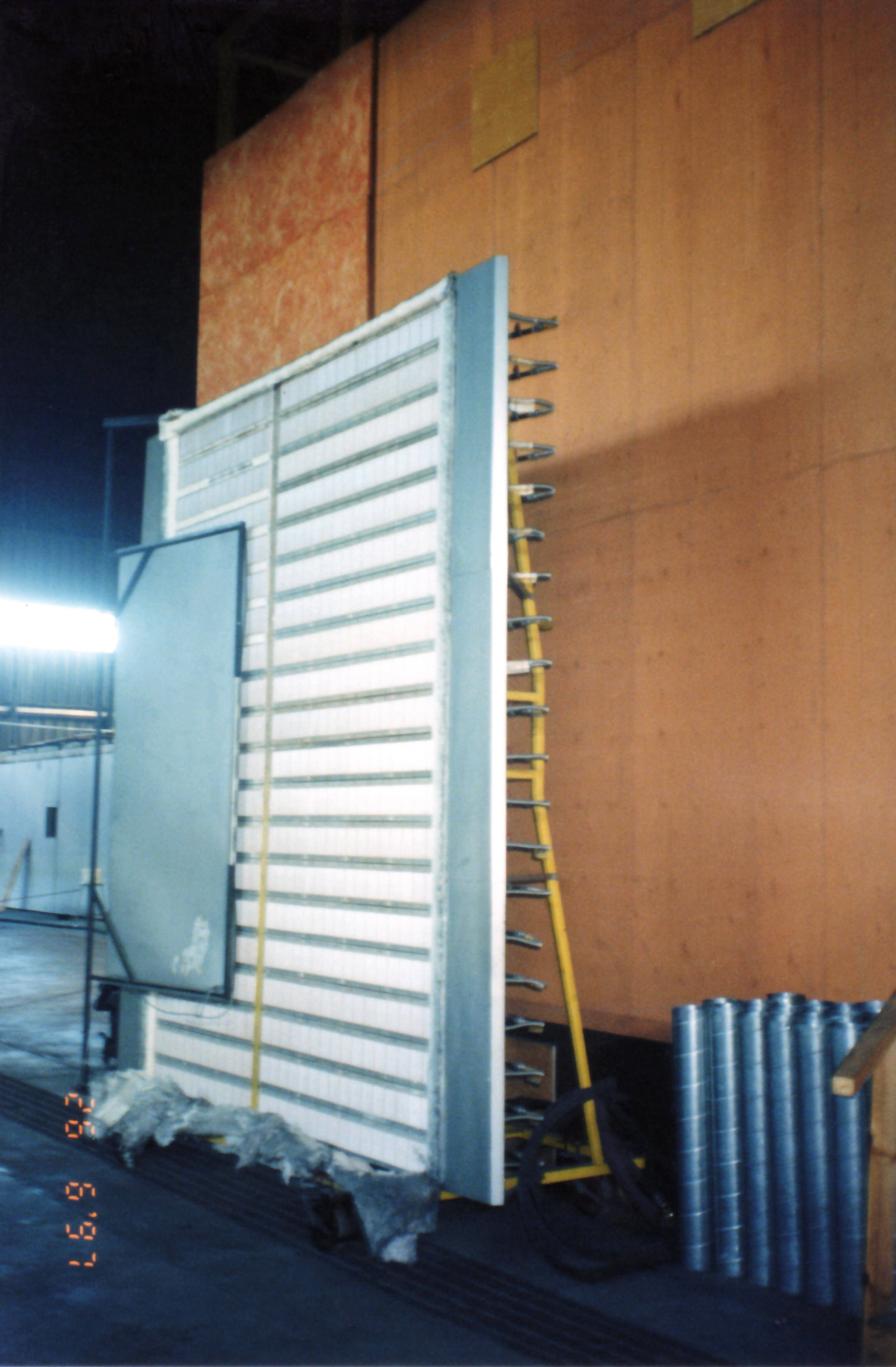
A radiant heat panel for precision testing of quantified energy exposures at the Institute for Research in Construction of the NRC, near Ottawa.

The NRC highlights 12 research centres and 9 collaboration centres on its website:

=== Research centres ===
- Aerospace Research Centre
- Aquatic and Crop Resource Development Research Centre
- Automotive and Surface Transportation Research Centre
- Clean Energy Innovation Research Centre
- Construction Research Centre
- Digital Technologies Research Centre
- Herzberg Astronomy and Astrophysics Research Centre
- Human Health Therapeutics Research Centre
- Medical Devices Research Centre
- Metrology Research Centre
- Ocean, Coastal and River Engineering Research Centre
- Quantum and Nanotechnologies Research Centre

=== Collaboration centres ===
- Centre for Research and Applications in Fluidic Technologies (CRAFT)
- NRC-Canadian Institute for Cybersecurity (CIC) Cybersecurity Collaboration Consortium
- NRC-Centre hospitalier universitaire (CHU) Sainte-Justine Collaborative Unit for Translational Research
- NRC-Fields Mathematical Sciences Collaboration Centre
- NRC-Memorial University Karluk Collaboration Space for Ocean Engineering, Technology, and Science
- NRC-University of British Columbia Collaboration Centre for Clean Energy Transition
- NRC-University of Toronto Collaboration for Green Energy Materials
- NRC-University of Ottawa Joint Centre for Extreme Photonics
- NRC-University of Waterloo Collaboration on Artificial Intelligence, Internet of Things, and Cybersecurity

== Industrial Research Assistance Program (IRAP) ==
The NRC Industrial Research Assistance Program (NRC-IRAP) was introduced in 1947 to support product developments in small to medium-sized businesses. The NRC provides grants and financial support to companies looking to bring new and innovative technologies to the market. More than 250 field staff and 130 offices across Canada provide businesses with access to the program. In In 2012, the program became international by joining Eureka, the largest international collaboration network for industrial R&D.

Some of the many innovations by NRC personnel included the artificial pacemaker, development of canola (rapeseed), one of the first electric wheelchairs for quadriplegics, the Crash Position Indicator, and the Cesium Beam atomic clock. For the 75th-year anniversary in 2022, NRC provided a detailed history of IRAP on its website.

== NRC research and test aircraft ==
The current fleet (2025) according to NRC's website is:

- Bell 412 – 4-DOF airborne simulator (helicopter)
- Bell 205 – 4-DOF simulator (helicopter)
- Bell 206 – Rotary trainer and advanced vision studies (helicopter)
- Cessna 337 - Hybrid Electric Aircraft Testbed (HEAT; twin-engine airplane)
- Convair 580 – Multi-purpose flying laboratory (twin-engine airplane)
- Falcon 20 (Mystère 20) – Aerospace, geoscience testing and micro gravity testing (twin-engine jet)
- Harvard (4) – Trainer and experimental platform for avionics research (single-engine propeller airplane)
- T-33 - Instrumented research aircraft (vintage trainer jet)
- Twin Otter (Series 200) – Atmospheric and biospheric studies, and for flight mechanics and flight systems development (twin-engine turboprop airplane)

Designed and built by NRC

- NRC tailless glider - Two-seat tailless research glider (operated from 1946-1948)

== Nobel Prizes ==
Several Nobel laureates have been associated with the NRC at various points of their careers, including:

- Sir Geoffrey Wilkinson, who spent his time at the NRC in the Montreal and the Chalk River laboratories (1942–1946)
- Dudley R. Herschbach, formerly an NRC visiting student, Nobel Prize in Chemistry
- John Polanyi, formerly an NRC postdoctoral Fellow, Nobel Prize in Chemistry
- Rudolph A. Marcus, formerly an NRC postdoctoral Fellow, Nobel Prize in Chemistry
- Sir Harold Kroto, formerly an NRC postdoctoral Fellow, Nobel Prize in Chemistry
- Bertram Brockhouse, who conducted atomic research at Chalk River from 1950 to 1952, and worked at the NRC laboratories in Ottawa (1944–1947)
- Sir John Pople, Nobel Prize in Chemistry
- Sir John Cockcroft, Nobel Prize in Physics
- Gerhard Herzberg, formerly a Director of the Division of Pure Physics, Nobel Prize in Chemistry
- Donna Strickland, formerly a Research Associate, Nobel Prize in Physics

== Controversies ==
=== Harper government budget cuts and muzzling of scientists ===
Under the tenure of Prime Minister Stephen Harper from 2006 until 2015, Canadian Government research organizations began to restrict the ability of government scientists to communicate with the public.

In 2010, the Minister of State for Science and Technology Gary Goodyear appointed John McDougall, a former president and CEO of the Alberta Research Council petroleum engineer, as President of the NRC. His appointment was followed by several controversies.

In 2011, McDougall began to oversee a change in research focus away from basic research and towards industry-relevant research. This included the development of multiple programs which shifted the research budget out of existing projects and into a number of focused programs.

In 2012, National Research Council environmental scientists "were barred from discussing their work on snowfall with the media."

In 2012, the Harper government introduced the budget implementation bill (C-38) entitled "Jobs, Growth and Long-term Prosperity Act Bill". Environmental groups argued that science was being gutted and silenced to open the way for development in ecologically sensitive areas in the north. In June 2012, the federal opposition made a motion in parliament,

That, in the opinion of the House, Canadian scientific and social science expertise is of great value and, therefore, the House calls on the Government to end its muzzling of scientists; to reverse the cuts to research programs at Environment Canada, Fisheries and Oceans Canada, Library and Archives Canada, National Research Council Canada, Statistics Canada, and the Natural Sciences and Engineering Research Council of Canada; and to cancel the closures of the National Council of Welfare and the First Nations Statistical Institute.

In October 2012, McDougall and his appointee as VP Business Management, Dr. Ian Potter, served termination notices to all of the NRC's Business Development Officers (BDOs) across Canada, which ultimately impacted the majority of the NRC's intellectual property management, patenting, and business development activities conducted at the various NRC's research centres in Canada.

The transformation of the NRC into a research and technology organization focusing on "business-led research" was part of the Harper government's Economic Action Plan 2013. On 7 May 2013, the NRC launched its new "business approach" in which it offered four business lines: strategic research and development, technical services, management of science and technology infrastructure and the NRC-Industrial Research Assistance Program (IRAP). With these services, the NRC intended to shorten the gap between early stage research and development and commercialization.

During McDougall's tenure as president, there was a drop in research publications and new patents from the NRC as the scientific staff was cut significantly. An article published in April 2016 and based on information from the office of the Minister of Science gave the following figures for the period 2011–2015:

In the five years from 2011 through 2015, the number of studies in academic journals were 1,889, 1,650, 1,204, 1,017 and 549, respectively. (Figures from 2010 and earlier are generally in the 1,200 to 1,300 range.) The number of patents over the period 2011 to 2014 (with no figure available for 2015) are: 205, 251, 128 and 112, respectively. The years before 2011 averaged 250 to 300 patents per year.

In September 2016, the office of the Minister of Science released figures showing that from 2010 to 2015, the number of research officers at the NRC fell by 26 per cent, and the number of scientists and engineers of all kinds fell by 22 per cent.

In March 2016, John McDougall sent a three-sentence email to NRC employees, announcing that he was going on personal leave. Subsequently, NRC management announced that two major projects he had led would be abandoned: re-branding the NRC as "CNRCSolutions" – though colourful "CNRCSolutions" T-shirts and "branding books" had already been distributed, and re-organizing its three research divisions into five research divisions. Ian Potter abruptly resigned in 2018 after 16 months of private language training in his home town Edmonton.

=== Mississippi Mills water contamination ===
McDougall's tenure as president included the period during which the NRC contaminated the water table in the Eastern Ontario community of Mississippi Mills, without informing its inhabitants. In January 2014, NRC employees at the fire-safety testing facility in Mississippi Mills were told to start drinking bottled water. In December 2015, 23 months later, residents of Mississippi Mills with homes near the facility were warned by the NRC that their well-water was contaminated with toxic chemicals called perfluorinated alkyl substances, often found in firefighting foam. In July 2016, Acting President Maria Aubrey formally acknowledged that the NRC's National Fire Laboratory was the source of the groundwater contamination in Mississippi Mills. In December 2016, it was reported that owners of homes near the lab in Mississippi Mills were launching a multi-million dollar lawsuit against the NRC over water contamination.

=== China sponsored hacking allegation ===
In 2014 the NRC's computer network was the target of a cyber attack by Chinese infiltrators, which resulted in the NRC's IT network being shut down for an extended period of time.

=== Thirty Meter Telescope ===
Thirty Meter Telescope (TMT) is a USA-lead, proposed extremely large telescope (ELT) that has become controversial due to its planned location on Mauna Kea, which is considered sacred land according to the native Hawaiians, on the island of Hawaii in the United States.

On April 6, 2015, Prime Minister Stephen Harper announced that Canada would commit $243.5 million over a period of 10 years. The telescope's enclosure was designed by Dynamic Structures Ltd. in British Columbia.

The project became subject to blockades and on July 20, 2019, a group of Canadian academics called to divest Canadian funding from the project in an online petition.

As of 2025, Canada did not divest but a new location for the TMT in Las Palmas (Spain) has now been selected.

== Agencies and organizations with special relationships with the NRC ==
Specialized agencies and services which have branched out of the NRC include:

- Atomic Energy of Canada Limited
- Canadian Institutes of Health Research
- Canadian Science Publishing
- Canadian Space Agency
- Communications Security Establishment
- Defence Research and Development Canada
- Natural Sciences and Engineering Research Council

== See also ==
- National Research Council Time Signal
- List of aerospace flight test centres
- Science and technology in Canada
- Herbert Yardley – American cryptologist who help establish the Examination Unit in 1941
- William Arthur Steel – headed radio laboratory at the NRC in the 1930s
