= Joss Reimer =

Canadian physician

Joss Reimer OM

4th Chief Public Health Officer of Canada
- Incumbent
- Assumed office April 1, 2026
- Prime Minister: Mark Carney
- Preceded by: Theresa Tam (Note: Howard Njoo served as interim Chief Public Health Officer of Canada from June 20, 2025 until April 1, 2026)

Personal details
- Education: McMaster University; University of Winnipeg (BA); University of Manitoba (MD, MPH)
- Occupation: Physician

Jocelyn Nicole Reimer OM is a Canadian physician who has served as the Chief Public Health Officer of Canada since 2026. Prior to this appointment, she was the Chief Medical Officer for the Winnipeg Regional Health Authority and president of the Canadian Medical Association.

== Early life and education ==
Reimer was raised in Winkler, Manitoba, Canada. Before undertaking medical studies, she completed a Bachelor of Arts from the University of Winnipeg. She completed her medical education and residency at McMaster University and the University of Manitoba, earning a Doctor of Medicine in 2008 and a Master of Public Health degree in 2013. After two years of postgraduate medical training in obstetrics and gynaecology at McMaster from 2008 to 2010, she transferred to the University of Manitoba in public health and preventive medicine, obtaining fellowship certification in 2013.

== Medical career ==
During the COVID-19 pandemic, Reimer was the medical lead for the vaccination implementation task force in Manitoba. She served in this role for 16 months. While Reimer was in this role, she revealed that she was subjected to threats from people who were upset about COVID-19 restrictions.

On April 22, 2022, Reimer began her role as Chief Medical Officer for the Winnipeg Regional Health Authority.

On May 29, 2024, Reimer was installed as president of the Canadian Medical Association On May 31, 2025, Reimer was succeeded as president by New Brunswick oncologist Margot Burnell.

On February 20, 2026, Minister of Health Marjorie Michel announced that Reimer would become Chief Public Health Officer of Canada on April 1, 2026.

== Honours ==
In 2026, she was appointed to the Order of Manitoba, the province’s highest honour.
