= David Butler-Jones =

Canadian civil servant

1st Chief Public Health Officer of Canada
- In office October 23, 2004 – June 2013
- Prime Minister: Paul Martin; Stephen Harper
- Preceded by: Frank Plummer (interim)
- Succeeded by: Gregory W. Taylor

Personal details
- Occupation: Physician

David Alexander Jones OC, also known as David Butler-Jones, is a Canadian physician and public servant who served as the first chief public health officer of Canada from the position's formation in October 2004 until stepping down in June 2013.

== Biography & career ==
Butler-Jones was born in Toronto. In 1978, he graduated with a doctorate of medicine from the University of Toronto. He completed his residency in family medicine at Queens University, obtaining his Canadian College of Family Medicine certification in 1980. He also obtained a master of health science degree in community health and epidemiology from the University of Toronto.

Having worked as a physician for a time in Newfoundland and Labrador, in March 1983 the Algoma Health Unit appointed him the medical officer of health for the district of Algoma in northern Ontario, including Sault Ste. Marie. In 1985, he helped to lead referendums to add fluoride to municipal drinking water. While voters in the town of Wawa approved the plan, voters in Sault Ste. Marie rejected it for a third time.

In Algoma, he also helped to create a community psychiatric program to provide support for adults with mental illness in their own homes to prevent what he called "the revolving door syndrome" where people coping with chronic mental illness would repeatedly find themselves in hospital.

In September 1986, Butler-Jones became the medical officer of health for Simcoe County.

From 1995 to 2002, Butler-Jones served as the chief medical health officer and executive director of the Population Health and Primary Health Services branches for the province of Saskatchewan.

Previously, he taught at both the undergraduate and graduate levels and was involved as a researcher in public health issues. He was a professor in the Faculty of Medicine at the University of Manitoba as well as a clinical professor with the Department of Community Health and Epidemiology at the University of Saskatchewan's College of Medicine.

=== Public Health Agency of Canada ===
As the chief public health officer, Butler-Jones was both the lead health professional in the government and the deputy minister for the Public Health Agency of Canada. Over the course of his career, he worked in many parts of Canada in both public health and clinical medicine.

The chief public health officer was the head of PHAC until the 2014 omnibus budget bill, in which the government of Stephen Harper decided to reorganize the management structure of PHAC to institute a parallel presidential structure to govern the organization that then could be staffed by non-medical and non-scientific personnel.

After a stroke in 2012, Butler-Jones stepped down as chief public health officer in June 2013 to focus on rehabilitation. He was succeeded by Gregory Taylor.

Following his recovery, Butler-Jones has worked in a variety of roles, speaking, teaching and serving on boards, as well as advising on public health and health system issues, especially as they relate to indigenous health.

=== Professional organizations ===
In professional organizations, he has served as president of the Canadian Public Health Association; vice president of the American Public Health Association; chair of the Canadian Roundtable on Health and Climate Change; international regent on the board of the American College of Preventive Medicine; member of the Governing Council for the Canadian Population Health Initiative; chair of the National Coalition on Enhancing Preventive Practices of Health Professionals; and co-chair of the Canadian Coalition for Public Health in the 21st Century.

== Honours ==
In recognition of his work in the field of public health, York University's Faculty of Health and Carleton University have awarded him an honorary doctor of laws degree.

The University of Waterloo conferred a doctor of science degree on him in 2017.

He is also a recipient of The Canadian Public Health Association's R D Defries Award, its highest honour.

He has also been recognized by the College of Family Physicians and Scotiabank Family Medicine Lectureship and received the Medal of Service from the Canadian Medical Association for "his outstanding and exceptional contribution to health care in Canada" as well as the President's Award of the Public Health Physicians of Canada.

In 2025, he was made an officer of the Order of Canada.
