= National Science Advisor (Canada) =

Official position in Canada

National Science Advisor to the prime minister was a post that existed from 2004 to 2008. Previously, in 2003, the Privy Council Office published A Framework for the Application of Precaution in Science-based Decision Making about Risk under the government of Prime Minister Jean Chrétien. It provided "a lens to assess whether precautionary decision making is in keeping with Canadians' social, environmental and economic values and priorities."

Arthur Carty officially started in the role of on April 1, 2004. The advisor headed the Office of the National Science Advisor (ONSA), within Industry Canada, later moved to Privy Council Office. Carty was previously the president of the National Research Council and when Carty retired on March 31, 2008, the position was eliminated under the government of Stephen Harper.

In the 2015 Minister of Science Mandate Letter there was a priority to create a new Chief Science Officer position and on December 5, 2016 the minister of Science Kirsty Duncan announced the competition for the new position, to be called Chief Science Advisor. On September 26, 2017, Prime Minister Justin Trudeau announced that Mona Nemer would fill that role.

== See also ==
- The Council of Canadian Academies - An independent science advisory body for the Government of Canada
