= Iain Stewart (Canadian official) =

Canadian government official

President of the Public Health Agency of Canada
- In office September 21, 2020 – October 2021
- Prime Minister: Justin Trudeau
- Preceded by: Kristina Namiesniowski
- Succeeded by: Harpreet S. Kochhar

Personal details
- Born: Nova Scotia

Iain Stewart is a Canadian public servant who is best known for his leadership roles in federal science agencies, including as President of the Public Health Agency of Canada (PHAC) during the COVID-19 pandemic. He is particularly noted for his summons to the bar of the House of Commons in 2021, a rare parliamentary procedure.

== Early career ==
Stewart began his career in the Canadian public service in the early 2000s, working across various departments, including Industry Canada, where he gained experience in economic and regulatory policy. Over time, Stewart became known for his leadership, focusing on innovation, science, and technology.

Before his appointment at PHAC, Stewart served as the president of the National Research Council of Canada (NRC), where he oversaw scientific research and development initiatives. His role at NRC involved promoting innovation and responding to emerging national challenges.

== Public Health Agency of Canada (PHAC) ==
In September 2020, Stewart was appointed President of PHAC, succeeding Tina Namiesniowski. This appointment came at a critical time as Canada was grappling with the complexities of managing the COVID-19 pandemic. Stewart’s leadership at PHAC involved overseeing vaccine procurement, distribution strategies, and coordinating public health measures across Canada in cooperation with federal, provincial, and territorial governments.

Despite these efforts, the Auditor General of Canada noted that PHAC was unprepared for the pandemic.

=== Call to the bar of Parliament ===
In June 2021, Stewart was summoned to appear before the House of Commons in a rare parliamentary procedure known as being "called to the bar of Parliament." This marked the first time since 1913 that a public servant had been summoned in this manner. The summons occurred after PHAC, under Stewart’s leadership, defied Parliament and declined to release unredacted documents related to the firing of two scientists from the National Microbiology Laboratory in Winnipeg, citing national security concerns.

Stewart complied with the summons and appeared before the bar on June 21, 2021, where he stood silently and received a formal reprimand from the speaker of the House, Anthony Rota.

== Return to the National Research Council ==
In October 2021, Stewart stepped down from his role as President of PHAC and returned to his previous position as President of the National Research Council of Canada (NRC). His time at PHAC was marked by both praise for his efforts during a challenging period and scrutiny over the decisions related to the disclosure of sensitive information.
