= Arthur Carty =

Canadian academic

Arthur J. Carty
- Born: 12 September 1940 (age 85); Rowlands Gill, Gateshead, England, UK
- Occupations: Academic; government advisor
- Awards: Order of Canada

Arthur J. Carty, OC FRSC (born 12 September 1940), is a Canadian academic and former National Science Advisor to the Government of Canada.

Carty was the inaugural director of the Waterloo Institute for Nanotechnology at the University of Waterloo, special advisor to the President on international science and technology collaboration and research professor in the department of chemistry. From 2004-08, he served as Canada's first national science advisor to the prime minister and to the Government of Canada. Prior to his appointment as national science advisor, he was president of the National Research Council, Canada's leading knowledge and innovation organization, for ten years (1994-2004).

He earned a PhD in inorganic chemistry from the University of Nottingham. Before joining NRC in 1994, he spent two years at Memorial University and 27 years at the University of Waterloo where he was successively professor of chemistry, director of the Guelph-Waterloo Centre for Graduate Work in Chemistry, a pioneering joint graduate program, chair of the chemistry department and dean of research.

Carty maintains an active interest in research in organometallic chemistry and new materials. He has over 300 publications in peer reviewed journals and five patents to his credit. He is a former president of the Canadian Society for Chemistry, an honorary fellow of the Chemical Institute of Canada and of the Fields Institute for Research in the Mathematical Sciences and a fellow of the Royal Society of Canada.

== Affiliations ==
- Atomic Energy Control Board (AECB) and its successor CNSC
- Council of the Canadian Space Agency
- Boards of Genome Canada
- MITACS
- The Stroke Network
- Networks of Centre of Excellence (NCE) and of Environment Canadand National Defense Research
- Founding Chairman of the Board of the Canadian Light Source (CLS; 1999-2008)
- Council of Japan's Science and Technology Forum in Society
- International Advisory Boards of the APEC Centre for Technology Foresight and the Euroscience Open Forum (ESOF)
- Inaugural Canadian co-chair of the Joint S and T Cooperation Committee for the Canada-India science and technology agreement
- Member of the Advisory Board of Bilcare Global Clinical Services based in Pune, India
- Member of the Advisory Board of the Centre for Electron Microscopy at McMaster University
- Chairman of the Board of Innovative Materials Technologies (IMT)
- Member of the Board of Governors of Carleton University.

== See also ==
- List of University of Waterloo people
