= Public Health Agency of Canada =

Government agency

- Agence de la santé publique du Canada

Agency overview
- Formed: 2004
- Preceding agency: Health Canada's Population and Public Health Branch
- Jurisdiction: Government of Canada
- Headquarters: Ottawa, Ontario
- Employees: 4,211 (March 2023)
- Annual budget: Operating: CA$1 576 million; Capital: CA$30 million; Transfer payments: CA$418 million; Statutory: CA$174 million (2024–25)
- Minister responsible: Hon. Marjorie Michel, Minister of Health
- Agency executives: Nancy Hamzawi, President of the Public Health Agency of Canada; Dr. Joss Reimer, Chief Public Health Officer; Vacant, Deputy Chief Public Health Officer
- Parent department: Health Canada
- Child agencies: National Microbiology Laboratory, Centre for Infectious Disease Prevention and Control (CIDPC), Centre for Emergency Preparedness and Response (CEPR), Laboratory for Foodborne Zoonoses (LFZ), Pandemic Preparedness Secretariat (PPS) Health Promotion and Chronic Disease Prevention Branch (HPCDP); Centre for Chronic Disease Prevention and Control (CCDPC), Centre for Health Promotion (CHP), Transfer Payment Services and Accountability Division, Public Health Practice (PHPRO), Office of Public Health Practice (OPHP), Strategic Policy, Communications and Corporate Services Branch (SPCCS)
- Key document: Public Health Agency of Canada Act – S.C. 2006, c. 5
- Website: www.phac-aspc.gc.ca

The Public Health Agency of Canada (PHAC; French: Agence de la santé publique du Canada, ASPC) is an agency of the Government of Canada that is responsible for public health, emergency preparedness and response, and infectious and chronic disease control and prevention.

== History ==
The PHAC was formed because of a series of official inquiries about the severe SARS crisis in Canada. For example, the province of Ontario inquiry and the National Advisory Committee on SARS and Public Health both recommended that a new organisation be formed. It was so instantiated, by Order in Council in 2004 under the Minister of State for Public Health (Canada) of the Martin government and subsequently by legislation that came into force on December 15, 2006, under the Harper government. It is part of the federal government's Health Portfolio (along with Health Canada, the Canadian Institutes of Health Research, and other organizations).

At the time of its creation in 2004, most of the agency's staff were located in the former Gandalf Technologies building in Nepean, south of Ottawa, and were part of Health Canada's Population and Public Health Branch. The first President of the PHAC and Chief Public Health Officer was David Butler-Jones.

In 2009, when the 2009 swine flu pandemic episode occurred, the PHAC had already been chartered for three years. In Canada, roughly 10% of the populace were infected with the virus, with 363 confirmed deaths (as of December 8); confirmed cases had reached 10,000 when Health Canada stopped counting in July. Canada began its vaccination campaign in October and vaccinated a higher proportion of its citizens than any other country. The pandemic was the subject of a review document, issued in November 2010.

The CPHO position was left vacant for 16 months until Dr Gregory W. Taylor was elevated to the post on 24 September 2014. Taylor had filled the position on an interim basis since the departure of David Butler-Jones.

=== Changes towards a bicameral management structure (2014) ===
In the November 2014 omnibus budget bill, the 28th Canadian Ministry of Stephen Harper decided to reorganise the management structure of PHAC. Whereas formerly the deputy civil servant charged with the operation of the PHAC was identical to the CPHO, the omnibus budget bill instituted a parallel Presidential structure to govern the organisation that then could be staffed by non-medical and non-scientific personnel. The NDP health critic said at the time that: "To bury it in an omnibus bill says to me that they don't want people to know about it and they don't want questions," while Health Minister Rona Ambrose said that "the idea for the new structure came from the agency itself."

=== Official languages is a question of public health (2016) ===
On 28 September 2016, the Commissioner of Official Languages (at the time Graham Fraser) told the executive committee of the PHAC that "official languages leadership is also a question of public health" in a speech authorized by President Siddika Mithani.

=== GPHIN "completely disbanded" (2019) ===
In 2015, CPHO Taylor left vacant a Beijing position, which had until 2015 "stationed a Canadian doctor in the Chinese capital as a direct point of connection to Chinese health officials (and an independent observer). In the absence of its own early-warning system, Canada was forced to rely more heavily on the WHO." Adjunct professor at the University of Ottawa and national security critic Wesley Wark laments that vacancy, and said "What we didn't have was the capacity – our own independent capacity – to verify" the state of affairs in China, which was the source of the 2002–2004 SARS outbreak from which was drawn the raison-d'etre of the PHAC. This state of affairs came to light in various media at various times during the 2020 COVID-19 pandemic.

On 24 May 2019, the Global Public Health Intelligence Network (GPHIN) of PHAC was completely disbanded and a "department edict that all such alerts had to be approved by senior managers" of PHAC was issued. On 30 July 2020, the auditor general of Canada took notice of a Globe and Mail report in which whistleblowers had participated and launched an investigation into the scandal. The GPHIN had been part of Canada's contribution to the WHO, which described GPHIN as "a cornerstone" and "the foundation" of global early warning. In fact "approximately 20 per cent of the WHO's epidemiological intelligence" had come from GPHIN before it was silenced.

=== Resignation of senior managers (2020) ===
On September 18, 2020 while Parliament was prorogued, Tina Namiesniowski, who was then the President of the PHAC resigned 17 months into her five-year tenure, which had begun on May 6, 2019. Her resignation followed the resignation of vice-president in charge of the pandemic early warning system and emergency stockpile who had resigned earlier in the week. Iain Stewart was transferred from the National Research Council of Canada to head up the troubled division.

=== Disgrace of Chinese scientists (2019-2021) ===
The PHAC controls and funds the National Microbiology Laboratory BSL4 lab at which Xiangguo Qiu and her husband Keding Cheng performed their research into dangerous infectious diseases like Ebola and the West Nile virus. In July 2019 the Chinese nationals were fired from their non-salaried positions at the University of Winnipeg and "an unknown number of her [UW] students from China were removed from the lab on July 5" after the RCMP was called in May 2019 to investigate the curious affair of a trans-Pacific shipment of BSL4-grade viruses; at the time the PHAC was not identified by the CBC as other than an interested party although her LinkedIn page does list her employer since 2003 as the PHAC. In May 2021, it came to light that the PHAC had employed the pair until their dismissal in January 2021. As of May 2021 the PHAC "has repeatedly declined to divulge to the House of Commons special committee on Canada-China relations" the reason for their dismissal, a situation which puzzles certain Parliamentarians because Parliament through their agent the Cabinet funds the PHAC. In the event of continued rebuff from the President of the PHAC, the Parliamentarians have already voted to send the issue to the House from which they were delegated. The President has legal advice from government solicitors in which he is advised against disclosure, but the Parliamentary Secretary to the Minister of Foreign Affairs named Rob Oliphant broadcast his non-confidence in the legal advice of the government of which he is a member. The Canadian Security Intelligence Service had "urged the removal of the security clearances" of the Chinese pair, the event of which brought the matter to public light in July 2019. Stewart said March 2021 that the January 2021 termination of the scientists was due to a "number of review processes" initiated by the PHAC in 2018, "relating to possible breaches of security protocols".

It later came to light that a soldier from the People's Liberation Army of China named Feihu Yan had worked at the NML, co-authored six scholarly papers with Qiu while s/he was employed by the Chinese Academy of Military Medical Sciences, and furthermore had been paid by the PHAC for parts of this five-year collaboration which began before "early 2016". Qiu has co-authored at least eight publications with Yan. A retired CSIS director observed that Canadian researchers are subject to stringent security checks and that this national security procedure somehow appeared to have been bypassed by the Chinese soldier. Feihu participated in studies of Ebola, Lassa fever and Rift Valley fever. As of June 2021, the CBC had informants inside the NML who had seen "the Chinese military scientist" Feihu "at the NML",

It was revealed in June 2021 that, during the initial RCMP investigation, "several computers had been seized, a lab log book was missing and Qiu's regular trips to China were suspended." The CBC reporter was under the impression that two clearances are required to work at the NML: one under the HPTA and another "secret level clearance", but she does not disclose the name nor the controller of this latter clearance.

The CBC reported in June 2021 that they had seen government documents through the Access to Information Act that revealed Qiu to have been funded by a third-party not PHAC for her Chinese travels, of which there were "at least five trips" during 2017 and 2018. The identity of the funder had been redacted by government.

Qiu appears to have defected, since she has published 32 academic papers since she was escorted from the NML in July 2019, although Qiu was on the payroll of PHAC until January 2021. The CBC had actually asked Wang Wenbin of the Ministry of Foreign Affairs (China) in June 2021 at his weekly press conference "if Qiu and Cheng were involved in espionage on behalf of the Chinese government." Meanwhile, the Trudeau government sent the matter to the NSICOP, which was created in 2017 by Justin Trudeau to review matters relating to national security or intelligence.

A former Crown prosecutor saw parallels to the 20th century Project Sidewinder, a joint RCMP-CSIS effort which found that "the Chinese government and Asian criminal gangs had been working together in drug smuggling, nuclear espionage and other criminal activities that constituted a threat to Canadian security", an inconvenient truth that the Chretien government wanted to silence. Christian Leuprecht, an academic at the Royal Military College says this reveals larger security issues at the NML: "This would also explain why you haven't charged them, because once you charge them, then eventually you have to put people on trial. And when you put people on trial, then you have to disclose the evidence that you have. So the government might quite intentionally trying to keep this sort of relatively below the radar as much as it can," not to mention the fact that there is no facility in Canadian law which allows trial in absentia.

== COVID-19 ==
The PHAC has played a central leadership role in Canada's response to the COVID-19 pandemic.

=== Clinical Pharmacology Task Group ===
In 2020, the PHAC convened the COVID-19 Clinical Pharmacology Task Group. The CPTG was an ad-hoc advisory committee composed of experts in the fields of infectious disease, microbiology, clinical pharmacology and pharmaceutical sciences. The group's work concluded on March 30, 2021, and their statements removed from the government website. Membership of the CPTG included:

- Marina Salvadori, Public Health Agency of Canada (Co-chair)
- Michael Rieder, University of Western Ontario (Co-chair)
- Marie Lordkipanidze, Université de Montréal
- Richard Hall, Dalhousie University
- Micheline Piquette-Miller, University of Toronto
- Abby Collier, University of British Columbia
- Srinivas Murthy, University of British Columbia
- Jonathan Kimmelman, McGill University

The CPTG released several statements regarding COVID-19 treatments, advising against hydroxychloroquine while advocating for dexamethasone in hospitalized patients. Considering remdesivir, the group recommended only administering the drug as a part of a clinical trial.

== Organizational structure ==
The president is a Governor in Council appointment for a term of five years. While in early years of the PHAC the President of the organization was identical to the Chief Public Health Officer, who is required by law to be a scientist, the Harper government innovated to manage the organization via the more malleable civil service, and a split personality developed with the twin agencies of President and CPHO.

The post of President is presently held by Nancy Hamzawi, who was appointed in June 2025 to replace Heather Jeffrey.

The chief public health officer (CPHO) is Canada's lead health professional. The CPHO is also a Governor-in-Council appointment whose role is to provide advice both to the Minister of Health and to the President of the PHAC. Dr. Joss Reimer was named CPHO on February 20, 2026 for a three-year term beginning April 1, 2026.

The Public Health Agency of Canada Act empowers the CPHO to communicate with other levels of government, voluntary organizations, the private sector and Canadians on public health issues. As per the Act, each year, the CPHO is required to submit a report to the Minister of Health on the state of public health in Canada.

The FPT SAC on Public Health Response Plan for Biological Events has been in place since at least October 2017:

outlines how the national response to public health events caused by biological agents will be conducted and coordinated, with a focus on implementation of responses led by senior-level FPT public health decision-makers. The plan was developed by an expert task group and was approved by PHNC in October, 2017. The plan describes roles, responsibilities and authorities of FPT governments for public health and emergency management, a concept of operations outlining four scalable response levels and a governance structure that aims to facilitate an efficient, timely, evidence-informed and consistent approach across jurisdictions.

== Headquarters and leadership ==
The PHAC headquarters are located in two pillars—one is in Ottawa. The other is the National Microbiology Laboratory in Winnipeg, Manitoba, the location of Canada's only Level 4 microbiology lab for human health. Both the President and the CPHO officiate from Ottawa. The President is ranked above the CPHO in the departmental organization chart.

List of presidents of the Public Health Agency of Canada
No.	CPHO	Appointed	Retired	Appointed by
1	David Butler-Jones	October 23, 2004	June 2013	Paul Martin
–	Gregory W. Taylor (interim)	June 2013	October 2014	Stephen Harper
2	Krista Outhwaite	October 24, 2014	April 2016	Stephen Harper
3	Siddika Mithani	April 11, 2016	February 25, 2019	Justin Trudeau
4	Kristina Namiesniowski	May 6, 2019	September 2020	Justin Trudeau
5	Iain Stewart	September 21, 2020	October 2021	Justin Trudeau
6	Harpreet S. Kochhar	2021	February 2023	Justin Trudeau
7	Heather Jeffrey	February 27, 2023	June 2025	Justin Trudeau
8	Nancy Hamzawi	June 20, 2025		Mark Carney

== Responsibilities ==
The PHAC is the locus of control for several systemic healthcare defences, amongst which are included:

- National Emergency Stockpile System
- National Antiviral Stockpile
- Infectious Disease Prevention and Control Branch
- Prion Diseases Program
- Disease Control and Detection
- Health Safety
  - Travel Alerts
  - Immunization and Vaccines
  - Emergency Preparedness
  - Health Promotion
  - Injury Prevention
- Research and Statistics
- Health Education

As well as the above, the PHAC houses the Centre for Emergency Preparedness and Response (CEPR), Canadian Field Epidemiology Program (CFEP) and the Canadian Public Health Service (CPHS).

=== Centre for Emergency Preparedness and Response ===
The CEPR is responsible for possible health risks from:

- natural events and disasters such as floods, earthquakes, fires and highly dangerous infectious diseases; and
- accidents or criminal and terrorist acts involving explosives, chemicals, radioactive substances or biological threats.

=== Creutzfeldt-Jakob Disease Surveillance System ===
The PHAC houses the Creutzfeldt-Jakob Disease Surveillance System (CJDSS) at its Ottawa headquarters.

=== Canada Communicable Disease Report ===
"The Canada Communicable Disease Report (CCDR) is a bilingual, peer-reviewed journal on infectious diseases." It appears "on the first Thursday of each month, with combined issues in March/April and July/August. CCDR publishes surveillance reports, outbreak reports, original research, rapid communications, advisory committee statements and more... The journal has been in continuous publication since 1975," first by Health Canada. Since the 2004 bouleversement it has been published by PHAC. As of May 2020, the duties of Editor-in-Chief were delegated to Michel Deilgat, who resided in the Office of the Chief Science Officer at the Infectious Disease Prevention and Control Branch. The French title of the publication is "Relevé des maladies transmissibles au Canada."

The past Editor-in-Chief who had the office from 2013 to 2019 was named Patricia Huston.

=== Canadian Notifiable Disease Surveillance System ===
The Canadian Notifiable Disease Surveillance System (CNDSS) "collects, validates and maintains basic surveillance data on approximately 60 nationally notifiable diseases, dating back to 1924. Nationally notifiable diseases are infectious diseases that have been identified by the federal government and provinces and territories as priorities for monitoring and control efforts. Provinces and territories voluntarily submit annual notifiable disease data, which are used to produce national disease counts and rates. Age-group and sex breakdown are presented from 1991 onward." "Case definitions for nationally notifiable diseases are intended to support public health activities rather than clinical diagnosis. Standardized case definitions for NND were first developed through a federal/provincial/territorial process in 1991, with subsequent editions in 2000 and 2009. Following the 2009 revision, the decision was taken to make future updates on a case-by-case basis."

=== Canadian Adverse Events Following Immunization Surveillance System (CAEFISS) ===
The Canadian Adverse Events Following Immunization Surveillance System (CAEFISS) is a "federal, provincial and territorial (FPT) public health post-market vaccine safety surveillance system" managed by PHAC. CAEFISS receives passive reports of Adverse Events Following Immunization (AEFI) as well as engages in active monitoring of marketed vaccines in Canada. Pharmacovigilance related to AEFI is a shared responsibility between Health Canada and PHAC.

== Annual reports ==
The PHAC produces numerous reports, amongst which are the annual CPHO reports to the public as well as the annual departmental results summary which is provided for a Parliamentary audience.

=== CPHO reports ===
The CPHO produces yearly public health reports which "summarize evidence on high-priority public health issues and provide a way forward to improve the health of Canadians."

- 10/2025: "Working Together to Thrive: Well-Being and Public Health"
- 10/2024: "Realizing the Future of Vaccination for Public Health"
- 10/2023: "Creating the Conditions for Resilient Communities: A Public Health Approach to Emergencies"
- 10/2022: "Mobilizing Public Health Action on Climate Change in Canada"
- 12/2021: "A Vision to Transform Canada's Public Health System"
- 10/2020: "From risk to resilience – An equity approach to COVID-19"
- 12/2019: "Addressing Stigma – Towards a More Inclusive Health System"
- 06/2019: "Preserving Antibiotics Now and Into the Future"
- 10/2018: "Preventing Problematic Substance Use in Youth Report"
- 03/2018: "Spotlight on Eliminating Tuberculosis in Canada"
- 10/2017: "Designing Healthy Living"
- 12/2016: "Health Status of Canadians 2016: A Report of the Chief Public Health Officer"
- 10/2016: "A Focus on Family Violence in Canada"
- 02/2016: "Alcohol Consumption in Canada"
- 09/2016: "Public Health in the Future"
- 09/2013: "Infectious Disease – The Never-ending Threat"
- 10/2012: "Influencing Health – The Importance of Sex and Gender"
- 11/2011: "Youth and Young Adults - Life in Transition"
- 10/2010: "Growing Older – Adding Life to Years"
- 10/2009: "Growing Up Well – Priorities for a Healthy Future"
- 06/2008: "Growing Up Well – Addressing Health Inequalities"

=== Departmental results ===
The Departmental Results Reports can be found along with Financial Statements.

== See also ==
- List of national public health agencies
- VSV-EBOV
