= Gregory W. Taylor =

Canadian physician and public servant

2nd Chief Public Health Officer of Canada
- In office September 24, 2014 – December 16, 2016
- Prime Minister: Stephen Harper; Justin Trudeau
- Minister: Rona Ambrose; Jane Philpott
- Preceded by: David Butler-Jones
- Succeeded by: Theresa Tam

Personal details
- Occupation: Physician

Gregory W. Taylor is a Canadian physician and public servant who served as the 2nd chief public health officer of Canada from September 24, 2014, until his retirement on December 16, 2016.

== Biography ==
Taylor obtained his qualifications as a medical doctor and family medicine resident at Dalhousie University.

Taylor began his medical career in 1985 at a Guelph practice as a family doctor.

In 1992 he moved to the University of Ottawa in order to complete a fellowship in community medicine, after which he was employed by the federal government and began his career as a civil servant.

Taylor joined Health Canada’s Laboratory Centre for Disease Control in 1995.

As CPHO between 2014 and 2016, Taylor needed to advise Canadians on the Ebola outbreak and the Zika virus. Taylor was very concerned about the development of superbugs, and he advised Canadians to ease up on alcohol.

Taylor is now listed as an adjunct professor of epidemiology at the University of Ottawa.

Taylor has served on the board of directors of the Michael Smith Foundation for Health Research since March 2018.
