= Theresa Tam =

3rd chief public health officer of Canada

Theresa Tam OC FRCPC
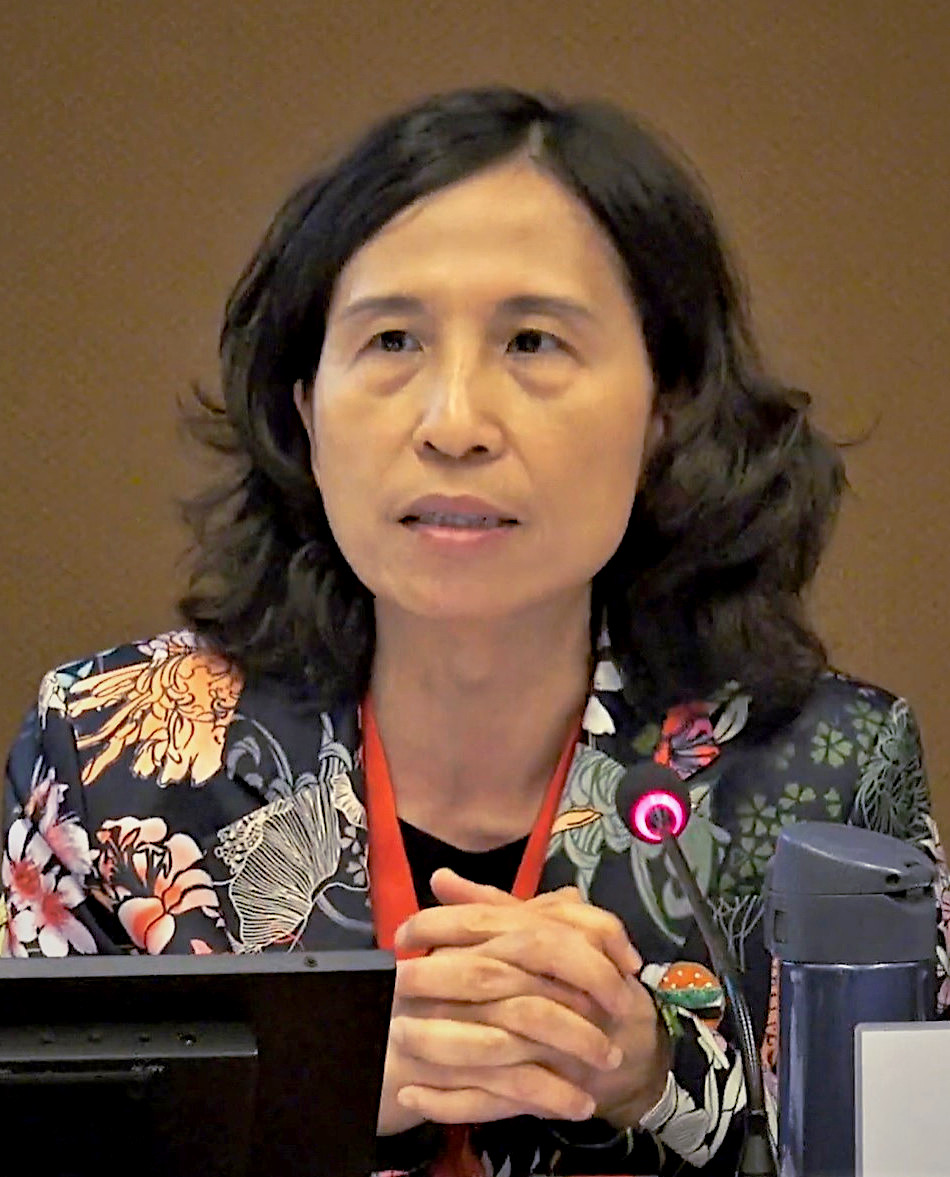
- Tam speaking at a 2019 World Health Assembly event in Geneva

3rd Chief Public Health Officer of Canada
- In office June 26, 2017 – June 20, 2025
- Prime Minister: Justin Trudeau; Mark Carney
- Minister: Jane Philpott; Patty Hajdu; Jean-Yves Duclos; Mark Holland; Kamal Khera; Marjorie Michel
- Preceded by: Gregory W. Taylor
- Succeeded by: Howard Njoo (interim)

Personal details
- Born: 1965 (age 60–61) British Hong Kong
- Education: University of Nottingham (MBBS)
- Occupation: Physician

Chinese name
- Traditional Chinese: 譚詠詩
- Simplified Chinese: 谭咏诗
Transcriptions
Standard Mandarin
- Hanyu Pinyin: Tán Yǒngshī
Yue: Cantonese
- Yale Romanization: Tàahm Wihngsī

Theresa Tam (Chinese: 譚詠詩; born 1965) is a Canadian physician and public servant who served as the chief public health officer of Canada (CPHO), the second-in-command of the Public Health Agency of Canada (PHAC). Tam initially took the role as acting CPHO following the retirement of her predecessor, Gregory Taylor, on December 16, 2016. She was formally appointed on June 26, 2017. She stepped down as CPHO on June 20, 2025.

Tam has played a leadership role in Canada's response to public health emergencies, including SARS, H1N1, MERS, Ebola, and COVID-19. She has also worked towards eradicating polio.

== Early life and education ==
In 1965, Tam was born in British Hong Kong and later grew up in the United Kingdom. She attended medical school at the University of Nottingham, earning an MBBS 1989. In 1996, She completed her pediatric residency at the University of Alberta, and in 1997, a pediatric infectious diseases fellowship at University of British Columbia.

Since 1996, Tam has been a fellow of the Royal College of Physicians and Surgeons of Canada.

== Career ==
Tam, a pediatric infectious disease specialist, was "assistant deputy minister of infectious disease prevention and control" at Public Health Agency of Canada (PHAC). In 2003, Tam was the chief of Health Canada's immunization and respiratory infections division during the SARS outbreak.

Tam was a co-chair of a 2006 federal report on pandemic preparedness in the wake of the SARS outbreak in Canada, which envisioned a respiratory infection pandemic that was described in The Globe and Mail as foreshadowing the COVID-19 pandemic "with eerie accuracy." At that time in 2006, she was Director of the Immunization and Respiratory Infections Division at the PHAC.

Tam said the opioid crisis, which cost over 2,500 lives in Canada in 2016, could be higher than 3,000 in 2017 if the current trend continues. "This far surpasses the number of motor-vehicle fatalities." She said overprescription of opioids contributed to this trend.

Tam is on the Independent Oversight and Advisory Committee of the Health Emergencies Programme of the World Health Organization (WHO), a role she took up between April and June 2018. She is an official advisor to the WHO's International Health Regulations Emergency Committee on 2019-nCoV.

In 2019, Tam criticized people who refuse vaccines, saying "They're a small number, but they're spreading misinformation." "And they're communicating their opinions in a very emotional way."

=== COVID-19 pandemic ===
On January 7, 2020, when it appeared that there was a health crisis emerging in Wuhan, Tam advised Canadians: "There has been no evidence to date that this illness, whatever it's caused by, is spread easily from person to person; no health care workers caring for the patients have become ill; a positive sign." On January 23, Tam was a member of the WHO committee that broadcast that it was too early to declare a public health emergency of international concern.

As the pandemic progressed and as was typical at the time, as the Chief Public Health Officer of Canada, she made numerous statements that garnered attention, both positive and negative, from the public and from some politicians. Some statements proved to be minimising of the effects of COVID-19, and some were closer to the mark.

Tam initially recommended the general public against wearing masks for two reasons: (i) to protect healthcare workers and prioritize supply; and (ii) "potential negative aspects" of wearing masks, stating "it can sometimes make it worse if the person puts their finger in their eye or touches their face under their mask" and that it can give a false sense of security. On April 6, Tam changed her recommendation to "wearing a non-medical mask, even if you have no symptoms, as an additional measure that you can take to protect others around you in situations where physical distancing is difficult to maintain" because of new data about pre-symptomatic and asymptomatic transmission.

On April 23, Tam was appointed by Justin Trudeau to a new advisory body, the COVID-19 Immunity Task Force, whose mandate he declared to be the coordination of serological surveys across the country.

In February 2021, an Auditor General's report stated that the Public Health Agency of Canada underestimated the threat posed by COVID-19 to Canadians. In particular, it was noted that the Agency "did not consider forward-looking pandemic risk" when it concluded that COVID‐19 would have a minimal impact if an outbreak were to occur in Canada.

== Honours ==
On June 17, 2025, Tam was made an Officer of the Order of Canada. In June 2025, Tam was awarded the King Charles III Coronation Medal.
