= Feed ban =

Method of preventing BSE from spreading

The term Feed ban is usually a reference to the regulations that have prohibited the feeding of most mammalian-derived proteins to cattle as a method of preventing the spread of bovine spongiform encephalopathy (BSE). Feeding of infected ruminant material back to ruminants is believed to be the most likely means of transmission of the disease.

== USA ==
Since the 1997 publication of regulations by the Food and Drug Administration (FDA), a feed ban has been in place.

Exceptions to the FDA ban have existed for mammalian blood and blood products; gelatin; inspected, cooked meat products for humans; milk products; and products containing pork and equine (and avian) proteins.

In July 2003, Will Hueston, who was then the director of the University of Minnesota Center for Animal Health and Food Safety in St. Paul, was very concerned about the lack of an FDA feed ban on cattle for Specified Risk Materials.

On January 26, 2004, FDA officials said they would expand the feed ban by prohibiting from ruminant feeds, ruminant blood and blood products, poultry litter, and restaurant plate waste. At issue is whether recommendations by some scientific experts to ban additional products from feed are necessary, as some foreign countries do where BSE is much more widespread. Meanwhile, the USDA "ban on SRMs in the food supply as an interim rule in January 2004, about three weeks after the first U.S." homegrown BSE case was discovered.

In July 2007, the use of high-pressure cattle-stunning devices that could drive SRM tissue into meat was banned by the USDA. Several "BSE-related interim rules, including the ban on SRM from human food," were made permanent at this time.

== Canada ==
In 1992, Canada implemented a national bovine spongiform encephalopathy (BSE) surveillance program. In a 2011 publication, the Canadian Food Inspection Agency (CFIA) was at pains to stress that the "level and design of BSE testing in Canada has always been, and continues to be, in full accordance with the guidelines recommended by the World Organisation for Animal Health (OIE)."

In July 2003, a Specified Risk Material feed ban was imposed by the CFIA. This was the first regulatory change to bovine farm practice in Canada after the British BSE disaster. At the time, the CFIA exceeded the caution of the FDA.

On 12 July 2007, an "Enhanced Feed Ban" (EFB) was imposed by the CFIA's "Feed Ban Task Force", which was chaired by Freeman Libby. By that date, a total of 10 BSE cases had been discovered, the last one in May 2007 which prompted the EFB rule. The EFB was designed in order to maintain Canada's status as an OIE "controlled risk country". Under the EFB, a CFIA permit is required to transport or receive SRM in any form, and "livestock producers must no longer use any feed products containing SRM." The EFB banned "the use of cattle brains, spinal cords, and certain other body parts from all animal feeds, pet foods, and fertilizer." At the time, the SRMs included the "skull, brain, eyes, tonsils, spinal cord, and certain nerve bundles (trigeminal root ganglia and dorsal root ganglia) in cattle 30 months or older, plus the distal ileum (part of the small intestine) of all cattle." According to a CanWest News report, "SRM must now be removed with special equipment, hauled away in dedicated trucks, processed, and then buried in landfills, burned in high-temperature incinerators, or dumped into composters and bioenergy plants."

At the time, the CFIA was firmly convinced that: with the EFB, "BSE is expected to be eliminated from Canadian cattle in about 10 years; without the new rules, eradication was expected to take several decades."

== See also ==
- Bovine spongiform encephalopathy
- Specified risk material
- Animal feed
