= Human Pathogens and Toxins Act =

Act of the Parliament of Canada

Parliament of Canada
- Long title: An Act to promote safety and security with respect to human pathogens and toxins
- Citation: S.C. 2009, c. 24
- Considered by: House of Commons of Canada
- Considered by: Senate of Canada
- Royal assent: June 23, 2009

Legislative history

First chamber: House of Commons of Canada
- Bill citation: Bill C-11
- Introduced by: Leona Aglukkaq MP, Minister of Health
- First reading: February 9, 2009
- Second reading: February 23, 2009
- Third reading: May 5, 2009

Second chamber: Senate of Canada
- First reading: May 6, 2009
- Second reading: June 2, 2009
- Third reading: June 23, 2009
- Status: Current legislation

The Human Pathogens and Toxins Act (French: Loi sur les agents pathogènes humains et les toxines, HPTA) is an Act of the Parliament of Canada, agreed in 2009 under the Harper government. The responsible Minister is the Minister of Health, and the text defines punishment under the Criminal Code of Canada. The control of security clearances is the exclusive domain of the Minister of Health; neither the RCMP nor the CSIS are mentioned anywhere in the Act. Section 7 of the Act does mention the Transportation of Dangerous Goods Act and the Export and Import Permits Act as falling outside the scope of the HPTA.

== History ==
It came to light in June 2021 during the disgrace of Xiangguo Qiu that the Public Health Agency of Canada requires "anyone working with human pathogens and toxins" at the National Microbiology Laboratory (or elsewhere) to "have clearance under the HPTA." The CBC reporter was under the impression that another "secret level clearance" is required to work at the NML but does not disclose the name nor the controller of this additional clearance.
