= John R. McDougall =

Canadian petroleum engineer (born 1945)

- Born: 1945 (age 80–81); Edmonton, Alberta, Canada
- Education: BS in Civil Engineering University of Alberta
- Occupation: Petroleum engineer
- Employer: President of National Research Council (Canada) (retired 2016)
- Known for: Re-focusing NRC
- Spouse: Irene
- Children: 4

John R. McDougall (also John McDougall) was appointed as the President of the National Research Council (Canada) in April 2010. He was president and chief executive officer of the Alberta Research Council (ARC) for 12 years. He worked for ten years as a petroleum engineer. He was a "member of the NRC-Industrial Research Assistance Program (NRC-IRAP) Advisory Board from 2002 to 2006 and also contributed to the AUTO21 Network of Centres of Excellence, the Edmonton Space & Science Foundation and the Environmental Protection Advisory Committee." He contributed to the Natural Sciences and Engineering Research Council of Canada (NSERC), a Canadian government agency that funds, promotes and assists research in the natural sciences and in engineering.

From 1991 to 1997, he served as the university's first Poole Chair in Management for Engineers, a leadership position within the Faculty of Engineering.

Early in John McDougall's tenure at NRC, in June 2012, there was a controversy concerning Tim Hortons gift cards sent to employees who had just been laid off. On July 29, 2014, Canada's chief information officer announced that the NRC's computer system had been hacked by a "Chinese state-sponsored actor" earlier in the summer.

As described in more detail in a subsequent section, John R. McDougall's tenure as a whole was characterized by a steep drop in publications and patents, by significant cuts in scientific staff and by a 23-month period during which NRC management was aware that NRC was contaminating the water table in a small Ontario community but did not inform that community's inhabitants. The water contamination episode caused owners of nearby homes to launch a multimillion-dollar lawsuit against NRC.

In March 2016, John R. McDougall sent a three-sentence email to NRC employees, announcing that he was going on personal leave. The reasons for John R. McDougall's "retirement" from the presidency of the NRC were never given.

== Early years ==
McDougall, who was born and raised in Edmonton, Alberta, is the great-grandson of the Edmonton pioneer John Alexander McDougall, a former mayor of Edmonton who founded McDougall & Secord in 1879. (Note: According to John R. McDougall, his great-grandfather "put the first automatic dial telephone system in North America in place, he got the streetcars running.") After graduating from the University of Alberta with a Bachelor of Science Degree in Civil Engineering, he worked for nine years in the 1960s and early 1970s as a chemical engineer with Esso, Imperial Oil.

== McDougall & Secord ==
In the 1970s McDougall joined the family business where his father was president. McDougall & Secord specializes in real estate, development, and investment. McDougall was still working for the family business in 2003. McDougall is the titular head of McDougall and Secord. (Note: Irene McDougall operates McDougall & Secord. Fifteen family members are shareholders.)

== Dalcor Innoventures Ltd. ==
He established his own consulting company Dalcor Innoventures Ltd. in 1975 which specialized in large projects ($100 million) in Alberta and around the world undertaking "research, proposals, regulatory approvals, public and stakeholder relations, management, and construction" in "offshore oil, transportation, ports, pipelines, synthetic materials, and coal."

== Poole Chair for Engineers at the University of Alberta ==
While continuing to manage Dalcor, McDougall was Poole Chair from 1991 to 1997.

== Alberta Research Council ==
In 1997 McDougall became president and CEO of the Alberta Research Council (ARC) and remained there for 12 years. ARC was first established in 1921 as a wholly owned subsidiary of the Alberta Science and Research Authority (ASRA). By 2005,

McDougall has engineered a major paradigm shift for the organization. He turned the 80-plus year-old Council from a government-funded, government-centric agency into a nationally recognized, market-driven, innovation juggernaut, serving 900 local and international industry clients a year and garnering more than $80 million in annual revenue.

— Collins 2005

ARC with an $80 million in 2003, focused on developing and commercializing technology including "tire recycling, chemical technologies, fuel-cell technology, aviation safety standards, heavy oil extraction technology, pest management, pulp and paper manufacturing, nutraceutical and pharmaceutical chemistry."

[Canadians]We do a great job of generating fundamental knowledge with a lot of basic research and we’re very sophisticated users of technologically intensive products and services, but historically we’ve done a very poor job of converting ideas into marketable products and services.

— McDougall 2003

In 2003 the ARC McDougall argued that by 2013 parts of the technology to make clean energy would be available. He believed there would be technological changes in place for the whole system by 2023-2028.

We’re very interested in clean energy. The system we’re working on really relates on how to integrate our various energy activities, systems and resources together in ways that are quite unique and have huge synergies by playing one off against another. Given the fact that we have a third of the oil in the world in the oilsands and more energy in the form of coal, we can find ways to put the two together in an environmentally benign form and we’ve got something that is incredibly powerful in decades to come.

— McDougall 2003

By 2003 ARC had initiated "integrated resource management" to take into account "the interaction between the different uses of air, water and land resources."

In 2005 McDougall was also "McDougall is chairman of CFER Technologies, a director of PFB Corporation, a member of the management board of the Alberta Science and Research Authority, director of the Canadian Academy of Engineers, director of St. John Ambulance, past-president of the Canadian Council of Engineers and past-president of the Edmonton Chamber of Commerce."

ARC was one of the developers of a technology that "transforms manure into green electricity, heat, organic fertilizers, and reusable water, while reducing greenhouse gas emissions and other environmental impacts." ARC "validated a new steam assisted gravity drainage (SAGD) process and undertook collaborative research and technology improvements in Canada's wood products industry.

== I-CAN ==
McDougall founded Innoventures Canada, a not-for-profit organization incorporated in 2006 that focuses on commercializing research. and served as its President and CEO before his appointment to the NRC. In his role as President of Innoventures, McDougall used a market-based competitive business model and focused on results-orientated research that reduced business risk.

== Pine beetle research ==
ARC is a member of I-CAN, a not-for-profit organization incorporated in 2006that focuses on commercializing research. In his role as President of Innoventures, McDougall used a market-based competitive business model and focused on results-orientated research that reduced business risk. Major projects included a project on utilization of pine beetle damaged wood. I-CAN and the Alberta Research Council (ARC) are part of a $28-million research project with the Government of Alberta contributing $11 million and the Alberta Newsprint Company contributing $17 million, initiated in 2008 that transforms beetle-killed wood into newsprint.

=== Carbon Algae Recycling System (CARS) ===
In 2008 researchers from five I-CAN organizations were developing a Carbon Algae Recycling System (CARS) to "feed waste heat and flue gas containing CO2 from industrial exhaust stacks to micro-algae growing in artificial ponds."

== NRC ==
From 2002 to 2006 McDougall was on NRC-Industrial Research Assistance Program (NRC-IRAP) Advisory Board.

=== Change in research direction ===
In 2011, NRC President John R. McDougall, began to oversee a change in research focus away from basic research and towards industrial-relevant research. This included the development of several "flagship programs", shifting research budget out of existing research and into a few focused programs. One flagship program, "Algal Carbon Conversion", is related to prior interests of Mr. McDougall, as he previously headed Innoventures, a company involved in lobbying for the development of an algae system to recycle carbon emissions. The Algal Carbon Conversion Pilot Project, with plans for a $19 million facility to be constructed in Alberta, is a partnership between the NRC and industry partners, Canadian Natural Resources Limited (Canadian Natural) and Pond Biofuels. The NRC was not involved in this area of research prior to the arrival of Mr. McDougall.

In a press conference held in Ottawa, 7 May 2013, with Gary Goodyear, Minister of State (Science and Technology) and Deputy Leader of the Government at the Senate, Claude Carignan, John R. McDougall announced the transition of the NRC to an industry-driven, program-based research and technology organization.

=== Tim Hortons gift card controversy ===
A minor controversy early in John R. McDougall's presidency attracted media attention. In June 2012, 65 NRC employees who had just been laid off received $3 gift cards to be spent at the Tim Hortons chain of coffee shops. The cards were accompanied by a letter from Mr. McDougall reading in part: "Thank you for the contribution you have made in helping NRC successfully work through our massive transformation. To celebrate our success in gaining government support, here is a token of appreciation: have a coffee and a doughnut on me." Although the gift cards and letters were sent to all NRC employees, some of those who had just been laid off reacted negatively. One employee described the gift card as "a kick in the teeth". 47 of the employees who were laid off worked at the NRC's Winnipeg location, many of them scientists carrying out research in magnetic resonance imaging.

=== Cyberintrusion ===
Following the announcement on July 29, 2014, that the NRC had been the victim of a major cyberintrusion, the NRC embarked on an overhaul of its IT infrastructure with an original estimated cost of $32.5 million. The actual cost turned out to be much higher, on the order of hundreds of millions of dollars.

=== John R. McDougall's impact on research ===
There was a steep drop in research publications and new patents from NRC during John R. McDougall's stint as president; scientific staff was cut significantly. An article published in April 2016 and based on information from the office of the Science Minister gave the following figures for the period 2011-2015: "In the five years from 2011 through 2015, the number of studies in academic journals were 1,889, 1,650, 1,204, 1,017 and 549, respectively. (Figures from 2010 and earlier are generally in the 1,200 to 1,300 range.) The number of patents over the period 2011 to 2014 (with no figure available for 2015) are: 205, 251, 128 and 112, respectively. The years before 2011 averaged 250 to 300 patents per year". Thus, the decline in the number of academic journal papers by NRC authors over the period 2011-2015 was 71%, and the decline in the number of new patents with NRC inventors over the period 2011-2014 was 45%. In September 2016, the office of the Science Minister released figures showing that from 2010 to 2015, the number of research officers at NRC fell by 26 percent, and the number of scientists and engineers of all kinds fell by 22 percent. "The job losses generally parallel the presidency of John McDougall".

=== Water contamination ===
During John R. McDougall's stint as NRC President, there was a period during which NRC management was aware that NRC was contaminating the water table in a small Ontario community but did not inform that community's inhabitants. In January 2014, NRC employees at the fire-safety testing facility in Mississippi Mills were told to start drinking bottled water. 23 months later (December 2015), residents of Mississippi Mills with homes near the facility were warned by NRC that their well-water was contaminated with toxic chemicals called perfluorinated alkyl substances, often found in firefighting foam.

=== Departure from NRC and aftermath ===
In March 2016, John McDougall sent a three-sentence email to NRC employees, announcing that he was going on personal leave. Subsequently, NRC management announced that two major projects he had led would be abandoned: re-branding the NRC as "CNRCSolutions" – though colourful "CNRCSolutions" T-shirts and "branding books" had already been distributed – and re-organizing its three research divisions into five research divisions. In July 2016, Acting President Maria Aubrey formally acknowledged that the NRC's National Fire Laboratory was the source of the groundwater contamination in Mississippi Mills. Effective August 24, 2016, Iain Stewart became the new President of the NRC. The reasons for John R. McDougall's "retirement" from the presidency of the NRC were never given.

On July 29, 2016, Kennedy Stewart, the NDP science critic in Parliament, was quoted as welcoming the appointment of a new president. He commented: "The new president has his work cut out for him though because the Conservatives ravaged the National Research Council".

In December 2016, it was reported that owners of homes near the lab in Mississippi Mills were launching a multimillion-dollar lawsuit against NRC over water contamination.

== See also ==
- National Research Council (Canada)

== Sources ==
- Alexander, Jane (24 November 2011), Research Council grants help Uxbridge businesses develop new technologies, The Uxbridge Cosmos
- Collins, Andrea (Fall 2005), Bridging Science and the Marketplace, archived from the original on 12 January 2014
- "House of Commons Debates, 41st Parl, 1st Sess, No 134, 5 June 2012 at 8815", Enviro-Hansard, 5 June 2012, archived from the original on 12 January 2014
- "John R. McDougall: Ex-officio Advisor for Genome Canada", Genome Canada, 2014, archived from the original on 12 January 2014
- Hoag, Hannah (21 April 2011), "Canadian research shift makes waves", Nature, 472 (7343): 269, Bibcode:2011Natur.472..269H, doi:10.1038/472269a, PMID 21512543
- "Working Together: Innoventures Canada WORKING Annual Report 2008" (PDF), I-CAN, 2008, archived from the original (PDF) on 12 January 2014
- "Science in retreat:Canada has been scientifically healthy. Not so its government", Nature, Editorial, 452 (7181): 866, 21 February 2008, doi:10.1038/451866a, PMID 18288143
- I-CAN Visibly Strong at Re$earch Money Conference, Ottawa, Ontario: 10th Annual Re$earch Money Conference, 11–12 May 2011, archived from the original on 22 April 2012
- Konotopetz, Gyle (2003), ARC chief revving up innovation engine: Values, standards and ethics important to uphold, vol. 3, Business Edge Magazine
- Government of Canada investing in technology to reduce GHG emissions in the oil sands: Innovative new technology will convert industrial GHG emissions into commercial products, Calgary, Alberta, 10 May 2013, archived from the original on 20 December 2013
- "Open for business: Refocused NRC will benefit Canadian industries: The Government of Canada launches refocused National Research Council". NRC (Press release). Ottawa, Ontario: National Research Council. 7 May 2013. Archived from the original on 11 January 2014.
- "Open for business: Refocused NRC will benefit Canadian industries (audio)". NRC (Press release). 7 May 2013a. Archived from the original on 2015-09-23.
- Government of Canada investing in technology to reduce GHG emissions in the oil sands: Innovative new technology will convert industrial GHG emissions into commercial products, Calgary, Alberta, 10 May 2013, archived from the original on 20 December 2013
- "About NRC Industrial Research Assistance Program", NRC, archived from the original on 15 April 2012
- Light Up Tomorrow's Office, Ottawa, Ontario, 7 December 2009
- Schneider, Doug (March 2000), A Day at the NRC With Paul Barton of PSB Speakers, SoundStage!, archived from the original on 3 November 2012
- "Another Harper Government Science Appointee Run Amok", Sixth Estate, 14 April 2011
