= Chief Science Advisor (Canada) =

Canadian government post

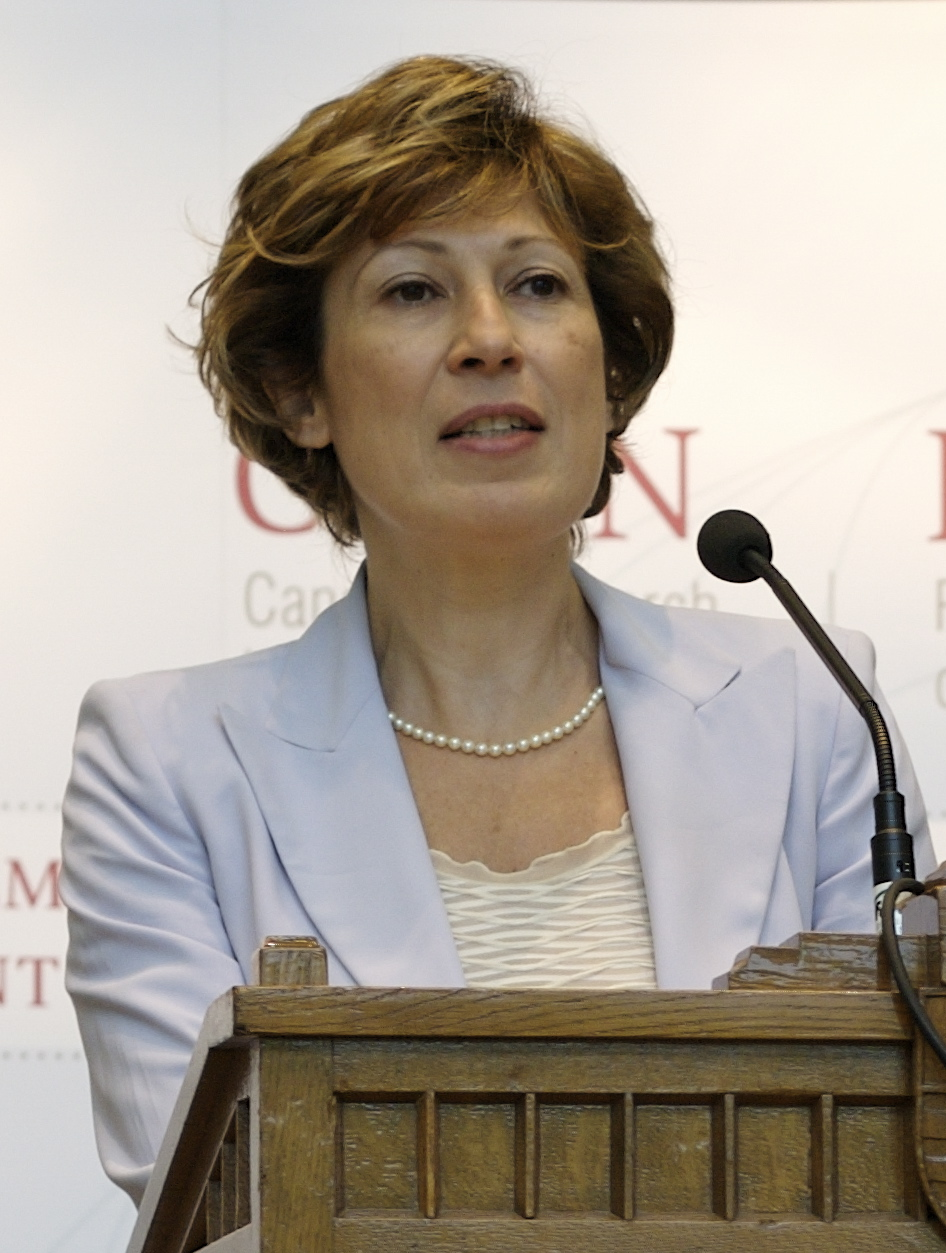
Mona Nemer, Canada's chief science advisor

The Government of Canada's chief science advisor is a post in the Canadian government that was created in 2017 by the Justin Trudeau government. The current advisor is Mona Nemer, who is a specialist in the genetics of heart disease and was vice-president of research at the University of Ottawa for 11 years. Dr. Nemer served an initial three-year term from September 2017 to September 2020, and has been reappointed three times. Her fourth appointment is scheduled to end in September 2027.

The chief science advisor is distinct from the discontinued national science advisor, which was abolished under the Stephen Harper government in 2008.

The main functions of the advisor are to develop guidelines, advise the government on science and improve processes within the government related to scientific research.

== Key functions ==
In its September 26, 2017 announcement, the Government of Canada defined the following key functions for the chief science advisor:

- provide advice on the development and implementation of guidelines to ensure that government science is fully available to the public and that federal scientists are able to speak freely about their work;
- provide advice on creating and implementing processes to ensure that scientific analyses are considered when the Government makes decisions;
- assess and recommend ways to improve the existing science advisory function within the federal government; and
- assess and recommend ways for the Government to better support quality scientific research within the federal system.

The advisor provides an annual report to the prime minister and the minister of science on the state of federal government science which is made public.

== Office and reporting ==
The Office of the Chief Science Advisor is housed at Innovation, Science and Economic Development and supported by a secretariat.

The CSA reports to both the prime minister and the minister of innovation, science and industry.

=== Annual reports ===
Every year the CSA publishes an annual report and makes it available on the internet.

- Chief Science Advisor Annual Report 2024-25
- Chief Science Advisor Annual Report 2023-24
- Chief Science Advisor Annual Report 2022-23
- Chief Science Advisor Annual Report 2021-22
- Chief Science Advisor Annual Report 2020-21
- Chief Science Advisor Annual Report 2019-20
- Chief Science Advisor Annual Report 2018-19

== See also ==
- The Council of Canadian Academies, an independent science advisory body for the Government of Canada
- Government Chief Scientific Adviser in the United Kingdom
- Science advice
