= Mona Nemer =

Lebanese-Canadian scientist

Mona Nemer CM CQ FRSC
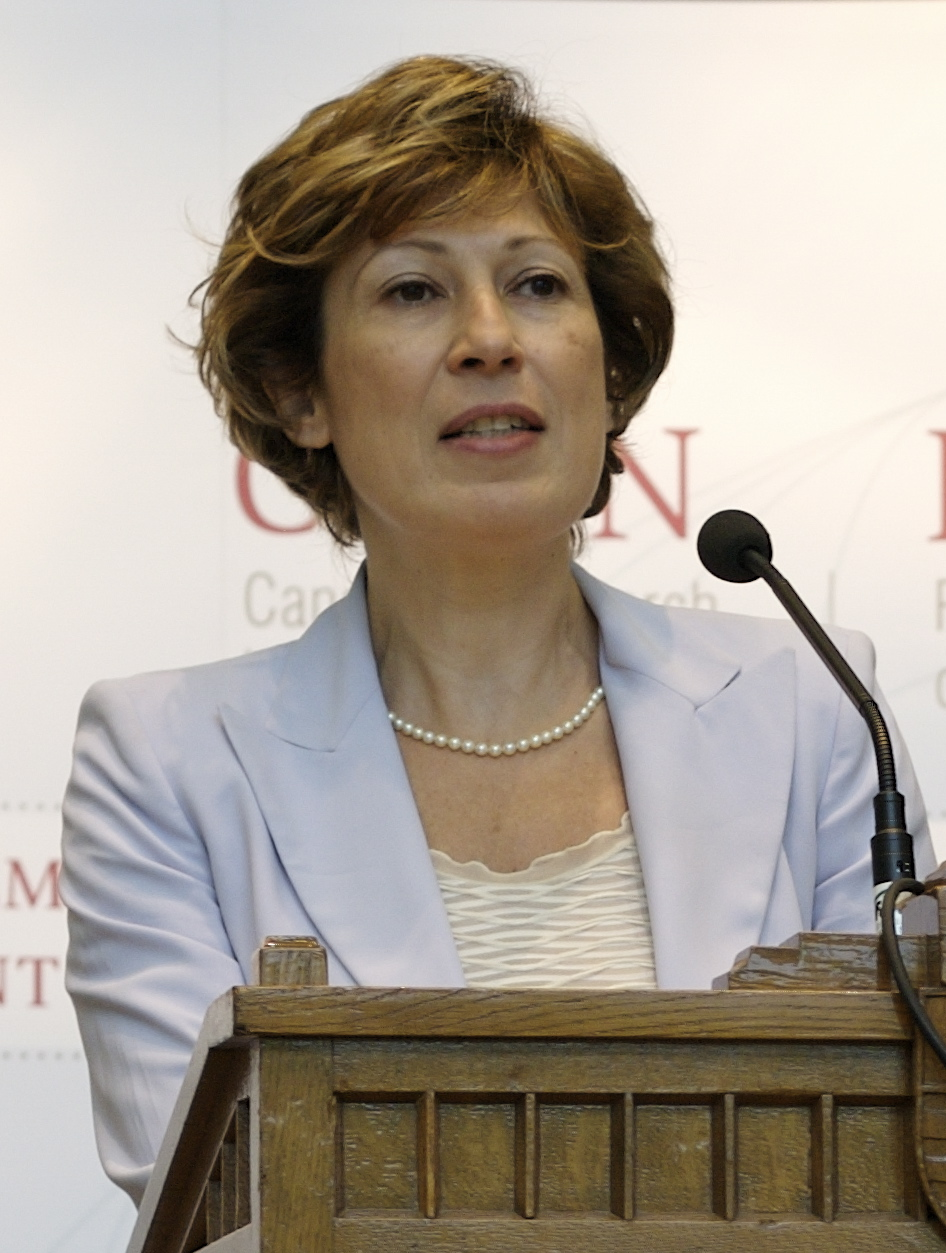
- Nemer at UBC in 2008
- Born: 1957 (age 68–69); Beirut, Lebanon
- Occupation: Professor
- Title: Chief Science Advisor of Canada (2017 – present)

Academic background
- Education: McGill University (PhD); Wichita State University(BSc)

Academic work
- Institutions: University of Ottawa; Université de Montréal
- Website: https://www.uottawa.ca/about/governance/senior-administration/mona-nemer

Mona Nemer, CM CQ FRSC (born 1957) is a Lebanese-Canadian scientist specializing in molecular genetics and cardiac regeneration. She was formerly a professor of pharmacology at the University of Montreal and the Director of the Cardiac Development Research Unit at the Institut de recherches cliniques de Montréal (IRCM) where she held a Tier 1 Canada Research Chair in Cardiovascular Cell Differentiation. She is a professor of biochemistry at the University of Ottawa's Faculty of Medicine, and also served as vice-president, Research at the University of Ottawa from 2006 to 2017.

On September 26, 2017, Prime Minister Justin Trudeau announced that after a selection process, Nemer was chosen as Canada's new Chief Science Advisor – the first national science advisor since 2008.

== Early life ==
Nemer was born in Beirut, Lebanon, in 1957 where she found her passion for chemistry. At the age of 17, she and her classmates successfully advocated to create a science stream at her all-girls school.

She left Lebanon during the civil war and moved to Kansas where she obtained a bachelor's degree in 1977, majoring in chemistry with minors in French and mathematics at Wichita State University. In the summer of 1977, Nemer visited Montreal with friends. The visit convinced her to attend graduate school in the city. She went on to complete a PhD in bio-organic chemistry from McGill University in 1982 under the supervision of Kelvin Ogilvie.

== Career ==
Nemer's research focused on cardiac formation and function – specifically the understanding of the molecular mechanisms that register the genetic expression of cardiac cells. She is best known for isolating genes that regulate ventricular hypertrophy which manifests itself in an increase volume of the heart and a thickening of the myocardial wall. Her work has contributed to the development of diagnostic tests for heart failure and the genetics of cardiac birth defects. Nemer has published over 150 scientific research articles to date, with over 10,000 citations and an h-index of 63. She has also trained over 100 students from Canada and other countries.

=== VP Research, University of Ottawa ===
Nemer served as Vice-President, Research, at the University of Ottawa from 2006 to 2017, and also served as the Director of the Cardiac Development Research Unit at the Institut de recherches cliniques de Montréal (IRCM).

Nemer founded the University of Ottawa's annual greeting card design competition.

=== Chief Science Advisor of Canada ===
On Tuesday, Sept. 26, 2017, following a selection process, Nemer was appointed as Canada's new Chief Science Advisor for a three-year appointment. This role was previously eliminated in 2008 by the previous government, led by Prime Minister Stephen Harper. As Chief Science Advisor, Nemer is responsible for providing impartial scientific advice to the Prime Minister (Justin Trudeau) and the Minister of Innovation, Science and Industry (François-Philippe Champagne) and Cabinet. She is also responsible for providing guidelines for to ensure that government science is publicly accessible, that scientists can speak freely about their work as well as for promoting Canadian science both nationally and internationally. In addition, Nemer reports annually on the activities of her office and the state of federal government science in Canada.

Following 100 days as the Chief Science Advisor, Nemer released a letter outlining her office's plans for 2018, which included developing scientific integrity policies and guidelines, recommending guidelines to ensure government scientists can speak freely about their research and preparing a framework to allow for open public access to federal government science.

On July 30, 2018, Nemer's office published the Model Policy on Scientific Integrity in order to safeguard through collective agreements government scientists' right to speak. This was developed in partnership with the Professional Institute of the Public Service of Canada (PIPSC), officials at the Treasury Board of Canada Secretariat and the federal research community. Her office has also established an Independent Expert Panel on Aquaculture Science, chaired by Nemer, to provide appropriate scientific evidence in policy decisions related to aquaculture and impacts on the marine environment.

==== Open Science ====
As part of her mandate to provide guidelines to ensure that government science is fully available to the public, the Chief Science Advisor and her office worked with international and domestic colleagues to develop the Roadmap for Open Science announced by Navdeep Bains, Minister of Innovation, Science and Industry, on February 26, 2020.

==== COVID-19 ====
In February 2020, when the COVID-19 pandemic took hold in Canada, Mona Nemer as the Chief Science Advisor assembled the COVID-19 Expert Panel, a group of researchers and practitioners in infectious disease research and treatment, disease modeling and the behavioural sciences. This group of experts along with several other groups and task forces, has enabled throughout the pandemic emerging scientific information about COVID-19 to flow swiftly through to the Prime Minister and Cabinet.

The Chief Science Advisor and the expert groups have published several reports focusing on emerging issues brought on by the COVID-19 pandemic such as long-term care homes, COVID-19 in children, the role of ventilation and the considerations for using vaccine certifications.

==== Mandate renewal ====
On October 1, 2020, Prime Minister Justin Trudeau announced Nemer's reappointment for another two years, effective September 25, 2020.

On July 11, 2022, Prime Minister Justin Trudeau announced Nemer's reappointment for another two years, effective September 25, 2022.

On July 4, 2024, Prime Minister Justin Trudeau announced Nemer's reappointment for another three years, effective September 25, 2024.

== Controversies ==
On 27 March 2020, Nemer told the host of CBC Radio's Quirks and Quarks that the country needs randomly to test at least one per cent of the population to determine whether COVID-19 is as lethal as the population is led to believe. Nemer's "observations are right at the centre of a global clash of scientists over COVID-19 data and estimates of the seriousness of the pandemic," says Terence Corcoran, a writer at the National Post. Corcoran observed that the grim warnings of Neil Ferguson's team at Imperial College have been contradicted by Oxford University epidemiologists led by Sunetra Gupta. On 3 April, Corcoran pointed out that only proper sampling such as that advocated by Nemer will reveal the truth, and that in the omnishambles caused by reaction to the coronavirus pandemic, governments already have "adopted massive and unprecedented interventions into the economic and daily lives of every individual".

== Honours and awards ==
- 1994 – Marcel-Piché Prize
- 2001 – Fellow of the Royal Society of Canada
- 2003 – Léo-Pariseau Prize
- 2009 – Knight of the National Order of Merit (France)
- 2009 – Knight of the National Order of Quebec
- 2014 – Member of the Order of Canada
- 2018 – Arthur Wynne Gold Medal
- 2025 – Honorary Degree, Doctor of Science (Carleton University)

== Selected publications ==
- Bruneau, Benoit G.; Nemer, Georges; Schmitt, Joachim P.; Charron, Frédéric; Robitaille, Lynda; Caron, Sophie; Conner, David A.; Gessler, Manfred; Nemer, Mona (2001–09). "A Murine Model of Holt-Oram Syndrome Defines Roles of the T-box Transcription Factor Tbx5 in Cardiogenesis and Disease". Cell. 106 (6): 709–721. doi:10.1016/s0092-8674(01)00493-7.
- Genest, Jacques; McPherson, Ruth; Frohlich, Jiri; Anderson, Todd; Campbell, Norm; Carpentier, André; Couture, Patrick; Dufour, Robert; Fodor, George (2009–10). "2009 Canadian Cardiovascular Society/Canadian guidelines for the diagnosis and treatment of dyslipidemia and prevention of cardiovascular disease in the adult – 2009 recommendations". Canadian Journal of Cardiology. 25 (10): 567–579. doi:10.1016/s0828-282x(09)70715-9.
- Durocher, Daniel; Charron, Frédéric; Warren, René; Schwartz, Robert J.; Nemer, Mona (1997-09-15). "The cardiac transcription factors Nkx2‐5 and GATA‐4 are mutual cofactors". The EMBO Journal. 16 (18): 5687–5696. doi:10.1093/emboj/16.18.5687.
- Burns, Kimberly; Duggan, Brenda; Atkinson, Eric A.; Famulski, Konrad S.; Nemer, Mona; Bleackley, R. Chris; Michalak, Marek (1994–02). "Modulation of gene expression by calreticulin binding to the glucocorticoid receptor". Nature. 367 (6462): 476–480. doi:10.1038/367476a0.
- Paradis, Pierre; Dali-Youcef, Nassim; Paradis, François W.; Thibault, Gaétan; Nemer, Mona (2000-01-18). "Overexpression of angiotensin II type I receptor in cardiomyocytes induces cardiac hypertrophy and remodeling". Proceedings of the National Academy of Sciences. 97 (2): 931–936. doi:10.1073/pnas.97.2.931.
- Morin, Steves; Charron, Frédéric; Robitaille, Lynda; Nemer, Mona (2000-05-02). "GATA‐dependent recruitment of MEF2 proteins to target promoters". The EMBO Journal. 19 (9): 2046–2055. doi:10.1093/emboj/19.9.2046.
- Drouin, J.; Sun, Y.L.; Chamberland, M.; Gauthier, Y.; De Léan, A.; Nemer, M.; Schmidt, T.J. (1993–01). "Novel glucocorticoid receptor complex with DNA element of the hormone-repressed POMC gene". The EMBO Journal. 12 (1): 145–156. doi:10.1002/j.1460-2075.1993.tb05640.x.
- Grepin, C.; Nemer, G.; Nemer, M. (1997-06-15). "Enhanced cardiogenesis in embryonic stem cells overexpressing the GATA-4 transcription factor". Development. 124 (12): 2387–2395.
- Sepulveda, Jorge L.; Belaguli, Narashimaswamy; Nigam, Vishal; Chen, Ching-Yi; Nemer, Mona; Schwartz, Robert J. (1998-06-01). "GATA-4 and Nkx-2.5 Coactivate Nkx-2 DNA Binding Targets: Role for Regulating Early Cardiac Gene Expression". Molecular and Cellular Biology. 18 (6): 3405–3415. doi:10.1128/MCB.18.6.3405.
- Viger, R. S.; Mertineit, C.; Trasler, J. M.; Nemer, M. (1998-07-15). "Transcription factor GATA-4 is expressed in a sexually dimorphic pattern during mouse gonadal development and is a potent activator of the Mullerian inhibiting substance promoter". Development. 125 (14): 2665–2675.
