= Connaught Laboratories =

Canadian public health entity

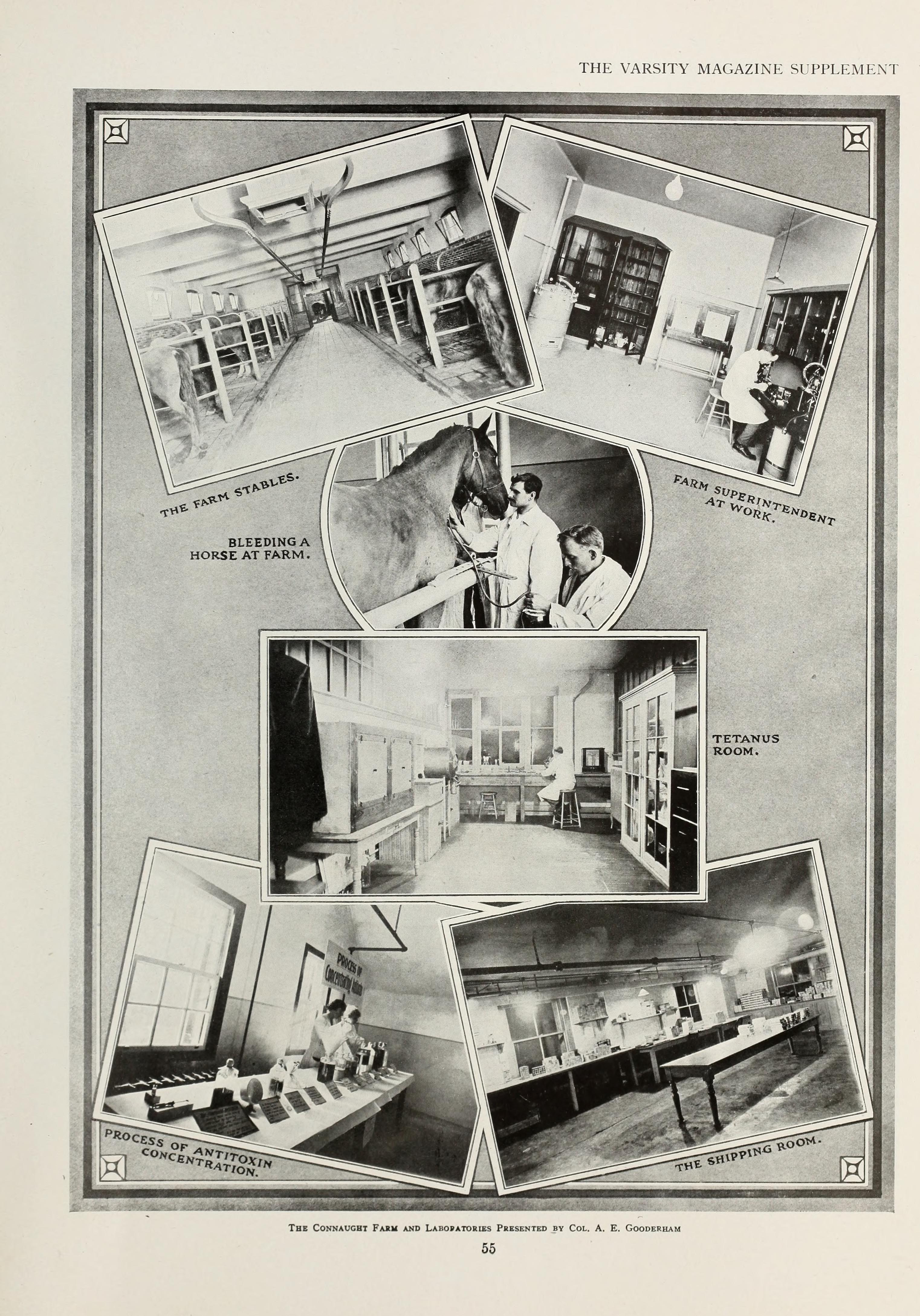
- The Varsity Magazine feature on Connaught Farm and Laboratories, 1917
- Founder: John G. FitzGerald
- Established: 1914
- Formerly called: Antitoxin Laboratory (1914), Connaught Antitoxin Laboratories and University Farm (1917)
- Location: Toronto, Ontario, Canada

The Connaught Medical Research Laboratories was a non-commercial public health entity established by Dr. John G. FitzGerald in 1914 in Toronto to produce the diphtheria antitoxin. Contemporaneously, the institution was likened to the Pasteur Institutes in France and Belgium and the Lister Institute in London. It expanded significantly after the discovery of insulin at the University of Toronto in 1921, manufacturing and distributing insulin at cost in Canada and overseas. Its non-commercial mandate mediated commercial interests and kept the medication accessible. In the 1930s, methodological advances at Connaught set a new international standard for insulin production.

Efforts at Connaught to purify heparin for human clinical trials laid the foundation for various critical surgeries, including vascular surgery, organ transplantation, and cardiac surgery. During the First and Second World Wars, the Labs produced various antitoxins that became crucial due to increased risks of injury, infection, and exposure to diseases in other parts of the world, including the typhus vaccine and penicillin. Connaught's production technologies also enabled the mass-scale field trial of Jonas Salk's polio vaccine and its subsequent expansion. The institution played a particularly important role in restoring the U.S. public faith in the polio vaccine after a production mishap at California-based Cutter Laboratories.

In 1972, the University of Toronto sold Connaught Laboratories to the Canada Development Corporation (CDC), a federally-controlled corporation charged with developing and maintaining Canadian-controlled companies in the private sector through a mixture of public and private investment. The sale continued to stir controversy in the following years as the labs increased prices on its products and came under allegations of mismanagement and deteriorated manufacturing standards. In 1986, the labs were transferred to private ownership as the CDC was dismantled as part of the Mulroney government's program of privatization. Connaught was merged with Institut Mérieux in 1989, and in 1999, it was transformed into the Canadian component of "Pasteur Mérieux Connaught," owned by Rhône-Poulenc. A series of acquisitions since then have transferred ownership of what used to be the Connaught Laboratories to the global vaccine business of Sanofi.

== History ==
=== Early history ===
At the turn of the 20th century, Canadian public health was defined by increasing local and provincial efforts to control the spread of infectious diseases which worsened with urbanization. In particular, diphtheria (known as "The Strangler" for its infection of the respiratory system) was the leading cause of death among Canadian children under 14 until the mid-1920s. In Ontario alone, 36,000 children died from diphtheria between 1880 and 1929. Research at the end of the 19th century, notably involving Pierre Paul Émile Roux and Alexandre Yersin of the Pasteur Institute as well as Emil von Behring and Kitasato Shibasaburō, had paved the way for diphtheria antitoxin production using horses. The antitoxin could save lives when given early enough in the course of the disease, and in large enough doses. Despite the developments, treatment was often too costly for middle-class families since Canadian public health efforts to counter the spread of diphtheria were largely dependent upon expensive imports from commercial U.S. firms.

In 1913, John G. FitzGerald took up a new role as a part-time Associate Professor of Hygiene at the University of Toronto. After becoming one of the youngest graduates of the University of Toronto Medical School in 1903, he spent a decade pursuing further study across North America and Europe, learning how to make antitoxins and observing novel approaches to public health education, research, and biological manufacture. Around that time, calls had mounted for a "Pasteur Institute" in Toronto following a rabies outbreak in southwestern Ontario, since the only closest-available source of life-saving treatment was in New York. FitzGerald worked with William Fenton to prepare the rabies vaccine. Following the success, they soon moved to tackle the lack of access to the diphtheria antitoxin with a commitment from Ontario's Chief Medical Officer that the Ontario Board of Health would buy the antitoxin at cost and ultimately distribute it for free. The initial work done with a stable of horses in Fenton's backyard proved successful, and in 1914 FitzGerald presented a plan to the Board of Governors of the University of Toronto which included dedicating any proceeds to the improvement of public health and education.

On May 1, 1914, the Antitoxin Laboratory was formally established in the Department of Hygiene. It was to be self-supporting and received no funds from the University. $500 in donations from Edmund Boyd Osler (Ontario politician), brother of the famous Canadian physician William Osler, helped establish the space which contained a general laboratory, a sterilising facility, and a small bacteriological lab. The lab soon began to produce the diphtheria antitoxin and Pasteur rabies treatment that would eventually be made available to all Canadians, regardless of class or income.

=== World War I: 1914-1918 ===
Canada entered World War I on August 4, 1914, and soon the need for antitoxins against tetanus became an urgent wartime matter. Robert Defries who joined the Antitoxin Lab in 1915 proposed that its operations be expanded to treat Canadian soldiers fighting trench warfare, for "not a fraction of the necessary amount [of tetanus antitoxin] was available". The proposal was quickly approved by the University of Toronto Board of Governors despite the lack of immediate funds, with University President Robert Falconer making an appeal to Prime Minister Robert Borden and the Ottawa administration. Shortly after, whisky magnate Colonel Albert Gooderham, then Chairman of the Red Cross Society funded an operation to equip the Lab with the capacity to produce a Canadian supply by August 1915. Gooderham had seen a need for antitoxins against tetanus, which had become an urgent wartime matter for the Canadian Expeditionary Force. He was impressed by the fledgling laboratory's capacity to produce the tetanus antitoxin in controlled conditions and at a lower price than the American sources the Red Cross had initially contacted. He turned over a 58-acre farm on Dufferin Street north of Toronto for a new production plant on condition that it be named after the Duke of Connaught, then Governor-General of Canada (1911-1916). In February 1916, the Ontario Board of Health began to distribute the Antitoxin Laboratory's products for free across the province. Other provincial governments soon followed suit, starting in Saskatchewan.

On October 25, 1917, the expanded lab was inaugurated under its new title, Connaught Antitoxin Laboratories and University Farm. John G. FitzGerald, the Director, was given full authority over the Labs' staff and the Connaught Laboratories Research Fund, which remained autonomous of University finances and supported the development of preventive medicine research. An Honorary Advisory Committee was also established so that Connaught would provide a truly national public health service, appointing representatives of each provincial government health department and the federal government to an annual meeting with FitzGerald.

By the end of the war in 1918, the Labs' wounded soldier treatment practices had reduced the rate of tetanus infection to 0.1%, making its anti-tetanus program one of the most successful health campaigns in wartime medicine. That same year, the Spanish flu spread across North America, spread in part through infected soldiers returning from overseas. Connaught swiftly intervened with large quantities of what Robert Defries described as an "experimental" vaccine, freely supplying it to health services and hospitals across the country as well as to several U.S. states and to Great Britain. While no claims for the effectiveness of the vaccine were made, it did no apparent harm and helped cement Connaught as a national public health centre in the minds of Canadian public health authorities.

The Spanish flu crisis revealed the inadequacies of Canadian public health infrastructure at the time. As a direct result, the government of Canada created the Department of Health in 1919. The new department's Dominion Council of Health had FitzGerald as its key member and took over the work of Connaught Labs' Honorary Advisory Committee. In April 1920, Connaught was granted a U.S. license. In July of the same year, it became an independent unit within the University of Toronto governed by a separate "Connaught Committee" of the Board of Governors.

=== Discovery and early development of insulin: 1921-1936 ===
==== Peacemaking ====
In 1921, the Ontario Royal Commission on University Finances reported that "the work of the Connaught Antitoxin Laboratories is analogous to that done in the Pasteur Institutes in France and Belgium and to that of the Lister Institute in London, with this advantage on the side of these Laboratories that the Connaught Antitoxin Laboratories are an organic part of the University, are self-supporting and provide funds and facilities for research in Preventive Medicine and also opportunity for graduate teaching in Public Health." That same year in the physiology laboratory two floors above FitzGerald's Connaught Labs office, Frederick Banting and Charles Best (medical scientist) under the auspices of J.J.R. Macleod successfully extracted insulin from the pancreas of dogs, fetal calves, and adult cows. In particular, Banting's experimental work with calf pancreas tissue took place at Connaught's farm site, where calves were involved in smallpox vaccine production. FitzGerald had arranged access to Connaught's modest facilities, along with $5,000 from the Labs' reserves, to expedite the team's work. In the months that followed, the researchers worked to refine the extracts to a degree safe for human injection with the help of biochemist James Collip. Tensions mounted during this time between the four "co-discovers" of insulin, exacerbated greatly by Collip's suggestion that he could return anytime to Alberta with his purification work and patent it. FitzGerald therefore stepped in as peacemaker to prepare a seminal research and development agreement between the Connaught Laboratories and the researchers. It established two key conditions: 1) that the collaborators would sign a contract agreeing not to take out a patent with a commercial pharmaceutical firm during an initial working period with Connaught; and 2) that no changes in the research policy would be allowed unless first discussed among FitzGerald and the four collaborators.

As clinical trials progressed through 1922, a number of early patients benefitted from the developments, including Leonard Thompson at the Toronto General Hospital, Elizabeth Hughes Gossett (daughter of U.S. Secretary of State Charles Evans Hughes), and future woodcut artist James D. Havens. In 1923, The Nobel Committee credited the practical extraction of insulin to the Toronto team and awarded the Nobel Prize in Physiology or Medicine to Frederick Banting (who shared his prize with Charles Best) and J.J.R. Macleod (who shared his prize with James Collip). The Insulin Committee of the Board of Governors of the University of Toronto was created in the same year to administer the patents (as previously agreed) and undertake licensing arrangements for the manufacture of insulin worldwide. The original committee consisted of John G. FitzGerald of Connaught, three University Governors, and the four co-discoverers. The authors registered the University of Toronto's commitment as a public institution "to ensure that, at the earliest possible date, adequate supplies of potent and non-toxic preparations of Insulin will be constantly and readily available at reasonable prices all over the world."

==== Improving production and affordability ====
By the summer of 1922, a number of key advances were made at Connaught to significantly increase insulin production. David Scott, whom FitzGerald had personally recruited for the task, successfully replaced Collip's alcohol-based method with acetone use to allow for consistent results during the three months prior to external collaboration. Peter J. Moloney pioneered an adsorption method using benzoic acid that reduced the amount of necessary alcohol/acetone to a minimal dose and eliminated far more protein material than had been previously possible. Some 250,000 units of insulin using the combination of these methods were produced at Connaught for clinical use in Toronto during the fall of 1922, with "very satisfactory results," according to Best and Scott. By early November, Connaught was producing about 1 litre of insulin per week. Nonetheless, large-scale manufacture of insulin at Connaught reached its limits, prompting the researchers to contract with Eli Lilly and Company to increase production and accept patents in Canada, the United States, and Great Britain. Banting objected initially to the taking out of patents and the charging of royalties for the manufacture of insulin; the Canadian patent was sold to the University of Toronto for a symbolic dollar. Following the discovery of the isoelectric point for insulin, Eli Lilly hoped to win an insulin production patent for itself but could not due to a similar and concurrent discovery by Michael Somogyi, Phillip Shaffer and E. A. Doisy at Washington University in St. Louis, news of which had already reached the researchers in Toronto. To prevent related legal complications, Connaught's Assistant Director and Head of the Insulin Division Robert Defries worked to establish an "innovative patent pooling policy". The policy outlined that "it shall be required of all licenses that any patents taken out by them shall be assigned to the University of Toronto who may then authorize other licensees to use the methods patented, in other words the policy of pooling the patents was decided upon." Based on a November 1923 Insulin Committee report, patents and trade marks had "been applied for in Egypt, Palestine, etc., Japan, and South Africa". Nobel prize-winning physiologist August Krogh was given permission to manufacture insulin in Denmark while visiting Toronto in 1922, and a Danish patent was granted in February 1924 via Løvens kemiske Fabrik (now LEO Pharma). In the second half of 1923, Connaught's insulin operations were expanded into a sizeable "factory" at a vacant YMCA building that was transformed through a mix of donations and government grants. The main purpose of the expansion was to lower the cost of insulin as much as possible. As Defries told the press, Connaught "would now be able to produce enough insulin for all of Canada in the new facility and at a steadily declining price." By November, Connaught was producing 250,000 units of insulin weekly; the average diabetic needed 15-20 units every day. It exported to countries across the globe entirely at the cost of materials and production, since Connaught was "not engaged in commercial business."

During this period, Connaught was the world's primary driver of research and innovation in insulin production as well as some of its earlier specialisations including the diphtheria antitoxin. The lab's relevant advances are reflected in scientific publications of the time by Peter Moloney, David Scott, and Charles Best. Rockefeller Foundation noted the surrounding development of public health services and services in Toronto and met with John G. FitzGerald, Director of Connaught Laboratories, in its search to found a third school of public health (the first two being at Johns Hopkins University and Harvard University). Shortly after, it approved the creation of the School of Hygiene at the University of Toronto. The School of Hygiene opened its doors in June 1927. Connaught and the School shared their administration under FitzGerald's directorship, the School serving as the academic research and teaching arm of the Labs and the Hygiene Building also accommodating much of the Labs' operational facilities.

In 1926, John Jacob Abel at Johns Hopkins University discovered a method to crystallize insulin to a purer form, but only in small quantities with a shorter lifespan. A team at Connaught led by David Scott and assisted by Arthur Charles and Albert Fisher refined this process into 1933 to consistently produce highly pure insulin. Charles and Fisher prepared a new international standard for insulin, the first in crystalline form. In 1936, Fisher and Scott built upon the work of Hans Christian Hagedorn, one of Banting and Best's original Danish collaborators (along with August Krogh), to formulate protamine zinc insulin. This was the first long-acting alternative to regular insulin.

=== Preventing diphtheria: 1924-1927 ===
Initially established in 1914 to produce the diphtheria antitoxin, the Connaught Laboratories continued to prioritize the eradication of diphtheria. Though the institution's efforts had made the antitoxin freely available to the public, the disease remained one of the leading public health threats to children under 14. The objective was to move from treatment to prevention.

In 1924, John G. FitzGerald visited the Pasteur Institute to meet with Gaston Ramon, who had recently discovered that treating a potent diphtheria toxin with formaldehyde and heat could make it non-toxic (resulting in a toxoid), making it safe for vaccination. Since Ramon could only test the effectiveness of the toxoid on a small scale in his lab, FitzGerald cabled Ramon's methods to Peter Moloney and requested that he "drop everything and immediately begin preparing and improving the toxoid". In 1925, Edith M. Taylor joined Connaught Laboratories and contributed immensely to improving the culturing process.

Trials in Toronto soon proved to be a success, demonstrating immunity in staff members given the toxoid. Field trials were soon launched, beginning in Windsor, Ontario. Between September 1925 and February 1927, some 120,000 individuals in 9 provinces were vaccinated. During the initial uses, allergic reactions were reported among older children already immune to diphtheria. Moloney developed a simple reaction test (which came to be known as the "Moloney Test") to test for potential reactors to avoid the issue.

The results of toxoid use in Hamilton, Ontario were particularly significant and widely recognized. In 1922, there were 747 cases and 32 deaths due to diphtheria in Hamilton. By 1927, the numbers had fallen to 11 cases and 1 death. In 1931, there were only 5 cases and no deaths. A year later, there was a single case and no deaths.

=== Development of heparin: 1928-1930s ===
Heparin is a blood thinner (anticoagulant), originally discovered in 1916 by Jay McLean and William Henry Howell at Johns Hopkins University. However, the crude substance was toxic and could only be extracted in small quantities. As co-discoverer of insulin Charles Best returned from his postgraduate studies in Europe to continue as Connaught's Assistant Director, he began a program in 1928 to purify heparin for clinical use. This direction of development benefitted from Connaught's experience with insulin production and ongoing arrangements with Canadian meat processors to obtain research material.

In 1933, Arthur Charles and David Scott published the first papers on increasing the yield of heparin by rotting source tissues. By 1936, Charles and Scott managed to crystallise the heparin extract into a dry form that could be administered in a salt solution. This became Connaught's second product, after insulin, to be recognised as an international standard. Gordon Murray, a prominent surgeon based at Toronto General Hospital, demonstrated that heparin effectively cleared up internal blood clots and that it showed promise in dangerous operations in which blood would otherwise thicken too quickly.

Initial clinical trials, begun in April 1937 or slightly earlier with cruder forms, involved hundreds of complex surgical cases "in which heparin played an essential and often dramatic life-saving role". The advances that made heparin a safe, easily available and effective anticoagulant were welcomed internationally, and laid the foundation for vascular surgery, organ transplants, and open-heart surgery. The developments also allowed Gordon Murray to pioneer the artificial kidney in North America.

=== World War II: 1939-1945 ===
Canada entered World War II on September 10, 1939. In 1940, Connaught lost its founder and director Dr. John G. FitzGerald to mental health struggles. Robert Defries, who had already been leading much of the Labs' efforts through the 1930s, stepped in to fill the role of director of Connaught Laboratories and of the School of Hygiene.

This period saw the rapid expansion of Connaught's research capacities to accommodate the military demands of protection against tetanus, typhus, and other bacterial infections. The Labs began the war with a staff of 252; peaked at 1,500 staff in 1944; and ended the war with a staff of 800. The period also saw heavy collaboration with other local researchers at Banting Institute (named after Frederick Banting) and the Department of Bacteriology, both at the University of Toronto. In 1943, Connaught acquired more processing space at One Spadina Crescent, a building originally established for Knox College, then during World War I (WWI) used for Spadina Military Hospital, where Amelia Earhart had worked as a nurse aide.

==== Tetanus ====
Connaught's previous efforts during World War I (1914-1918) had led to a highly successful campaign focusing on the treatment of affected soldiers. In 1927, Connaught had begun to build on recent advances by Gaston Ramon at Pasteur Institute to develop various toxoids (inactivated toxins used to vaccinate against future infections).

During WWII, Connaught intensified research on the tetanus toxoid to eliminate its negative side effects and scale production. Edith M. Taylor led these efforts, building on previous successes with the diphtheria toxoid. Her methods for preparing the tetanus toxin (from which the toxoid was prepared) used a culture far more sophisticated than commercially available options, and yielded a more potent toxoid which was free of any negative side-effects. Taylor's work during this time led to her being awarded the Order of the British Empire at the end of the war.

==== Typhus ====
Typhus is a group of infectious bacterial diseases often spread through lice, fleas, and mites. Typhus fever, spread by the body louse, had ravaged both the military and civilian populations of Eastern Europe throughout WWI and continued to plague the European populace. While no typhus vaccine was available at the beginning of WWII, there had been promising research by the United States Public Health Service and the Harvard School of Public Health. At Connaught Laboratories, James Craigie launched a federally supported research program in July 1940 seeking to build on these findings. Their efforts culminated in a much richer bacterial culture and an improved ether-based purification method which lay the foundations for a large-scale vaccine production program in August 1942, overseen by Drs. Laurella McClelland and Raymond Parker. The operation proved successful, and the vaccine was soon made available to Canadian as well as British and American troops. At peak, one million doses were produced each month at Connaught. Craigie received the United States of America Typhus Commission Medal after the war for his pioneering work.

==== Blood processing ====
As violence mounted across the theatres of war, so did the need for blood transfusion to wounded soldiers. In 1941, Connaught undertook an initiative to dramatically expand the capacity for blood processing into freeze-dried serum, which could be transported more effectively than liquid blood. By March 1942, more than 11,000 blood donations were collected monthly through the national Red Cross. By October, over 57,000 donations were received monthly. Over the course of the war, Connaught received more than 2.5 million blood donations which made it possible to furnish 500,000 bottles of dried serum.

To accommodate the increasing need for processing space, some peacetime projects were stopped or crowded together to make room. The former Knox College building on One Spadina Crescent was purchased in August 1943, further expanding the capacity for dried serum production. Connaught contributed all space and services without charge.

==== Penicillin ====
Penicillin was discovered in 1928 by Alexander Fleming, who noticed airborne moulds (later identified as penicillum) on his Petri dish that seemed to be inhibiting bacterial growths. These initial findings received little attention, however, although Fleming did conduct several experiments on the antibiotic substance to stabilize the compound and prove its safety for human use. Researchers at Connaught Laboratories' neighbouring Banting Institute had also requested a small sample, but had not pursued further development. Then in 1941, a team led by Howard Florey at the University of Oxford completed an initial re-investigation of the properties and preparation methods of penicillin. In recognition of this work, the Nobel Prize was awarded in 1945 to Fleming, Florey, and Chain.

War meant a greater incidence of wound infections, often by staphylococcus ("staph") and streptococcus ("strep") bacteria. Since demand was high and it took weeks to cultivate penicillin, the supply of penicillin ran out. Therefore, Howard Florey and Norman Heatley accepted an invitation by the Rockefeller Foundation to come to North America to round up production capacity. In Toronto, Drs. Phillip Greey and Alice Gray of the University of Toronto Department of Pathology and Bacteriology began this work in collaboration with Drs. C.C. Lucas and S.F. MacDonald of the Banting Institute.

Following initial advances in chemical preparation, the National Research Council of Canada arranged for large-scale production via the Connaught Laboratories in 1943. The work "was carried on twenty-four hours a day, seven days a week", and involved heavy collaboration across Boston, Toronto, New York, and Oxford. It was effectively "a major military operation at the Labs", orchestrated with an eye to the "D-Day" landings in occupied France in June 1944.

=== Trial and expansion of the polio vaccine: 1946-1960s ===
Throughout the first half of the 20th century, polio outbreaks grew larger and more severe as the disease struck most provinces from west to east. In 1953, Canada's worst polio epidemic year, a total of almost 9,000 cases had claimed the lives of 494 people across the country.

In 1946, Robert Defries, Director of Connaught Laboratories, began an initiative to tackle the growing polio problem. To reflect the institution's expanding scope of virology research, Connaught was renamed "Connaught Medical Research Laboratories". The initiative benefitted from a surge in available polio research funding, particularly from the United States where Franklin D. Roosevelt's personal polio experience had led to the establishment of the National Foundation for Infantile Paralysis (NFIP), later renamed March of Dimes. First recruited to the polio initiative were Clennel van Rooyen and Andrew J. Rhodes. Following an especially severe epidemic that struck the Inuit community of igluligaarjuk in the Northwest Territories, the Labs' Arctic investigations revealed that polio had very little to do with geography or a summer "polio season", factors that had been thought to affect transmissibility of the disease.

In 1949, researchers at Connaught discovered a purely synthetic blend of 60 ingredients that efficiently fed the cells required to cultivate viruses. They named it "Medium 199", having hit upon the mix after 198 attempts and more than two years or experimentation. In November 1951, the Medium 199 team supplied the poliovirus research team with a sample that effectively resolved the roadblocks that poliovirus research had run into in cultivating the poliovirus. News of the success reached Jonas Salk in Pittsburgh, who upon receiving the supply of Medium 199 was able to prepare a small supply of the polio vaccine for its first human use. Meanwhile, Leone N. Farrell, also a researcher at Connaught and one of the few women to earn a Ph.D. in the sciences in the first half of the twentieth century, led progress in large-scale production methods. In early July 1953, National Foundation for Infantile Paralysis sponsored a mass field trial across 44 U.S. States, Canada, and Helsinki, Finland. Connaught became responsible for the field trial supply of bulk poliovirus fluids and shipped out some 3,000 litres of it. On April 12, 1955, the vaccine was announced to be 60-90% effective against the three antigenic types of poliovirus and was immediately licensed for use in the U.S. and Canada.

In the U.S., licenses for vaccine production were granted to five pharmaceutical companies: Eli Lilly, Parke-Davis, Wyeth, Pitman-Moore, and Cutter. Shortly thereafter, in what became known as the Cutter incident, some batches of the vaccine from California's Cutter Laboratories led to an outbreak of polio and was immediately recalled. The Epidemic Intelligence Service of the Communicable Disease Center found that two production pools made by Cutter Laboratories contained live poliovirus. The U.S. Surgeon General suspended the country's entire vaccine program on May 7, 1955.

In Canada, Connaught's vaccine was the only version in use and had demonstrated no cases of polio linked with its production. Therefore, Canadian use of the vaccine continued uninterrupted. Political and public health confidence in the vaccine north of the border during the Cutter incident helped pave the way for the U.S. to resume polio immunizations in July 1955.

The Connaught Laboratories continued to improve and expand polio vaccine production during the latter half of the 1950s and into the early 1960s.

=== Eradicating smallpox: 1960s-early 1970s ===
==== Pre-1960s ====
Smallpox is a highly contagious disease that has been fatal throughout most of recorded human history. Various techniques of variolation (protection against smallpox) have been documented globally, the most prominent records of established practice dating back to the Ming dynasty (present-day China) in the 15th century. In Europe, variolation was taken up in the 18th century via Constantinople. At the turn of the century into the 19th, a number of individuals including Benjamin Jesty and Edward Jenner began to demonstrate considerable success using a vaccine made from cowpox material. Variolation eventually declined as vaccines were shown to be effective and became better appreciated.

In present-day Canada, the history of smallpox stretches back to European contact with indigenous peoples in the 17th century. Since the aboriginal demographic had no natural immunity, smallpox devastated populations that settlers made contact with. It spread first in New France near Tadoussac in 1616 and quickly reached tribes in the Maritimes, James Bay, and Great Lakes area. It reached the west coastal regions of Canada in the 1780s. On numerous occasions, the disease was used with official sanction by British troops as a form of germ warfare to suppress indigenous populations. After the smallpox vaccine was brought to Canada in 1796 by John Clinch, more concerted efforts were made to stem the further spread of smallpox.

Between 1885 and 1907, Dr. Alexander Stewart's Ontario Vaccine Farm in Palmerston, Ontario successfully provided a dependable supply of vaccines to much of Canada. In 1916, the newly-established Connaught Laboratories purchased the equipment of the Ontario Vaccine Farm and took over the production process to bring domestic incidence under control by the 1940s. The Institut de microbiologie et d'hygiène (now INRS-Institut Armand-Frappier) at the Université de Montréal began preparing the smallpox vaccine in 1939, primarily for distribution in Québec.

==== Collaboration with the World Health Organization ====
In addition to Canada's routine, domestic immunization needs, demand for Connaught's smallpox vaccine had expanded through the war years given military needs and the growing scale of transnational medical operations. Simultaneously, the pharmaceutical industry was drastically transformed by such interlinked factors as the post-war boom, factory-based mass-production, increased barriers to entry, and heavy consolidation of private industry (in 1951 alone, Pfizer opened subsidiaries in nine new countries). Small domestic producers fell under foreign control as they were unable to compete on the scale demanded by the new technology. Given these developments, by the 1950s the Labs' leadership saw a necessary and advantageous niche in the growing international market for the smallpox vaccine.

To meet demands for transportability and a longer shelf-life, Connaught began its efforts to produce a dried version of the vaccine under Cleeve R. Amies, previously of the Lister Institute. In 1967, the institution entered into formal collaboration with the World Health Organization (WHO) on its smallpox eradication program. Under the leadership of Robert J. Wilson (then Assistant Director of Connaught) and Paul Fenje, Connaught assumed regional responsibility for the smallpox eradication effort in Latin America, especially in Brazil. Their early efforts focused on ensuring the availability of high-quality local vaccine supplies. WHO codified vaccine production standards in its document, Methodology of Freeze-dried Smallpox Vaccine Production, based largely on Connaught's experience and Wilson and Fenje's initiative. By the fall of 1968, five of the major vaccine producers in Latin America were meeting, or almost meeting, the requisite standards of adequate potency, stability and bacteriological sterility. In 1969, Connaught was designated as the WHO Regional Reference Centre for Smallpox Vaccine in the Region of the Americas.

Globally, approximately 50 million cases still occurred each year in the 1950s. Through transnational collaboration, this figure was reduced significantly to 10-15 million cases in 1967. The last naturally occurring case was confirmed in Somalia on October 26, 1977. Smallpox was declared eradicated by the World Health Organization in 1980.

== Ownership transfer and privatization ==
=== Transfer to the Canada Development Corporation ===
Beginning in the mid-1960s the University of Toronto began to question its continued ownership of Connaught. As the University's Connaught Fund states in an historical note: "The consolidation of the Labs' operations at the Steeles Ave. site, especially since the Labs' 1955 administrative split from the School of Hygiene underscored its geographic distance from the main University campus (20 km), as well as a growing academic separation. There was a clear drift in what had been more common scientific and research enterprises and in the opportunities for teaching and the supervision of graduate studies by cross-appointed members of Connaught's staff. In addition, sharply rising regulatory demands, a growing export business and intensified international competition, created a challenging situation. New production facilities, built to meet higher standards, were urgently needed. Yet, the self-sufficient Labs' resources were limited and the University was struggling to meet demands brought on by the post-war baby boom generation coming of age. During 1971-72, this sense of uncertainty sharply intensified, especially after the University received a compelling offer to buy Connaught Laboratories and transform it into a profit-oriented company." The University used proceeds of the sale to establish the Connaught Fund, which supports graduate students, early-career researchers, interdisciplinary teams, and innovators.

In June 1972, the Connaught Medical Research Laboratories was sold to the Canada Development Corporation (CDC) for $25 million (Canadian Dollars) and became known as "Connaught Laboratories Limited". Logistically, it was incorporated as "CDC Life Sciences Inc." under the CDC's healthcare division titled "ConnLab Holdings Ltd." At the time the CDC, charged with developing and maintaining Canadian-controlled companies in the private sector through a mixture of public and private investment, was federally owned. Nonetheless, the sale continued to stir controversy in the following years as the Labs became profit-driven and became subject to governmental investigation under allegations of mismanagement and deteriorated manufacturing standards. By 1974, Connaught had increased prices with one-day notice on most products, including insulin, such that one report noted that "some of its insulin wholesale prices became higher than the top U.S. retail prices found in a check just across the border at Niagara Falls." A more serious faux pas was noted in regard to an unannounced increase in the potency of a smallpox vaccine which caused strong reactions in patients and alarmed health authorities in Saskatchewan. The following February, The Globe and Mail ran a series of articles inquiring into Connaught's activities under the CDC. A separate review in 1989 reiterated that "staff was cut and plans were made to sell land and other assets to raise cash to cover financial mismanagement."

=== Expansion into the United States ===
In 1978, Connaught expanded into the United States with the acquisition of a vaccine production facility in Swiftwater, Pennsylvania. The expansion established "Connaught Laboratories Inc.", a U.S. subsidiary of Connaught Laboratories Ltd. The acquired facility was previously operated by Merrell-National Laboratories, the largest producer of swine flu vaccine in the U.S. Government's ill-fated mass immunization program in 1976 and the sole source of the yellow fever vaccine in the United States.

The expansion consisted of a three-way deal between Connaught Laboratories Ltd., Richardson-Merrell Inc., and the Salk Institute for Biological Studies. The Salk Institute would take over the entirety of Richarson-Merrell's research and production plant as the company exited the market. Connaught would acquire the vaccine manufacturing facilities from the Salk Institute.

=== Privatization and sale to Institut Mérieux ===
By 1984, government enterprise had become unfashionable under Brian Mulroney and CDC Life Sciences was sold to the private sector. Its holdings, including Connaught, were sold through two public issues in 1984 and in 1987. As the shares were sold off, CDC Life Sciences Inc. was renamed "Connaught Biosciences Inc." on July 4, 1988.

In April 1988, Institut Mérieux of France tried to buy a controlling stake in Connaught, but was blocked by the Ontario and Quebec securities commissions because the acquisition favoured one group of shareholders over others. A year later on 7 March 1989, Institut Mérieux proposed a merger between Connaught and its drug division that would result in Mérieux owning 51% of the combined operations. The move was rejected by shareholders. In September 1989, Swiss-based Ciba-Geigy (now Novartis) and California-based Chiron Corporation made a joint offer of $30-a-share (US$764 million). Institut Mérieux made yet another bid for Connaught, topping the joint offer with a bid of $37-a-share (US$813 million). In October, the Canadian government rejected the initial bid on the ground that the offer could not be judged as being of "net benefit" to Canada. At that time, Connaught was the world's largest manufacturer of influenza vaccines but no longer manufactured insulin, instead "ironically ... selling insulin products made by Novo Nordisk Group of Denmark."

Since the 1972 sale of the laboratories to the CDC stipulated that the drug firm could not be sold to a foreign-owned company, the University of Toronto opposed the merger "on the ground that a foreign takeover would mean a loss of research spending and jobs in Canada." It took Connaught to court seeking an injunction to block the sale, but withdrew its objection following an agreement with Mérieux that medical research support would continue if the company's bid succeeded. The Canadian government approved the bid for Connaught in December 1989. The move was criticized by many, including Liberal MP Jim Peterson, who was critical of Brian Mulroney's industrial policy and voiced that "no other industrialized country ... would permit the takeover of its leading biotechnology firm."

Connaught was sold to Mérieux, and transformed into the North American component of Pasteur Mérieux Connaught (PMC) owned by Mérieux's parent company, Rhône-Poulenc. Since ownership of Connaught had been transferred, "Connaught Biosciences Inc." was formally dissolved in 1990. A decade later in 1999, Rhône-Poulenc merged with Hoechst of Germany to create Aventis. PMC thus became Aventis-Pasteur, a subsidiary of Aventis devoted to vaccines. In 2004, Aventis was acquired by Sanofi. Aventis-Pasteur, the vaccine subsidiary, became Sanofi Pasteur.

Today, the Connaught Laboratories' facilities are known as the "Connaught Campus" of Sanofi Pasteur.

== See also ==
- Sanofi Pasteur - global vaccine business and subsidiary of Sanofi; institution resulted from a series of mergers after Pasteur-owned Institut Mérieux acquired Connaught in 1989 (see: History of Diabetes#Privatization and sale to Institut Mérieux)
- Dalla Lana School of Public Health - present-day incarnation of the intimately connected University of Toronto School of Hygiene, opened in 1927
- 1 Spadina Crescent - home to Connaught's expanded facilities, 1943-1972
- John G. FitzGerald - Director of Connaught Laboratories, 1914-1940
- Robert Defries - Director of Connaught Laboratories, 1940-1955
- Charles Herbert Best - co-discoverer of insulin; Director of Insulin Division of Connaught Laboratories, 1922–25; Assistant Director of Connaught, 1925-1931; Associate Director of Connaught, 1931-1941
- Diphtheria antitoxin - one of Connaught's focus areas of development since inception
- Insulin (medication) - stabilizing medication for diabetes developed and distributed in Canada/overseas by Connaught
- Tetanus toxoid - used to vaccinate against tetanus; developed at Connaught during WWII
- Penicillin - antibiotic; mass-produced for military needs during WWII
- Heparin - anticoagulant developed for clinical use at Connaught
- Polio vaccine - co-developed and produced by Connaught in the mid-1900s
