= Lawrence Loh =

Canadian physician and public servant

Peel Medical Officer of Health
- In office July 2020 – September 2022
- Interim; March 2020 – June 2020
- Interim; March 2017 – September 2017

Peel Associate Medical Officer of Health
- In office January 2016 – March 2020

Public Health Physician, Public Health Ontario
- In office January 2015 – December 2015
- Premier: Kathleen Wynne

Senior Medical Consultant, Ontario Ministry of Health and Long-Term Care
- In office January 2015 – December 2015
- Premier: Kathleen Wynne

Medical Health Officer, Fraser Health Authority
- In office August 2013 – January 2015

Medical Specialist, Public Health Agency of Canada
- In office September 2012 – August 2013
- Prime Minister: Stephen Harper

Personal details
- Born: London, Ontario, Canada
- Education: University of Western Ontario, BSc; University of Western Ontario, M.D. Johns Hopkins Bloomberg School of Public Health, MPH; University of Toronto, FRCPC
- Occupation: Physician

Lawrence C. Loh is a Canadian physician best known for having served as Medical Officer of Health for the Regional Municipality of Peel during the COVID-19 pandemic.

He was also the sixth Executive Director and Chief Executive Officer of the College of Family Physicians of Canada.

== Early life and education ==
Loh grew up in London, Ontario to Malaysian parents of Chinese descent. He grew up speaking English at home and not Mandarin. When Loh was 14, the family briefly moved back to Malaysia in Petaling Jaya for five years. After relocating back to London, Ontario, Loh attended University of Western Ontario for his undergraduate degree and also medical school. He subsequently completed residency at the University of Toronto in Public Health and Preventive Medicine.

== Career ==
Loh practiced family medicine in Brampton before specializing in public health. He subsequently worked in public health agencies at all three levels of government in two different provinces before being offered the job of Associate Medical Officer of Health for Peel Region in 2016 by Eileen de Villa (then Medical Officer of Health for Peel, who later joined Toronto Public Health).

=== Academic career ===
Loh is an adjunct professor at the University of Toronto Dalla Lana School of Public Health.

=== Medical Officer of Health during COVID-19 ===
Loh was the Medical Officer of Health for Peel Region throughout the first two years of COVID-19 pandemic in the Regional Municipality of Peel. He was appointed as the interim Medical Officer of Health for Peel Region in March 2020 before occupying the position permanently a few months later. In April 2021, Loh notably broke from the approach taken by the province and ordered Peel Region schools closed, as well as an Amazon Fulfillment Facility closed, both of which were accomplished through section 22 orders.

During Asian Heritage Month in May 2021, Loh was recognized in the Senate of Canada by Senator Victor Oh. In his intervention, Senator Oh hailed Loh as a hero in the community, citing that Loh's "forward thinking and resolve [...] were instrumental in containing COVID-19 transmission in one of the country's hardest Regions."

The Key to the City of Mississauga was presented to Loh on March 3, 2022, by Mayor Bonnie Crombie to recognize his role in the city's pandemic response.
