= Eileen de Villa =

Canadian physician and public servant

5th Toronto Medical Officer of Health
- In office March 27, 2017 – December 31, 2024
- Preceded by: David McKeown
- Succeeded by: Na-Koshie Lamptey (acting)

Peel Region Medical Officer of Health
- In office October 2015 – March 2017

Personal details
- Born: 1969 (age 56–57) Boston, Massachusetts, U.S.
- Children: 3
- Education: McGill University, BSc (1991); University of Toronto, MD, MHSc (1998); Schulich School of Business, MBA

Eileen Patricia de Villa is a Canadian physician and public servant who was the medical officer of health for the City of Toronto from 2017 to 2024, leading the Toronto Public Health unit.

She is an adjunct professor at the Dalla Lana School of Public Health at the University of Toronto. De Villa is most well known for her role in Toronto's response to the COVID-19 pandemic. She was formerly the medical officer of health for Peel Region.

== Early life and education ==
De Villa is the daughter of cardiologist Dr. Maria Antonina "Nenette" de Villa and obstetrician/gynecologist Dr. Guillermo "Jun" de Villa. She was born in Boston, Massachusetts, and briefly lived in the Philippines between 1972 and 1975 before her family fled to Canada. Her parents were both influential in the Filipino community in Toronto, laying the groundwork for what is now the Filipino Centre Toronto.

She attended Havergal College then McGill University, where she received her bachelor of science (BSc) degree in psychology and women's studies in 1991. When she graduated, she became an intern at the United Nations, moving to Vienna to work with the UN Industrial Development Organization supporting developing countries. Through that experience, she became interested in international health.

She then received her master of health science (MHSc) degree in health promotion at the University of Toronto and continued securing internships through the United Nations, including one with the International Conference on Population and Development.

De Villa then decided to go to medical school, receiving her doctor of medicine (MD) degree from the University of Toronto in 1998. She completed her residency in family medicine in 2000 and in community medicine (public health) in 2004. She later received a master of business administration (MBA) degree from the Schulich School of Business at York University.

== Career ==
De Villa has worked as a public health physician since 2004, for the Region of Peel from 2004 to 2017 (including as medical officer of health) and City of Toronto since 2017, serving as the medical officer of health.

De Villa sits on the McGill Women, Leadership & Philanthropy Board, working to increase the representation of women in positions of leadership, governance, and philanthropy.

=== Peel Region ===
In 2004, de Villa began her almost thirteen year tenure at the Regional Municipality of Peel Office of Health, where she ultimately became the medical officer of health, serving from October 2015 to March 2017. There, she worked on a number of public health issues, including vaccination and prevention of communicable diseases, such as sexually transmitted infections and tuberculosis. She also oversaw the region's air quality and food and water safety. In 2016, de Villa offered a job as Associate Medical Officer of Health to Dr. Lawrence Loh, who later took over her position at Peel Region.

=== Toronto Medical Officer of Health ===
On March 27, 2017, de Villa began her term as the medical officer of health at Toronto Public Health following the retirement of David McKeown. She was appointed for her evidence-based approach to public health.

==== Opioid epidemic ====
She has worked to combat the opioid epidemic in Toronto, advocating for a series of policies to expand public health services. Her recommended policies include the creation of a safer drug supply to reduce the need to buy drugs off the street, better support for under-served populations, and decriminalizing drugs. In 2019, she pushed back against budget cuts proposed by the Progressive Conservative government of Premier Doug Ford, which would limit the city's resources for fighting the opioid crisis and other public health programs. She has also criticized the province for defunding supervised injection sites, which have reversed a significant number of overdoses since opening.

Under her leadership, Toronto Public Health has worked to combat misinformation around vaccine safety and has advocated for advertisers and social media platforms to clamp down on misleading anti-vaccination information. She was also behind the call to ban vaccine exemptions because of religious or philosophical beliefs, though the government would still allow medical exemptions. Toronto has seen a steady rise of such exemptions and are working to proactively prevent outbreaks of vaccine-preventable diseases.

=== COVID-19 pandemic ===
As Medical Officer of Health, de Villa has been leading the public health response to the COVID-19 pandemic in Toronto since the city saw its first case of COVID-19 on January 25, 2020.

==== Initial response (spring/summer 2020) ====
In April 2020, de Villa initially used her authority under section 22 of the Health Protection and Promotion Act to order all individuals with COVID-19—as well as those who have been in contact with confirmed cases—to remain home for 14 days. Throughout the COVID-19 response, she has advised Mayor John Tory on measures the municipal government could take, such as declaring a state of emergency—which allows the mayor to assume the powers of Toronto City Council and expedite legislation—introducing a physical distancing bylaw in parks, and advised City Council to pass a bylaw mandating face masks.

==== Second wave (fall 2020/winter 2021) ====
While COVID-19 case numbers remained stable throughout the summer, in September 2020 de Villa warned of a resurgence in cases based on data from other jurisdictions, urging provincial and municipal leaders to develop new measures for the coming months. On September 29, Premier Doug Ford conceded that the province was experiencing a second wave and began to study implementing a new restrictions framework.

==== Third wave (spring 2021) ====
The provincial government began loosening restrictions in March 2021, with de Villa expressing concerns regarding the growing presence of COVID-19 variants in the city and urging caution. De Villa urged the province to enhance its measures, and amidst a rapid increase in cases and growing ICU occupancy in April 2021, the provincial government issued a new stay-at-home order on April 8. De Villa warned that the rate of daily cases may outpace the ability to roll out vaccines, and that the city remained at risk, even with new restrictions. She issued a section 22 order on April 6, closing Toronto schools from April 7 to April 19, a day after Dr. Lawrence Loh of the Region of Peel issued a similar order for its schools. The Ontario government shortly ordered all schools closed province-wide, following a record number of cases, just a day after education minister Stephen Lecce insisted schools remained safe. The province took further action on April 16, announcing new restrictions and enhanced enforcement measures. On April 20, in conjunction with Peel Region's public health unit, Toronto Public Health announced that de Villa would issue section 22 orders to close workplaces with active COVID-19 outbreaks. De Villa and Loh also called on the Ford government to restore paid sick leave, which would reduce income disruption for workers isolating due to COVID-19.

==== Leave of absence ====
On December 7, 2021, de Villa announced that she would be taking a leave of absence until December 20 in order to have surgery to address a mass of pre-cancerous cells, initially discovered following a mammogram she had in the summer. Deputy Medical Officer of Health Dr. Na-Koshie Lamptey would serve as Medical Officer of Health during her absence. De Villa took the opportunity to encourage others to ensure they keep up with routine health screenings to catch problems early.

On May 14, 2024, she announced that she would resign from her Toronto Medical Officer of Health position on December 31, 2024.

== Awards and honours ==
- Distinguished Leader Award, McGill Toronto Excellence Awards, 2019
- Naimark Award, Canadian Foundation for Healthcare Improvement, 2013
