= Timeline of the COVID-19 pandemic in Ontario (2021) =

Sequence of major events in a virus pandemic

The following is a timeline of the COVID-19 pandemic in Ontario throughout 2021.

== Timeline ==
=== January ===
Date	Cases		Recoveries		Deaths		Hospitalizations			Sources
Date	New	Total	New	Total	New	Total	Total	ICU	Ventilators	Sources
1	2,476	-	-	-	-	-	-	-	-	
2	3,363	187,998	-	-	95	4,626	1,000	322	220	
3	2,964	190,962	-	162,701	25	4,650	998	329	228	
4	3,270	194,232	2,074	164,775	29	4,697	1,190	333	194	
5	3,128	197,360	2,015	166,790	51	4,730	1,347	352	245	
6	3,266	200,626	3,005	169,795	37	4,767	1,463	361	246	
7	3,519	204,145	2,776	172,571	89	4,856	1,472	363	242	
8	4,249	208,394	2,738	175,309	26	4,882	1,446	369	250	
9	3,443	211,837	2,915	178,224	40	4,922	1,457	-	244	
10	3,945	215,782	2,496	180,720	61	4983	1,483	388	266	
11	3,338	219,120	-	-	29	5,012	1,563	409	268	
12	2,903	222,023	-	-	41	5,053	1,701	385	262	
13	2,961	224,984	3,392	190,221	74	5,127	+1,600	385	276	
14	3,326	228,310	-	-	62	5,189	1,657	388	280	
15	2,998	231,308	3,380	197,194	100	5,289	1,647	387	280	
16	3,056	234,364	3,212	200,406	51	5,340	1,632	397	281	
17	3,422	237,786	3,078	-	69	5,409	-	-	-	
18	2,578	240,364	-	206,310	24	5,433	1,571	394	303	
19	1,913	242,277	2,873	209,183	46	5,479	1,626	400	292	
20	2,655	244,932	3,714	212,897	89	5,568	1,598	395	296	
21	2,632	247,564	2,990	215,887	46	5,614	1,533	388	293	
22	2,622	250,226	3,375	219,262	43	5,701	1,512	383	291	
23	2,359	252,585	3,025	222,287	52	-	1,501	395	299	
24	2,417	255,002	-	225,046	50	5,803	1,436	392	301	
25	1,958	256,960	-	227,494	43	5,846	1,398	397	283	
26	1,740	258,700	2,261	229,755	63	5,909	1,466	383	298	
27	1,670	260,370	2,725	232,480	41	5,958	1,382	377	291	
28	2,093	262,463	2,491	234,971	56	6,014	1,338	358	276	
29	1,837	264,300	-	237,871	58	6,072	1,291	360	271	
30	2,063	266,363	2,623	240,494	73	6,145	1,501	396	299	
31	1,848	268,211	2,313	242,807	43	6,188	1,159	356	252	

Ontario recorded another record-breaking day of new cases on January 2, 2021, with 3,363 new infections reported.

The Ontario government, having faced criticism for a slow rollout of vaccinations, announced on January 5 their plan to vaccinate all residents, health workers and essential caregivers in long-term care (LTC) homes by January 21.

Ontario recorded two records on January 7 – a record high in new infections at 3,519 new cases and the deadliest day of the pandemic so far with 89 deaths. In response to the continued surge, the province announced that the Provincewide Shutdown would be extended in northern Ontario for an additional 14 days (aligned with the length of Provincewide Shutdown in the south), and that elementary schools in the south will not return to in-person class until January 25.

On January 8, Ontario again recorded a new record high of new infections with 4,249 new cases. Premier Doug Ford hinted at furthering restrictions on top of the already in place Provincewide shutdown.

Due to the surge of new infections, Premier Ford issued a second declaration of emergency on January 12. Additional stay-at-home orders were announced, including the reduction of outdoor gatherings to five people, and a reduction of hours for non-essential businesses allowed to only operate between 7:00 a.m. and 8 p.m. These new restrictions begin on January 14. Also, students in Toronto, Peel, York, Hamilton, and Windsor-Essex will not return to in-person classes until February 10, 2021.

Results of an inspection "blitz" over the weekend of January 15 on big-box stores revealed a compliance rate of 70 percent with 36 of 110 stores visited at random in violation of COVID-19 protocols.

On January 15, all LTC home residents and staff in Toronto had received at least first doses of the vaccine and on January 19, all LTC home residents and staff in COVID-19 hot spots had received at least first doses of the vaccine, ahead of the January 21 goal date set by the provincial vaccine taskforce.

Due to manufacturing delays, it was also announced on January 19 that no new shipments of the Pfizer vaccine would be arriving in Ontario the following week, delaying first and second dose administration in the government's overall vaccination program.

On January 28, Peel Region's Medical Officer Lawrence Loh suggested that all online retail operating in the province be restricted from selling non-essential goods, in order to protect supply chains due to workplace outbreaks.

On January 29, 2021, the federal government announced new travel restrictions, including that individuals travelling on foreign flights would be required to take COVID-19 PCR test on arrival and quarantine in an approved hotel at their expense.

=== February ===
Date	Cases		Recoveries		Deaths		Hospitalizations			Sources
Date	New	Total	New	Total	New	Total	Total	ICU	Ventilators	Sources
1	1,969	270,180	2,132	244,939	36	6,224	1,398	397	283	
2	745	270,925	2,297	247,236	14	6,238	1,192	341	253	
3	1,172	272,097	-	248,981	-	6,305	1,066	336	254	
4	1,563	273,660	-	250,937	88	6,393	1,101	323	241	
5	1,670	275,330	-	253,170	45	6,438	1,043	325	225	
6	1,388	276,718	-	-	45	6,483	1,021	325	228	
7	1,489	278,207	1,937	256,903	22	6,505	926	335	233	
8	1,265	279,472	1,700	258,063	33	6,538	901	335	226	
9	1,022	280,494	1,388	259,991	17	6,555	909	318	223	
10	1,072	281,566	1,709	261,700	41	6,596	948	313	226	
11	945	282,511	-	136,988	18	6,614	883	299	211	
12	1,076	283,587	1,415	264,459	18	6,632	763	295	204	
13	1,300	284,887	1,434	265,893	19	6,651	786	287	203	
14	981	285,800	1,235	267,128	42	6,693	705	292	203	
15	964	-	-	-	-	-	-	-	-	
16	904	287,736	2,285	269,413	26	6,719	742	292	201	
17	847	288,583	-	270,869	10	6,729	719	298	211	
18	1,083	289,621	1,277	272,146	44	6,773	758	277	192	
19	1,150	290,771	1,255	273,401	47	6,820	689	269	190	
20	1,228	291,999	1,313	274,714	28	6,848	699	263	181	
21	1,087	293,086	1,140	275,854	13	6,861	660	277	181	
22	1,058	294,144	-	276,937	11	6,872	646	280	189	
23	975	295,119	-	277,939	12	6,884	718	283	186	
24	1,054	296,173	-	279,230	9	6,893	675	287	192	
25	1,138	297,311	1,094	280,324	23	6,916	687	283	182	
26	1,258	298,569	1,007	281,331	28	6,944	683	284	193	
27	1,185	299,754	-	282,315	16	6,960	680	276	182	
28	1,062	300,816	-	283,344	20	6,980	627	289	185	

On February 8, Premier Ford announced that the declaration of emergency would expire, but that the stay-at-home order would be extended in the majority of health regions to facilitate a gradual reinstatement of the colour-coded response framework. The order was first lifted on February 10 in Eastern Ontario's Hastings Prince Edward Public Health Unit, the Kingston, Frontenac and Lennox & Addington Health Unit, and the Renfrew County and District Health Unit. The stay-at-home order is expected to be lifted in most of Ontario on February 16, excluding Peel, Toronto, and York, and any other area where the province believes it is not yet safe to lift the order. The stay-at-home order is expected to be lifted in Peel, Toronto, and York on February 22. The response framework will also allow non-essential retail to operate with a 25 percent capacity limit if a region is under the grey "Lockdown" tier.

On February 11, the Ontario government announced March Break would be postponed for a month, to the week of April 12 and renamed Spring Break. Also on the same day, the Minister of Health admitted that the province had not met its deadline to vaccinate all long-term care homes, after mistakenly announcing that it had.

On February 26, Health Canada approved the Oxford–AstraZeneca COVID-19 vaccine for use.

=== March ===
Date	Cases		Recoveries		Deaths		Active	Hospitalizations			Sources
Date	New	Total	New	Total	New	Total	Total	Total	ICU	Ventilators	Sources
1	1,023	301,839	-	284,283	6	6,986	-	659	280	175	
2	966	302,805	-	285,262	11	6,997	10,546	677	284	189	
3	958	303,763	-	286,352	17	7,014	10,397	668	274	188	
4	994	304,757	1,072	287,424	10	7,024	10,309	687	283	182	
5	1,250	306,007	-	288,583	22	7,046	10,378	643	280	183	
6	990	306,997	1,125	289,735	6	7,052	-	620	278	181	
7	1,299	308,296	1,105	290,840	15	-	-	606	273	179	
8	1,661	309,927	994	291,834	10	7,077	-	626	282	184	
9	1,185	311,112	-	292,806	6	7,083	11,223	689	290	184	
10	1,316	312,428	-	294,018	16	7,099	-	678	281	178	
11	1,092	313,520	1,110	295,128	10	7,109	-	680	277	184	
12	1,371	314,891	-	296,252	18	7,127	11,512	676	282	189	
13	1,468	316,359	-	297,403	11	7,138	-	689	275	175	
14	1,747	318,106	-	298,570	-	7,153	-	601	282	186	
15	1,268	319,374	1,114	299,684	9	7,162	-	699	298	187	
16	1,074	320,448	7,173	300,769	11	7,173	-	761	292	194	
17	1,508	321,956	-	302,257	-	7,187	-	741	300	190	
18	1,553	303,493	-	303,493	15	7,202	-	730	304	186	
19	1,745	325,254	1,296	304,789	-	-	-	759	309	176	
20	1,829	327,083	1,261	306,050	11	7,723	-	765	302	189	
21	1,791	328,874	1,353	307,403	18	7,241	-	760	305	186	
22	1,699	330,573	-	308,578	3	7,244	-	813	298	186	
23	1,546	332,119	-	309,849	-	7,253	-	868	324	193	
24	1,571	333,690	1,531	311,380	10	7,263	-	893	333	210	
25	2,380	336,070	-	312,709	-	7,280	-	894	332	212	
26	2,169	338,239	1,675	314,384	12	7,292	-	913	359	215	
27	2,453	340,692	-	315,865	16	7,308	-	985	365	192	
28	2,448	343,140	-	317,408	19	7,327	-	917	366	217	
29	2,094	345,234	1,524	318,932	10	7,337	-	841	382	236	
30	2,336	347,570	-	320,409	14	7,351	-	1,090	387	249	
31	2,333	349,903	1,973	322,382	15	7,337	-	-	421	-	

On March 3, the first Oxford-AstraZeneca vaccines arrived in Canada, and were distributed to Ontario. The shots will be given to pharmacies in Toronto, Windsor-Essex and Kingston for early application through a pilot programme.

On March 5, Health Canada approved the Janssen COVID-19 vaccine for use. The vaccine is the only approved vaccine to require one dose.

Also on March 5, the Ontario government announced Toronto, Peel and North Bay-Parry Sound will exit stay-at-home orders in place since January. Toronto and Peel will enter lockdown (grey) zone and North Bay-Parry Sound will enter control (red).

On March 12, Peel Public Health ordered an Amazon fulfillment centre closed, after a large outbreak, forcing thousands of workers to self-isolate.

On March 15, the Ontario Hospital Association declared Ontario was in a Third Wave of the virus. Ontario's COVID-19 Science Advisory Table seconded the announcement. In response, Premier Ford told Ontarians: "we can't let our guard down for a second. We have to make sure we social distance, constantly be wearing a mask, and follow the protocols of the chief medical officer."

On March 29, per a recommendation issued by the National Advisory Committee on Immunization (NACI), Ontario and other provinces suspended use of the AstraZeneca vaccine for patients younger than 55 years old, due to concerns over a rare side effect of blood clots with low blood platelets.

=== April ===
Date	Cases		Recoveries		Deaths		Active	Hospitalizations			Sources
Date	New	Total	New	Total	New	Total	Total	Total	ICU	Ventilators	Sources
1	2,557	352,460	1,814	324,196	23	7,389	-	1,116	433	259	
2	3,089	-	-	-	-	-	-	-	-	-	
3	3,009	358,558	1,819	327,940	39	7,428	-	796	451	260	
4	3,041	-	-	-	12	-	-	-	-	-	
5	2,938	364,537	-	331,600	10	7,450	25,487	-	494	-	
6	3,065	367,602	-	333,576	8	7,458	26,568	-	510	310	
7	3,215	370,817	2,407	335,983	17	7,475	-	1,397	504	311	
8	3,295	374,112	-	338,559	19	7,494	28,059	1,417	525	331	
9	4,227	378,339	2,641	341,200	18	7,512	-	1,492	552	359	
10	3,813	382,152	2,422	343,622	19	7,531	-	1,524	585	384	
11	4,456	386,608	2,617	346,239	21	7,552	-	1,513	605	382	
12	4,401	391,009	-	348,684	15	7,567	34,758	1,646	619	-	
13	3,670	394,679	-	351,257	15	7,582	35,840	1,822	626	422	
14	4,156	398,835	7,610	354,417	-	7,610	36,808	-	642	442	
15	4,736	403,571	-	357,591	-	7,639	-	1,932	659	442	
16	4,812	408,338	-	360,742	-	7,664	-	-	701	480	
17	4,362	412,745	-	364,353	34	7,698	40,694	2,065	726	-	
18	4,250	416,995	-	367,691	18	7,716	41,588	2,107	741	506	
19	4,447	421,442	-	370,844	19	7,735	42,863	2,202	755	516	
20	3,649	424,911	-	374,213	22	7,757	42,941	2,360	773	537	
21	4,212	429,123	-	378,417	32	7,789	42,917	2,335	790	566	
22	3,682	432,805	4,597	383,014	40	7,829	-	2,350	806	588	
23	4,505	437,310	-	387,712	34	7,863	-	-	818	593	
24	4,094	441,404	-	392,044	24	7,887	-	2,277	833	600	
25	3,947	445,351	-	-	24	7,911	-	2,126	851	596	
26	3,510	448,861	-	400,340	24	7,935	-	2,271	877	605	
27	3,265	452,126	3,908	404,248	-	7,935	-	2.271	877	589	
28	3,480	455,606	4,517	408,765	24	-	-	2,281	877	571	
29	3,871	459,477	4,245	413,010	41	8,029	-	2,248	884	620	
30	3,887	463,364	4,242	417,252	21	8,050	-	2,201	883	632	

On April 1, amid rising infections exacerbated by variants of concern, Premier Ford announced a third province-wide shutdown beginning April 3. All regions were moved to a new sixth level of the response framework, "Shutdown" (white), re-imposing measures that were introduced during the first provincewide shutdown. On April 5, Peel Medical Officer of Health Lawrence Loh issued an order under Section 22 of the Health Protection and Promotion Act to close all area schools beginning April 6. Wellington-Dufferin-Guelph Public Health and Toronto Public Health made similar orders.

On April 7, in order to protect hospitals and the vaccination program, Premier Ford declared a third state of emergency and announced a second stay-at-home order that took effect at 12:01 a.m. ET on April 8, with similar measures to the first stay-at-home order, but with exceptions for certain specialized retail outlets to operate by appointment only, prohibiting essential retail stores from selling non-essential goods, and schools tentatively remaining open. Ford explained that "the situation is evolving rapidly, hour by hour. And as things change, as we learn more about these deadly new variants, as we see new problems arise, we need to adapt. We need to move quickly and decisively."

The province also announced that it would offer vaccinations to all adults within specific hotspot areas, identified by postal codes. The selection of the areas faced criticism over its methodology, including its inclusion of several sortation areas that did not actually have high rates of COVID-19 cases and/or hospitalizations, On April 11, the province recorded its single largest day of new cases to-date, at 4,456. On April 12, Premier Ford announced that all schools province-wide would close to in-person classes following Spring break.

On April 16, Premier Ford requested assistance from Alberta, including access to health care workers. The office of Alberta Premier Jason Kenney declined the request, citing its own impact by the third wave. Ford reportedly made a similar request to Saskatchewan, although the province denied that this had happened. New modelling was released with a best-case scenario of less than 4,000 cases per-day by the end of May if strong health measures (such as the current stay-at-home order) were in place and at least 100,000 vaccine doses were administered per-day, with scenarios improving if the stay-at-home order were extended to six weeks, and vaccination increased to at least 300,000 per-day.

In a news conference, Premier Ford announced that the stay-at-home order will be extended through at least May 20, and that it would also include additional capacity restrictions for retail, the closure of all outdoor recreation amenities, and a prohibition of non-essential interprovincial land travel into Ontario. Solicitor General Sylvia Jones also announced that police had been granted the right to randomly stop and question any individual they suspect are violating the stay-at-home order, including compelling them to provide their home address and reason for travel, and issuing tickets for violating a public health order if they do not comply. The policy faced criticism for resembling the past practice of carding, having a disproportionate impact on BIPOC communities, and potentially violating the Canadian Charter of Rights and Freedoms. A number of municipal police departments announced that they would not perform random stops. On April 17, Jones announced that the measure would be "refocused", only allowing police to stop and ticket people they suspect are participating in a prohibited public event or gathering

On April 18, a spokesperson stated that Ontario has had supply issues with vaccines. Backpedaling from the NACI guidance, Ontario announced that it would expand availability of the AstraZeneca vaccine to those 40 and older. David Moscrop published an op-ed in the U.S. newspaper The Washington Post calling for Ford to resign, arguing that the pandemic had exacerbated his "extraordinary capacity to alienate, divide and fail", and criticizing him for the aforementioned police measures, restricting outdoor recreation despite many COVID-19 cases being attributed to crowded indoor workplaces such as factories, and repeatedly ignoring calls to implement paid sick leave (with Ford deeming it redundant to the federal, retroactive Canadian Recovery Sickness Benefit). On April 19, Ford was absent from the legislative session,

On April 20, Peel Public Health and Toronto Public Health both issued Section 22 orders mandating that businesses be closed for 10 days (with all employees required to self-isolate for the same period) if they are linked to five or more COVID-19 infections within the past 14 days.

Premier Ford was accused by his opposition of "hiding" from the Legislature and the media since April 19, and organizing a virtual party fundraiser with tickets costing $1,000 each, amid increasing criticism of his management of the pandemic. The province issued a statement indicating that Ford was focusing primarily on procuring additional vaccine doses via international partners. On April 20, both the Ontario Liberal Party and NDP called for Ford's resignation; Ontario Liberal Party leader Steven Del Duca argued that Ford was "missing in action, hiding from the people, and hiding from accountability", and "scared to face the people and acknowledge his stunning incompetence". It was announced by the province that Ford was isolating due being a close contact of a positive case within his staff. Ford himself had tested negative.

On April 22, in his first media appearance since April 16, Premier Ford admitted that the government "made a mistake" and "went too far" with the measures they had announced on April 16. In a reversal of his prior stance, Ford also announced plans to introduce a provincial paid sick leave program, arguing that they needed to compensate for "important improvements" that were not included in the CRSB in the 2021 federal budget.

=== May ===
Date	Cases		Recoveries		Deaths		Active	Hospitalizations			Sources
Date	New	Total	New	Total	New	Total	Total	Total	ICU	Ventilators	Sources
1	3,369	466,733	3,964	421,216	29	8,079	-	2,152	883	637	
2	3,732	470,465	3,947	425,163	23	8,102	-	1,961	895	615	
3	3,436	473,901	3,623	428,786	16	8,118	-	1,925	889	611	
4	2,791	476,692	3,323	432,109	25	8,143	-	2,167	886	609	
5	2,941	-	-	-	44	8,187	-	2,075	882	578	
6	3,424	483,057	-	440,467	26	8,213	-	-	877 -		
7	3,166	486,223	-	486,223	23	8,236	-	1,924	853	611	
8	2,864	489,087	3,596	447,938	25	8,261	-	1,832	851	588	
9	3,216	492,303	3,653	451,591	47	8,308	-	1,640	848	580	
10	2,716	495,019	3,110	454,701	19	8,327	-	1,632	828	547	
11	2,073	497,092	2,898	457,599	15	8,342	-	1,782	802	568	
12	2,320	499,412	-	461,076	32	8,374	-	-	776	-	
13	2,759	502,171	-	464,531	31	8,405	29,235	1,632	776	-	
14	2,362	504,533	3,502	468,033	26	8,431	-	1,582	777	560	
15	2,584	507,117	-	471,096	24	8,455	27,566	1,546	785	-	
16	2,199	509,316	-	474,175	30	8,485	26,656	1,292	785	-	
17	2,170	511,486	-	477,128	4	8,489	25,869	-	-	-	
18	1,616	513,102	-	479,630	17	8,506	24,966	-	-	-	
19	1,588	514,690	-	-	19	8,525	-	1,401	745	483	
20	2,400	517,090	-	485,512	27	8,552	23,026	1,320	721	-	
21	1,890	518,980	-	488,201	27	8,579	22,200	1,265	715	-	
22	1,794	520,774	-	-	20	8,599	-	1,207	706	504	
23	1,691	522,465	-	-	15	8,614	-	1,041	698	-	
24	1,446	-	-	-	-	-	-	-	-	-	
25	1,039	524,590	-	-	41	8,655	-	1,025	662	498	
26	1,095	526,045	2,371	499,640	23	8,678	-	1,073	672	469	
27	1,135	527,180	2,302	501,942	19	8,697	-	1072	650	452	
28	1,273	528,453	2,362	504,304	14	8,711	-	1,023	645	458	
29	1,057	529,510	-	506,361	15	8,726	14,423	934	626	-	
30	1,033	530,543	-	508,428	18	8,744	13,371	749	614	-	
31	916	531,459	1,707	510,135	13	8,757	-	731	617	382	

Ontario paused first doses of AstraZeneca vaccine on May 11, citing eight cases of Vaccine-Induced Immune Thrombotic Thrombocytopenia in the province. A day later, officials confirmed that another 254,500 doses were scheduled to be delivered the next week. Officials suggested they would likely still be used for second doses.

As of May 11, one Hamilton apartment building was reported to have an outbreak of 107 cases of COVID-19.

=== June ===
Date	Cases		Recoveries		Deaths		Active	Hospitalizations			Sources
Date	New	Total	New	Total	New	Total	Total	Total	ICU	Ventilators	Sources
1	699	532,158	1,568	511,703	9	8,766	-	804	583	335	
2	733	532,891	1,733	513,436	25	8,791	-	708	576	399	
3	870	533,761	1,563	514,999	10	8,801	-	729	546	317	
4	914	-	1,397	516,396	19	8,820	-	687	522	357	
5	744	-	-	-	24	8,844	-	625	516	362	
6	663	-	-	-	10	8,854	-	545	510	344	
7	525	536,607	-	519,801	-	8,869	-	547	-	497	
8	469	537,076	-	-	18	-	-	621	481	-	
9	411	-	-	-	33	-	-	571	466	-	
10	590	-	-	-	11	-	-	516	450	-	
11	574	538,651	-	523,532	-	8,935	-	489	440	-	
12	502	539,153	830	524,362	15	8,950	-	447	422	277	
13	530	539,683	763	525,125	24	8,957	-	373	426	273	
14	447	540,130	670	525,795	4	8,961	-	384	409	268	
15	296	540,426	645	526,440	13	8,974	-	433	382	215	
16	350	540,810	722	527,162	12	8,968	-	438	377	242	
17	370	541,180	635	541,180	7	8,993	-	397	362	232	
18	345	541,525	628	528,421	1	8,994	-	378	352	293	
19	355	541,880	-	529,002	13	9,007	-	336	335	221	
20	318	542,198	-	529,506	12	9,019	-	266	333	208	
21	270	542,469	-	-	3	9,022	-	261	323	-	
22	296	542,764	-	530,434	60	9,082	-	334	314	202	
23	255	543,019	-	-	11	9,093	-	816	305	190	
24	296	543,315	-	-	-	-	-	-	299	-	
25	256	543,571	-	531,571	2	9,101	2,899	275	284	173	
26	346	-	-	532,074	13	9,114	-	273	-	-	
27	287	-	379	-	-	9,126	2,625	-	289	230	
28	210	544,414	326	532,779	3	9,129	-	218	287	191	
29	299	544,713	371	533,150	25	9,154	-	257	276	185	
30	184	-	322	533,472	14	9,168	-	257	276	185	

On June 2, Premier Ford announced that in-person classes at schools will remain suspended through the end of the school year, citing concerns over variants. Ford also stated that the province was also considering moving up the date for Step 1.

On June 11, Ontario entered Step 1 of the Roadmap To Reopen plan that was originally scheduled for June 14.

On June 30, Ontario entered Step 2 of the Roadmap To Reopen plan that was originally scheduled for July 2.

=== July ===
Date	Cases		Recoveries		Deaths		Active	Hospitalizations			Sources
Date	New	Total	New	Total	New	Total	Total	Total	ICU	Ventilators	Sources
1	284	-	257	-	-	-	-	-	-	-	
2	200	545,381	281	534,010	28	9,196	2,175	179	252	160	
3	209	545,590	262	534,272	9	9,205	-	-	243	165	
4	213	545,803	286	534,558	9	9,214	-	-	235	159	
5	170	545,973	233	-	1	9,215	-	-	-	-	
6	244	546,217	319	535,110	9	9,224	1,883	202	226	161	
7	194	546,411	236	535,346	0	9,224	1,841	201	220	155	
8	210	546,621	231	535,577	4	9,228	1,841	194	215	145	
9	183	546,804	233	535,810	9	9,237	1,757	189	202	143	
10	179	546,983	218	536,028	8	9,245	1,710	-	197	134	
11	166	547,149	278	536,306	6	9,251	1,592	130	202	132	
12	114	547,263	96	535,810	0	9,251	1,610	142	204	123	
13	146	547,409	201	536,603	7	9,258	1,548	173	192	123	
14	153	547,562	216	536,819	7	9,265	1,478	174	180	116	
15	143	547,705	168	536,987	10	9,275	1,443	165	168	114	
16	159	547,864	189	537,176	10	9,285	1,403	159	158	112	
17	176	548,040	-	537,379	3	9,288	-	-	149	109	
18	177	548,217	166	537,545	6	9,294	1,378	105	150	99	
19	130	548,347	153	537,698	0	9,294	1,355	115	151	94	
20	127	548,474	126	537,824	2	9,296	-	145	149	98	
21	135	548,609	151	537,975	4	9,300	1,335	139	145	70	
22	185	548,794	149	538,124	7	9,307	1,363	140	141	84	
23	192	548,986	147	538,271	1	9,308	1,407	137	136	84	
24	170	549,156	150	538,421	3	9,311	-	-	132	86	
25	172	549,328	149	538,565	2	9,313	1,450	88	127	81	
26	119	549,447	137	538,702	3	9,316	1,429	96	131	95	
27	129	549,576	158	538,860	5	9,321	1,392	125	127	91	
28	158	549,734	171	549,734	4	9,325	1,378	117	122	85	
29	218	549,952	169	539,200	3	9,328	1,424	105	121	86	
30	226	550,178	148	539,348	11	9,339	-	-	117	77	
31	258	550,436	137	539,485	6	9,345	-	-	112	83	

On July 16, Ontario entered Step 3 of the Roadmap To Reopen plan that was originally scheduled for July 21.

=== August ===
Date	Cases		Recoveries		Deaths		Active	Hospitalizations			Sources
Date	New	Total	New	Total	New	Total	Total	Total	ICU	Ventilators	Sources
1	218	550,654	155	539,680	2	9,347	1,667	78	110	79	
2	168	-	129	-	1	9,348	-	-	-	-	
3	164	550,986	151	539,920	1	9,349	1,717	71	106	77	
4	139	551,125	155	540,075	11	9,360	1,690	112	108	78	
5	213	551,338	183	540,258	14	9,374	1,706	113	110	78	
6	340	551,678	149	540,407	18	9,392	1,879	114	110	80	
7	378	552,056	191	540,598	9	9,401	2,057	138	111	82	
8	423	552,479	232	540,830	6	9,407	-	-	116	76	
9	325	552,804	192	541,022	-	9,407	2,375	94	113	83	
10	321	553,125	200	541,222	2	9,409	-	100	109	72	
11	324	553,449	204	541,426	3	9,412	2,611	108	108	70	
12	513	553,962	256	541,682	0	9,412	2,868	116	113	76	
13	510	554,472	264	541,946	4	9,416	3,110	123	111	72	
14	578	555,050	260	542,206	2	9,418	-	136	111	72	
15	511	555,561	270	542,476	0	9,418	3,667	98	116	71	
16	526	556,087	321	542,797	0	9,418	3,872	108	119	92	
17	348	556,435	280	543,077	10	9,428	3,930	163	127	98	
18	485	556,920	345	543,422	3	9,431	4,067	174	-	-	
19	531	557,451	338	543,760	17	9,448	4,243	176	-	-	
20	650	558,101	444	544,204	-	-	-	197	135	104	
21	689	558,790	475	544,679	1	9,451	-	-	130	78	
22	722	559,512	391	545,070	2	9,453	-	-	141	79	>
23	639	560,151	502	545,572	-	-	5,126	204	151	121	
24	486	560,637	541	560,637	18	9,471	-	295	156	125	
25	660	561,297	572	546,685	1	9,472	-	283	161	130	
26	678	561,975	513	547,198	0	9,472	-	302	165	134	
27	781	562,756	625	547,823	17	9,489	5,444	306	158	128	
28	835	563,591	575	548,398	7	9,496	-	-	162	87	
29	740	564,331	561	548,959	2	9,498	-	-	158	98	
30	694	565,025	540	549,499	0	9,498	6,028	226	160	93	
31	525	565,550	680	550,179	5	9,503	5,868	336	160	131	

On August 17, the Ontario government had announced that further reopening of Ontario past Step 3 of the Roadmap To Reopen plan had been paused indefinitely, following the start of Ontario's fourth wave, the increasing amount of daily cases, and also citing the increasing spread of the Delta Variant. By late August, local public health advice has shifted focus from “staying safe” to “limiting contact” because of the growing fourth infection wave in the province.

=== September ===
Date	Cases		Recoveries		Deaths		Active	Hospitalizations			Sources
Date	New	Total	New	Total	New	Total	Total	Total	ICU	Ventilators	Sources
1	656	566,206	650	550,829	13	9,516	5,861	339	163	135	
2	865	567,071	681	551,510	14	9,530	6,031	320	162	137	
3	807	567,878	738	552,248	6	9,536	6,094	326	169	144	
4	944	568,822	728	552,976	9	9,545	-	320	172	97	
5	811	569,633	573	553,549	3	9,548	6,536	266	179	155	
6	581	-	716	-	2	-	6,399	-	-	-	
7	564	570,778	688	570,778	3	9,553	6,272	295	192	165	
8	554	571,332	770	555,723	16	9,569	6,040	375	194	167	
9	798	572,130	772	556,495	3	9,579	6,056	365	185	165	
10	848	572,978	770	557,265	5	9,590	6,123	361	177	153	
11	857	573,835	756	558,021	15	9,605	-	183	180	114	
12	784	574,619	738	558,759	6	9,611	6,249	289	184	107	
13	600	575,219	627	559,386	4	9,617	6,216	289	189	163	
14	577	575,796	683	560,069	6	9,624	-	363	192	119	
15	593	576,389	755	560,824	4	9,629	5,936	346	188	165	
16	864	577,253	668	561,492	3	9,632	6,129	348	191	167	
17	795	578,048	680	562,172	5	9,637	-	336	194	-	
18	821	578,869	655	562,827	10	9,647	-	329	185	126	
19	715	579,584	708	563,535	6	9,653	6,396	245	182	161	
20	610	580,194	628	564,163	2	9,655	6,376	233	177	156	
21	574	580,768	764	564,927	8	9,663	6,178	330	179	154	
22	463	581,231	783	565,710	7	9,670	5,851	299	187	162	
23	677	581,908	676	566,386	7	9,677	5,845	307	193	168	
24	727	582,635	814	567,200	11	9,688	5,747	308	193	167	
25	640	583,275	794	567,994	10	9,698	-	323	178	128	
26	653	583,928	639	568,633	6	9,704	-	198	177	127	
27	613	584,541	578	569,211	0	9,704	5,626	186	184	157	
28	466	570,030	819	585,007	11	9,715	5,262	315	180	152	
29	495	585,502	760	570,790	8	9,723	4,989	291	172	149	
30	647	-	-	-	-	-	-	-	-	-	

On September 1, the Ontario government had announced that a Vaccine Certification System would begin rolling out in Ontario province-wide in two phases in order to access non-essential businesses in Ontario, such as gyms, indoor restaurants, movie theatres, and concert halls. The first phase being that showing proof of a COVID-19 vaccination using official Ontario printed receipts would be mandatory province wide beginning as of September 22. The second phase being using a COVID-19 Vaccine Passport System in Ontario, which would show proof of a COVID-19 vaccination using QR codes either printed on paper, or stored digitally using a smartphone, would be mandatory province wide beginning as of October 22. Ontario Government Issued Photo ID must also be presented in both phases.

=== October ===
Date	Cases		Recoveries		Deaths		Active	Hospitalizations			Sources
Date	New	Total	New	Total	New	Total	Total	Total	ICU	Ventilators	Sources
1	668	586,817	1,315	572,105	20	9,743	4,969	278	163	141	
2	704	587,521	645	572,750	7	9,750	-	274	162	110	
3	580	588,101	4,983	573,366	2	9,752	4,983	144	163	107	
4	511	588,612	-	573,854	2	9,754	5,004	146	159	104	
5	429	589,041	-	574,550	4	9,757	4,734	277	155	101	
6	476	589,517	617	575,167	14	9,771	4,579	280	156	132	
7	587	590,104	586	575,753	5	9,776	4,575	279	149	125	
8	573	590,677	621	576,374	10	9,786	4,517	271	154	129	
9	654	591,331	577	576,951	2	9,788	-	258	153	194	
10	535	591,866	539	577,490	2	9,790	-	-	153	100	
11	458	-	551	-	2	9,792	4,491	165	155	125	
12	390	592,714	512	578,553	0	9,792	4,369	155	149	121	
13	306	593,020	527	579,080	12	9,804	4,136	242	153	124	
14	417	593,437	528	579,608	3	9,807	4,022	254	158	129	
15	496	593,933	542	580,150	2	9,809	3,974	265	163	134	
16	486	594,419	517	580,667	5	9,814	-	242	164	103	
17	443	594,862	484	581,151	-1	9,813	3,898	155	164	93	
18	373	595,235	423	581,574	2	9,815	3,846	145	168	138	
19	328	595,563	498	582,072	4	9,819	3,672	260	159	130	
20	304	595,867	537	582,609	4	9,823	3,435	258	159	132	
21	413	596,280	488	583,097	4	9,827	3,356	274	161	135	
22	492	596,772	415	583,512	12	9,839	3,421	261	149	121	
23	373	597,145	419	583,931	6	9,845	-	-	136	96	
24	370	597,515	480	584,411	1	9,846	-	-	137	97	
25	326	597,841	369	584,780	0	9,846	3,215	163	138	109	
26	269	598,110	427	585,207	6	9,852	3,051	233	138	107	
27	321	598,431	384	585,591	10	9,862	2,978	215	134	105	
28	409	598,840	-	585,957	3	9,865	3,018	197	132	104	
29	419	599,259	-	586,356	0	9,865	3,038	211	130	100	
30	356	599,615	340	586,696	4	9,869	-	213	132	286	
31	340	599,955	-	587,069	2	9,871	3,015	104	133	108	

On October 22, the Ontario government had announced a timeline roadmap plan to lift restrictions in Ontario. As of October 25, capacity limit restrictions are lifted in settings where showing proof of vaccination is required, such as Restaurants, Bars, Gyms, Casinos, Bingo Halls, Other Indoor Meeting and Event Spaces, and Gaming Establishments.

The Ontario government will also allow other settings to lift their capacity limits, if the setting chooses to require showing proof of vaccination, such as Barber Shops, Salons, Museums, Galleries, Aquariums, Zoos, Science Centers, Landmarks, Historic Sites, Botanical Gardens, Amusement Parks, Fairs, Exhibitions, Festivals, Indoor Tour and Guide Services, Boat Tours, Indoor Areas of Marinas and Boating Clubs, Indoor Clubhouses at Outdoor Recreational Amenities, Open House Events provided by Real Estate Agencies, and Indoor Areas of Photography Studios and Services.

=== November ===
Date	Cases		Recoveries		Deaths		Hospitalizations			Sources
Date	New	Total	New	Total	New	Total	Total	ICU	Ventilators	Sources
1	422	600,377	275	587,344	3	9,874	137	133	84	
2	331	600,708	383	587,727	7	9,881	230	185	45	
3	378	601,086	380	588,107	5	9,886	237	137	114	
4	438	601,524	337	588,444	7	9,891	225	129	109	
5	563	602,087	352	588,796	5	9,896	225	129	109	
6	508	602,595	370	589,166	-3	9,896	203	130	-	
7	636	603,231	-	589,533	2	9,898	93	126	106	
8	480	603,711	-	-	2	9,990	105	127	107	
9	441	604,152	456	590,227	3	9,903	244	134	115	
10	454	604,606	414	590,641	9	9,912	243	136	116	
11	642	605,248	-	591,063	4	9,916	243	136	116	
12	598	605,846	462	591,525	5	9,921	207	130	107	
13	661	606,507	469	591,994	6	9,927	263	131	78	
14	666	607,173	467	592,461	7	9,934	126	133	107	
15	552	607,725	342	592,803	3	9,937	138	141	107	
16	481	608,206	651	593,454	1	9,938	301	139	112	
17	512	608,718	573	594,027	12	9,950	274	133	108	
18	711	609,429	575	594,602	5	9,955	278	129	105	
19	793	610,222	567	595,169	4	9,959	269	128	107	
20	728	610,950	-	-	5	9,964	283	-	-	
21	741	611,691	-	596,259	3	9,967	107	135	113	
22	627	612,318	494	596,753	1	9,968	136	133	111	
23	613	612,931	717	597,470	6	9,974	282	134	111	
24	591	613,522	664	598,134	7	9,981	289	137	118	
25	748	614,270	599	598,733	4	9,985	259	137	117	
26	927	615,197	666	599,399	6	9,991	268	140	121	
27	854	616,051	580	599,979	2	9,993	254	134	87	
28	964	617,015	-	600,537	1	9,994	122	135	-	
29	788	617,803	453	600,990	3	9,997	145	148	131	
30	678	618,490	560	601,550	3	10,000	266	153	137	

On November 28, Ontario reported 2 cases of the new SARS-CoV-2 Omicron variant, confirming the arrival of the variant into Canada. Two Ottawa residents with recent travel history to Nigeria had tested positive for the variant, which was first detected in South Africa.

On November 30, Ontario's death toll reached the 10,000 mark.

=== December ===
Date	Cases		Recoveries		Deaths		Hospitalizations			Sources
Date	New	Total	New	Total	New	Total	Total	ICU	Ventilators	Sources
1	780	619,270	965	602,515	5	10,005	296	155	137	
2	959	620,229	770	603,285	7	10,012	291	155	139	
3	1,031	621,260	742	604,027	4	10,016	286	146	127	
4	1,053	622,313	722	604,749	8	10,024	284	160	98	
5	1,184	623,497	-	605,358	0	10,024	140	164	146	
6	887	624,384	-	605,918	3	10,027	137	168	149	
7	928	625,312	879	606,797	7	10,036	340	165	144	
8	1,009	626,321	1,129	607,926	8	10,044	333	155	135	
9	1,290	627,611	970	608,896	10	10,054	309	155	135	
10	1,453	629,064	910	609,806	11	10,064	309	151	130	
11	1,607	630,671	786	610,592	5	10,024	323	146	94	
12	1,476	632,147	-	611,266	8	10,078	222	158	138	
13	1,536	633,683	800	612,066	1	10,079	253	161	143	
14	1,429	635,112	930	612,996	5	10,084	385	162	143	
15	1,808	636,920	1,165	614,161	9	10,093	357	154	136	
16	2,421	639,341	1,013	615,174	9	10,102	328	165	147	
17	3,124	642,465	1,392	616,566	5	10,105	358	157	139	
18	3,301	645,766	1,207	617,773	4	10,111	382	154	99	
19	4,177	649,943	-	618,983	2	10,113	283	159	146	
20	3,874	653,727	1,040	620,023	0	10,113	284	164	152	
21	3,453	657,180	1,332	621,355	10	10,123	412	165	105	
22	4,383	661,563	1,787	623,142	10	10,133	420	168	108	
23	5,790	667,353	1,659	624,801	7	10,140	440	169	106	
24	9,571	676,924	1,997	626,798	6	10,146	508	164	102	
25	10,412	-	1,872	-	4	-	510	165	-	
26	9,826	697,162	1,796	630,466	7	-	373	168	-	
27	9,418	706,580	1,899	632,365	10	10,161	480	176	-	
28	8,825	715,405	2,481	634,846	7	10,168	491	187	-	
29	10,436	725,841	3,832	638,678	3	10,171	726	190	-	
30	13,807	739,648	4,037	642,715	8	10,179	965	200	104	
31	16,713	756,361	4,630	647,345	15	10,194	1,144	205	104	

On December 2, one new case of the Omicron variant was reported in the Durham Region.

On December 15, Premier Doug Ford announced that the province will re-enter a version of step 3 called step 3.9 of its 3 step reopening plan effective Saturday December 18 including the return of capacity limits in high risk settings. On December 17, Premier Doug Ford announced that the province will move into step 3.5 including the lowering of capacity limits in more non essential businesses and the lowering the gathering sizes to 10 indoors and 25 outdoors.

On December 23, Ontario broke its single-day record for new daily cases for two consecutive days with 5790 new cases, followed by 9571 new cases.
