= Willoughby Mason Willoughby =

Willoughby Mason Willoughby (1875 in Plymouth - 1936 in London) was an English physician who served as Medical Officer of Health for the city of London.

== Early life and education ==
Willoughby's education began at Plymouth College, continuing at University College Bristol, obtaining there a scholarship to Caius College, Cambridge, where in 1897 he graduated B.A. with honours in the Natural Sciences Tripos. Having chosen medicine as a career, he went to St. Bartholomew's Hospital, obtaining the M.B.and B.Ch. degrees in 1900, and proceeding M.D. in 1904, his thesis being entitled " The Site of Pain in Visceral Disease from an Embryological Standpoint." He also took the Cambridge D.P.H.

== Career ==
Willoughby began his career in general practice in South Wales, going on to join the Port of London Sanitary Authority in 1901, becoming Medical Officer in charge of the Port Isolation Hospital. He was appointed Medical Officer of Health for the Port of London in 1916, and Medical Officer of Health for the City of London in 1928. He was an early proponent of cremation, as he believed cemeteries had become overcrowded and a risk to health.

== Personal life and family ==
Willoughby married Edith Croft Daniel in 1901. They had one son, who was an assistant medical officer in the Port of London. His brother, Dr. George Willoughby was the medical officer of health for Eastbourne

== Death ==
Mason died on 4 November 1936, in St. Bartholomew's Hospital
