= Sheela Basrur =

Canadian physician (1956–2008)

Sheela Basrur OOnt
- Born: October 17, 1956; Toronto, Ontario, Canada
- Died: June 2, 2008 (aged 51); Kitchener, Ontario, Canada
- Education: University of Western Ontario, University of Toronto
- Known for: Toronto Medical Officer of Health
- Scientific career
- Fields: Community health, epidemiology
- Workplaces: Government of Ontario, City of Toronto

Sheela Basrur, OOnt (October 17, 1956 – June 2, 2008) was a Canadian physician and Ontario Chief Medical Officer of Health and Assistant Deputy Minister of Public Health. She resigned from these positions late in 2006 to undergo treatment for cancer.

== Life and training ==
Basrur was born in Toronto, Ontario, in 1956 to Indian immigrants. Her mother, Parvathi Basrur, was a professor of veterinary genetics and her father, Vasanth Basrur, was a radiation oncologist. She grew up in Guelph, where there were very few visible minorities at the time. After obtaining a Bachelor of Science from the University of Western Ontario in 1979, she received her doctor of medicine from the University of Toronto in 1982, after which Basrur worked as a general practitioner in Guelph for one year. She then spent a year in India and Nepal, where she became interested in public health. Upon returning to Canada, she obtained a Master of Health Science degree in 1987, specializing in community health and epidemiology, again from the University of Toronto. She then completed a post-graduate residency, becoming a specialist in community medicine, as well as an assistant professor in the Department of Public Health Sciences at the University of Toronto.

Basrur lived in Scarborough, but moved to Kitchener, where she underwent treatment for leiomyosarcoma, from which she eventually died on June 2, 2008.

== Public career ==
Basrur became the Medical Officer of Health for the East York Health Unit until East York was merged into the city of Toronto in 1998, when she became the first Medical Officer of Health for the new amalgamated city. She was widely hailed for her work during the 2003 Severe acute respiratory syndrome (SARS) outbreak in Toronto, appearing in numerous television interviews on international networks, such as CNN. Basrur wrote a journal article with Barbara Yaffe and Bonnie Henry in the 2004 Canadian Journal of Public Health entitled "SARS: A Local Public Health Perspective". She said upon the release of the NACSARS report that

We have to move away from pencil, paper and flip charts.

Basrur's other accomplishments included Canada's first city program that required restaurants to post health inspection results in their windows, post-9/11 bioterrorism preparation plans, and a citywide ban on cigarette smoking in 2004.

In 2004 she was appointed Chief Medical Officer of Health and Assistant Deputy Minister of Public Health in the Ontario Ministry of Health and Long-Term Care. She remained in this position until her resignation on December 6, 2006, in order to undergo treatment for her cancer.

== Honours ==
Basrur received a number of honours throughout her career. In 2007 she was awarded life membership in the Ontario Public Health Association (OPHA), as well as an honorary doctor of laws degree from York University. A nursing oncology fellowship was established in Basrur's name by the Registered Nurses' Foundation of Ontario, and the OPHA created an award for social justice in her honour. A major Public celebration of the life and contributions of Dr.Sheela Basrur was held on Oct 17th 2008 4:00-5:30pm at Convocation Hall, University of Toronto, where the accomplishments of the late Dr. Basrur's life were celebrated by friends, family, the public and leaders from the City of Toronto, the Province of Ontario and the Government of Canada.

Upon the formation of the Ontario Agency for Health Protection and Promotion on March 8, 2008, it was announced that the headquarters would be known as the Sheela Basrur Centre. The following month, on April 10, Basrur was inducted into the Order of Ontario for her public service; Basrur's induction ceremony took place outside the normal award schedule, owing to her ongoing battle with leiomyosarcoma.

Preceded by Medical Officers of Health - for East York, Etobicoke, North York, Scarborough, Toronto, York (pre-amalgamation)	Medical Officer of Health - City of Toronto; 1998–2005	Succeeded by Dr. Barbara Yaffe (interim); Dr. David McKeown
Preceded by Colin D'Cunha	Ontario Ministry of Health and Long-Term Care - Chief Medical Officer of Health, Assistant Deputy Minister, Public Health Division; 2005–2006	Succeeded by Dr. George Pasut
