= Dalla Lana School of Public Health =

School of public health at the University of Toronto

Coordinates: 43.659113°N 79.392796°W

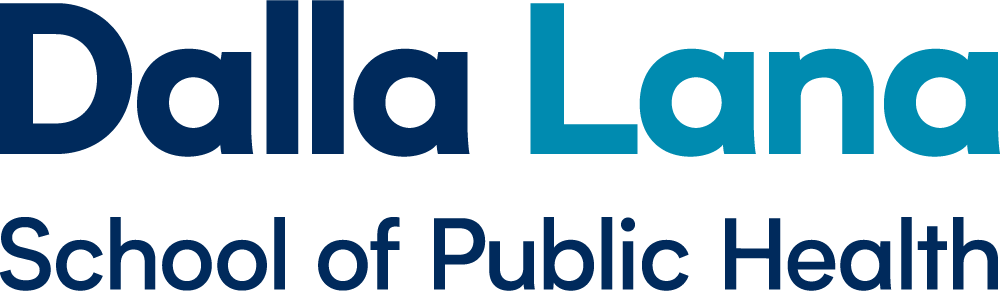
- Type: Public
- Established: 1927 (re-established 2008; 18 years ago)
- Parent institution: University of Toronto
- Dean: Adalsteinn Brown
- Total staff: 158
- Postgraduates: 745
- Doctoral students: 319
- Location: Toronto, Ontario, Canada
- Named for: Paul Dalla Lana
- Website: dlsph.utoronto.ca

The Dalla Lana School of Public Health (DLSPH) is the school of public health at the University of Toronto, based on its St. George campus in downtown Toronto, Ontario, Canada. It was founded in 1927, and was home for 50 years to Connaught Laboratories, a manufacturer of vaccines, insulin, and many other pharmaceutical products. Having grown to be the largest cluster of public health scholars in Canada, the school was revitalized in 2008 with the support of a major gift from the Dalla Lana family.

== Early history ==
Hygiene, particularly sanitation, was a component of the teaching programs at the early private medical schools in Toronto starting as early as 1871. One of the earliest recorded hygiene instructors was William Coverton, who taught sanitary sciences in the Trinity University medical school from 1878 to 1891. At the competing Toronto School of Medicine in the mid-1880s, William Oldright, a physician and sanitarian who served as the first chair of the Ontario Provincial Board of Health, lectured in the sanitary sciences. Following the merger of the Toronto School of Medicine with the University of Toronto, Oldright continued to teach sanitation sciences in the Faculty of Medicine and chair the Department of Hygiene until his retirement in 1910. During his tenure, Oldright established a museum of hygiene in the basement of the medical building that showcased technological developments ranging from sewage management to ventilation, water testing and personal protective equipment for workers.

Upon Oldright's retirement, John Amyot, a bacteriologist affiliated with the provincial health laboratory, was appointed chair of the Department of Hygiene and Sanitary Science in Faculty of Medicine. Like Oldright, Amyot was interested in sewage treatment and water treatment as means of controlling diseases such as typhoid. From his experience as a physician, Amyot was also a strong proponent of preventive medicine. Together with then-Medical Officer of Health JWS McCullough and Professor of Biology Robert Ramsay Wright, Amyot championed the creation of a Diploma in Public Health (DPH), emphasizing sanitation but including training in bacteriology and preventive medicine. The program was first offered in 1912, and its first graduate, Robert Defries, completed training in 1913 under Amyot's supervision.

== John FitzGerald and the Antitoxin Laboratory ==
John G. FitzGerald completed his medical training at the University of Toronto in 1903. After spending time as a ship's physician, FitzGerald studied psychiatry in Buffalo, New York and neurology at Johns Hopkins University and bacteriology at Harvard University with brief stints abroad at the Pasteur Institute and the University of Freiburg. Upon his return to North America in 1911, FitzGerald accepted an appointment as associate professor of bacteriology at the University of California Berkeley – a position he held until Amyot recruited him to return to Toronto in 1913 as the first full-time faculty member of the Department of Hygiene. FitzGerald's experience in Europe made him aware of the success of antitoxins and vaccines as a means of reducing mortality. Needing laboratory space when he arrived in Toronto, FitzGerald set up to work in the Provincial Board of Health laboratory at 4 Queen's Park where he began preparing rabies vaccine using the method of Louis Pasteur, successfully eliminating its costly, daily purchase from suppliers in New York.

Capitalizing on the success of his rabies venture, FitzGerald set out to address the much larger problem of diphtheria. Despite Paul Ehrlich's demonstration of the effectiveness of diphtheria antitoxin in the 1890s, the treatment remained slowly adopted on wider scale and diphtheria deaths in children continued to rise well into early decades of the 1900s. In 1914, Fitzgerald approached the university's Board of Governors proposing a plan to create a "Serum Institute" whose purpose was to manufacture and sell diphtheria and other antitoxins through the Department of Hygiene, providing them to Provincial Health Departments across Canada for distribution. FitzGerald's proposal also included the development of a research program focused on the prevention or treatment of a range of other infectious diseases, and the close integration of commercial and research activities with the department's teaching programs. FitzGerald's idea won approval from the Board of Governors and, with the support of Amyot, he began in 1914 to develop space in the medical building made available by the decommissioning of Oldright's museum. As diphtheria antibodies needed to be raised in horses, stabling provisions were also required. Amyot's assistant, William Fenton, proposed their accommodation in a small stable behind his home at 145 Barton Avenue near the university. Despite the military service of FitzGerald and Amyot, the activities of the Antitoxin Laboratory continued during the First World War although its focus had shifted to the production of tetanus vaccine in support of the overseas war effort. In 1915, Defries was appointed to lead the tetanus program which he did until called away by military obligations in 1916. Like diphtheria, tetanus vaccine manufacture also used horses to raise polyclonal antibodies. The rapid expansion of the antitoxin program quickly overwhelmed the capacity of Fenton's barn and the generously donated stables of the decommissioned Ontario Veterinary College buildings on Temperance Street, presenting an urgent space need.

== Connaught Laboratories ==
In 1915, the chair of the Ontario chapter of the Red Cross, Colonel Albert Gooderham, was tapped by the university to help address the issue of space. Gooderham, the grandson of William Gooderham and heir to a portion of the Gooderham & Worts Distillery fortune purchased and donated a 58-acre farm several miles north of Toronto to be used to house laboratory animals. Gooderham requested the antitoxin laboratories and farm facility be renamed the Connaught Antitoxin Laboratories and University Farm, in honour of the Governor General of Canada at the time, Prince Arthur, Duke of Connaught and Strathearn. The chair of the Rockefeller Foundation, Simon Flexner, attended the opening ceremony in 1917, giving the evening address in Convocation Hall. It has been speculated that Flexner's impression of the importance of FitzGerald and his work may have contributed to Rockefeller's subsequent support of the School. Gooderham later provided additional monies to construct laboratory facilities at the farm. Although physically separated from the university, the farm and co-located laboratory remained controlled by the university with the intent that the Connaught facility would support its commercial operation and research activities through cost-recovery. Ultimately in 1923, the Antitoxin Laboratory in the Department of Hygiene also changed its name to Connaught Laboratories.

In the years immediately after the conclusion of the First World War, the activities of the laboratories again expanded, becoming the first facility in the world to mass-produce the newly discovered anti-diabetic drug, insulin under the supervision of Defries and Charles Best. Given the high demand and the production needs (and following the recent construction of the Hart House student center), additional space was obtained in the newly vacated campus YMCA building. In 1923, the Antitoxin Laboratory facilities in the Department of Hygiene together with the farm facilities were consolidated under the name, Connaught Laboratories.

== The School of Hygiene ==
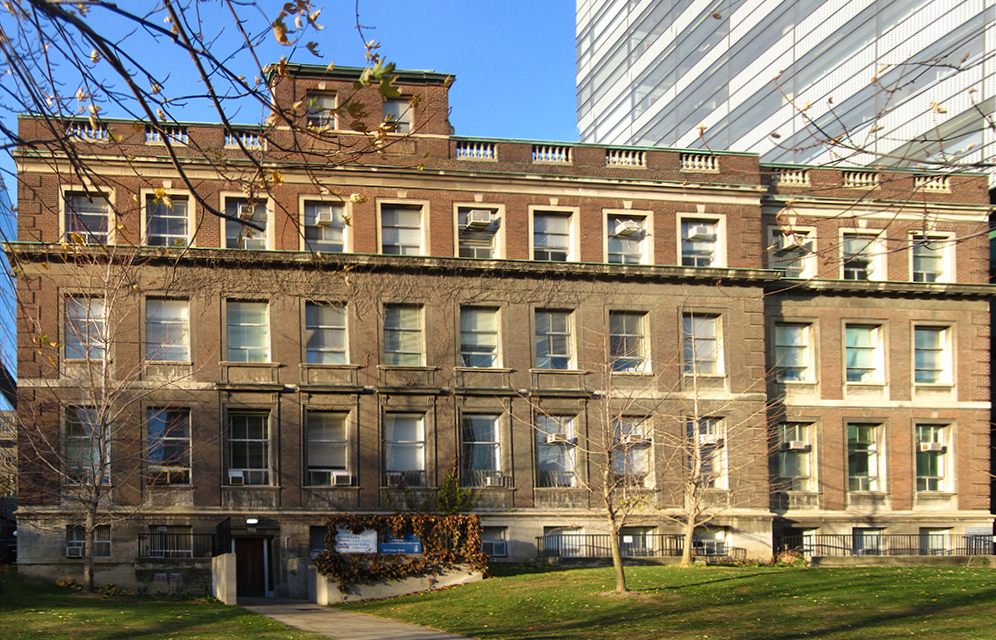
South-facing elevation of FitzGerald Building at the University of Toronto. The building was constructed in 1927 with financial support from the Rockefeller Foundation to house the School of Hygiene. This entrance originally served the Connaught facilities that occupied the two basement levels.

FitzGerald succeeded Amyot as chair of the department after the retirement of the latter in 1919, and the department's name was changed to Department of Hygiene and Preventive Medicine. At the same time, FitzGerald expanded the DPH curriculum beyond microbiology and sanitation to include preventive medicine, epidemiology, industrial hygiene and nutrition.

Just as the laboratories were thriving, so the growing needs of the Department of Hygiene required larger facilities for teaching and research. Aware of the support that the Rockefeller Foundation had provided to establish schools of public health at Harvard, Johns Hopkins and London, FitzGerald approached Rockefeller in 1922 with a proposal to establish a School of Hygiene at the University of Toronto. The application was approved and construction begun in 1923 on a new building that would bring together the various public health activities on campus. In addition to the downtown facilities of Connaught Laboratories, the new school was to incorporate the existing Departments of Hygiene and Preventive Medicine, and Public Health Nursing along with the Division of Industrial Hygiene. Supported was also given to create the new Departments of Epidemiology and Biometrics, and Physiological Hygiene. The new building opened in 1927 with FitzGerald as the director – a position he held until his death in 1940.

== Modern history ==
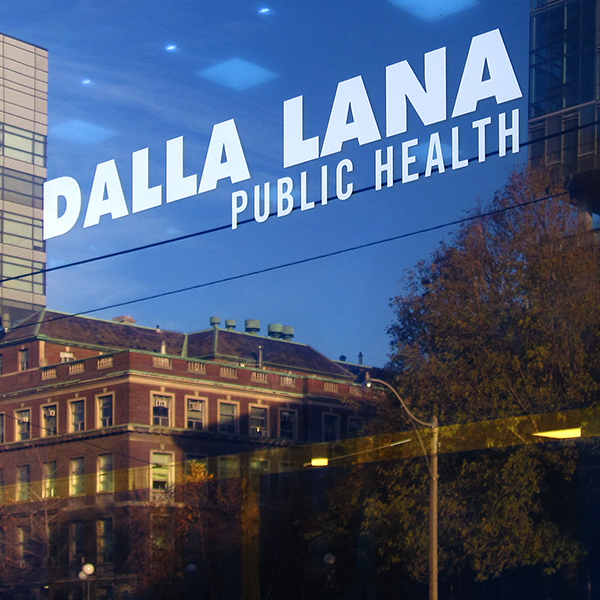
A window displaying the faculty wordmark

By the 1960s, Connaught Laboratories had split from the School of Hygiene. U of T sold Connaught Laboratories in 1972, and it eventually became known as Sanofi Pasteur Canada.

The rest of the School of Hygiene was dissolved on June 30, 1975. A new Division of Community Health was established within the Faculty of Medicine, and included three departments: Health Administration, Epidemiology and Biometrics, and Preventive Medicine. Dr. John Hastings oversaw the transformation and was Associate Dean until 1992.

In 1997–8, a Department of Public Health Sciences was created, connecting the Departments of Behavioural Sciences, Preventive Medicine and Biostatistics, the Graduate Department of Community Health, and the Centre for Health Promotion, a process led by Dr. Harvey Skinner.

In 2008, the department became the Dalla Lana School of Public Health, named for the family of developer Paul Dalla Lana. The Dalla Lanas had given $20 million. As of 2018 the school is located at 155 College Street.

In 2014, the School grew by absorbing the Institute for Health Policy, Management & Evaluation.

== Academics and reputation ==
In U.S. News & World Report's 2026–2027 ranking of Best Global Universities for Social Sciences and Public Health, the University of Toronto placed first in Canada and fifth in the world, tied with Johns Hopkins University and Peking University. The University of Toronto was ranked sixth in the world for public health in the 2026 Academic Ranking of World Universities.

== See also ==
- Lawrence Bloomberg Faculty of Nursing
- Leslie Dan Faculty of Pharmacy
- University of Toronto Faculty of Medicine
