= Edith M. Taylor =

Canadian biochemist

Edith M. Taylor (1899-1993) was a Canadian biochemist known primarily for her work in producing novel techniques in vaccine production, especially her work on the production of diphtheria toxoid, while employed as a researcher by Connaught Laboratories in Toronto, Canada.

== Early life and education ==
Taylor was born in 1899 in Toronto to a family of 10 children. She attended the University of Toronto and graduated with a PhD in Chemistry in 1924.

== Career ==
In 1925, Taylor began work with Connaught Laboratories, a public medical research group associated with the University of Toronto. One of her first projects at Connaught involved major contributions to the culturing process of diphtheria toxoid, a non-toxic form of diphtheria toxin safe for vaccination. Connaught had been producing tetanus toxoid since 1927 and, though their product was effective, it also produced unwanted side effects. Taylor lead a research team dedicated to streamlining and improving the production of the toxoid. Taylor's cultures were grown through a broth consisting of veal infusion and hog stomach treated with calcium chloride and nicotinic acid. The toxin cultures produced through Taylor's method were more potent than those produced using commercially available broths. Taylor also contributed to the development of a stabilized version of the Schick toxin made using borate-gelatin-saline. This stabilized toxin did not need to be diluted as heavily as the destabilized variant, allowing a more effective administration of the toxin during Schick diphtheria tests.

Taylor collaborated with Leone Farrell and Robert J. Wilson to develop an improved large-scale pertussis vaccine production technique using a liquid medium. Taylor and Farrell published a paper in the Canadian Journal of Public Health suggesting that constant agitation of the samples and the introduction of a small amount of formalin could promote continuous growth of the samples and reduce clumping, respectively. Taylor also conducted a study examining the effectiveness of variants on the pertussis vaccine. She compared a concentrated, a heated, and a control version of the vaccine using several tests. She was not, however, able to find consistency among the results and reached no conclusion as to which vaccine was the most effective.

Taylor applied in 1948 to patent a novel strategy for producing heparin, a form of anticoagulant. The patent was granted to the University of Toronto in 1952. Patents were also granted in both Canada and Germany. The method involves mincing animal tissue, the lungs, intestines, and pancreases of sheep and cows, and mincing these samples with water to allow the proteins to coagulate over heat. This coagulated sample is then digested using proteolytic enzyme to yield an extract from which pure heparin can be extracted. This mechanism proved more effective than the old method of extracting heparin by applying the digestive enzyme to the sample before separating the proteins, increasing the yield of heparin in each sample.

In 1949, Taylor developed an apparatus and technique for using formalin vapor in the sterilization of plastic syringes that would melt in a steam-based sterilization system.

Taylor also contributed to Connaught Laboratories research on the polio vaccine. In 1957, she developed a variant of the Nash colorimetric method for determining an estimation of the formaldehyde content in Polio vaccines.

Taylor was awarded the title of Officer of the Most Excellent Order of the British Empire in 1946 for her development of a mass-produced tetanus vaccine to distribute to soldiers during World War 2. After many more years of work at the through Connaught Laboratories at the University of Toronto, she retired in 1962.
