= Leone N. Farrell =

Canadian biochemist (b. 1904, d. 1986)

- Born: 1904; Monkland, Ontario
- Died: 1986 (aged 81–82)
- Education: University of Toronto
- Known for: Vaccines
- Scientific career
- Fields: Biochemistry; Microbiology
- Workplaces: National Research Council of Canada, London School of Hygiene and Tropical Medicine, Connaught Research Laboratories

Leone Norwood Farrell (1904–1986) was a Canadian biochemist and microbiologist who identified microbial strains of industrial importance and developed innovative techniques for the manufacture of vaccines and antibiotics. Her inventions enabled the mass production of the polio vaccine.

== Early life and education ==
Farrell was born in Monkland, Ontario, in 1904 and moved to Toronto as a child. She attended Parkdale Collegiate Institute, earning academic prizes in English and history and a science scholarship. She completed her MA on the chemistry of fermentation in 1929 at the University of Toronto. She obtained a PhD in biochemistry from the University of Toronto in 1933, which was rare for women at the time.

== Research ==
Farrell studied yeasts found in honey at the National Research Council of Canada and worked at the London School of Hygiene and Tropical Medicine following her PhD. She was recruited to Toronto's Connaught Research Laboratories in 1934. At Connaught, she worked on a team focused on developing toxoid vaccines for staphylococcus. Upon turning her attention to the pertussis vaccine, she developed a method of rocking bacterial cultures to stimulate growth of the bacteria and increase yield.

She began studying dysentery toxin in 1941 for use as a vaccine due to the wartime rise in infections. In 1943, Connaught undertook a research program to increase penicillin production for the war effort and Farrell identified a strain of penicillium that allowed increased yield of antibiotic. Following the war, she continued her efforts to improve penicillin production.

In 1953, she and her team undertook the challenging task of producing live virus for the polio vaccine in bulk quantities. After months of experimentation, she adapted her rocking method (now termed the Toronto Method) to greatly increase the yield of live virus. The live polio virus was then shipped to the United States to be killed for use in Jonas Salk's field trials, as the Toronto team was the only one that could produce the virus in large enough quantities. When Salk travelled to Toronto to meet the team, Farrell was not allowed to attend the reception because it was held in a room reserved for men only.

A prototype of Farrell's "rocking bottle" equipment was later included in an exhibition about polio at the Smithsonian Institution.

Farrell continued to lead her team, making improvements to the vaccine and its use, as well as developing a method of increasing the production of penicillin. She conducted research and wrote scientific papers about diseases and vaccines, and retired in 1969. Her colleagues describe her as "a very serious person" possessed of "knowledge and mental fertility"; "She was a classic researcher and disciplined in her work to the extent that she knew you laid out a plan and followed it carefully for things to get done."

== Personal life ==
Farrell was remembered as 'very much a lady' by her colleagues and as "a thoroughly charming and pleasant person" by her family. She never married, and lived by herself. Near the end of her life she suffered from dementia; she died in hospital in the presence of family in 1986. She is buried in Park Lawn Cemetery; her grave was initially unmarked, but in the aftermath of a 2005 media profile, her relatives had a headstone erected.
