= Parvathi Basrur =

Indian-Canadian veterinary geneticist

- Born: September 15, 1929; Cheruvathur, Kerala, India
- Died: November 10, 2012; Guelph, Ontario, Canada
- Occupation(s): Veterinary geneticist, college professor
- Children: 2, including Sheela Basrur

Parvathi Koodathil Basrur (September 15, 1929 – November 10, 2012) was an Indian-born Canadian veterinary scientist. She was the first woman appointed to the faculty of the Ontario Veterinary College, where she worked from 1959 until her retirement in 1995.

== Early life and education ==
Basrur was born in Cheruvathur, Kerala. She earned a bachelor's degree in biology and a master's degree in cytology at the University of Mysore. She began doctoral studies at the Research Institute of Bangalore, but moved to Canada in 1955 and completed her Ph.D. at the University of Toronto.

== Career ==
Basrur became Assistant Professor at the University of Guelph's Ontario Veterinary College in 1959, the first woman on the college's faculty. She was promoted to full professor in 1967, and retired as professor emeritus in 1995. Basrur worked with the Canadian International Development Agency on improving livestock breeding and production. Her research was published in academic journals including Nature, Cell, Canadian Journal of Zoology, Biology of Reproduction, Animal Reproduction Science, Canadian Journal of Veterinary Research, Cancer Research, and Canadian Journal of Comparative Medicine.

Basrur was made a Member of the Order of Canada in 2004. She was also honored with a Queen's Jubilee Award, and the University of Guelph Medal of Merit, the YMCA-YWCA Woman of Distinction Award for Life Time Achievement, and the Norden Award for Distinguished Teaching.

== Selected publications ==
Basrur's laboratory at Ontario Veterinary College was extremely productive during her long tenure, and she was estimated to be an author of "about 200 scientific publications", including these:

- "The salivary gland chromosomes of seven segregates of Prosimulium (Diptera: Simuliidae) with a transformed centromere" (1959)
- "Blood Culture Method for the Study of Bovine Chromosomes" (1964, with J. P. W. Gilman)
- "Morphologic and synthetic response of normal and tumor muscle cultures to nickel sulfide" (1967, with J. P. W. Gilman)
- "Parallelism in chimeric ratios in heterosexual cattle twins" (1969, with H. Kanagawa)
- "Recessive male-determining genes" (1978, with Stephen S. Wachtel and Gloria C. Koo)
- "Morphological and hormonal features of an ovine and a caprine intersex" (1984, with W. T. Bosu}
- "Steroidogenesis in fetal bovine gonads" (1988, with M. M. Dominguez and R. M. Liptrap)
- "Genetic Diseases of Sheep and Goats" (1990, with Bhola R. Yadav)
- "Chromosomal abnormalities in bovine embryos and their influence on development" (1996, with Sheldon J. Kawarsky, Robert B. Stubbings, Peter J. Hansen, and W. Allen King)
- "Influence of the duration of gamete interaction on cleavage, growth rate and sex distribution of in vitro produced bovine embryos" (2003, with Harpreet S. Kochhar, Kanwal P. Kochhar, and W. Allen King)

== Personal life ==
Her husband was Vasanth Basrur, a fellow biology student at Mysore. They married in Toronto while they were both doctoral students. One of their two daughters was Sheela Basrur, a Canadian physician and public health official who died in 2008. Basrur died in 2012, aged 83 years, at a hospital in Guelph.
