= James FitzGerald (writer) =

Canadian writer

James FitzGerald is a Canadian writer, who won the 2010 Writers' Trust Non-Fiction Prize for his book What Disturbs Our Blood: A Son's Quest to Redeem the Past.

The book explores the career and eventual suicide of FitzGerald's grandfather, prominent Canadian physician John G. FitzGerald. He had previously won a National Magazine Award for "Sins of the Fathers", a 2002 article in Toronto Life which was expanded into What Disturbs Our Blood.

FitzGerald previously published Old Boys: The Powerful Legacy of Upper Canada College in 1994.
