= John G. FitzGerald =

Canadian physician (1882–1940)

FitzGerald

John Gerald "Gerry" FitzGerald (December 9, 1882, in Drayton, Ontario – June 20, 1940) was a Canadian physician and public health specialist who was instrumental in the control of diphtheria, first by producing and freely distributing antitoxin, and then in 1924 by using mass production to enable widespread use of the vaccine devised by Gaston Ramon.

FitzGerald, the son of a pharmacist, attended the University of Toronto Medical School, graduating in 1903. He initially studied psychiatry, and did internships at Johns Hopkins Hospital and Sheppard Pratt before becoming the clinical director and chief pathologist of the Toronto Asylum for the Insane in 1907, where he worked under Charles Kirk Clarke. In 1909, he spent a year at Harvard University studying bacteriology, and in 1910 he married heiress Edna Leonard; they spent their honeymoon traveling Europe, where he worked with Emile Roux at the Pasteur Institute.

In 1913, he became an associate professor of hygiene at the University of Toronto, in which position he prepared Canada's first locally made rabies vaccine, and in early 1914, he used money from his wife's inheritance to found the University of Toronto Anti-Toxin Laboratories (renamed Connaught Laboratories in 1917), where he produced diphtheria antitoxins distributed without charge (funded by the Ontario government): "within reach of everyone".

In 1921, the Ontario Royal Commission on University Finances reported that "the work of the Connaught Antitoxin Laboratories is analogous to that done in the Pasteur Institutes in France and Belgium and to that of the Lister Institute in London, with this advantage on the side of these Laboratories that the Connaught Antitoxin Laboratories are an organic part of the University, are self-supporting and provide funds and facilities for research in Preventive Medicine and also opportunity for graduate teaching in Public Health." That same year in the physiology laboratory two floors above FitzGerald's Connaught Labs office, Frederick Banting and Charles Best under the auspices of John Macleod successfully extracted insulin from the pancreas of dogs, fetal calves, and adult cows. In particular, Banting's experimental work with calf pancreas tissue took place at Connaught's farm site, where calves were involved in smallpox vaccine production. FitzGerald had arranged access to Connaught's modest facilities, along with $5,000 from the Labs' reserves, to expedite the team's work. In the months that followed, the researchers worked to refine the extracts to a degree safe for human injection with the help of biochemist James Collip. When tensions mounted during this time between the four "co-discovers" of insulin, FitzGerald stepped in as peacemaker to prepare a seminal research and development agreement between the Connaught Laboratories and the researchers. It established two key conditions: 1) that the collaborators would sign a contract agreeing not to take out a patent with a commercial pharmaceutical firm during an initial working period with Connaught; and 2) that no changes in the research policy would be allowed unless first discussed among FitzGerald and the four collaborators.

In 1927, FitzGerald founded the University of Toronto's School of Hygiene with sponsorship from the Rockefeller Foundation. In 1931, the Foundation hired him as Scientific Director of their International Health Division (a position he retained until 1934), and in 1932 the University of Toronto named him Dean of Medicine (a position he retained until 1936). In 1936, he spent a year traveling the world, assessing medical schools in 24 countries for the League of Nations.

== Death ==
On June 20, 1940, FitzGerald committed suicide by severing the femoral artery in his thigh. His funeral was held at the University of Toronto's Convocation Hall; Frederick Banting and Charles Best were among his pallbearers.

The University of Toronto's FitzGerald Building, home of several departments associated with the faculty of medicine, is named for him, as is the FitzGerald Academy, a network of hospitals and health agencies providing undergraduate medical training.

In 2004, he was posthumously inducted into the Canadian Medical Hall of Fame.

In 2010, FitzGerald's grandson, historian and author James FitzGerald, published the Hilary Weston Writers' Trust Prize for Nonfiction-winning What Disturbs Our Blood, a family biography detailing the medical accomplishments of two generations of FitzGeralds, and the mental illnesses which led to their suicides.
