= Toronto Public Health =

Public health unit in Toronto, Canada

Agency overview
- Formed: 1998
- Type: Public health unit
- Jurisdiction: Toronto, Ontario
- Headquarters: 277 Victoria Street Toronto, Ontario
- Employees: 2,486 (2021)
- Annual budget: CA$344,596,400 (2021)
- Agency executive: Dr. Michelle Murti, Medical Officer of Health
- Parent organization: City of Toronto
- Key document: Health Protection and Promotion Act
- Website: www.toronto.ca/health

Toronto Public Health (TPH) is the public health unit in Toronto, Ontario. It is responsible for delivering public health programs and services, enforcing public health regulations and advising Toronto City Council on health issues. The current unit was formed in 1998, when the former Metropolitan Toronto and its constituent municipalities of Toronto, York, North York, Scarborough, Etobicoke, and East York amalgamated into the current city of Toronto.

== Role ==
In Ontario, under the Health Protection and Promotion Act, a public health unit (PHU) is an official health agency established by a municipality. PHUs administer health promotion and disease prevention programs to inform the public about healthy life-styles, communicable disease control, immunization, food premises inspection, healthy growth and development, health education for all age groups, and selected screening services.

Health units are governed by a board of health, which is an autonomous corporation under the act and is administered by the Medical Officer of Health, who reports to the board of health.

== Programs ==
=== Dinesafe ===
In 2001, under then medical officer of health Dr. Sheela Basrur, TPH introduced Dinesafe, the City of Toronto's food safety program which inspects restaurants for compliance with health regulations, and publicly displays results (pass, conditional pass or closed) both on-site and on the City's website.

=== Infectious disease control ===
==== SARS ====
During the Severe acute respiratory syndrome (SARS) crisis in 2003, TPH under then medical officer of health Dr. Sheela Basrur lead the City of Toronto's response to the virus. TPH created a management system, with different operational teams responsible for different parts of the response. TPH teams monitored those infected and under quarantine, were responsible for epidemiology, tracing the movements and contacts of those infected, and tracking the virus itself. Much of the public communications effort was also led by TPH, who organized community meetings, contacted school boards, and kept the population informed. As a result of SARS, TPH "totally reorganized itself", with a stronger liaison unit with acute-care facilities and changes being made to better address public health on a provincial and federal level.

==== COVID-19 ====
TPH was responsible for coordinating the City of Toronto's response to the international outbreak of COVID-19. On January 7, 2020, TPH was informed of a "undiagnosed viral pneumonia" in Wuhan, China, and began to monitor and develop a response plan should it spread to Toronto. TPH released a statement on January 21 that it was "actively monitoring" the virus. On March 19, 2020, TPH ordered restaurants and bars to halt dine-in service amid evidence of community spread.

TPH collaborated with the University of Toronto to interpret self-reported symptom data provided by the COVID Near You platform, based out of Harvard Medical School and Boston Children's Hospital. The platform was launched in Canada on April 3, 2020, with results of the analysis shared with the Centers for Disease Control and Prevention (CDC).

On September 11, 2020, the Public Health Agency of Canada announced $13.9 million in funding for TPH to establish a "voluntary self-isolation centre" for eligible residents facing "difficulty properly isolating themselves." The Toronto Voluntary Isolation Centre officially opened the following day in a converted hotel. TPH administered the facility, including identifying eligible cases.

== Board of Health ==
The Board of Health is a committee of the City of Toronto, governed by the Health Protection and Promotion Act, which directs and oversees the work of Toronto Public Health. It is composed of six city council members, six members of the public, and one education representative. A chair and vice-chair are elected from amongst its members.

Current members (as of 3 December 2019)
Name	Type	Term start	Notes
Ashna Bowry	Member	31 January 2019	—
Joe Cressy	Councillor	13 December 2018	Chair
Stephanie Donaldson	Member	31 January 2019	TDSB Trustee
Angela Jonsson	Member	31 January 2019	—
Cynthia Lai	Councillor	13 December 2018	—
Mike Layton	Councillor	13 December 2018	—
Ida Li Preti	Member	31 January 2019	TCDSB Trustee
Jennifer McKelvie	Councillor	31 January 2019	—
Kate Mulligan	Member	31 January 2019	—
Gord Perks	Councillor	13 December 2018	—
Peter Wong	Member	31 January 2019	—
Soo Wong	Member	31 January 2019	—
Kristyn Wong-Tam	Councillor	13 December 2018	Vice Chair

== Medical Officer of Health ==
The Medical Officer of Health is responsible for day-to-day operations of Toronto Public Health, and reports to Toronto City Council through the Board of Health.

Toronto Medical Officers of Health, before 1998 amalgamation
Name	Term start/end	Notes
William Canniff	1883–1890	
A.R. Pyne	1890–1891	Acting
Norman Allen	1891–1893	
Charles Sheard	1893–1910	
Charles Hastings	1910–1929	
G.P. Jackson	1929–1951	
L.A. Pequegnat	1951–1958	
A.R.J. Boyd	1958–1972	
G.W.O. Moss	1972–1981	
Alexander S. Macpherson	1981–1989	
Perry Kendall	1989–1995	
David McKeown	1995–1997	

Toronto Medical Officers of Health (since 1998 amalgamation)
Name	Term start/end	Notes
Sheela Basrur	1998–2004	former MOH, Borough of East York
Barbara Yaffe	2004	Acting
David McKeown	2004–2016	former MOH, Borough of East York, City of Toronto and Region of Peel
Barbara Yaffe	2016	Acting
Eileen de Villa	2017–2024	former MOH for the Region of Peel
Na-Koshie Lamptey	2025	Acting
Michelle Murti	2025–present	former Ontario associate chief medical officer of health

== See also ==
- Health in Toronto
- Toronto Paramedic Services
