= Typhus vaccine =

Vaccines to prevent different types of typhus

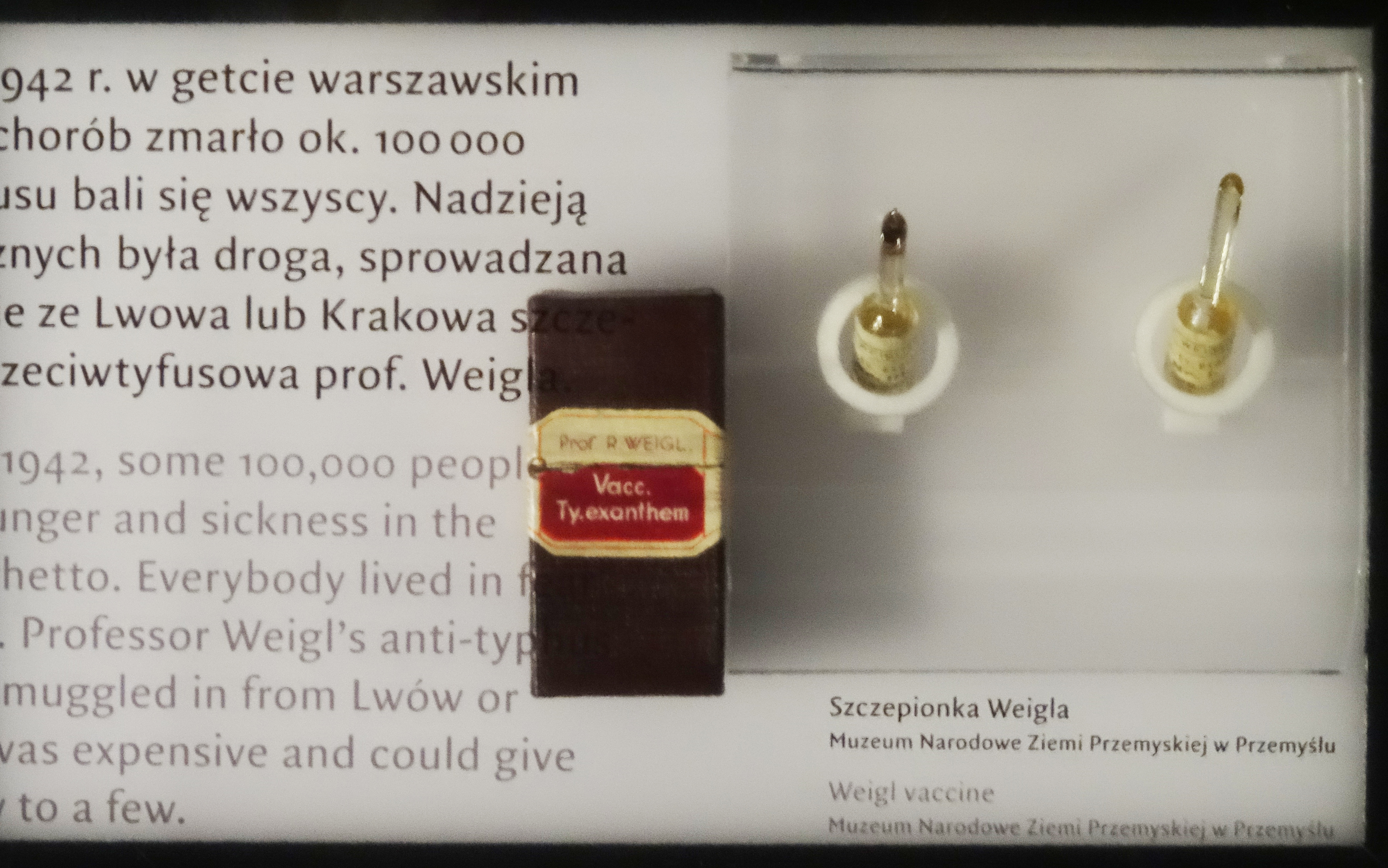
- Vaccine for epidemic typhus, developed by Rudolf Weigl

Vaccine description
- Target: Typhus
- Vaccine type: Inactivated

Clinical data
- ATC code: J07AR01 (WHO)

Identifiers
- ChemSpider: none

Typhus vaccines are intended to protect against different strains of typhus, including epidemic typhus (louse-borne typhus), murine typhus (flea-borne typhus), and scrub typhus. According to the U.S. Centers for Disease Control (CDC), as of 2025 there were no commercially available vaccines for any of the three major typhus strains.

Early attempts to develop typhus vaccines focused on epidemic typhus, caused by the Rickettsia prowazekii bacteria and carried by lice. Hans Zinsser created one of the first such vaccines in 1932; it involved using dead bacteria to increase the body's immune response. During that same period, Rudolf Weigl led a Poland-based team, which included Ludwik Fleck, to develop an epidemic typhus vaccine. It proved somewhat dangerous and costly to make, but was effective in protecting Belgian missionaries in China in the late 1930s.

The need for a viable typhus vaccine was particularly acute during World War II when the disease killed many soldiers. Among U.S. troops, the disease was controlled by administering available vaccines, and by using pesticides against the proliferation of lice in crowded living quarters.

Typhus vaccine research has also been spurred by concerns that Rickettsia could be weaponized into a biological agent.

== See also ==
- Hans Zinsser
- Rudolf Weigl
- Ludwik Fleck
