= Jay McLean =

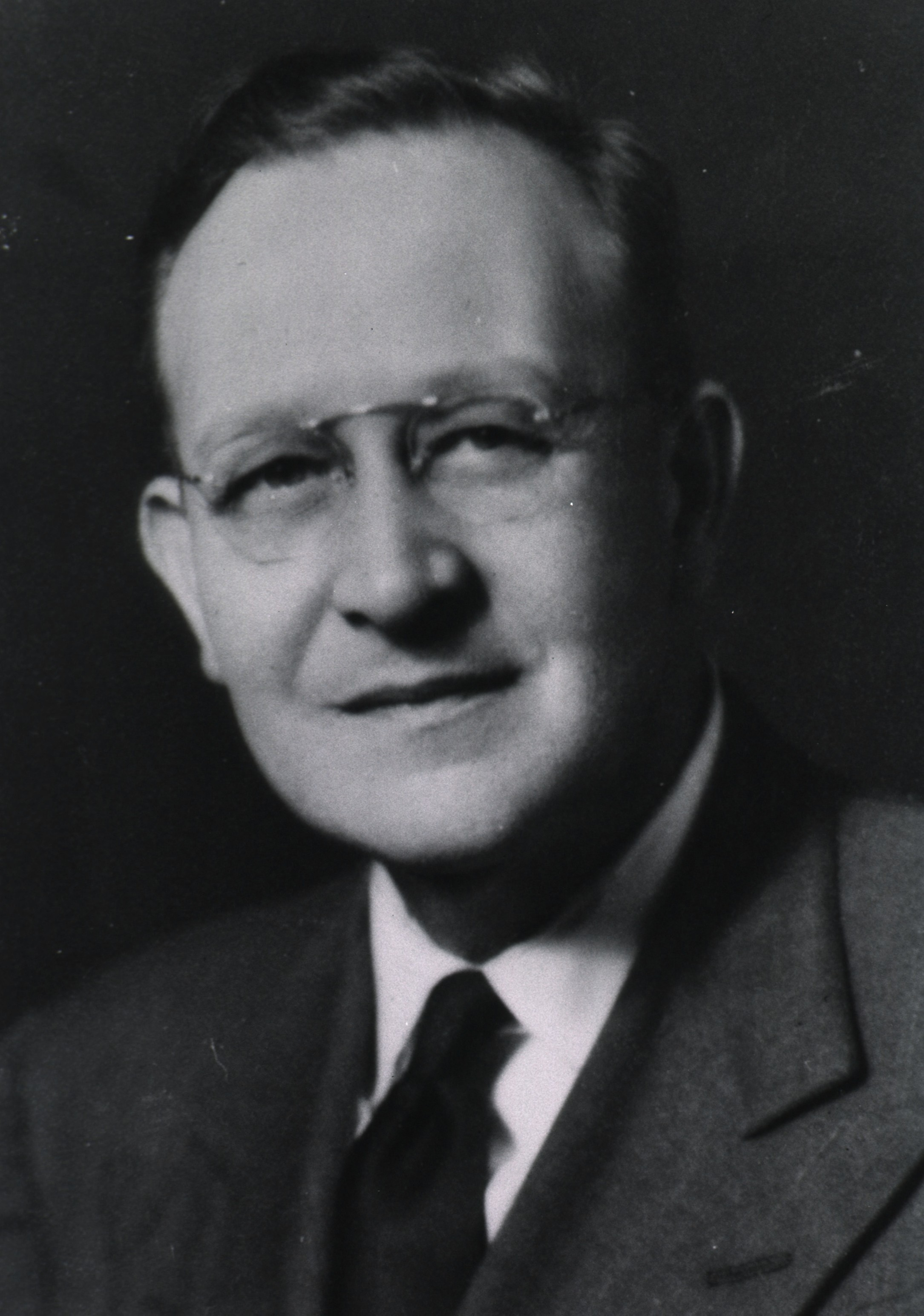
- Born: San Francisco, California, United States
- Died: Savannah, Georgia, United States
- Known for: Heparin
- Medical career
- Profession: Physician

Jay McLean (1890 – November 14, 1957) was an American surgeon. He is most notable for his major contribution to the discovery of heparin.

== Early life ==
Born in San Francisco in 1890, he was the son of a physician, John T. McLean. McLean's family lost their home and assets in the 1906 San Francisco earthquake. McLean set out to become a surgeon during his last year at Lowell High School. Following education at Lowell High School, he entered the University of California at Berkeley in 1909, obtaining his Bachelor of Science degree in 1914.

== Career ==
McLean moved to Baltimore following his graduation from the University of California before receiving an acceptance from Johns Hopkins School of Medicine. Following his move he was informed of a vacancy at the school and began his medical studies in 1915. McLean entered Johns Hopkins School of Medicine in 1915 where he met and began work with physiologist William Henry Howell. Howell admitted McLean into his laboratory and assigned him the task of investigating if an impurity was the cause of the pro-coagulating effect of cephalin or if cephalin itself had a naturally pro-coagulating effect and to compare it to other phosphatides. In 1916, when McLean was a second-year medical student, he was investigating pro-coagulant compounds when he first isolated a fat-soluble phosphatide anti-coagulant. This anti-coagulant was first isolated from the liver tissue of canines, which is how Heparin got its name(hepar or "ήπαρ" is Greek for "liver"; hepar + -in), first coined in 1918. Following the departure of McLean, Howell continued his work and with the assistance of T. Emmett Holt he isolated a water-soluble polysaccharide anticoagulant. Howell also coined 'heparin' as the name of this compound despite being different from the compound previously discovered by McLean.

McLean graduated from Johns Hopkins in 1919 and began an internship at the Johns Hopkins Hospital. Following completion of his internship, he began a surgical residency, in which he rotated through the Hunterian Laboratory, the laboratory founded by Harvey Cushing in 1904.

McLean stayed in Baltimore until 1924 when returned to his alma-mater, the University of California to become an instructor in surgery. After three years in California, McLean took a position in the Department of Pathology at Cornell University, a position which he held until 1939. After leaving Cornell, McLean moved to Columbus, Ohio, where he worked in private surgical practice and was appointed as an associate professor of surgery at Ohio State medical school. In 1949, he was appointed director of Radiation Therapy and Consultant in Malignant Diseases in Savannah, Georgia, where he remained until his death in 1957, aged 67 years. 6 years after McLean passed away he was awarded a plaque by the Upjohn Company to Johns Hopkins School of Medicine for his work in the discovery of heparin as a second-year medical student.
