= Public Health Unit =

Government organization in Ontario, Canada

In Ontario, a Public Health Unit (PHU; French: Bureaux de santé) is a government organization under the supervision of a local board of health. A PHU is under the direction of a Medical Officer of Health (MOH), who is appointed by the supervising board of health. The principle legislation governing PHUs is the Health Protection and Promotion Act.

A Public Health Unit administers health programming such as communicable disease control, food premise inspection, and health education. Funding is provided by both the province and the municipality.

== List of PHUs ==
- Algoma Public Health Unit, Sault Ste. Marie
- Brant County Health Unit, Brantford
- Chatham-Kent Health Unit, Chatham
- Durham Region Health Department, Whitby
- Eastern Ontario Health Unit, Cornwall
- Grey Bruce Health Unit, Owen Sound
- Haldimand-Norfolk Health Unit, Simcoe
- Haliburton, Kawartha, Pine Ridge District Health Unit, Port Hope
- Halton Region Health Department, Oakville
- Hamilton Public Health Services, Hamilton
- Hastings and Prince Edward Counties Health Unit, Belleville
- Huron Perth District Health Unit, Stratford
- Kingston, Frontenac and Lennox & Addington Public Health, Kingston
- Lambton Public Health, Point Edward
- Leeds, Grenville and Lanark District Health Unit, Brockville
- Middlesex-London Health Unit, London
- Niagara Region Public Health Department, Thorold
- North Bay Parry Sound District Health Unit, North Bay
- Northwestern Health Unit, Kenora
- Ottawa Public Health, Ottawa
- Peel Public Health, Mississauga
- Peterborough Public Health, Peterborough
- Porcupine Health Unit, Timmins
- Renfrew County and District Health Unit, Pembroke
- Simcoe Muskoka District Health Unit, Barrie
- Southwestern Public Health, St. Thomas
- Sudbury & District Health Unit, Sudbury
- Thunder Bay District Health Unit, Thunder Bay
- Timiskaming Health Unit, New Liskeard
- Toronto Public Health, Toronto
- Region of Waterloo, Public Health, Waterloo
- Wellington-Dufferin-Guelph Public Health, Guelph
- Windsor-Essex County Health Unit, Windsor
- York Region Public Health Services, Newmarket

== History ==
Health units previously were at the municipal level, meaning that small villages or lowly-populated townships would have their own health programs. As of 1931, Ontario had 944 Medical Officers of Health, of which only 12 were full-time. Advocates for amalgamation included Dr. John Morrow Robb, the provincial Minister of Health from 1930 to 1934. He noted in 1931 that by banding together, municipalities could hire someone full-time.

This sort of call continued for decades, with the Lakeshore Board of Education in 1956 asking the councils of the Town of Mimico, Town of New Toronto, and Village of Long Branch to consider forming one central service. In 1960, the Toronto Board of Health chair called for a Metro-wide board, stating "epidemics don't recognize municipal boundaries. The present chaotic division of health responsibilities is ridiculous." Such moves were opposed as of 1967, with Metro's six mayors claiming that one body couldn't serve two million residents. One chair suggested that a merger would lead to a "lowest common denominator" approach.
