= Robert Defries =

Robert Davies Defries
- Born: July 23, 1889; Toronto, Ontario
- Died: October 25, 1975 (aged 86)
- Awards: Order of Canada

Robert Davies Defries, CC CBE (July 23, 1889 – October 25, 1975) was a Canadian physician and Director of Connaught Medical Research Laboratories.

Born in Toronto, Ontario, he received his M.D. from the University of Toronto in 1913.

== Honours ==
- In 1946 he was made a Commander of the Order of the British Empire.
- In 1955 he was awarded an honorary Doctor of Laws from the University of Saskatchewan.
- In 1955 he received the Albert Lasker Public Service Award.
- In 1970 he was made a Companion of the Order of Canada.
