= Medical officer of health =

Title commonly used for the senior government official of a health department or agency

A medical officer of health, also known as a medical health officer, chief health officer, chief public health officer or district medical officer, is the title commonly used for the senior government official of a health department, usually at a municipal, county/district, state/province, or regional level. The post is held by a physician who serves to advise and lead a team of public health professionals such as environmental health officers and public health nurses on matters of public health importance.

The equivalent senior health official at the national level is often referred to as the chief medical officer (CMO), although the title varies across countries, for example known as the surgeon general in the United States and the chief public health officer in Canada.

== Australia ==
The national senior adviser on health matters is known as the chief medical officer, while those at state and territory level are mostly known as the chief health officer (CHO), with one CMO and one chief public health officer.

== Canada ==
The chief public health officer of Canada is the senior health official for the federal government.

In Ontario, one individual is named chief medical officer of health for the province and has powers to issue guidance, to issue provincial orders, and to coordinate public health responses with medical officers of health, who oversee various public health units.

In British Columbia, the provincial health officer is the senior health official for the provincial government.

The roles of the medical officer of health varies across jurisdictions, but always include responsibilities related to public health and safety, and may include the following functions:

- responsibility for communicable disease control;
- assessing environmental threats to human health;
- providing leadership in public health emergency situations;
- overseeing health surveillance activities;
- providing expert advice on health promotion and disease prevention;
- recommending and developing public health policy.

== India ==
In India, a medical officer generally has a minimum of MBBS degree or MD degree from a recognised medical college and university and his/her name is registered in National Medical Council and in a state medical council. They are posted mainly at primary health centre and community health centres.

== United Kingdom ==
In the United Kingdom, the municipal position was an elected head of the local board of health, however the term MOH has also been used to refer to the chief medical officer. Under the Metropolis Local Management Act 1855, London municipalities were each required to appoint a medical officer. In 1856, 48 officers took up appointments in the city, and these specialists formed Metropolitan Association of Medical Officers of Health. They were important and influential in the establishment of municipal hospitals under the provisions of the Local Government Act 1929. In 1974, NHS reorganisation they were replaced by Community Physicians who were attached to the different levels of the NHS.

== United States ==
The surgeon general of the United States is the senior health officer in the United States.

Health officer is a common term used in the United States for public health officials, such as medical health officers and environmental health officers. They may serve at the global, federal, state, county, or municipal level.

The end of the 20th century and beginning of the 21st saw major issues for health officials and health officers include tobacco control, injury prevention, public health surveillance, disease control, access to health care, health equity, health disparities, cultural competence, access to preventive services such as immunizations and health promotion.

== See also ==
- Environmental health officer
- National public health institutes
