= David Fisman =

Canadian epidemiologist

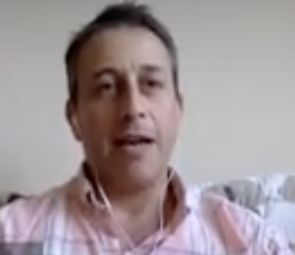
- Fisman in 2020
- Education: University of Western Ontario (M.D.); Harvard School of Public Health (MPH)
- Occupation: Epidemiologist
- Employer: University of Toronto

David N. Fisman is a University of Toronto professor in the area of epidemiology at the Dalla Lana School of Public Health. He also works as an infectious disease specialist and was a consultant at the University Health Network.

== Education ==
Fisman completed his M.D. at University of Western Ontario and a Masters of Public Health at Harvard School of Public Health. Fisman did internal medicine residency training at McGill University in Montreal, Canada and Brown University. He did further training at Beth Israel Deaconess Medical Center and Harvard School of Public Health. At the latter he received a Masters in Public Health.

== Career ==
Fisman is a partner at the National Collaborating Centre for Infectious Diseases (NCCID). He is a member of the Ontario Medical Association (OMA) Speaker's Bureau, through which he offers presentations on emerging infectious diseases, the connection between climate change and infectious diseases, epidemiology of COVID-19, and mathematical modelling of infectious disease. He has participated in presentations and publications for the Institute on Science for Global Policy, including on the topic of infectious disease economics.

Fisman formerly worked at the Child Health Evaluative Sciences wing of the Research Institute of the Hospital for Sick Children, where he published research on the seasonality of infectious diseases supported by the United States National Institute of Allergy and Infectious Diseases (NIAID). He is employed by the University of Toronto at the Dalla Lana School of Public Health as well as the newly established Institute for Pandemics.

Additionally, he has acted as a consultant for JPMorgan Chase, Farallon Capital, the Canada Pension Plan, and WE Charity.

=== COVID-19 ===
Fisman was part of the Ontario COVID-19 Science Advisory Table until his resignation in August 2021, alleging that "grim" COVID-19 projections for the fall of 2021 were being withheld. In June 2020, he supported the use of masks by school children in Canada, at a time when the Hospital for Sick Kids did not consider them necessary. He has supported wider recognition of airborne spread as the primary transmission mechanism for SARS-CoV-2.

Fisman was criticized by the Ontario government for acting as paid consultant for the Elementary Teachers' Federation of Ontario (ETFO), during which he provided evidence that did not support the government's reopening efforts. This occurred while he was serving on the Science Advisory Table, whose director stated that his work with the ETFO "didn't violate any policies". Toronto City Councillor and Board of Health Chair Joe Cressy viewed his efforts as pushing for government accountability. Conversely, Dr. Euzebiusz Jamrozik from the bioethics research centre at the University of Oxford noted that this relationship should have been disclosed as a potential conflict of interest. Fisman noted his relationship as an advisor to the ETFO on a January 26, 2021 disclosure form to the Science Advisory Table, but indicated that this was not related to COVID-19.

Fisman also disclosed receiving honorarium for advisory roles from Pfizer, AstraZeneca and the Ontario Nurses' Association, related to COVID-19.

On September 26, 2020, Fisman spoke at Temple Israel of London for a session called "COVID-19 Through a Jewish Lens" about the social justice issues presented by the COVID-19 pandemic, with an eye to how Jewish values inform understanding this unprecedented global challenge.

On April 25, 2022, the Canadian Medical Association Journal published a study co-authored by Fisman that claimed unvaccinated Canadians pose a risk to the vaccinated population. Based on modelling scenarios developed by the authors, the study suggested that individuals who have received two or three doses of a COVID-19 vaccine are more likely to be infected with SARS-CoV-2 by an unvaccinated person - conversely, unvaccinated people experienced "decreased attack rates" as a result of mixing with vaccinated people. Fisman and his co-authors concluded that the "equity and justice" for vaccinated individuals should be weighed alongside those of the unvaccinated population when developing vaccination policies in preparation for future seasonal outbreaks and variants. However, Fisman acknowledged that the study's model does not reflect the real world or other factors that should be taken into account when implementing public health measures, such as public anger and politics.

== Personal life ==
Fisman lives in Toronto, Ontario, Canada.
