= McGeer =

McGeer is a surname. Notable people with the surname include:

- Allison McGeer (born 1953), Canadian infectious diseases specialist
- Edith Graef McGeer (1923–2023), American-Canadian neuroscientist
- Gerry McGeer (1888–1947), Canadian lawyer and politician
- Manfred McGeer (1893–1955), Canadian politician
- Pat McGeer (1927–2022), Canadian physician and basketball player

== See also ==
- John McGeer House, a historic house in New York, United States
