= John Lavis =

Canadian physician (born 1965)

John Norman Lavis
- Born: June 11, 1965 (age 61); Montréal, Quebec
- Education: Queen's University, London School of Economics and Political Science, Harvard University
- Awards: Procter and Gamble Canada Fulbright Scholarship (1994–95) National Health Ph.D. Fellowship (1994–97) General Motors/Canadian Institute for Advanced Research Fellowship (1996–97) Canadian Health Services Research Foundation Family Award, 2007
- Scientific career
- Fields: Health systems
- Workplaces: McMaster University, University of Toronto
- Thesis: An Inquiry into the Links between Labour-Market Experiences and Health

John Norman Lavis (born June 11, 1965) is a Canadian physician based in Toronto, Ontario. He is a tenured professor in the Department of Health Evidence and Impact at McMaster University, where he founded and directs the McMaster Health Forum. He is co-lead of Rapid-Improvement Support and Exchange (RISE).

Lavis serves as the director of the World Health Organization's Collaborating Centre for Evidence-Informed Policy and chairs the Advisory Committee on Health Research to the Pan American Health Organization. He additionally holds the Tier 1 Canada Research Chair in Evidence-Informed Health Systems.

He has co-led various research and policy development activities during the COVID-19 pandemic in Ontario, including participation on the Ontario COVID-19 Science Advisory Table and the COVID-19 Evidence Network to Support Decision-Making (COVID-END).

== Early life and education ==
Lavis was born June 11, 1965, in Montréal, Quebec. He earned his MD at Queen's University at Kingston from 1983 to 1989, at which time he joined the Canadian Medical Association and the Ontario Medical Association. He did a rotating internship at North York General Hospital through the University of Toronto from 1989 to 1990, earning him a certificate in Clinical Traineeship in HIV Infection. He then completed a Master of Sciences in Health Planning and Financing at the London School of Economics and Political Science from 1991 to 1992, and briefly worked as a visiting research fellow in the Health Policy Unit at the London School of Hygiene and Tropical Medicine. In 1992, he consulted for the World Health Organization's Global Programme on AIDS on the cost of HIV prevention strategies in developing countries.

He worked as a research fellow at the Institute for Clinical Evaluative Sciences (ICES) then attended Harvard University for his PhD in Health Policy from 1994 to 1997. During the summer of 1995 he worked as a research fellow at the Institute for Work and Health, returning again in June 1996 until his Harvard graduation in 1997.

== Career ==
Lavis was hired as a professor at McMaster University in September 1997. That same year, he performed consulting work for the World Bank and the Conference Board of Canada. In 1998 and 1999, he worked with the Department of Canadian Heritage on the subject of social cohesion and health.

He was given the status of assistant professor at the University of Toronto from January 1999 to June 2001. He was principal investigator for the Health Evidence Applications and Linkage Network (HEALNet) under the National Centres of Excellence from 1999 to 2002. This work with HEALNet was featured at the Fourth International Conference on the Scientific Basis of Health Services in Sydney, Australia in September 2001. He assisted the Milbank Memorial Fund in setting up their population health website in 2000 and 2001.

From 2001 to 2006, Lavis was a Tier 2 Canada Research Chair in Knowledge Transfer and Uptake, and Tier 2 Canada Research Chair in Knowledge Transfer and Exchange from 2006 to 2011. Lavis co-developed the Evidence-Informed Policy Network (EVIPNet) alongside the World Health Organization in the mid-2000s, and he remains co-chair of the global steering group. He founded the McMaster Health Forum in April 2009. He was made co-director of the WHO Collaborating Centre for Evidence-Informed Policy in December 2010. From 2012 to 2017, Lavis was an adjunct professor of global health at Harvard T.H. Chan School of Public Health.

Lavis was awarded the Tier 1 Canada Research Chair in Evidence-Informed Health Systems in January 2015. He became a visiting adjunct professor at the University of Johannesburg in April 2018, and was promoted to director of the WHO Collaborating Centre for Evidence-Informed Policy in December 2018. In July 2019, he began co-leading the Rapid-Improvement Support and Exchange (RISE) program.

=== COVID-19 pandemic ===
Lavis participated as a member of the Ontario COVID-19 Science Advisory Table from 2020 to 2022, where he was responsible for contributing to guidance for provincial decision-making during the COVID-19 pandemic in Ontario.

He is co-lead investigator for the COVID-19 Evidence Network to Support Decision-Making (COVID-END), through which he has gathered evidence syntheses related to protocols for treatment and management of COVID-19 since April 2020. In this role, he also co-led the Global Commission on Evidence to Address Societal Challenges, which published the Evidence Commission report in January 2022.

Lavis participated as a speaker at the March 2022 Centre of Excellence for Development Impact and Learning (CEDIL) conference.

== Research ==
In 2002, Lavis contributed a discussion paper titled Political Elites and Their Influence on Health-Care Reform In Canada to the Commission on the Future of Health Care in Canada (otherwise known as the Romanow Commission).

As the Canada Research Chair in Evidence-Informed Health Systems, Lavis is evaluating how governments prepare themselves and make decisions relating to public health policy. This work is focused both on COVID-19 and long-standing health crises in Canada.

Lavis has published research on the topics of international treaties, evidence-based policy, medical technology in long-term care settings, and international health, among others.

== Other activities ==
- AcademyHealth, member
- AIDS Committee of Toronto, former chair
- Africa Centre for Evidence, adjunct professor
- Canadian Institute for Advanced Research, Population Health Program scholar (1998, 2000–2003)
- Canadian Institutes of Health Research, Health Policy and Systems Management grants review committee chair
- Centre for Health Economics and Policy Analysis (CHEPA), Member (1996–2018)
- Closing the Gap Healthcare, advisory board member
- Commonwealth Fund, Harkness Fellows program Canadian associate (2001–2002)
- European Observatory on Health Systems and Policies, research associate (2007–2010)
- Fife House Foundation, former president
- Health Systems Global, member (2012–present)
- Institut de recherche et de documentation en économie de la santé, visiting researcher (2003–2004)
- Michael G. DeGroote Cochrane Canada Centre, associate director (2016–2018)
- Ontario HIV Treatment Network, Research Network Advisory Committee chair
- Partnership for Evidence and Equity in Responsive Social Systems, Partner Executive Group chair
