= David Earn =

Canadian mathematical epidemiologist

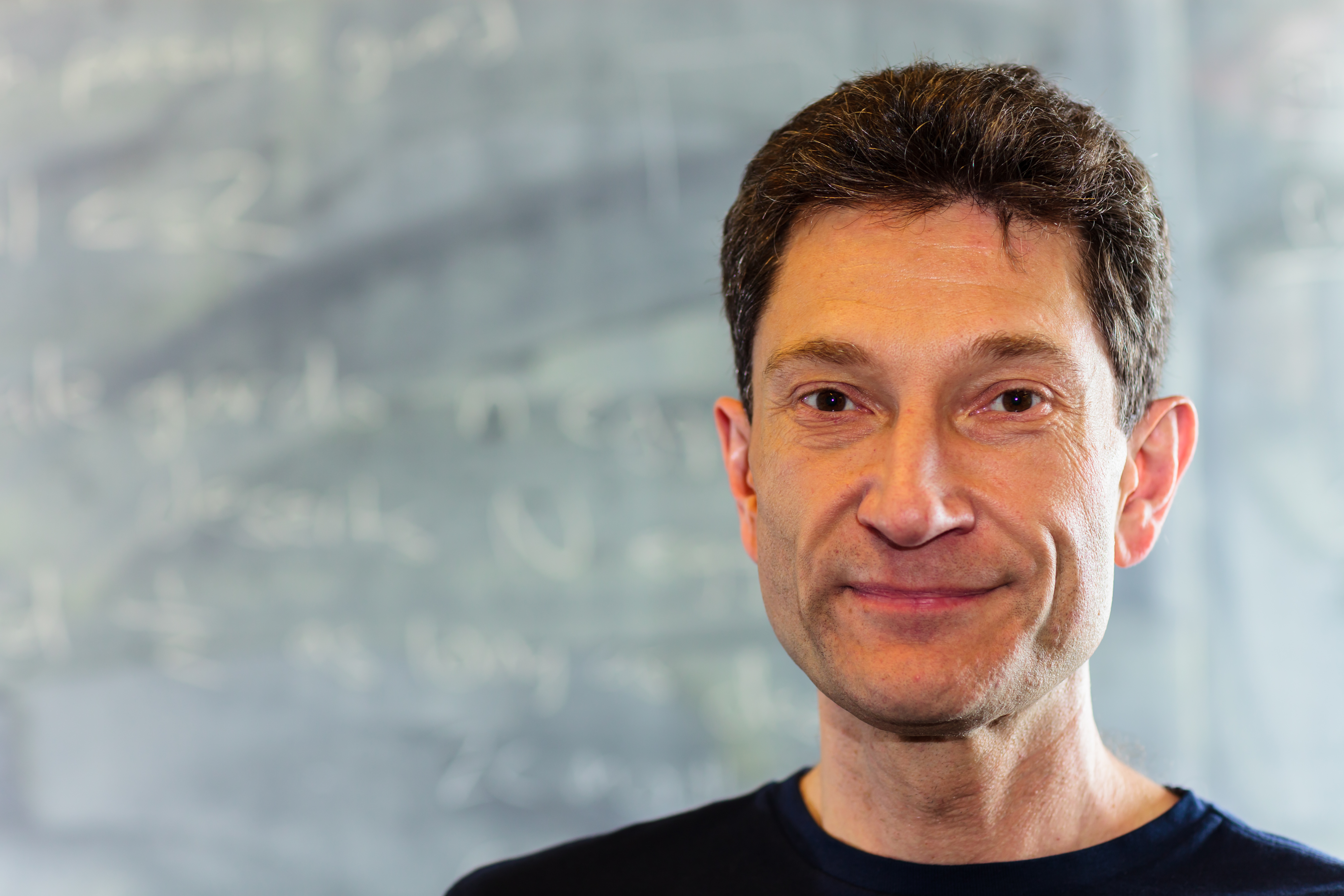
- Earn photographed in the mathematics lab at McMaster University in 2014.
- Born: Winnipeg, Manitoba, Canada

Academic background
- Education: BSc, Mathematics, 1987, MSc, Mathematics, 1989, University of Toronto; PhD, 1993, University of Cambridge
- Thesis: Dynamical stability of galaxies and the solar system
- Doctoral advisor: Donald Lynden-Bell
- Website: davidearn.mcmaster.ca

David J. D. Earn is a Canadian mathematical epidemiologist. He is the Faculty of Science Research Chair in Mathematical Epidemiology in the Department of Mathematics and Statistics at McMaster University. In 2022, Earn was elected a Fellow of the Canadian Academy of Health Sciences.

== Early life and education ==
Earn was born and raised in Winnipeg, Manitoba, Canada. He completed his Bachelor of Science degree and Master's degree at the University of Toronto before completing his Ph.D. at the University of Cambridge under the guidance of Donald Lynden-Bell. Following his PhD, Earn accepted and completed post-doctoral fellowships at Cambridge, Hebrew University of Jerusalem, and Princeton University.

== Career ==
Following his fellowships, Earn joined the faculty at McMaster University as a professor of applied mathematics in January 2000. In this role, he began co-developing a new mathematical model to enable scientists to predict epidemics of infectious diseases with researchers from the University of Florida and University of Cambridge. The model made the prediction that increases or decreases in birth rates or vaccination rates should cause dramatic changes in patterns of epidemics. In developing the model, Earn studied historical data on the outbreaks of measles in London, Liverpool, New York, and Baltimore. Later that year, Earn began developing a mathematical formula to help eliminate measles and other infectious diseases by increasing vaccinations. He hypothesized that upping vaccines for measles once every year, rather than only for children at 13 months, would cause epidemics and low-disease periods to occur simultaneously and annually at the same time and eventually die out. Beyond eradicating infectious diseases in humans, Earn also worked to determine if conservation corridors are a benefit or a threat to endangered species.

As a professor at McMaster and investigator with the Michael G. DeGroote Institute for Infectious Disease Research, Earn co-discovered three factors that contributed to the Spanish flu's waves of infection. His research team determined that the closing and opening of schools, temperature changes and changes in human behaviour were important contributors. He also published a study that investigated whether closing schools could help slow the spread of infectious disease and should be considered as a control measure during pandemic outbreaks. His efforts were recognized with the 2013 Synergy Award from McMaster.

During the COVID-19 pandemic, Earn co-authored a paper entitled "The origins and potential future of SARS-CoV-2 variants of concern in the evolving COVID-19 pandemic." He was also selected to sit on the Ontario COVID-19 Science Advisory Table. In May 2021, Earn was appointed as the Faculty of Science Research Chair in Mathematical Epidemiology. The following year, he was elected a Fellow of the Canadian Academy of Health Sciences for his overall work in infectious disease but was specifically recognized for being "deeply involved in real-time assessment and forecasting of infections, hospitalizations, and deaths" during the COVID-19 pandemic.

== Personal life ==
Earn is married to behavioural ecologist Sigal Balshine.
