= Helen Anne Henderson =

Canadian disability rights activist and journalist

- Born: May 11, 1946; Scotland
- Died: April 11, 2015 (aged 68); Toronto, Ontario, Canada
- Education: Bishop's University; Ryerson University
- Occupation: Journalist

Helen Anne Henderson (May 11, 1946 – April 11, 2015) was a Canadian disability rights activist and journalist.

== Biography ==
Henderson was born on May 11, 1946, in Scotland. In 1954, Henderson and her family immigrated to Quebec. She attended Bishop's University in Quebec for an English degree and later pursued a degree in disability studies at Ryerson University. In 2011, Henderson gave a TEDx talk at Ryerson about seeing the opportunity in people with disabilities.

== Health ==
In the 1970s, Henderson was diagnosed with multiple sclerosis. As a result of her MS, Henderson later used a cane and a wheelchair. Henderson sought palliative care at Bridgepoint Health and died on April 11, 2015, from complications due to lung cancer.

== Career ==
Henderson began writing for the Toronto Star in the 1970s and retired in 2008. Although she began her career at the Star as a business reporter, the first female business reporter there, Henderson eventually began writing a column about disability. Henderson's column was "the longest running disability beat in Canada" according to Katie Ellis.

In 2016, in recognition of Henderson's contributions to disability rights awareness, the Centre for Independent Living in Toronto (CILT) established the Helen Henderson Literary Award "to acknowledge an exceptional piece of writing that raises social awareness of a disability issue or barrier".

== See also ==
- Henderson's TEDx Talk
