= Adolfo García-Sastre =

Spanish-American academic (born 1964)

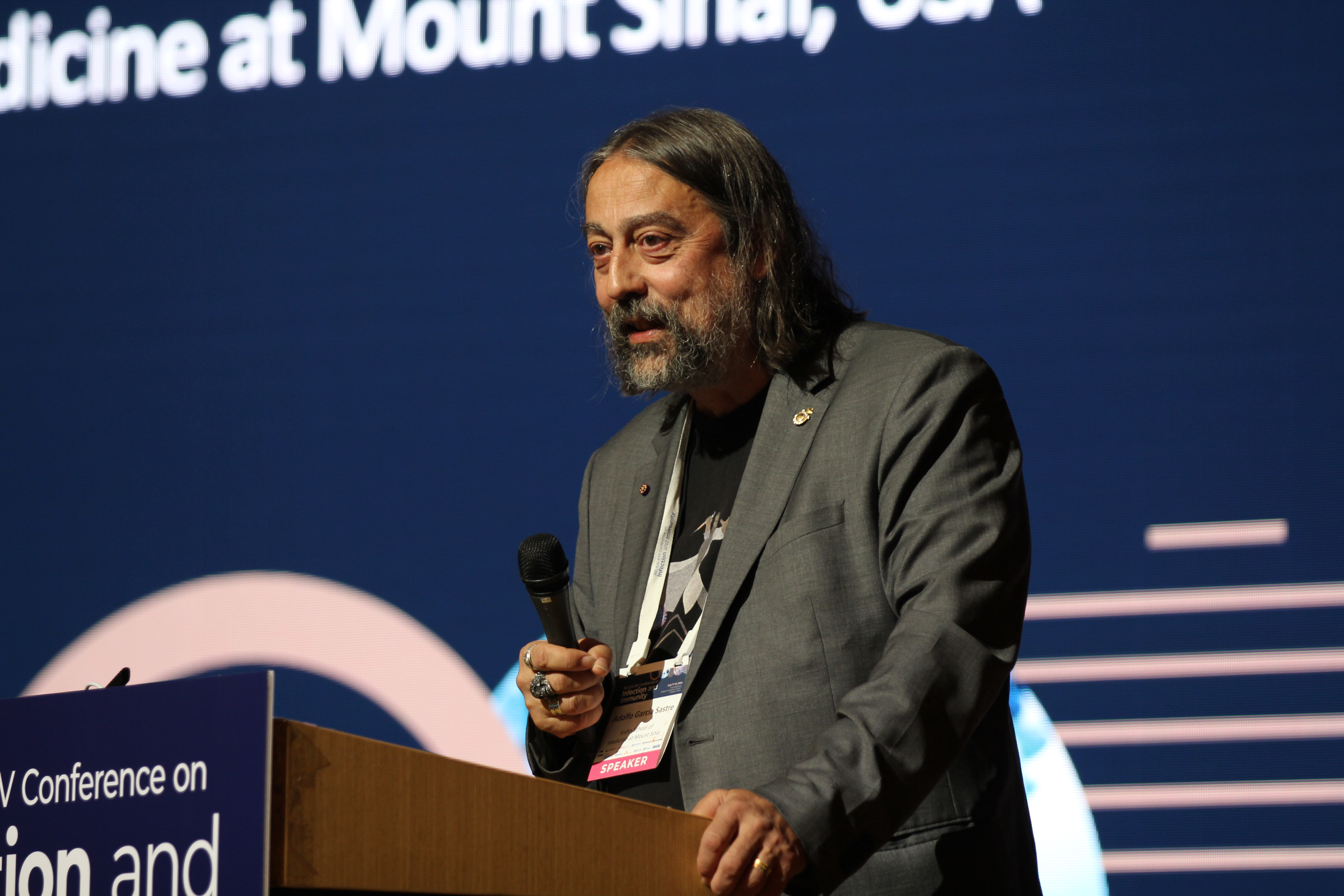
- Born: 10 October 1964 (age 61); Burgos, Spain
- Education: University of Salamanca
- Known for: influenza virus research; reconstruction of the extinct 1918 pandemic influenza virus
- Scientific career
- Fields: Microbiology
- Workplaces: Mount Sinai Medical Center

Adolfo García-Sastre,(born in Burgos, 10 October 1964) is a Spanish professor of Medicine and Microbiology and co-director of the Global Health & Emerging Pathogens Institute at the Icahn School of Medicine at Mount Sinai in New York City. His research into the biology of influenza viruses has been at the forefront of medical advances in epidemiology.

García-Sastre is the author of more than 700 publications.

== Biography ==
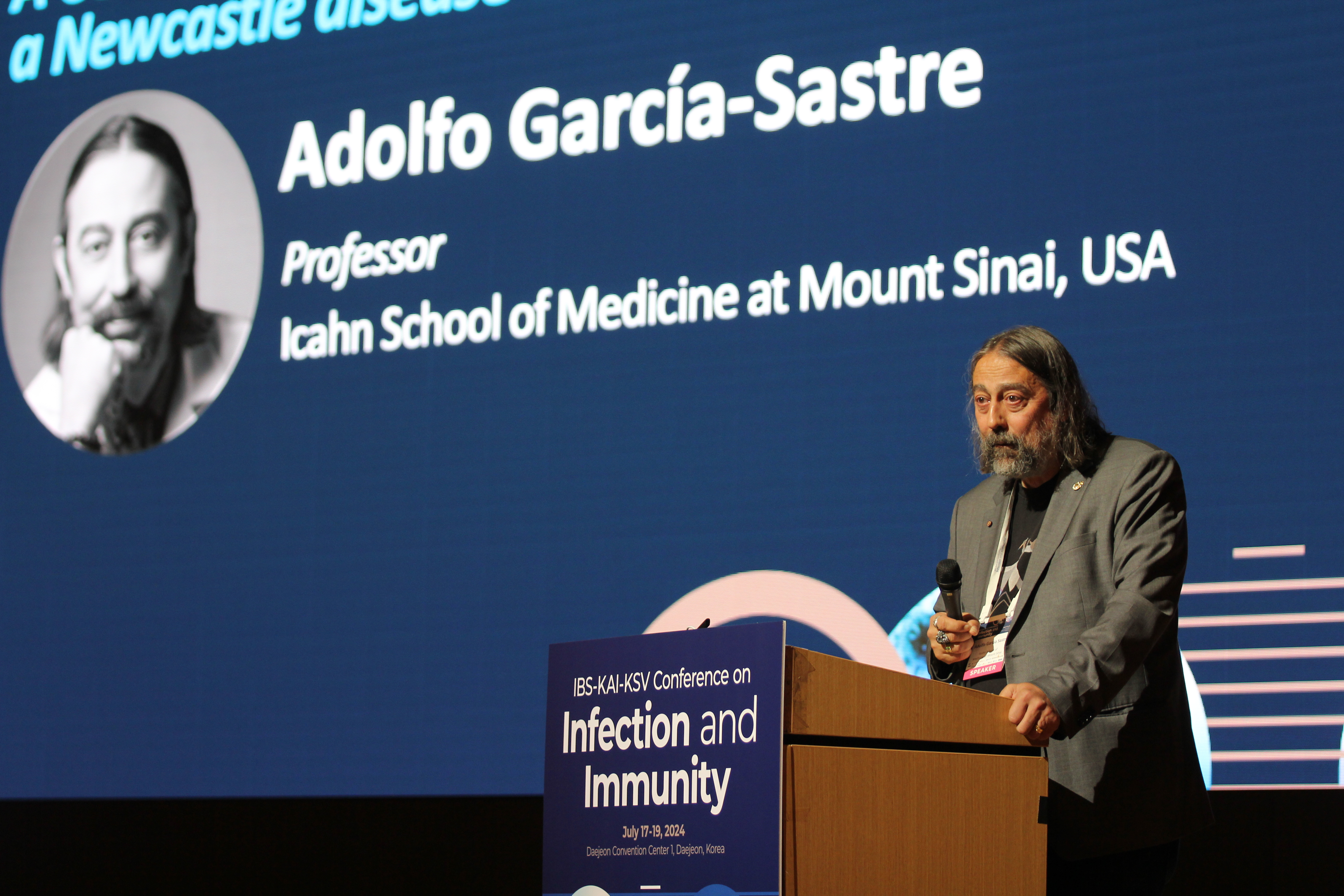
Adolfo García Sastre speaking at a conference in South Korea in 2024.

Born in Burgos, Spain, García-Sastre earned his PhD at the University of Salamanca. His research interest has been focused on the molecular biology of influenza viruses and several other negative-strand RNA viruses. His contributions to his field have included the generation and evaluation of influenza virus vectors as potential vaccine candidates against infectious diseases, including malaria and AIDS, as well as the development (with Peter Palese) of the first reverse-genetic approaches for the production of infectious recombinant influenza viruses from plasmid DNA – research which has resulted in techniques which are now routinely used with many negative strand RNA viruses. He was the first to identify the biological role of the non-structural NS1 Influenza Protein during infection, the first to describe and provide a molecular analysis of a viral-encoded IFN antagonist among negative strand RNA viruses, and the first to demonstrate that the M1 protein of the influenza virus determines its morphology.

In 2005, as principal investigator of an NIAID program project grant, García-Sastre and his team made headlines when they reconstructed the extinct 1918 pandemic influenza virus.

García-Sastre is an editor for the Journal of Experimental Medicine and PLOS Pathogens, and he sits on the editorial boards of the Journal of Virology, Virology, Virus Research and the Journal of General Virology. In 2001, he co-organized the International Course on Viral Vectors in Heidelberg, Germany, which was sponsored by the Federation of European Biochemical Societies (FEBS), as well as the first Research Conference on Orthomyxoviruses, also in 2001, which was held in the Netherlands and sponsored by the European Scientific Working Group on Influenza. He is a co-founder of Vivaldi Biosciences and a member of the company's Scientific Advisory board and is the leader of the basic research component on the NIAID-funded Viral Therapeutics and Pathogenesis of the North East Biodefense Center proposal. He was among the first members of the Vaccine Study Section of the National Institutes of Health. He is also principal investigator for the Center for Research on Influenza Pathogenesis, one of five NIAID Centers of Excellence for Influenza Research and Surveillance (CEIRS).

He was elected to the National Academy of Sciences in 2019.

== Patents ==
García-Sastre holds 7 patents:

Number	Title
20090280144	Recombinant newcastle disease virus RNA expression systems and vaccines
20090203114	Novel methods and Interferon deficient substrates for the propagation of virues
20090061521	Recombinant negative strand RNA virus expression systems and vaccines
20090053264	Attenuated negative strand viruses with altered interferon antagonist activity for use as vaccines and pharmaceuticals
20090028901	Screening methods for identifying viral proteins with interferon antagonizing functions and potential antiviral agents
20090010962	Genetically Engineered Swine Influenza Virus and Uses Thereof
20080254060	Genetically Engineered Equine Influenza Virus and Uses Thereof

== Publications ==
Partial List:

- Mueller, S. N.; Langley, W. A.; Carnero, E.; Garcia-Sastre, A.; Ahmed, R. (2009). "Immunization with Live Attenuated Influenza Viruses That Express Altered NS1 Proteins Results in Potent and Protective Memory CD8+ T-Cell Responses". Journal of Virology. 84 (4): 1847–1855. doi:10.1128/JVI.01317-09. PMC 2812357. PMID 19939929.
- Martinez-Sobrido, L.; Cadagan, R.; Steel, J.; Basler, C. F.; Palese, P.; Moran, T. M.; Garcia-Sastre, A. (2009). "Hemagglutinin-Pseudotyped Green Fluorescent Protein-Expressing Influenza Viruses for the Detection of Influenza Virus Neutralizing Antibodies". Journal of Virology. 84 (4): 2157–2163. doi:10.1128/JVI.01433-09. PMC 2812370. PMID 19939917.
- Nistal-Villán, E.; García-Sastre, A. (2009). "Attacking the flu: New prospects for the rational design of antivirals". Nature Medicine. 15 (11): 1253–1254. doi:10.1038/nm1109-1253. PMC 2881314. PMID 19893557.
- Babiuk, S.; Albrecht, R.; Berhane, Y.; Marszal, P.; Richt, J. A.; Garcia-Sastre, A.; Pasick, J.; Weingartl, H. (2009). "1918 and 2009 H1N1 influenza viruses are not pathogenic in birds". Journal of General Virology. 91 (2): 339–342. doi:10.1099/vir.0.016246-0. PMC 2888309. PMID 19889930.
- Baum, A.; García-Sastre, A. (2009). "Induction of type I interferon by RNA viruses: Cellular receptors and their substrates". Amino Acids. 38 (5): 1283–1299. doi:10.1007/s00726-009-0374-0. PMC 2860555. PMID 19882216.
- Tscherne, D. M.; Manicassamy, B.; García-Sastre, A. (2010). "An enzymatic virus-like particle assay for sensitive detection of virus entry". Journal of Virological Methods. 163 (2): 336–343. doi:10.1016/j.jviromet.2009.10.020. PMC 2814992. PMID 19879300.
- Gannagé, M.; Dormann, D.; Albrecht, R.; Dengjel, J. R.; Torossi, T.; Rämer, P. C.; Lee, M.; Strowig, T.; Arrey, F.; Conenello, G.; Pypaert, M.; Andersen, J.; García-Sastre, A.; Münz, C. (2009). "Matrix Protein 2 of Influenza a Virus Blocks Autophagosome Fusion with Lysosomes". Cell Host & Microbe. 6 (4): 367–380. doi:10.1016/j.chom.2009.09.005. PMC 2774833. PMID 19837376.
- Steel, J.; Staeheli, P.; Mubareka, S.; Garcia-Sastre, A.; Palese, P.; Lowen, A. C. (2009). "Transmission of Pandemic H1N1 Influenza Virus and Impact of Prior Exposure to Seasonal Strains or Interferon Treatment". Journal of Virology. 84 (1): 21–26. doi:10.1128/JVI.01732-09. PMC 2798408. PMID 19828604.
- Richt, J. E. A.; García-Sastre, A. (2009). "Attenuated Influenza Virus Vaccines with Modified NS1 Proteins". Vaccines for Pandemic Influenza. Current Topics in Microbiology and Immunology. Vol. 333. pp. 177–195. doi:10.1007/978-3-540-92165-3_9. ISBN 978-3-540-92164-6. PMID 19768406.
- Kochs, G.; Martinez-Sobrido, L.; Lienenklaus, S.; Weiss, S.; Garcia-Sastre, A.; Staeheli, P. (2009). "Strong interferon-inducing capacity of a highly virulent variant of influenza a virus strain PR8 with deletions in the NS1 gene". Journal of General Virology. 90 (12): 2990–2994. doi:10.1099/vir.0.015727-0. PMC 2887554. PMID 19726611.
- Guo, H.; Kumar, P.; Moran, T. M.; Garcia-Sastre, A.; Zhou, Y.; Malarkannan, S. (2009). "The functional impairment of natural killer cells during influenza virus infection". Immunology and Cell Biology. 87 (8): 579–589. doi:10.1038/icb.2009.60. PMC 2882241. PMID 19721456.
- Martinez-Sobrido, L.; Emonet, S.; Giannakas, P.; Cubitt, B.; Garcia-Sastre, A.; De La Torre, J. C. (2009). "Identification of Amino Acid Residues Critical for the Anti-Interferon Activity of the Nucleoprotein of the Prototypic Arenavirus Lymphocytic Choriomeningitis Virus". Journal of Virology. 83 (21): 11330–11340. doi:10.1128/JVI.00763-09. PMC 2772779. PMID 19710144.
- Billharz, R.; Zeng, H.; Proll, S. C.; Korth, M. J.; Lederer, S.; Albrecht, R.; Goodman, A. G.; Rosenzweig, E.; Tumpey, T. M.; García-Sastre, A.; Katze, M. G. (2009). "The NS1 Protein of the 1918 Pandemic Influenza Virus Blocks Host Interferon and Lipid Metabolism Pathways". Journal of Virology. 83 (20): 10557–10570. doi:10.1128/JVI.00330-09. PMC 2753112. PMID 19706713.
- Bolland, S.; Garcia-Sastre, A. (2009). "Vicious circle: Systemic autoreactivity in Ro52/TRIM21-deficient mice". Journal of Experimental Medicine. 206 (8): 1647–1651. doi:10.1084/jem.20091507. PMC 2722177. PMID 19635865.
- Kuri, T.; Zhang, X.; Habjan, M.; Martinez-Sobrido, L.; Garcia-Sastre, A.; Yuan, Z.; Weber, F. (2009). "Interferon priming enables cells to partially overturn the SARS coronavirus-induced block in innate immune activation". Journal of General Virology. 90 (11): 2686–2694. doi:10.1099/vir.0.013599-0. PMC 2888313. PMID 19625461.
- Frias-Staheli, N.; Giannakopoulos, N. V.; Kikkert, M.; Taylor, S. L.; Bridgen, A.; Paragas, J.; Richt, J. A.; Rowland, R. R.; Schmaljohn, C. S.; Lenschow, D. J.; Snijder, E. J.; García-Sastre, A.; Virgin, H. W. (2007). "Ovarian Tumor Domain-Containing Viral Proteases Evade Ubiquitin- and ISG15-Dependent Innate Immune Responses". Cell Host & Microbe. 2 (6): 404–416. doi:10.1016/j.chom.2007.09.014. PMC 2184509. PMID 18078692.
- Vigil, A.; Park, M. -S.; Martinez, O.; Chua, M. A.; Xiao, S.; Cros, J. F.; Martínez-Sobrido, L.; Woo, S. L. C.; García-Sastre, A. (2007). "Use of Reverse Genetics to Enhance the Oncolytic Properties of Newcastle Disease Virus". Cancer Research. 67 (17): 8285–8292. doi:10.1158/0008-5472.CAN-07-1025. PMID 17804743.
- Mibayashi, M.; Martinez-Sobrido, L.; Loo, Y. -M.; Cardenas, W. B.; Gale, M.; Garcia-Sastre, A. (2006). "Inhibition of Retinoic Acid-Inducible Gene I-Mediated Induction of Beta Interferon by the NS1 Protein of Influenza a Virus". Journal of Virology. 81 (2): 514–524. doi:10.1128/JVI.01265-06. PMC 1797471. PMID 17079289.
- Tumpey, T. M.; Maines, T. R.; Van Hoeven, N.; Glaser, L.; Solórzano, A.; Pappas, C.; Cox, N. J.; Swayne, D. E.; Palese, P.; Katz, J. M.; García-Sastre, A. (2007). "A Two-Amino Acid Change in the Hemagglutinin of the 1918 Influenza Virus Abolishes Transmission". Science. 315 (5812): 655–659. Bibcode:2007Sci...315..655T. doi:10.1126/science.1136212. PMID 17272724. S2CID 24627071.
- Richt, J. A.; Lekcharoensuk, P.; Lager, K. M.; Vincent, A. L.; Loiacono, C. M.; Janke, B. H.; Wu, W. -H.; Yoon, K. -J.; Webby, R. J.; Solórzano, A.; García-Sastre, A. (2006). "Vaccination of Pigs against Swine Influenza Viruses by Using an NS1-Truncated Modified Live-Virus Vaccine". Journal of Virology. 80 (22): 11009–11018. doi:10.1128/JVI.00787-06. PMC 1642165. PMID 16943300.
- Tumpey, T. M.; Basler, C. F.; Aguilar, P. V.; Zeng, H.; Solórzano, A.; Swayne, D. E.; Cox, N. J.; Katz, J. M.; Taubenberger, J. K.; Palese, P.; García-Sastre, A. (2005). "Characterization of the Reconstructed 1918 Spanish Influenza Pandemic Virus". Science. 310 (5745): 77–80. Bibcode:2005Sci...310...77T. doi:10.1126/science.1119392. PMID 16210530. S2CID 14773861.
- Munoz-Jordan, J. L.; Sánchez-Burgos, G. G.; Laurent-Rolle, M.; García-Sastre, A. (2003). "Inhibition of interferon signaling by dengue virus". Proceedings of the National Academy of Sciences. 100 (24): 14333–14338. Bibcode:2003PNAS..10014333M. doi:10.1073/pnas.2335168100. PMC 283592. PMID 14612562.
- Basler, C. F.; Reid, A. H.; Dybing, J. K.; Janczewski, T. A.; Fanning, T. G.; Zheng, H.; Salvatore, M.; Perdue, M. L.; Swayne, D. E.; García-Sastre, A.; Palese, P.; Taubenberger, J. K. (2001). "Sequence of the 1918 pandemic influenza virus nonstructural gene (NS) segment and characterization of recombinant viruses bearing the 1918 NS genes". Proceedings of the National Academy of Sciences. 98 (5): 2746–2751. doi:10.1073/pnas.031575198. PMC 30210. PMID 11226311.
- Garciasastre, A. (2001). "Inhibition of Interferon-Mediated Antiviral Responses by Influenza a Viruses and Other Negative-Strand RNA Viruses". Virology. 279 (2): 375–384. doi:10.1006/viro.2000.0756. PMID 11162793.
- Fodor, E.; Devenish, L.; Engelhardt, O. G.; Palese, P.; Brownlee, G. G.; García-Sastre, A. (1999). "Rescue of Influenza a Virus from Recombinant DNA". Journal of Virology. 73 (11): 9679–9682. doi:10.1128/JVI.73.11.9679-9682.1999. PMC 113010. PMID 10516084.
