= Nicole Bouvier =

American physician

- Education: Icahn School of Medicine at Mount Sinai; Williams College; Columbia University
- Scientific career
- Workplaces: Icahn School of Medicine at Mount Sinai; Mount Sinai Hospital

Nicole M. Bouvier is an American physician who is an Assistant Professor of Medicine at Icahn School of Medicine at Mount Sinai. Her research considers the environmental and viral factors that impact respiratory transmission of influenza viruses.

== Early life and education ==
Bouvier was a student of studio arts at Williams College. She moved to Columbia University as a medical student, where she completed her pre-medical coursework. She received her Doctor of Medicine degree from the Icahn School of Medicine at Mount Sinai, where she graduated with a Distinction in Research. She was a medical intern and resident at the Mount Sinai Hospital. After graduating, Bouvier was appointed a postdoctoral research fellow on the Physician-Scientist Research Training Program, where she worked alongside Peter Palese and started to study transmission of influenza that is resistant to oseltamivir. Bouvier makes use of guinea pig models.

== Research and career ==
Bouvier was a clinical fellow in infectious disease at Mount Sinai Hospital from 2009 and appointed Assistant Professor in 2011. She has studied the impact of highly transmissible, highly pathogenic influenza viruses.

In 2018, Bouvier told the Chicago Tribune, "It certainly is possible that a flu virus could again arise in the animal reservoir that is more pathogenic than the typical flu,". She said that despite the risk, medical researchers were much better prepared to create vaccinations more quickly. In 2019, she showed that louder talkers are more likely to spread airborne diseases.

During the early days of the COVID-19 pandemic, Bouvier was involved with a study into the efficacy of convalescent plasma as a treatment for COVID-19. She studied the transfer of SARS-CoV-2 in both airborne dust and expiratory droplets. She investigated the impact of face masks on the flow or airborne particles, and found it reduced the flow of particles considerably. Even when the masks were poorly fitting (e.g. surgical and cloth face masks), the efficiency was around 70% for talking and 90% for coughing.

== Awards and honors ==
- 2016 Sir William Osler Young Investigator Award

== Selected publications ==
- Nicole M Bouvier; Peter Palese (2008). "The biology of influenza viruses". Vaccine. 26 Suppl 4: D49-53. doi:10.1016/j.vaccine.2008.07.039. PMC 3074182. PMID 19230160. Wikidata Q24620598.
- Sima Asadi; Anthony S. Wexler; Christopher D. Cappa; Santiago Barreda; Nicole M. Bouvier; William D. Ristenpart (2019). "Aerosol emission and superemission during human speech increase with voice loudness". Scientific Reports. 9 (1). doi:10.1038/s41598-019-38808-z. PMC 6382806. PMID 30787335. Wikidata Q64263318.
- Sima Asadi; Nicole Bouvier; Anthony S Wexler; William D Ristenpart (2020). "The coronavirus pandemic and aerosols: Does COVID-19 transmit via expiratory particles?". Aerosol Science and Technology. 0 (0): 1–4. doi:10.1080/02786826.2020.1749229. PMC 7157964. PMID 32308568. S2CID 215784311. Wikidata Q92061782.
