= Toronto Accessibility Task Force on COVID-19 Vaccines =

Toronto committee on vaccine access for people with disabilities

Toronto's Accessibility Task Force on COVID-19 Vaccines is a working committee created by the City of Toronto to reduce barriers to COVID-19 vaccine access for people with disabilities.

It advocates for the needs of people with disabilities and arranges special vaccination events to meet their unique needs.

== History and mandate ==
The task force was launched in March 2021 with a grant of $125,000 in an attempt to improve services to people with disabilities, who have historically been marginalized in the provision of healthcare services.

The task force's mandate is to:

1. advise government about how to address issues of equity in terms of COVID-19 vaccine distribution, with focus on people with disabilities and the people who give them care
2. to disseminate knowledge about
  - risk of COVID-19 infections;
  - ways to reduce the risk of COVID-19; and
  - COVID-19 testing and COVID-19 safety; for people with disabilities
3. to address concerns about the COVID-19 vaccines and barriers that people with disabilities face in accessing it.

== Activities and members ==
Soon after being formed, the task force recommended the immediate prioritization of the provision of COVID-19 vacations to people with disabilities who live in congregate settings or people who received daily care. The task force also recommended that the City of Toronto provide mobile vaccination clinics and priority booking systems for people with disabilities, and recommended working with developmental service agencies and supportive housing organizations.

The task force arranged special vaccination efforts for people with high support needs in November 2021, and January 2022.

Task force members are:

- Wendy Porch, Executive Director, The Centre for Independent Living in Toronto
- Peter Athanasopoulos, Executive Director, The Ontario Spinal Cord Injury Alliance
- Simone Atungo, CEO, Vibrant Healthcare Alliance
- Susan Bisaillon, CEO Safehaven Project for Community Living
- Dr. Laurie Green, Physician, St. Michael's Hospital, Department of Family and Community Medicine
- Megan Henze, occupational therapist, Surrey Place
- Yona Lunsky, Director, Azrieli Adult Neurodevelopmental Centre
- Liviya Mendelsohn, Director of Accessibility and Inclusion, the Miles Nadal Jewish Community Centre; Artistic Director, ReelAbilities Film Festival
- Cathy Samuelson, Executive Director, North Yorkers for Disabled Persons
- Sandy Stemp, COO, Reena
- Laura Visser, CEO, PACE Independent Living

== See also ==
- COVID-19 pandemic in Toronto
- Inclusion (disability rights)
- Ontario COVID-19 Science Advisory Table
