= Laura Rosella =

Canadian epidemiologist

Laura C. A. Rosella
- Education: University of Toronto
- Scientific career
- Workplaces: University of Toronto
- Thesis: A population based approach to diabetes mellitus risk prediction : methodological advances and practical applications. (2009)

Laura C. A. Rosella is a Canadian epidemiologist who is an associate professor at the Dalla Lana School of Public Health in the University of Toronto. She studies public health and the social determinants of health. Rosella holds a Canada Research Chair in Population Health Analytics.

== Early life and education ==
Rosella was an undergraduate student at the University of Toronto, where she majored in health science and epidemiology. She remained at the University for her graduate studies, where she evaluated public health risk in people with diabetes mellitus.

== Research and career ==
Rosella is a professor at the Dalla Lana School of Public Health at the University of Toronto. Rosella is the Scientific Director of the Population Health Analytics Laboratory. She has looked to prevent diabetes, through regular screenings and partnerships with provincial health ministries. She developed DPoRT, a Diabetes Population Risk Tool which identifies the optimum cut offs for health screenings to prevent adverse medical outcomes. At the same time, Rosella investigates how people living with diabetes accumulate chronic conditions. She combines her understanding of social and behavioural risk factor data with an understanding of healthcare utilisation to eliminate persistent health inequalities.

From 2018 to 2022, she served as president of the Canadian Society for Epidemiology and Biostatistics.

In November 2020, Rosella joined the Institute for Better Health as the Stephen Family Research Chair in Community Health. In this capacity she looks to improve public health decision making and promote the equitable distribution of healthcare. Rosella has evaluated the use of machine learning in predicting population health. She found that the majority of machine learning applications only made use of traditional data sources, and rarely used big data.

Rosella served as a member of the Ontario COVID-19 Science Advisory Table as a part of the group's Modelling Consensus Table.

== Awards and honours ==
- 2015 Canadian Society for Epidemiology and Biostatistics Early Career Award
- 2017 Society for Epidemiologic Research Brian MacMahon Early Career Epidemiology Award
- 2018 Canada Top 40 Under 40
- 2020 Connaught Community Project Award for measuring wellbeing
- 2021 Member, The Royal Society of Canada

== Selected publications ==
- Jeffrey C Kwong; Kevin L Schwartz; Campitelli, Michael; et al. (2018). "Acute Myocardial Infarction after Laboratory-Confirmed Influenza Infection". The New England Journal of Medicine. 378 (4): 345–353. doi:10.1056/nejmoa1702090. PMID 29365305. Wikidata Q47549279.
- Danuta M Skowronski; De Serres, Gaston; Crowcroft, Natasha; et al. (2010). "Association between the 2008-09 seasonal influenza vaccine and pandemic H1N1 illness during Spring-Summer 2009: four observational studies from Canada". PLOS Medicine. 7 (4) e1000258. doi:10.1371/journal.pmed.1000258. PMC 2850386. PMID 20386731. Wikidata Q30388012.
- Maria I Creatore; Glazier, Richard; Rahim Moineddin; et al. (2016). "Association of Neighborhood Walkability With Change in Overweight, Obesity, and Diabetes". JAMA. 315 (20): 2211–2220. doi:10.1001/jama.2016.5898. PMID 27218630. Wikidata Q39740655.
