= Samira Mubareka =

Canadian microbiologist (born 1972)

- Education: Dalhousie University (MD); McGill University (Residency); Icahn School of Medicine at Mount Sinai
- Scientific career
- Workplaces: Sunnybrook Health Sciences Centre; University of Toronto
- Website: Lab Website

Samira Mubareka (born 1972) is a Canadian microbiologist who is a clinical scientist at the Sunnybrook Health Sciences Centre in Toronto, Ontario. Her research considers the influenza virus, viral transmission and aerobiology. During the COVID-19 pandemic Mubareka isolated the genome of Severe acute respiratory syndrome coronavirus 2 in an effort to improve detection and diagnostics. She served as a member of the Ontario COVID-19 Science Advisory Table.

== Early life and education ==
Mubareka was born to Kathy Elizabeth Cannon and Aboud Mubareka in Göttingen, Germany. Her father was born in Iraq and attended the University of Baghdad and University of Göttingen. Her mother attended the University of Mainz. She and her family immigrated to northwestern New Brunswick when she was two. Mubareka herself was an undergraduate student at the University of New Brunswick. She eventually studied medicine at Dalhousie University, which she graduated in 1999. She specialised in internal medicine at McGill University, before moving to the University of Manitoba to train in infectious diseases. After completing her registrar training, Mubareka moved to Mount Sinai Hospital where she worked in the laboratory of Peter Palese.

== Research and career ==
Mubareka is a Clinical Scientist at the Sunnybrook Health Sciences Centre in Toronto and on the faculty at the University of Toronto. She works as lead of infectious diseases at the Centre for Research Expertise in Occupational Diseases, and chair of the Royal Society of Canada's Working Group on One Health.

Her research considers the development of mammalian model to describe the transmission of respiratory disease and the influenza virus. She is interested in the co-pathogenesis of Staphylococcus aureus and its role in influenza virus transmission. She looks to apply her understanding of viral transmission to the development of protective strategies. By analysing data from a five-year period in Toronto, Mubareka identified that the virus struggles to survive in more humid environments. Several of Mubareka's publications on viral transmission were edited by American virologist Ralph S. Baric of the University of North Carolina at Chapel Hill.

=== COVID-19 ===
In the early days of the COVID-19 pandemic, Mubareka worked with Sunnybrook Health Sciences Centre to better inform the public about the disease. She created a series of videos that described the biology and symptoms of COVID-19. In mid February 2020 Mubareka was awarded a research grant from the McLaughlin Centre to identify the genome sequence of SARS-CoV-2. Genomic data can help to better diagnose COVID-19, including how much of the virus is shed by people who are infected. Mubareka established the Toronto 2019-nCoV Working Group with Allison McGeer and Robert Kozak. On March 10, 2020, Mubareka participated in the convening of the Chief Science Advisor of Canada's COVID-19 Expert Panel.

By mid March 2020, Mubareka and colleagues had successfully isolated SARS-CoV-2, providing researchers access to the genetic sequence for the development of new therapies and vaccines. The virus was isolated from patients at Sunnybrook Health Sciences Centre, the first hospital in Canada to treat COVID-19 patients. She succeeded in isolating the virus by getting it to reproduce in genetically engineered animal cells, then using whole genome sequencing to deduce the genome. The isolated virus can be used to ensure tests work effectively, as well as being used to analyse the suitability of antiviral drugs.

Mubareka helped the World Health Organization to write guidelines on the clinical management of severe acute respiratory infection with an expectant diagnosis of COVID-19. The guidelines include close monitoring, the provision of oxygen therapy and the determination of chronic therapies and co-infections. She served as a founding member of the Ontario COVID-19 Science Advisory Table upon its creation in July 2020 until its dissolution in September 2022.

=== Selected publications ===
- Lowen, Anice C.; Mubareka, Samira; Steel, John; Palese, Peter (2007). "Influenza Virus Transmission Is Dependent on Relative Humidity and Temperature". PLOS Pathogens. 3 (10): 1470–6. doi:10.1371/journal.ppat.0030151. ISSN 1553-7366. PMC 2034399. PMID 17953482.
- Steel, John; Lowen, Anice C.; Mubareka, Samira; Palese, Peter (2009-01-02). Baric, Ralph S. (ed.). "Transmission of Influenza Virus in a Mammalian Host Is Increased by PB2 Amino Acids 627K or 627E/701N". PLOS Pathogens. 5 (1) e1000252. doi:10.1371/journal.ppat.1000252. ISSN 1553-7374. PMC 2603332. PMID 19119420.
- Lowen, A. C.; Mubareka, S.; Tumpey, T. M.; Garcia-Sastre, A.; Palese, P. (2006-06-27). "The guinea pig as a transmission model for human influenza viruses". Proceedings of the National Academy of Sciences. 103 (26): 9988–9992. Bibcode:2006PNAS..103.9988L. doi:10.1073/pnas.0604157103. ISSN 0027-8424. PMC 1502566. PMID 16785447.
