= Ontario COVID-19 Science Advisory Table =

Canadian health advisory group

- Abbreviation: OST
- Formation: July 2020; 6 years ago
- Dissolved: September 7, 2022; 4 years ago
- Headquarters: Toronto, Ontario
- Co-chairs: Upton Allen; Brian Schwartz; Adalsteinn Brown (former)
- Scientific Director: Fahad Razak; Peter Jüni (former)
- Parent organization: Public Health Ontario; Dalla Lana School of Public Health (former)
- Website: covid19-sciencetable.ca

The Ontario COVID-19 Science Advisory Table, often referred to simply as the Ontario Science Table (OST), was a group of independent scientific experts that provided advice to the Government of Ontario about COVID-19.

It consisted of several specialized research initiatives in addition to the core table, sharing common members, brand imaging, and partner institutions. This extended network included the Evidence Synthesis Network (ESN), the COVID-19 Rapid Evidence Access Link (REAL), and the Modelling Consensus Table (MCT).

The group was initially hosted by the Dalla Lana School of Public Health at the University of Toronto, switching to Public Health Ontario in April 2022. The core table was dissolved as of September 6, 2022, transitioning to a new body called the Ontario Public Health Emergencies Science Advisory Committee (OPHESAC).

== History ==
The Ontario COVID-19 Science Advisory Table was formed in July 2020.

In August 2021, former Assistant Scientific Director Nathan Stall resigned from the table to avoid the perception of a conflict of interest due to his role as the Ontario Liberal Party candidate in the 2022 Ontario general election. David Fisman resigned later the same month, alleging that "grim" COVID-19 projections for the fall of 2021 were being withheld as a result of political pressure.

On March 17, 2022, the table released a report based on data modelling that warned that Ontario would see an increase in COVID-19 cases as a result of loosening of public health restrictions. The report indicated that protection from a third dose of a COVID-19 vaccine had plateaued for all age groups, particularly in marginalized communities, and recommended the continued wearing of masks.

On July 6, 2022, the table stated that Ontario had entered a seventh wave of COVID-19 infections, citing a test positivity rate of over 10% and increased signals from wastewater testing. In their recommendations for the fall 2022 school year, the table declined to make a recommendation on the use of face masks in class due to a lack of consensus among the co-authors of the publication. Instead of weighing in on mandating their use, the table supported an approach that allowed individuals to choose to wear a mask or not.

On August 3, 2022, infectious diseases specialist Upton Allen M.D. replaced Adalsteinn Brown as co-chair of the table.

At a meeting with Public Health Ontario on August 18, it was announced that the table and its working groups were to be dissolved as of September 6, 2022. The table's online Indicator Roadmap dashboard was set for discontinuation on September 8. The Government of Ontario stated that the work conducted by the table would continue under a new mandate, with terms of reference to be announced in early September. On September 1, Public Health Ontario announced the details of the new group and revealed its new name as the Ontario Public Health Emergencies Science Advisory Committee (OPHESAC). The new group was set to be led by fifteen core members, with the focus of their research determined by Public Health Ontario.

Outgoing members of the table expressed opposition to Kieran Moore's September 1 announcement that the province would be dropping its mandatory isolation period for those testing positive for COVID-19, stating that they would have advised against the decision had they been consulted.

== Organization ==
The Ontario COVID-19 Science Advisory Table (OST) was self-described as a group of non-partisan, independent, and volunteer scientific experts that provides advice to the Government of Ontario about the COVID-19 pandemic. Participation on the table is on a volunteer basis, though members of the secretariat and the scientific director are paid by Public Health Ontario and the Dalla Lana School of Public Health.

=== Structure ===
==== Leadership ====
The group was initially hosted by the Dalla Lana School of Public Health at the University of Toronto, with funding support from Public Health Ontario. In April 2022, Public Health Ontario absorbed the table into their external advisory committee structure.

The table was originally co-chaired by Adalsteinn Brown, Dean of the Dalla Lana School of Public Health, and Brian Schwartz, vice-president of Public Health Ontario. Brown was replaced in August 2022 by Upton Allen M.D. The original scientific director of the group was Peter Jüni who indicated his term would end in March 2022. He remained a member of the Modelling Consensus Table and the Drugs & Biologics Working Group.

On April 29, 2022, it was announced that Fahad Razak would take over as the Scientific Director. Razak had previously been serving as a member of the table.

==== Working groups ====
In addition to its core membership, the table consisted of four working groups: Behavioural Science, Congregate Care Setting, Drugs & Biologics Clinical Practice Guidelines, and Mental Health. Each working group was chaired by one or two leading members in their field, and were each supported by a secretariat.

=== Partnerships ===
The group collaborated with a number of other related organizations and tables, including Can-COVID, the Evidence Synthesis Network (ESN), the COVID-19 Rapid Evidence Access Link (REAL) and the in-house Modelling Consensus Table (MCT). A number of these organizations are extensions of the operations of the core OST, with near-identical brand imaging and sharing many members and partner institutions in common. Other arms-length partners include the Ontario COVID-19 Bioethics Table, which has worked closely with the table.

==== Modelling Consensus Table ====
The Ontario COVID-19 Modelling Consensus Table (MCT) is a joint initiative led by the Fields Institute and the University of Toronto, supported by funding from the Ontario Ministry of Health, Ontario Health, and Public Health Ontario. The MCT is chaired by infectious diseases specialist David Earn, and employs epidemiologist John McLaughlin as executive director.

==== Evidence Synthesis Network ====
The Evidence Synthesis Network (ESN) is described as a "collaborative response initiative" developing synthesized research evidence to decision makers in response to the COVID-19 pandemic in Ontario. ESN is co-chaired by Anne Hayes, Director of Ontario's Ministry of Health Research, Analysis and Evaluation Branch, and Rob Reid, Chief Scientist at Trillium Health Partners' Institute for Better Health and Senior Vice President of Science, also at Trillium. Both scientists also serve as members of the table.

Organizations collaborating with the ESN include the Canadian Agency for Drugs and Technologies in Health (CADTH), the University of Toronto's Centre for Effective Practice (CEP), Cochrane Canada, the Dalla Lana School of Public Health, Health Quality Ontario, ICES, Rapid-Improvement Support and Exchange (RISE) (an initiative of McMaster University Health Forum and The Ottawa Hospital), Cancer Care Ontario, the Ontario Hospital Association (OHA), the Ontario Medical Association (OMA), Public Health Ontario, the SPOR Evidence Alliance, the Trillium Health Partners Institute for Better Health and the Government of Ontario.

==== COVID-19 Rapid Evidence Access Link ====
The COVID-19 Rapid Evidence Access Link (REAL) is a research project based at the Dalla Lana School of Public Health. It features an online question-and-answer portal where researchers and the general public can seek high-level information on COVID-19. REAL also provides links to external resources from the Government of Canada, Government of Ontario, City of Toronto, Grand River Hospital, the Royal College of Dental Surgeons of Ontario, the Ontario Dental Association, Niagara Health System, the U.S. Centers for Disease Control and Prevention, the National Institutes of Health, Harvard Medical School, Mental Health Research Canada, the U.K. National Health Service, Royal Life Saving Society Canada and others.

== Notable members ==
- Pat Armstrong
- Bill Cosby
- David Fisman
- Peter Jüni
- John Lavis
- Allison McGeer
- Kwame McKenzie
- Samira Mubareka
- Justin Presseau
- Paula Rochon
- Laura Rosella
- Beate Sander
- Brian Schwartz
- Chris Simpson
- Robert Steiner
- Ashleigh Tuite
- Tania Watts
- Jianhong Wu

== See also ==
- Toronto Accessibility Task Force on COVID-19
