= Pat Armstrong =

Canadian sociologist

- Education: University of Toronto (BA); Carleton University (MA, PhD)
- Spouse: Hugh Armstrong
- Honors: Fellow of the Royal Society of Canada

Pat Armstrong is a Canadian sociologist and Distinguished Research Professor at York University. She is a Fellow of the Royal Society of Canada. Armstrong has served as a chair for the Canadian Institutes of Health Research in Health Services and Nursing Research and the Department of Sociology at York University.

== Career ==
In 2007, Armstrong was awarded the Ontario Health Coalition's Ethel Meade Award for Excellence in Research in the Public Interest.

While at York University, Armstrong served as Chair of the Department of Sociology. She also helped found the National Network on Environments and Women's Health, where she served as its director, before earning the title of Chair of Women and Health Care Reform. She also worked as a chair for the Canadian Health Services Research Foundation/Canadian Institutes of Health Research in Health Services and Nursing Research and as a Research Associate for the Canadian Centre for Policy Alternatives. In 2010, Armstrong was named a York University Distinguished Research Professor and in 2011 was elected as a Fellow of the Royal Society of Canada.

In 2017, Armstrong was awarded York University's Faculty of Graduate Studies Postdoctoral Supervisor of the Year Award. As a Distinguished Research Professor, Armstrong helped begin a project called "Re-imagining Long-Term Residential Care: An International Study of Promising Practices" which searched for solutions to problems residents and care providers faced in long-term care. The Social Sciences and Humanities Research Council of Canada's Major Collaborative Research Initiatives program granted the research group $2.5 million in funding. The following year she was a recipient of the YWCA Toronto Women of Distinction.

Armstrong is a member of the board for the Canadian Health Coalition, an organization working with the Government of Canada to increase funding for socialized health care in the country.

=== COVID-19 ===
Armstrong sits on the Congregate Care Setting Working Group of the Ontario COVID-19 Science Advisory Table. She received a research grant from the Social Sciences and Humanities Research Council to study the impacts of the COVID-19 pandemic on long-term care facilities, in order to identify promising practices for family engagement that balances safety and the joy and well-being of residents and their families.

== Publications ==
List of publications:

- Wash, wear, and care: clothing and laundry in long-residential care (2017)
- Women's health: intersections of policy, research, and practice (2015)
- Troubling Care: Critical Perspectives on Research and Practices (2013)
- Thinking Women and Health Care Reform in Canada (2012)
- The Double Ghetto: Canadian Women and Their Segregated Work (2010)
- Wasting Away: The Undermining of Canadian Health Care (2010)
- A Place to Call Home: Long Term Care in Canada (2009)
- They Deserve Better: The long-term care experience in Canada and Scandinavia (2009)
- About Canada: Health Care (2008)
- Critical to Care; The Invisible Women in Health Services (2008)
- Women’s Health: Intersections of Policy, Research, and Practice (2008)
- Caring For/Caring About. Women, Home Care and Unpaid Caregiving (2007)
- Studies in Political Economy: Developments in Feminism (2003)
- Exposing Privatization: Women and Health Care Reform (2002)
- Wasting Away: The Undermining of Canadian Health Care (2002)
- Unhealthy Times: Political Economy Perspectives on Health and Care in Canada (2001)
- “Heal Thyself”: Managing Health Care Reform (2000)
- Feminism, Political Economy and the State: Contested Terrain (1999)
- World Class Cities: Can Canada Play? (1999)
- Universal Health Care. What the United States Can Learn From the Canadian Experience (1998)
- Medical alert: new work organizations in health care (1997)
- Wasting Away: The Undermining of Canadian Health Care (1996)
- Take Care: Warning Signals for Canadian Health Care (1994)
- The Double Ghetto: Canadian Women and Their Segregated Work (1994)
- Vital Signs: Nursing Work in Transition (1993)
- Feminism in Action: Studies in Political Economy (1992)
- Theorizing women's work (1990)
- Labour Pains: Women's Work in Crisis (1984)
- A Working Majority: What Women Must Do for Pay (1983)

== Personal life ==
Armstrong is married to Dr. Hugh Armstrong, a professor at Carleton University.
