= Ing Wong-Ward =

Canadian disability rights advocate and broadcaster

- Born: Ing Min Wong; 15 June 1973; Vancouver, British Columbia, Canada
- Died: 6 July 2019 (aged 46); Toronto, Ontario, Canada
- Education: Ryerson University
- Occupations: Advocate for the disabled, journalist, public broadcaster, TV and radio producer
- Spouse: Tim Wong-Ward
- Awards: City of Toronto Human Rights Access Award, 2004

Chinese name
- Chinese: 黃英
Transcriptions
Standard Mandarin
- Hanyu Pinyin: Huáng Yīng
Yue: Cantonese
- Jyutping: wong4 jing1
Southern Min
- Hokkien POJ: Hông Eng

Ing Min Wong-Ward (15 June 1973 - 6 July 2019) was a Canadian disability rights advocate, journalist, and Canadian Broadcasting Corporation (CBC) television and radio producer.

== Early life and education ==
Ing Min Wong was born in Vancouver, to parents John and King Wong. Her parents were from China and Singapore respectively and had met as international students while at the University of British Columbia. Wong was born with spinal muscular atrophy, though this went undiagnosed until she was a toddler. She used a motorized wheelchair since age three. Wong attended City School and the Ontario Science Centre Science School.

Wong initially wanted to become an author, but at age 13, she decided to pursue a career as a journalist, after a classmate entered a magazine writing contest with Wong as the subject. While her friend won $3,000 and a summer camp excursion, Wong felt dissatisfied with the magazine's description of her disability as helpless and dependent on others. She graduated from the Ryerson School of Journalism in 1993. As she was unable to enter the maain building, her classes were held at the on-campus Jorgenson Hall.

== Career ==
Wong joined the Canadian Broadcasting Corporation in 1993 as a clerk in the human resources department. In her 23-year long career with the public broadcaster, she held various positions including researcher, producer, and host. In television, she hosted the CBC program The Disability Network, and worked behind the scenes on the programs Newsworld and The National. She also worked for CBC Radio, primarily in Toronto, where she produced Metro Morning, Here & Now and Fresh Air. She was a member of the Canadian Media Guild.

In late 2015, Wong-Ward left CBC to become the assistant director at the Centre for Independent Living in Toronto.

== Personal life ==
Wong met her husband, Tim, while studying at Ryerson, where he was a photography student. They married on 22 August 1998 and in April 2008, the couple had a daughter. The pregnancy was documented on Sounds Like Canada. Wong-Ward, her husband, and her daughter lived in Toronto.

In 2017, Wong-Ward was diagnosed with inoperable colon cancer. She initially considered palliative sedation, but later chose to live out her life in palliative care with her family. She died from colon cancer in 2019, at the age of 46.

== Awards ==
- Gabriel Award for radio broadcasting.
- 2004, the City of Toronto Human Rights Access Award.
- 2019, posthumously, the 2018-2019 Founders Award, Centre for Independent Living.
