= John McGeer House =

Historic house in New York, United States

- U.S. National Register of Historic Places
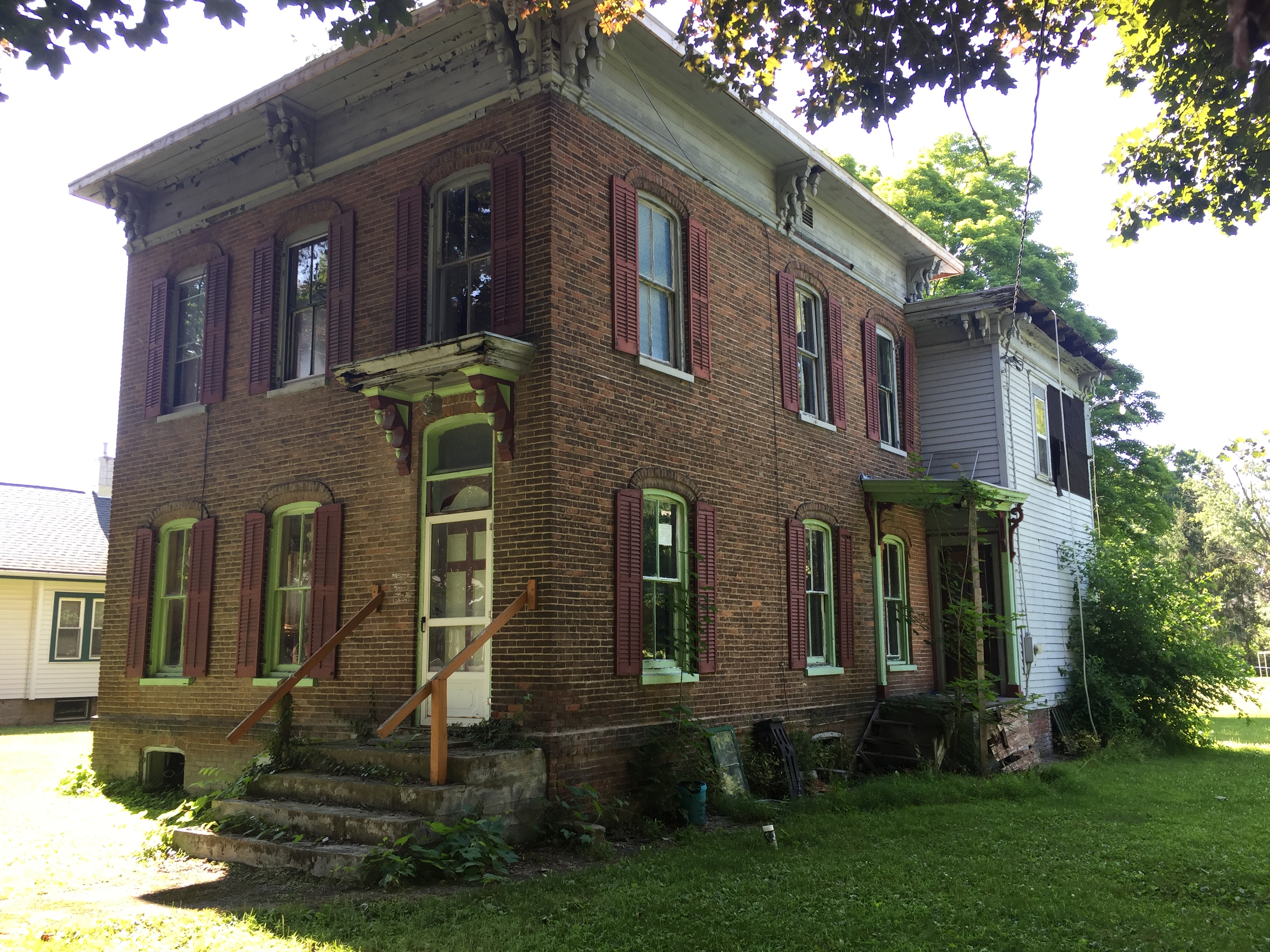

- Location within New York Location within the United States
- Location: 7 Aurora St., Moravia, New York
- Coordinates: 42.71041°N 76.42238°W
- Area: less than one acre
- Built: 1871
- Architectural style: Italianate
- MPS: Moravia MPS
- NRHP reference No.: 95000056
- Added to NRHP: February 24, 1995

John McGeer House is a historic home located at 7 Aurora Street in the village of Moravia in Cayuga County, New York. It is a two-story, brick, Italianate style residence, with a rear wing of frame construction. The house was built in 1871. Also on the property is a frame wagon shop, built or expanded to its present form in about 1884.

It was listed on the National Register of Historic Places in 1995.

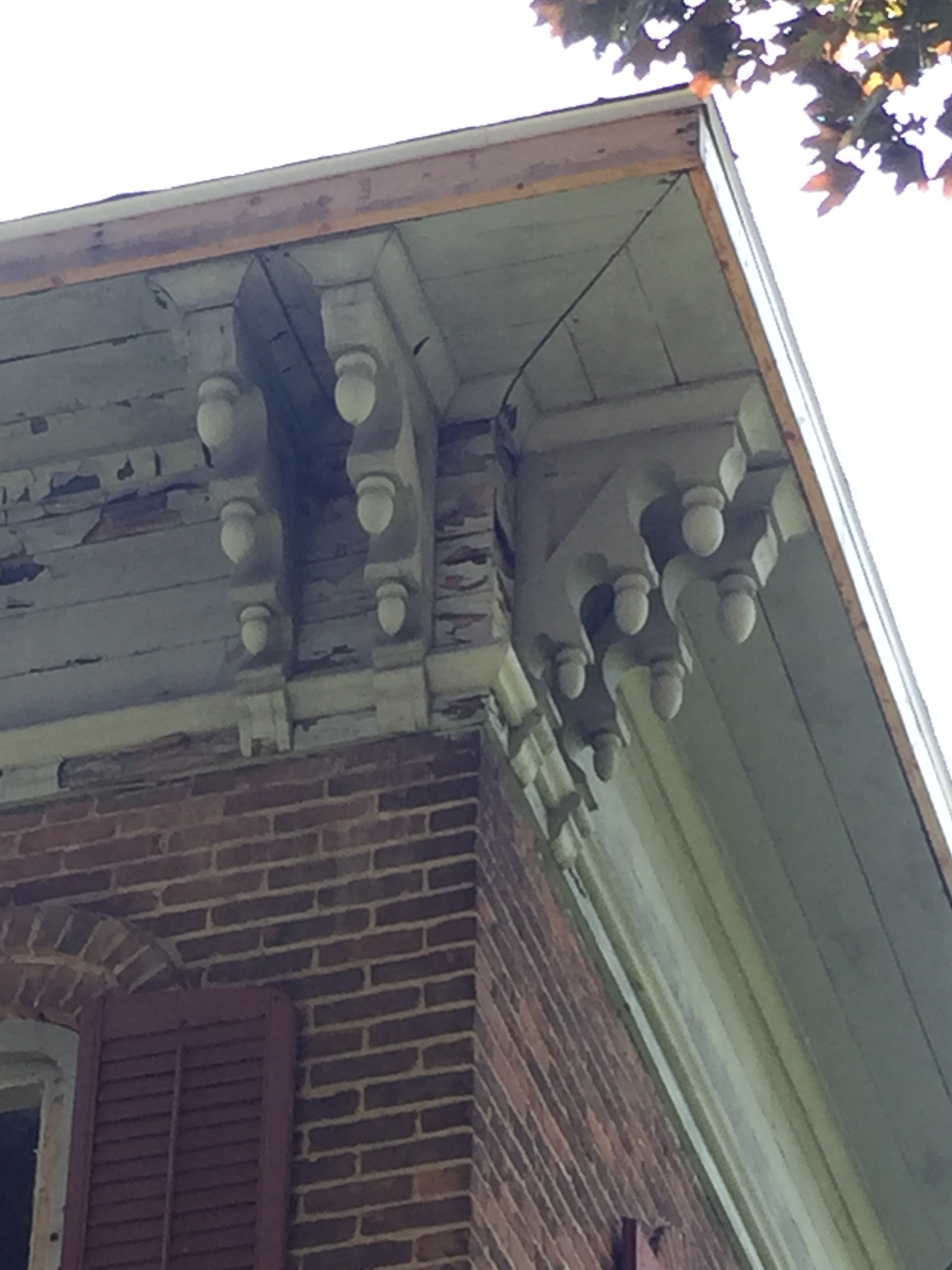
Detail of brackets

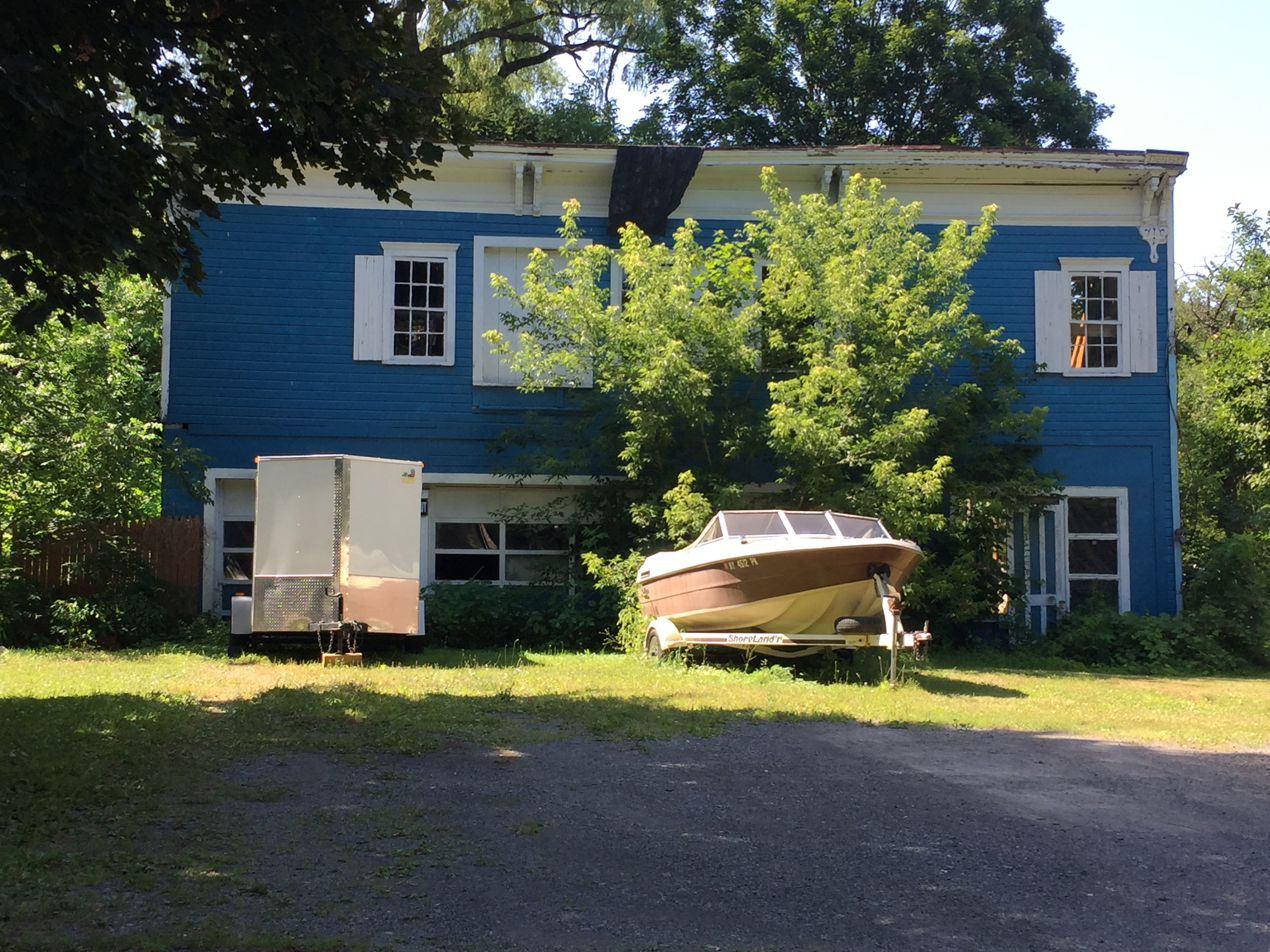
Wagon shop building
