= Peter Palese =

American microbiologist and virologist

- Born: 15 April 1944 (age 82)
- Education: University of Vienna
- Awards: Member of the National Academy of Sciences (2000); Robert Koch Prize (2006); European Virology Award (2010); Member of the National Academy of Medicine (2012); Lifetime Achievement Award for Scientific Contributions, Institute of Human Virology (2017)
- Scientific career
- Fields: Microbiology; Virology
- Workplaces: Icahn School of Medicine at Mount Sinai
- Doctoral advisor: Hans Tuppy
- Doctoral students: Vincent Racaniello

Peter Palese is a United States microbiologist, researcher, inventor and the Horace W. Goldsmith Professor in the Department of Microbiology at the Icahn School of Medicine at Mount Sinai in New York City, and an expert in the field of RNA viruses.

Palese is the author of multiple book chapters and more than 500 scientific publications. He is also on the editorial board for Proceedings of the National Academy of Sciences of the United States of America (PNAS). He has been awarded multiple patents on viral vaccines and antivirals.

== Biography ==
His primary schooling consisted of Greek and Latin and very little modern science. He later developed his interest in science at the University of Vienna, where he received his Ph.D. in chemistry in 1969 and his M.S. in pharmacy in 1970. He was a postdoctoral fellow at the Roche Institute of Molecular Biology from 1970 until 1971 when he joined the Department of Microbiology at the Icahn School of Medicine at Mount Sinai as an assistant professor.

== Research ==
Palese's research covers RNA-containing viruses with a particular focus on influenza viruses/vaccines.

He built "the first genetic maps for influenza A, B and C viruses, identified the function of several viral genes, defined the mechanism of neuraminidase inhibitors (which are now FDA-approved antivirals) and "pioneered the field of reverse genetics for negative-strand RNA viruses". Furtherance of this technique has been used by Palese and his colleagues in reconstructing and studying the pathogenicity of the extinct but deadly 1918 pandemic influenza virus. Reverse genetics is also instrumental in developing new influenza viruses/vaccines.

When viruses infect cells, they respond with antiviral interferons -- Palese and Adolfo García-Sastre showed that most negative-strand RNA viruses counteract that antiviral response with protein antagonists to interferons. His work on "fundamental questions concerning the genetic make-up and biology of viruses" and virus-host interactions "uses molecular biological techniques to understand how viruses replicate and how they interact with cells to cause disease in their hosts", with emphasis on "the study of RNA viruses, including influenza, paramyxo and corona (SARS) viruses". He developed a new animal model (the guinea pig) for studying the transmission of influenza viruses. Palese has been involved in developing novel vaccines against influenza viruses, including SARS-CoV-2. Several of these vaccine approaches have been in human trials. Also, an anti-cancer vaccine based on a Newcastle disease virus vector has been tested in humans.

As of 2022, Palese and his team are working on creating a universal influenza virus vaccine, and SARS-CoV-2, specifically for low and middle-income countries.

=== Patents ===
Palese is named on 73 patents on Pubchem. As of 2023, recent patents include:

NAME	DATE GRANTED	PATENT NUMBER
Anti-Influenza B Virus Neuraminidase Antibodies And Uses Thereof	02/22/2022	11,254,733
Influenza Virus Hemagglutinin Proteins And Uses Thereof	03/08/2022	11,266,734
Influenza Virus Vaccination Regimens	08/11/2020	10,736,956
Influenza Virus Vaccines And Uses Thereof	03/10/2020	10,583,188
Antibodies Against Influenza Virus Hemagglutinin And Uses Thereof	01/28/2020	10,544,207

== Memberships, honors and awards ==
Palese is a member of the National Academy of Sciences (2000), the National Academy of Medicine (IOM) (2012), the Austrian Academy of Sciences (2002) and the German Academy of Sciences Leopoldina (2006). In 2014, he was elected Fellow of the American Academy of Arts and Sciences, and the National Academy of Inventors. He has served the presidencies of the Harvey Society from 2003 to 2004 and the American Society of Virology from 2005 to 2006. He received honorary doctorates from the Icahn School of Medicine at Mount Sinai (2006), Baylor College of Medicine (2014), and McMaster University (2016).

- Robert Koch Prize (2006).
- Charles C. Shepard Science Award (2006 and 2008).
- Wilhelm Exner Medal (2007).
- European Virology Award (EVA) (2010).
- Sanofi – Institut Pasteur Award (2012).
- Beijerinck Virology Prize from the Royal Netherlands Academy of Arts and Sciences (2015).
- Maurice Hilleman/Merck Award from American Society for Microbiology (2016).
- Lifetime Achievement Award for Scientific Contributions, Institute of Human Virology, University of Maryland School of Medicine (2017)
- Drexel Prize in Translational Medicine (2017)

== Publications ==
=== Books and chapters ===
- Palese, P., Roizman, B., eds. Genetic Variation of Viruses. New York: The New York Academy of Sciences; 1980. ISBN 0897660986
- Palese, P., Kingsbury, D.W., eds. Genetics of Influenza Viruses. New York: Springer-Verlag; 1983. ISBN 978-3-7091-8706-7, 978-3-7091-8708-1
- Palese, P., Roizman, B., eds. Genetic Engineering of Viruses and Viral Vectors. Washington, D.C.: National Academy of Sciences; 1997.
- Basler, C., Palese, P. Modulation of Innate Immunity by Filoviruses. In: Klenk, H., Feldmann, H., eds. Ebola and Marburg Viruses, Molecular and Cellular Biology. Chap 11. Abingdon, Oxfordshire, UK: BIOS Scientific Publishers; 2004:305-50. ISBN 0954523237
- Palese, P., ed. Modulation of Host Gene Expression and Innate Immunity by Viruses. The Netherlands: Springer; 2005. ISBN 1402032412
- Taubenberger, J.K., Palese, P. The Origin and Virulence of the 1918 Spanish Influenza Virus. In: Kawaoka, Y., ed. Influenza Virology Current Topics. Wymondham, UK: Caister Academic Press; 2006. ISBN 978-1-904455-06-6
- Shaw, M.L. and Palese, P. Orthomyxoviruses: Molecular Biology. In: Mahy, B.W.J. and Van Regenmortel, M.H.V., eds. Encyclopedia of Virology, 3rd ed. Oxford: Elsevier; 2008:483-489. ISBN 0123739357
- Hayden, F.G., Palese, P. Influenza Virus. In: Richman, D.D., Whitley, R.J., Hayden, F.G., eds. Clinical Virology. 3rd ed. Washington, DC: ASM Press; 2009:943-976. ISBN 978-1-683-67407-8
- Kopecky-Bromberg, S.A., Palese, P. Recombinant Vectors as Influenza Vaccines. In: Compans, R.W., Orenstein, W.A., eds. Vaccines for Pandemic Influenza. Springer-Verlag, Berlin Heidelberg; 2009:243-268. ISBN 978-3-540-92164-6
- Pica, N., Palese, P. and Steel, J. Live Attenuated Influenza Virus Vaccines: NS1 Truncation as an Approach to Virus Attenuation. In: Dormitzer, P.R., Mandl, C.W. and Rappuoli, R., eds. Replicating Vaccines. Basel: Springer; 2011:195-221. ISBN 3034602766
- Pica, N. and Palese, P. Toward a Universal Influenza Virus Vaccine: Prospects and Challenges. In: Annual Review of Medicine. 2013:15-28.
- Palese, P. Influenza and Its Viruses. In: Engleberg, N.C., DiRita, V., Dermody, T.S., eds. Schaechter's Mechanisms of Microbial Disease, 5th ed. Philadelphia: Lippincott Williams & Wilkins, 2013: chapter 36. ISBN 978-0-7817-8744-4
- Krammer, F. and Palese, P. Orthomyxoviridae: The Viruses and their Replication. In: Knipe, D.M., Howley, P.M. et al., eds. Fields Virology, 7th ed. Philadelphia: Wolters Kluwer; 2021. ISBN 978-1-9751-1254-7

=== Articles ===
According to Scinapse, as of 2023, Palese has an h-Index of 123, 506 publications and 52,000 citations.

Partial list of peer-reviewed articles:

- Palese, P. (1977). "The genes of influenza virus". Cell. 10 (1): 1–10. doi:10.1016/0092-8674(77)90133-7. PMID 837439. S2CID 6562438.
- Buonagurio, D. A.; Nakada, S.; Parvin, J. D.; Krystal, M.; Palese, P.; Fitch, W. M. (1986). "Evolution of human influenza a viruses over 50 years: Rapid, uniform rate of change in NS gene". Science. 232 (4753): 980–982. Bibcode:1986Sci...232..980B. doi:10.1126/science.2939560. PMID 2939560.
- Luytjes, W.; Krystal, M.; Enami, M.; Parvin, J. D.; Palese, P. (1989). "Amplification, expression, and packaging of foreign gene by influenza virus". Cell. 59 (6): 1107–1113. doi:10.1016/0092-8674(89)90766-6. PMID 2598262. S2CID 251545.
- Enami, M.; Luytjes, W.; Krystal, M.; Palese, P. (1990). "Introduction of site-specific mutations into the genome of influenza virus". Proceedings of the National Academy of Sciences of the United States of America. 87 (10): 3802–3805. Bibcode:1990PNAS...87.3802E. doi:10.1073/pnas.87.10.3802. PMC 53991. PMID 2339122.
- Fitch, W. M.; Leiter, J. M.; Li, X. Q.; Palese, P. (1991). "Positive Darwinian evolution in human influenza a viruses". Proceedings of the National Academy of Sciences of the United States of America. 88 (10): 4270–4274. Bibcode:1991PNAS...88.4270F. doi:10.1073/pnas.88.10.4270. PMC 51640. PMID 1840695.
- García-Sastre, A.; Egorov, A.; Matassov, D.; Brandt, S.; Levy, D. E.; Durbin, J. E.; Palese, P.; Muster, T. (1998). "Influenza a virus lacking the NS1 gene replicates in interferon-deficient systems". Virology. 252 (2): 324–330. doi:10.1006/viro.1998.9508. PMID 9878611.
- Fodor, E.; Devenish, L.; Engelhardt, O. G.; Palese, P.; Brownlee, G. G.; García-Sastre, A. (1999). "Rescue of Influenza a Virus from Recombinant DNA". Journal of Virology. 73 (11): 9679–9682. doi:10.1128/JVI.73.11.9679-9682.1999. PMC 113010. PMID 10516084.
- Talon, J.; Salvatore, M.; O'Neill, R. E.; Nakaya, Y.; Zheng, H.; Muster, T.; García-Sastre, A.; Palese, P. (2000). "Influenza a and B viruses expressing altered NS1 proteins: A vaccine approach". Proceedings of the National Academy of Sciences. 97 (8): 4309–4314. Bibcode:2000PNAS...97.4309T. doi:10.1073/pnas.070525997. PMC 18238. PMID 10725408.
- Tumpey, T. M.; Basler, C. F.; Aguilar, P. V.; Zeng, H.; Solórzano, A.; Swayne, D. E.; Cox, N. J.; Katz, J. M.; Taubenberger, J. K.; Palese, P.; García-Sastre, A. (2005). "Characterization of the Reconstructed 1918 Spanish Influenza Pandemic Virus". Science. 310 (5745): 77–80. Bibcode:2005Sci...310...77T. doi:10.1126/science.1119392. PMID 16210530. S2CID 14773861.
- Lowen, A. C.; Mubareka, S.; Tumpey, T. M.; García-Sastre, A.; Palese, P. (2006). "The guinea pig as a transmission model for human influenza viruses". Proceedings of the National Academy of Sciences. 103 (26): 9988–9992. Bibcode:2006PNAS..103.9988L. doi:10.1073/pnas.0604157103. PMC 1502566. PMID 16785447.
- Zamarin, D.; Ortigoza, M. B.; Palese, P. (2006). "Influenza a Virus PB1-F2 Protein Contributes to Viral Pathogenesis in Mice". Journal of Virology. 80 (16): 7976–7983. doi:10.1128/JVI.00415-06. PMC 1563817. PMID 16873254.
- König, R.; Stertz, S.; Zhou, Y.; Inoue, A.; Hoffmann, H. -H.; Bhattacharyya, S.; Alamares, J. G.; Tscherne, D. M.; Ortigoza, M. B.; Liang, Y.; Gao, Q.; Andrews, S. E.; Bandyopadhyay, S.; De Jesus, P.; Tu, B. P.; Pache, L.; Shih, C.; Orth, A.; Bonamy, G.; Miraglia, L.; Ideker, T.; García-Sastre, A.; Young, J. A. T.; Palese, P.; Shaw, M. L.; Chanda, S. K. (2010). "Human Host Factors Required for Influenza Virus Replication". Nature. 463 (7282): 813–817. Bibcode:2010Natur.463..813K. doi:10.1038/nature08699. PMC 2862546. PMID 20027183.
- Wang, T. T.; Tan, G. S.; Hai, R.; Pica, N.; Petersen, E.; Moran, T. M.; Palese, P. (2010). m. Fouchier, Ron A. (ed.). "Broadly Protective Monoclonal Antibodies against H3 Influenza Viruses following Sequential Immunization with Different Hemagglutinins". PLOS Pathogens. 6 (2) e1000796. doi:10.1371/journal.ppat.1000796. PMC 2829068. PMID 20195520.
- Steel, J.; Lowen, A. C.; Wang, T. T.; Yondola, M.; Gao, Q.; Haye, K.; Garcia-Sastre, A.; Palese, P. (2010). "Influenza Virus Vaccine Based on the Conserved Hemagglutinin Stalk Domain". mBio. 1 (1): e00018–e00010. doi:10.1128/mBio.00018-10. PMC 2912658. PMID 20689752.
- Wang, T. T.; Tan, G. S.; Hai, R.; Pica, N.; Ngai, L.; Ekiert, D. C.; Wilson, I. A.; Garcia-Sastre, A.; Moran, T. M.; Palese, P. (2010). "Vaccination with a synthetic peptide from the influenza virus hemagglutinin provides protection against distinct viral subtypes". Proceedings of the National Academy of Sciences. 107 (44): 18979–18984. Bibcode:2010PNAS..10718979W. doi:10.1073/pnas.1013387107. PMC 2973924. PMID 20956293.
- Palese, P. (2012). "Don't censor life-saving science". Nature. 481 (7380): 115. Bibcode:2012Natur.481..115P. doi:10.1038/481115a. PMID 22237069.
