= Centre for Independent Living in Toronto =

Toronto disability charity

- Formation: 1984
- Headquarters: Toronto
- Executive Director: Wendy Porch
- Website: https://www.cilt.ca/

The Centre for Independent Living in Toronto (CILT) is a not for profit organization that supports people with disabilities and addictions. In 1993, CILT advocated to the Government of Ontario for financial support. The aim was to provide support to people with disabilities to pay for their own home care. By 2012, their advocacy succeeded and they were given responsibility for administering such a system. In the early 21st century CILT advocated against ableism and for better support for people with disabilities and improved access to COVID-19 vaccines.

== History and activities ==
CILT was founded in 1984.

In 1993, CILT Executive Director Vic Willey advocated that governments provide funding needed for home care services to people with disabilities.

In 2012, CILT started managing a $1.7 million per annum government-funded program called the Self-Managed Attendance Program. The program initiated a new way of support people with disabilities by giving them the funds needed to hire home care.

CILT hosts the Parenting with a Disability Network.

In 2019, CILT co-sponsored a campaign to draw attention to the way in which people with disabilities are excluded from common activities.

In 2021, CILT's executive director became the inaugural chair of the Toronto Accessibility Task Force on COVID-19.

CILT's paper "CILT: Empowerment and Independent Living" is cited in Dustin Gale's 2018 book Working Towards Equity Disability Rights Activism and Employment in Late Twentieth-century Canada.

== People ==
- Wendy Porch, executive director
- Ian Parker, senior adviser
- Sandra Carpenter, former executive director
- Ing Wong-Ward, former associate director
- Vic Willey, former executive director
