= Maurizio Cecconi =

Italian anesthesiologist and academic

Maurizio Cecconi OMRI, FRCA, FFICM', (Note: Fellow of the Faculty of Intensive Care Medicine)
- Born: December 27, 1977 (age 48); Gonars, Province of Udine, Friuli, Italy
- Education: St George’s University of London (2006-2010), Harvard Medical School (2014-2015), (Note: Global Clinical Scholar Research Training Program) Universidad Autonoma de Madrid (2001), (Note: He was awarded Erasmus scholarship) University of Udine(1996-2002, 2002-2006)
- Occupations: Anesthesiologist, intensivist, academic
- Medical career
- Profession: Professor and Chair of the Department of Anesthesia and Intensive Care Units (at Humanitas Research Hospital), Vice President of the joint Medicine-Bioengineering degree (at Humanitas University)
- Institutions: Humanitas Research Hospital in Milan, European Society of Intensive Care Medicine (ESICM), St George's Hospital in London (former NHS consultant)
- Awards: The Honorary Citizenship of Gonars, The Gastein Health Forum European Health Leadership Award (2021) (Note: As the president of ESICM)
- Awards: Silver Griffin from the University of Udine (2018)

Academic background
- Thesis: ICS Research Gold Medal Abstract Presentations: Evaluation of Novel Methods of Cardiac Output Monitoring in Critically Ill Patients (2007)

Academic work
- Discipline: Intensive care medicine, anesthesiology
- Sub-discipline: Life support, Organ dysfunction, Respiratory failure, Multiple organ dysfunction syndrome
- Institutions: Humanitas University (Milan)
- Main interests: Haemodynamic monitoring, haemodynamic optimisation, physiology of the critically ill patient, perioperative care, the physiology of shock, acute respiratory failure, sepsis, effects of balanced crystalloids on renal failure and mortality of critically ill patients, venous return

Maurizio Cecconi Cavaliere OMRI FRCA FFICM is a British-Italian anesthesiologist, intensivist, and academic. Cecconi's research focuses on improving the outcomes of high risk surgical patients, especially with better risk identification and perioperative haemodynamic optimisation, and improving the outcome of critically ill patients, especially suffering from cardiovascular shock, acute respiratory failure and sepsis. He has been Clinical Director of Adult Critical Care at St George's and the Clinical Lead for critical care at Epsom and St Helier's hospital from 2015 to 2016. He was President of the European Society of Intensive Care Medicine (ESICM) from 2020 to 2022 throughout the COVID-19 pandemic. Cecconi has been the Head of the Department and Full Professor of Anaesthesia and Intensive Care at Humanitas Research Hospital and Humanitas University since 2018.

== Biography ==
Cecconi attended the Scientific High School G. Marinelli in Udine. Cecconi graduated from the University of Udine in 2002. He won a grant from the Italian Society of Anaesthesia, Analgesia and Intensive Care (SIAARTI) and became a visiting fellow at St George's Hospital. At St George, Cecconi studied perioperative haemodynamic optimisation of the high risk surgical patient. He studied the evaluation of novel techniques for measuring cardiac output in critically ill patients, and in 2007 he got his Doctor of Medicine from the University of London. Cecconi got a scholarship to study for a semester at the Autonomous University of Madrid in 2001. He completed his research studies with a research programme GCSRT at Harvard Medical School in 2015.

In 2008, Cecconi worked as a consultant for the NHS and became one of the youngest NHS consultants.

In 2011, Cecconi became the Research Lead for the Adult Critical Care Directorate at St. George's University Hospitals in London, and then became its Clinical Director in 2016.

In 2016, Cecconi became the Clinical Director of Adult Critical Care at St George's Hospital in London and the Clinical Lead for critical care at Epsom and St Helier's hospital.

In February 2018, and after 13 years in the UK, Cecconi returned to Italy to work for Humanitas.

In a 2018 interview with Il Giorno, Cecconi said he returned to Italy to work at Humanitas due to its alignment with his vision of medicine combining clinical work and research. He is known for advocating a vision of anesthesia and intensive care that emphasizes the importance of research and patient outcomes.

Cecconi said that his focus is on optimizing critically ill patients and high-risk surgical patients with tailored protocols. In another 2018 interview to a local publication, he said:

This means maintaining homeostasis in terms of pressure, oxygen transport, and cardiac output during and after the first few hours of surgery," he explained. "This practice has been shown to reduce the risk and postoperative complications and hospital stays. It improves the quality of hospitalizations and makes hospitals more efficient. Saint George's Hospital has always been a pioneer in this field, and I was able to do my research doctorate with them.

=== COVID-19 ===
The outbreak began on February 20 when a man in his 30s was admitted to Codogno Hospital, leading to 36 COVID-19 cases in less than 24 hours. Italy had reported 13,882 cases with 803 deaths at that time. ICU resources in Lombardy were quickly overwhelmed. Before the outbreak, there were 720 ICU beds (5% of total beds). Within days, they increased to 130 COVID-19 ICU beds, and by March 7, there were 482. ICU admissions represented 12% of positive cases, much higher than China's 5%, likely due to different admission criteria. The death rate increased with age, ranging from under 1% for those under 59 to 16.6% for those aged 80–89. Model forecasts projected a potential dramatic increase in cases, with ICU capacity exceeding soon. At the time, Cecconi advised countries without major outbreaks to focus on training staff to handle highly contagious patients and to prioritize evidence-based treatment and supportive care. He also discouraged untested approaches that could harm patients, emphasizing the importance of evidence-based care.

In March 2020, the Lombardy region in Italy faced a severe strain on its medical system due to the rapid outbreak of COVID-19. On 5 March, Cecconi sent a letter with Pesenti, Grasselli and Kesecioglu to describe the first 10 days of the COVID19 outbreak in Italy and to tell colleagues around the world to "get ready". Cecconi spoke about the situation during a JAMA live stream interview on 13 March. The live stream reached 500,000 viewers. On 28 March he organised an 8-hour COVID-19 online marathon which connected thousands of clinicians worldwide to be updated about the virus, how to control its spread and how to treat infected patients.

In June 2020, Cecconi warned that lockdown restrictions might return in the event of a second wave of COVID-19. In an interview with the Guardian, he emphasized the need to "learn how to live" with the virus until a vaccine became widely available and expressed optimism about European health authorities' efforts to monitor the virus. Cecconi criticized the British government for not implementing lockdown measures sooner, pointing to the herd immunity strategy as a "dangerous approach."

In 2020, Cecconi was awarded the Knight of the Order of the Merit of the Italian Republic by president Sergio Mattarella for his service "to the community during the coronavirus emergency". During the same year, JAMA named Cecconi as one of the most influential doctors of the COVID-19 pandemic alongside other notable figures like Li Wenliang and Anthony Fauci. Cecconi emphasized the importance of collaboration and sharing of information among medical professionals to better prepare for future crises. During the time of his presidency over the European Society of Intensive Care Medicine (ESICM), the organization won the Gastein Health Forum European Health Leadership Award in 2021. As of September 2023, he is the chair of Editorial and Publishing Committee at ESICM.

In June 2021, Cecconi received an Honorary Citizenship of Gonars.

=== Post-pandemic ===
In December 2022, Cecconi wrote an opinion piece for Corriere della Sera in which he highlighted that the previous few years revealed critical issues like antibiotic resistance and the need to rethink intensive care services. Antibiotic resistance, exacerbated by misuse, was a pre-existing problem, causing millions of deaths globally and during the pandemic, some people incorrectly used antibiotics for viral infections. Cecconi said that healthcare systems needed to integrate with the community for vaccination campaigns and public awareness initiatives to detect early symptoms, reducing the reliance on intensive care. He also emphasized the role of Hera, the Authority for Preparedness and Response to Health Emergencies, and EPIC-IG, an interest group on intensive medicine in the European Parliament.

In June 2023, Cecconi co-wrote an opinion piece with Sirpa Pietikäinen for Lapin Kansa. (Note: a Finnish newspaper based in Rovaniemi) They expressed their concerns regarding the recent studies showing over 70 percent of all antimicrobial drugs worldwide being given to animals that are raised for food consumption.

== Bibliography ==
=== Editing ===
- Duška, F., Al-Haddad, M., & Cecconi, M. (Eds.). (2023). Intensive Care Fundamentals: Practically Oriented Essential Knowledge for Newcomers to ICUs. Springer Nature. ISBN 9783031219917

=== Select publications ===
- Evans, L., Rhodes, A., Alhazzani, W., Antonelli, M., Coopersmith, C. M., French, C., ... & Levy, M. (2021). Surviving sepsis campaign: international guidelines for management of sepsis and septic shock 2021. Intensive care medicine, 47(11), 1181–1247. doi:10.1007/s00134-021-06506-y
- Grasselli, G., Zangrillo, A., Zanella, A., Antonelli, M., Cabrini, L., Castelli, A., ... & Zoia, E. (2020). Baseline characteristics and outcomes of 1591 patients infected with SARS-CoV-2 admitted to ICUs of the Lombardy Region, Italy. Jama, 323(16), 1574–1581. doi:10.1001/jama.2020.5394
- Alhazzani, W., Møller, M. H., Arabi, Y. M., Loeb, M., Gong, M. N., Fan, E., ... & Rhodes, A. (2020). Surviving Sepsis Campaign: guidelines on the management of critically ill adults with Coronavirus Disease 2019 (COVID-19). Intensive care medicine, 46(5), 854–887. doi:10.1007/s00134-020-06022-5
- Lodigiani, C., Iapichino, G., Carenzo, L., Cecconi, M., Ferrazzi, P., Sebastian, T., ... & Force, T. (2020). Venous and arterial thromboembolic complications in COVID-19 patients admitted to an academic hospital in Milan, Italy. Thrombosis research, 191, 9–14. doi:10.1016/j.thromres.2020.04.024
- Grasselli, G., Pesenti, A., & Cecconi, M. (2020). Critical care utilization for the COVID-19 outbreak in Lombardy, Italy: early experience and forecast during an emergency response. Jama, 323(16), 1545–1546. doi:10.1001/jama.2020.4031
- Cecconi, M., Evans, L., Levy, M., & Rhodes, A. (2018). Sepsis and septic shock. The Lancet, 392(10141), 75–87. doi:10.1016/S0140-6736(18)30696-2
- Cecconi, M., De Backer, D., Antonelli, M., Beale, R., Bakker, J., Hofer, C., ... & Rhodes, A. (2014). Consensus on circulatory shock and hemodynamic monitoring. Task force of the European Society of Intensive Care Medicine. Intensive care medicine, 40, 1795–1815. doi:10.1007/s00134-014-3525-z
