= National Collaborating Centre for Infectious Diseases =

Canadian health charity

The National Collaborating Centre for Infectious Diseases, formerly The International Centre for Infectious Disease (ICID) is a Canadian organisation set up in 2004 to collaborate resources worldwide in the fight against infectious diseases.

== Purpose ==
The ICID is a non-profit charitable organisation that helps improve resources at a strategic as well as research level. Their main goals are to:

- Organise and collaborate expertise - combine experts from a wide range of sectors including academic, government, business and charity, allowing for the dissemination of ideas and research methods so that organisations can effectively tackle national and international challenges relating to infectious diseases.
- Train professionals - to administer specialized training to professionals who work in public health and high-containment laboratories across the world.
- Lead strategic initiatives - to provide managerial and secretariat services to infectious disease communities.

== History ==
The ICID was created in 2004 on the advice of a 2003 joint federal, provincial and community committee. This task force was co-chaired by Dr. Frank Plummer of the Public Health Agency of Canada and Terry Duguid who is a past president and CEO of the ICID, envisioning a non-profit and completely independent organisation.
