= Ontario Medical Association =

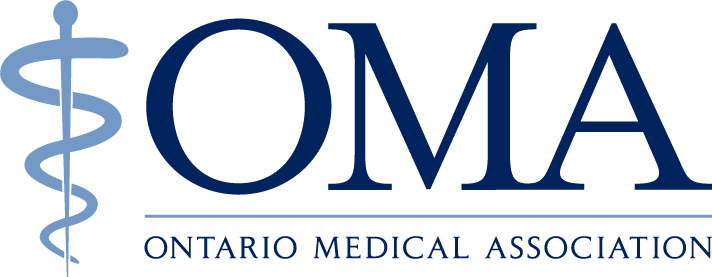
- Abbreviation: OMA
- Formation: 1880; Foundation 1881.
- Type: Professional Association
- Headquarters: Toronto, Ontario, Canada
- Members: 43,000
- Official language: English
- President: Dr. Rebecca Hicks
- President-Elect: Dr. Haroon Yousuf
- CEO: Dr. Andrew Park (interim)
- Website: www.oma.org

The Ontario Medical Association (OMA) is a membership organization that represents the political, clinical and economic interests of Ontario physicians. Practising physicians, residents, and medical students enrolled in any of the six Ontario faculties of medicine are eligible for OMA membership. The OMA runs programs to encourage healthy living practices and illness prevention.

== History ==
The OMA was founded in 1880 by physicians across the province of Ontario who encouraged the profession to unite and form a provincial medical association.

The OMA is governed by a board of directors. The board is made up of 11 directors: eight physician directors and three non-physician directors. The officers of the board are the chair, president, president-elect and the immediate past president. The president-elect and immediate past president are non-voting observers on the board.

The General Assembly is another large member body that collects member input to help identify and recommend organizational priorities to the board, including opportunities and challenges facing the profession. The General Assembly is composed of the General Assembly steering committee, the Priority and Leadership Group, the three panels and working groups.

== Membership and structure ==
The Ontario Medical Association (OMA) represents more than 43,000 physicians and medical students across the province. While membership is voluntary, as of 1991, all practicing physicians in Ontario are mandated by law to pay dues to the organization, regardless of whether or not they choose to be members. The Ministry of Health recognizes the organization as the sole negotiator on behalf of physicians in Ontario and has been called a union by Bob Rae, a claim rejected by the OMA.

== Foundation ==
The OMA engages in fundraising and philanthropy through the Ontario Medical Foundation (OMF). Starting in 2018, the OMF began a transformation to dedicate more time and funds to charitable causes beyond its community of members. The OMF has received donations and sponsorships from over 7000 sponsors including individuals, corporations and societies. Some of the foundation's largest donors are Amgen, AstraZeneca, Bayer, the Canadian Medical Association, GlaxoSmithKline, KPMG, Merck Frosst, Pfizer Canada, Pharmacia, Royal Bank of Canada and Sun Life Financial.

== Ontario Medical Schools ==
- Queen's School of Medicine
- University of Toronto Faculty of Medicine
- Schulich School of Medicine & Dentistry
- Northern Ontario School of Medicine
- Michael G. DeGroote School of Medicine
- Faculty of Medicine – University of Ottawa

== See also ==
- Canadian Medical Association
- College of Physicians and Surgeons of Ontario
- Canadian Medical Association Journal
