= Alari =

Alari is a given name and surname. As a given name, it is the Estonian form of the given name Alaric. Notable people with the name include:

- Alari Kivisaar (born 1967), Estonian television personality and nature photographer
- Alari Lell (born 1976), Estonian footballer
- Alberto Alari (born 1999), Italian football player
- Nadine Alari (1927–2016), French film and television actress

== See also ==
- Advanced Learning and Research Institute (ALaRI), research and education institute in Lugano, Switzerland
- Alarie, French surname
- Alary, surname
- Allary (disambiguation)
