= Alary =

Alary is a surname. Notable people with the surname include:

- Alfred Edmond Féchet de Alary (fl. 1840–1843), French military doctor and father of Eugene Fechet
- Damien Alary (1951–2025), French politician
- Giulio Alary (1814–1891), Italian composer
- Madame Alary, character in The Lilac Domino
- Michel Alary (born 1954), Canadian epidemiology academic
- Olivier Alary (born 1975), French-Canadian musician and composer
- Pierre-Joseph Alary (1689–1770), French thinker

== See also ==
- the word alary, meaning pertaining to wings
- Alary, a race in the science fiction series The Stars Are Cold Toys
- alary muscles, in insects
- Evremond de Saint-Alary (1868–1941), French horse owner and breeder
- Araly, Sri Lanka town
- Alarie, surname
- McAlary, surname
