= Thomas Brzustowski =

Canadian engineer, academic, and civil servant (1937–2020)

Thomas Anthony Brzustowski OC
- Born: April 4, 1937; Warsaw, Poland
- Died: June 19, 2020 (aged 83); Waterloo, Ontario, Canada
- Education: University of Toronto; Princeton University
- Awards: Order of Canada

Thomas Anthony Brzustowski, OC FRSC (Polish: Tomasz Antoni Brzustowski; April 4, 1937 – June 19, 2020) was a Canadian engineer, academic, and civil servant.

Born in Warsaw, he moved to Canada with his family when he was 11. He received a B.A.Sc. degree in engineering physics from the University of Toronto in 1958. He received an M.A. degree from Princeton University in 1960 and a Ph.D. degree in aeronautical engineering in 1963.

He then joined the University of Waterloo teaching in the department of mechanical engineering. From 1967 to 1970 he was the chairman of the department and from 1975 to 1987 he was Vice-President, Academic. From 1987 to 1991 he was the Ontario deputy minister of Colleges and Universities. He was president of the Natural Sciences and Engineering Research Council from 1995 to 2005.

From 2005 to 2012 he served as the inaugural RBC Professor in Commercialization of Innovation at the University of Ottawa and wrote the book The Way Ahead: Meeting Canada's Productivity Challenge. He coined the phrase "Necessity may be the mother of invention, but competition is the father of innovation." He was also the first Chair of the Advisory Committee of the Institute for Science, Society and Policy at that university.

He was chair of the board of the Institute for Quantum Computing at the University of Waterloo from 2006 to 2014, chair of the scientific advisory committee (SAC) for the national Council of Canadian Academies (CCA) from 2010 to 2013; from 2016 to 2019 he sat on CCA's board of directors.

He died on June 19, 2020, at Grand River Hospital following a brief illness.

== Honours ==
Brzustowski has received honorary degrees from the University of Guelph (1994), Ryerson Polytechnic University (1996), University of Waterloo (1997), McMaster University (2000), University of Alberta (2000), University of Ottawa (2000), École Polytechnique de Montréal (2001), Concordia University (2003), Royal Military College of Canada (2003), Brock University (2005), the University of Victoria (2005), York University (2005), University of Northern British Columbia (2006), Carleton University (2007), and Lakehead University (2011).

In 1997 Brzustowski was elected to Fellow of the Canadian Academy of Engineering. In 2001, he was made a Fellow of the Royal Society of Canada. In 2002, he was made an Officer of the Order of Canada. He is an honorary member of the Royal Military College of Canada, student # S143.

== Books ==
- Brzustowski, Thomas A (1969). Introduction to the principles of engineering thermodynamics. Reading, Mass.: Addison-Wesley Pub. Co. ISBN 978-0201007503.
- Brzustowski, Tom (2008). The Way Ahead: Meeting Canada's Productivity Challenge. Ottawa: Univ. of Ottawa Press. ISBN 978-0-7766-0669-9.

== See also ==
- List of University of Waterloo people
