= Boghuma Kabisen Titanji =

Cameroonian medical doctor and clinical researcher

- Born: Yaoundé, Cameroon
- Education: London School of Hygiene and Tropical Medicine; University College London
- Awards: Commonwealth Scholarship British Broadcasting Corporation's list of the "100 Women Changing the World"
- Scientific career
- Workplaces: Emory University School of Medicine

Boghuma Kabisen Titanji is a Cameroonian medical doctor and clinical researcher. She is an expert on HIV drug resistant viruses and an associate professor at Emory University.

== Early life and education ==
Titanji was born in Cameroon. She received her MSc and DTM&H in Tropical Medicine and International Health from the London School of Hygiene & Tropical Medicine in 2010 and a PhD in Infectious Diseases studying HIV-1 cell-to-cell spread and Antiretroviral therapy drug resistance from University College London in 2014.

== Career ==
Titanji's work focuses on the mechanisms of HIV transmission and antiretroviral drug resistance. She joined Emory University School of Medicine in 2016 as an internal medicine resident and now serves as an associate professor in the Department of Medicine's Division of Infectious Diseases.

In May 2012, she gave a TED Talk on the ethics of medical research in Africa.

== Recognition and awards ==
- 2023: Winner of the Health Care Innovator/Research Award; Atlanta Business Chronicle’s 2023 Health Care Heroes programme.
- 2014: Named one of the BBC 100 Women for her work on the advancement of ethically sound research
- 2012: Titanji was awarded a Commonwealth Scholarship

== Selected publications ==
- Titanji, Boghuma Kabisen; Pillay, Deenan; Jolly, Clare (1 April 2017). "Combination antiretroviral therapy and cell–cell spread of wild-type and drug-resistant human immunodeficiency virus-1". Journal of General Virology. 98 (4): 821–834. doi:10.1099/jgv.0.000728. ISSN 0022-1317. PMC 5657029. PMID 28141491.
- Titanji, Boghuma Kabisen; Aasa-Chapman, Marlen; Pillay, Deenan; Jolly, Clare (December 2013). "Protease inhibitors effectively block cell-to-cell spread of HIV-1 between T cells". Retrovirology. 10 (1): 161. doi:10.1186/1742-4690-10-161. ISSN 1742-4690. PMC 3877983. PMID 24364896.
