= David Ho =

Taiwanese physician and scientist

- 何大一
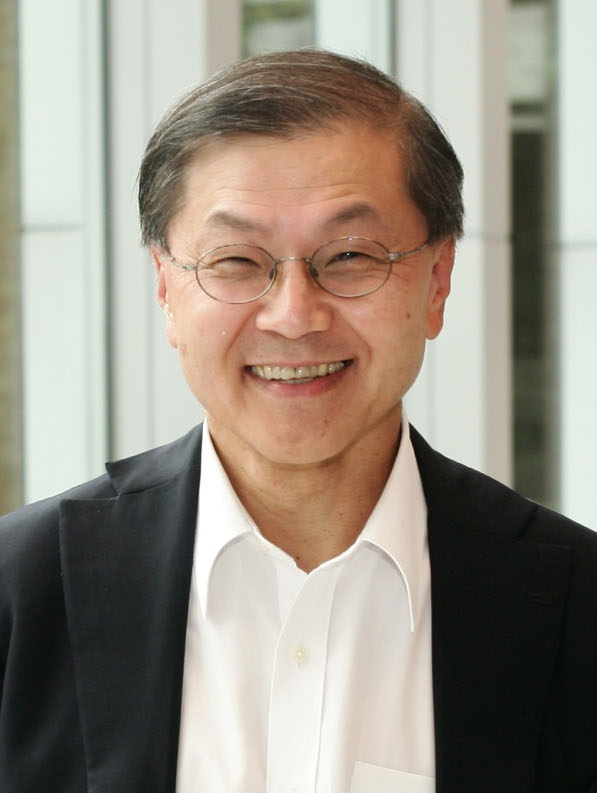
- Ho in 2012
- Born: Ho Da-i; November 3, 1952 (age 73); Taichung, Taiwan
- Education: California Institute of Technology (BS); Harvard University (MD)
- Known for: HIV/AIDS research
- Awards: Ernst Jung Prize (1991); Bristol-Myers Squibb Award (1996); American Academy of Arts and Sciences (1997); Presidential Citizens Medal (2001)
- Scientific career
- Fields: Virology
- Workplaces: Columbia University; Rockefeller University

Chinese name
- Chinese: 何大一
Transcriptions
Standard Mandarin
- Hanyu Pinyin: Hé Dà-yī
- Gwoyeu Romatzyh: Her Dahi
- Wade–Giles: He^{2} Ta^{4}-i^{1}
- Tongyong Pinyin: Hé Dà-yī
Southern Min
- Hokkien POJ: Hô Tāi-it
- Website: www.adarc.cuimc.columbia.edu/research/research-labs/ho-lab

David Da-i Ho (Chinese: 何大一; pinyin: Hé Dà-yī; born November 3, 1952) is a Taiwanese-American physician-scientist and virologist known for his contributions to HIV/AIDS research. He pioneered the use of combination anti-retroviral therapy instead of single therapy in the treatment of HIV infection which transformed HIV from an absolute terminal disease into a chronic disease.

Ho was born in Taiwan in 1952 and immigrated to the United States in 1965. After graduating from the California Institute of Technology, he earned his Doctor of Medicine (M.D.) from Harvard Medical School, then received his clinical training at the UCLA School of Medicine and Massachusetts General Hospital.

He is the founding scientific director of the Aaron Diamond AIDS Research Center and the Clyde and Helen Wu Professor of Medicine at Columbia University Vagelos College of Physicians and Surgeons, both housed at Columbia University Irving Medical Center.

== Early life and education ==
Ho was born in Taichung, Taiwan, on November 3, 1952, the eldest of two sons. His mother, Sonia Chiang Shuang-ju (Chinese: 江雙如), was a native of Taichung. His father, Ho Pu-chi (Chinese: 何步基; 1919–2009), was a native of Shangli, Jiangxi, who graduated from Zhejiang University and moved from mainland China to Taiwan in 1947 to work as a teacher at Changhua Girls' Senior High School. Pu-chi was a devout Christian who took the Christian name Paul, and moved to the U.S. in 1957, earning a degree in electrical engineering from the University of Southern California. The family's ancestral home was in Xinyu, Jiangxi.

In Taiwan, Ho attended Taichung Municipal Guang-Fu Elementary School until sixth grade. According to Time, "the Ho family lived in a modest four-room house with a backyard ditch that served as a toilet and from which farmers collected fertilizer for their fields".

In 1965, Ho moved with his brother and mother to California, where his father was a graduate student, and became a naturalized citizen of the U.S. in 1970. He was raised in Los Angeles and, after attending John Marshall High School, graduated from the California Institute of Technology with a Bachelor of Science (B.S.) in biology with highest honors in 1974. As an undergraduate, he worked at a lab at MIT under immunologist Herman Eisen. He then earned his Doctor of Medicine (M.D.) from Harvard Medical School in 1978.

== Career ==
Ho has been engaged in HIV/AIDS research since the beginning of the pandemic, initially focusing on clinical virology and select topics in HIV pathogenesis, including HIV drug resistance. Before 1996, AZT and other early 1990s antiretroviral medication were prescribed in single therapy, which still did not prevent progression to fatal full-blown AIDS. In the mid-1990s, his research team conducted a series of elegant human studies to elucidate the dynamics of HIV replication in vivo. This knowledge, in turn, formed the foundation for their pioneering effort to treat HIV "early and hard" and in demonstrating for the first time the durable control of HIV replication in patients receiving combination antiretroviral therapy, which had been subsequently developed by scientists at NIAID and Merck. He and his ADARC team presented the remarkable results from using combination antiretroviral therapy at International AIDS Conference 1996. This was the turning point in the epidemic that an automatic death sentence was transformed into a manageable disease.

Ho has published more than 500 research papers as of February 2020.

Ho is a member of the Committee of 100, a Chinese American leadership organization, in addition to several scientific groups.

Ho led a team, funded by the Jack Ma Foundation, to look for a vaccine for the COVID-19 virus.

== Honors and titles ==
Ho was Time magazine's 1996 Man of the Year. Time later recalled the selection surprising both Ho and readers. The magazine acknowledged in 1996 that "Ho is not, to be sure, a household name. But some people make headlines while others make history." As of 2024, Ho is the last person to be selected as Person of the Year in a U.S. presidential election year without winning that year's U.S. presidential election. In 1998, he received the Golden Plate Award of the American Academy of Achievement. Ho was even briefly mentioned when Alexander Fleming was considered for Person of the Century in 1999, since Fleming could be portrayed as representative of other disease-fighting scientists including Ho, but the title ultimately went to Albert Einstein.

Ho was the chosen commencement speaker at Caltech, MIT, and Harvard T. H. Chan School of Public Health in 2000.

Ho has received numerous honors and awards for his scientific accomplishments. On January 8, 2001, he was presented with the Presidential Citizens Medal by President Clinton.

On December 6, 2006, California governor Arnold Schwarzenegger and First Lady Maria Shriver inducted Ho into the California Hall of Fame located at The California Museum for History, Women, and the Arts.

Ho was awarded the Distinguished Alumni Award by California Institute of Technology in 2015. Ho received the Portrait of a Nation Prize at the National Portrait Gallery, Smithsonian Institution in 2017.

Other accolades include the Ernst Jung Prize in Medicine, Mayor's Award for Excellence in Science & Technology, the Squibb Award, the Architect of Peace and the Hoechst Marion Roussel Award.

Ho has been elected as a member of the American Academy of Arts and Sciences, Academia Sinica (Taiwan), and the U.S. National Academy of Medicine (formerly Institute of Medicine). He is currently a member of the board of trustees of the California Institute of Technology. He was a member of the Board of Overseers of Harvard University and a board member of the MIT Corporation.

He is also a member of the Chinese Academy of Engineering.

Ho was recognized by the Kingdom of Thailand with the Prince Mahidol Award in Medicine.

Ho was awarded Hamdan Award for Medical Research Excellence - Immunity in 2022.

== Personal life ==
Ho is married to Tera Wong, with whom he has four children: Kathryn, Jonathan, Jaclyn, and Jerren.

== See also ==
- Treatment of HIV/AIDS
- International AIDS Conference 1996
- Aaron Diamond AIDS Research Center
- Chinese Americans in New York City
- Taiwanese Americans in New York City
