= Meslin (surname) =

Meslin is a surname. Notable people with the surname include:

- Christophe Meslin (born 1977), French footballer
- Eric Mark Meslin (born 1961), Canadian-American philosopher-bioethicist
- Michel Meslin (1926–2010), French academic
- Dave Meslin, Canadian activist
