= Aaron Diamond AIDS Research Center =

AIDS research organization

Aaron Diamond AIDS Research Center, often abbreviated as ADARC, is a United States medical research institution dedicated to finding a cure for HIV/AIDS. It is headed by scientist Dr. David Ho, who was the 1996 Time magazine Person of the Year, and is located in New York City.

Opening in 1991, the center was the brainchild of the Aaron Diamond Foundation headed by his widow Irene Diamond, the New York City Department of Health, the Public Health Research Institute and New York University School of Medicine. It became affiliated with Rockefeller University in 1996, and became part of Columbia University's medical school, Columbia University Vagelos College of Physicians and Surgeons, in 2019.

One is the introduction of combination antiretroviral therapy to combat HIV drug resistance and hence prevent progression to fatal full-blown AIDS. David Ho and his team presented their remarkable clinical trial results at the International AIDS Conference 1996. This marked a turning point in which HIV infection was no longer an absolute terminal disease but a manageable chronic disease.
