= David Castle (philosopher) =

Canadian philosopher and bioethicist

David Castle is a Canadian philosopher and bioethicist. He is a professor in Public Administration and Business at the University of Victoria (UVic). He had previously served as Vice-President of Research at UVic from 2014 to 2019. Prior to his appointment at UVic, he was a Professor and the Chair of Innovations in the Life Sciences at the University of Edinburgh, where he investigated how to get others to innovate. From 2006 to 2010, he served as Canada Research Chair in Science and Society at the University of Ottawa, where he developed ideas leading to the creation of the Institute for Science, Society and Policy.

He received his B.Sc. and B.A. from the University of Alberta, M.A. from McMaster University, and Ph.D. from the University of Guelph, supervised by Michael Ruse.

His research focuses on social issues and government policy relating to biotechnology, such as nutrigenomics, biodiversity, and open science.

On June 1, 2016, Castle was appointed Chair of the Steering Committee of Research Data Canada, an organization supported by CANARIE.

He is a researcher in residence at the Office of the Chief Science Advisor, Canada.

== Selected contributions ==
- Science, Society, and the Supermarket: The Opportunities and Challenges of Nutrigenomics (2006) ISBN 0-471-77000-0
- Genetically Modified Foods: Debating Biotechnology (2002) ISBN 1-57392-996-4
- "A semantic view of ecological theories" Dialectica (2001)
