= XI International AIDS Conference, 1996 =

The XI International AIDS Conference was held in Vancouver July 7–12, 1996. The theme of the conference was "One World One Hope".

== Highlights ==
The conference's co-chairs were Martin Schechter, Julio Montaner, Michael O´Shaughnessy and Michael Rekart. Donna Shalala gave the plenary address.

This was the first conference after the technological advance of being able to measure HIV viral load.

A study presented showed that United States military had higher risk of HIV infection.

The conference presented the introduction of combination therapy using protease inhibitors. ADARC's David Ho and his team showed their clinical trial results. Within a week after the conference, over 75,000 patients who had been using antibiotics and chemotherapy as treatment against opportunistic infections began an effective antiviral regimen which greatly increased their immune system strength and therefore their health. This marked a turning point in which HIV infection was no longer an absolute terminal disease but a manageable chronic disease.

== See also ==
- Aaron Diamond AIDS Research Center
