= Marc Saner =

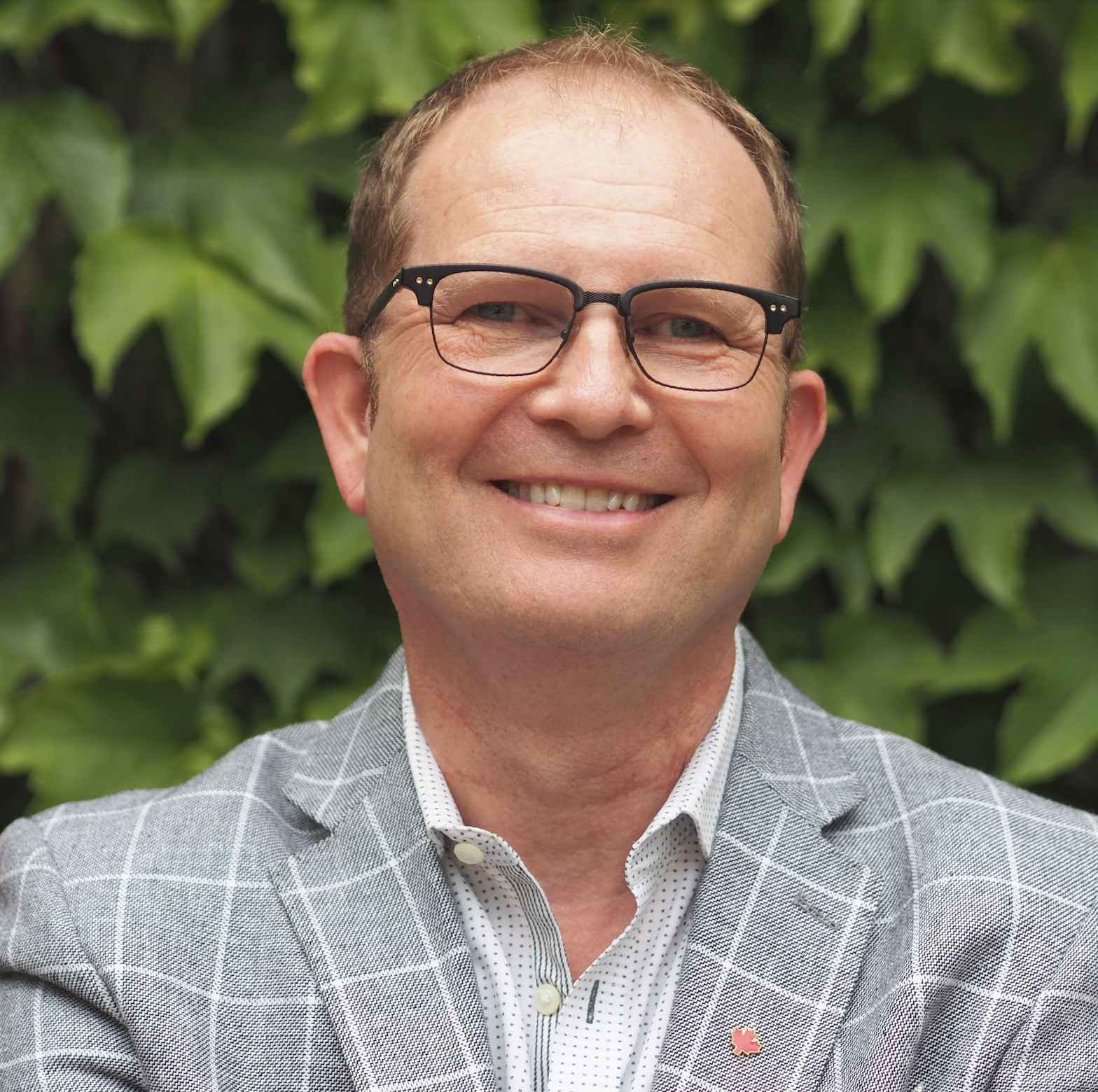
- Marc Saner in 2020
- Born: Marc Albert Saner; 1961 (age 64–65)
- Education: University of Basel, Carleton University
- Occupations: Professor, Advisor, Speaker, Author
- Years active: 1982-present

Marc Saner (born 1961) is a full professor at the University of Ottawa, Canada. From 2022 to 2025, he served as Departmental Science Advisor to Natural Resources Canada.

== Education ==
Saner studied biology at the University of Basel, Switzerland (PhD, 1991) and philosophy at Carleton University, Canada (MA 1999).

== Career ==
Upon completion of his doctorate, he served as a regulatory scientist at the Pest Management Regulatory Agency. He then obtained a graduate degree in philosophy and became the managing director of the Ethics and Policy Issues Centre (EPIC) at Carleton University.

He served as a director at the Institute on Governance from 2003 to 2006 and as the Executive Vice-President and Director of Assessments at the Council of Canadian Academies (CCA) from 2006 to 2007 and the executive director of the Regulatory Governance Initiative at the School of Public Policy and Administration at Carleton University from 2008 to 2010.

In 2010, Marc Saner became the Inaugural Director of the Institute for Science, Society and Policy (ISSP) at the University of Ottawa. He developed the ISSP from 2010 to 2015 and established a network of fellows, advisors and faculty, as well as the institute's first graduate program. From 2018 to 2024, he was Chair of the Department of Geography, Environment and Geomatics. From 2022 to 2025, he served part-time as Departmental Science Advisor to Natural Resources Canada.

He is currently a professor at the University of Ottawa, Department of Geography, Environment and Geomatics.

== Media presence ==
On March 16, 2012, Marc Saner appeared on The Agenda with Steve Paikin (TVO), discussing “The Coming of Technopolitics” alongside guests Elizabeth May, John Duffy, and Darin Barney.

== Event organization ==
On February 10, 2014, Marc Saner hosted David Willetts, then Minister of State for Universities and Science of the United Kingdom, for a panel discussion on science policy and diplomacy.

On June 3, 2015, he hosted the symposium "Technological Unemployment and the Future of Work" with keynote speaker Nick Bostrom of Oxford University.

On January 13, 2020, he hosted the Alex Trebek Forum, “How Do We Know It’s True? Can We Mobilize All Forms of Knowledge?”, featuring a video introduction by Alex Trebek.

== Selected works ==
=== Book chapters ===
- Saner M. (2013) The Role of Adaptation in the Governance of Emerging Technologies in Marchant, G. E., Abbott, K. W., and Allenby, B. (eds.), Innovative Governance Models for Emerging Technologies, (Edward Elgar Publishing, Northampton, Massachusetts), pp. 92–107.
- Saner M. & Geelen J. (2012) Identity in a Technological Society: Governance Implications, Chapter 37 in Luppicini, Rocci (ed.), Handbook of Research on Technoself: Identity in a Technological Society, (IGI Global, Hershey, Pennsylvania, 2012), pp. 720–741.
- Saner M. (2008) Ethics, Governance and Regulation and the Environmental Aspects of Aquaculture in Culver, Keith and David Castle (eds.), Aquaculture, Innovation and Social Transformation (Springer, International Library of Environmental, Agricultural, and Food Ethics Vol. 17), pp. 115–121.
- Saner M., D.R. Clements, M.R. Hall, D.J. Doohan & C.W. Crompton (2005). The Biology of Canadian weeds. 105. Linaria vulgaris Mill. in P.B. Cavers (ed.), The Biology of Canadian Weeds (The Agricultural Institute of Ottawa), Vol. 5. pp. 16–29.
- Saner M. (2002). Real and Metaphorical Moral Limits in the Biotechnology Debate in Ruse, M. and David Castle (eds.), Genetically Modified Foods (Prometheus Books, New York), pp. 77–79.

=== Monographs ===
- A Primer on Scientific Risk Assessment at Health Canada by Marc Saner (2010), Health Canada Catalogue number: H22-4/3-2010. ISBN 978-1-100-15377-3
- International Approaches to the Regulatory Governance of Nanotechnology by Jennifer Pelley and Marc Saner (2009), School of Public Policy and Administration, Carleton University. ISBN 978-0-7709-0530-9
- A Primer for Scientists: Ethical Issues of Environmental Biotechnology Research by Marc Saner (2001), Environment Canada Catalogue number: En40-645/2001E-IN. ISBN 0-662-31136-1

== Affiliations ==
- Adjunct Research Professor, Department of Philosophy, Carleton University, Ottawa, Canada
- Fellow, Balsillie School of International Affairs, Waterloo, Canada
- Faculty Fellow, Center for Law, Science and Innovation, Arizona State University, Phoenix, USA
- Member, Science and Democracy Network, Harvard Kennedy School, Boston, USA
- Member, Departmental Science Advisors Network, Office of the Chief Science Advisor, Ottawa, Canada
- Advisory Committee Member, AI Insights for Policymakers, Mila, Montreal, Canada

== Personal life ==
Marc Saner is married to Canadian artist Lorena Ziraldo. He holds a black belt in Taekwondo.
