= Martin Schechter (epidemiologist) =

HIV/AIDS researcher

Martin Schechter CM OBC
- Born: December 16, 1951 (age 74); Toronto, Ontario, Canada
- Education: University of British Columbia; Polytechnic Institute of New York; York University; McMaster University; University of Toronto
- Known for: HIV/AIDS
- Awards: Order of British Columbia (1994); National Health Scientist Award in AIDS; Science Council of British Columbia Gold Medal (2002); Fellow of the Royal Society of Canada (2004); Fellow of the Canadian Academy of Health Sciences (2004); Order of Canada (2022)
- Scientific career
- Fields: Epidemiology
- Workplaces: University of British Columbia

Martin T. Schechter CM OBC (born December 16, 1951) is a Canadian epidemiologist recognized for contributions to research about HIV prevention and treatments, addiction research, and Indigenous health research. He is a professor and was the founding director of the School of Population and Public Health in the Faculty of Medicine at the University of British Columbia (UBC). Schechter received his Order of British Columbia in 1994 alongside BC's first Nobel Prize laureate Michael Smith and noted Indigenous artist Bill Reid. In 2022, Schechter was named as a Member of the Order of Canada.

== Education ==
Schechter completed his Bachelor of Arts in mathematics at York University (1973), his Master of Arts in mathematics at UBC (1975), his Doctor of Philosophy in mathematics at the Polytechnic Institute of New York under the supervision of Wilhelm Magnus (1977), his MD in Medicine at McMaster University (1981) and his Master of Science in epidemiology at the University of Toronto (1983).

== Contributions to health research ==
Schechter combines interests in clinical epidemiology and health services research with HIV/AIDS and urban health research including opioid addiction research. He is also active in Indigenous health research. Schechter is the author of more than 400 peer-reviewed publications and 600 abstracts and scholarly presentations.

When Schechter first began his work on AIDS research in 1983, there were no reported cases yet in British Columbia and embracing the necessity of an appropriate and humane response to HIV infection was not a popular activity at that time. Airing public service announcements about condoms in movie theatres caused a public and private debate between Schechter and then-Premier of British Columbia Bill Vander Zalm. Had HIV not been such an emerging health crisis, Schechter likely would have continued in the field of breast cancer.

In 1989, he helped organize the Fifth International Conference on AIDS in Montreal as a member of its steering committee. In 1990, he was invited by the World Health Organization to participate on its 10-member Steering Committee on Epidemiology, Forecasting and Surveillance that was monitoring the scale of the AIDS epidemic and advising on prevention programs in the early period of the epidemic.

Schechter co-founded the Canadian HIV Trials Network in 1990 with John Ruedy and Julio Montaner. Under Schechter's leadership as National Director from 1992 to 2014, the Network grew to become a nationwide collaboration of researchers, people living with HIV/AIDS and facilities to investigate treatments, preventions and vaccines for HIV/AIDS.

In 1992, he co-founded the British Columbia Centre for Excellence in HIV/AIDS and was its Director of Epidemiology and Public Health from 1992 - 2006. Schechter also co-founded the Canadian Association for HIV Research and served as its inaugural President in 1991.

In 1996, Schechter co-chaired the XI International AIDS Conference in Vancouver which attracted 15,000 delegates from around the world. It was at this global conference that the benefits of triple-therapy HAART were first fully revealed.

In 2004, he co-founded the Canadian Academy of Health Sciences, serving as its first President-Elect from 2004 to 2007 and second President from 2007 to 2009.

From 2006 to 2021, Schechter served as the inaugural Chief Scientific Officer of the Michael Smith Foundation for Health Research, and joined the inaugural board of the newly formed Michael Smith Health Research BC in 2021.

== Heroin trials ==
Schechter was the principal investigator and co-authored a study published in the New England Journal of Medicine about the controversial North American Opiate Medication Initiative (NAOMI). This 2005-2008 randomized controlled trial compared the use of diacetylmorphine (pharmaceutical heroin) and methadone in people with severe opioid dependence. In the NAOMI trial, researchers recruited 250 subjects in Vancouver and Montreal with at least five years of heroin addiction and who had twice previously not benefited from addiction treatment including methadone maintenance. The study found those receiving the effective element of heroin were 62 per cent more likely to remain in addiction treatment and 40 per cent less likely to take street drugs and commit crimes to support their habit than those given methadone. Providing injections of medically prescribed heroin in a clinic setting was projected to save about $40,000 per person in lifetime societal costs compared to methadone.

Schechter was also involved as a lead investigator in the follow-up to NAOMI, the Study to Assess Longer-term Opioid Medication Effectiveness (SALOME) funded by Canadian Institutes of Health Research. The SALOME trial established that the licensed analgesic drug, hydromorphone, was as effective as heroin in the treatment of severe opioid dependence, opening another avenue for treatment with injectable medications. In 2013, then Federal Health Minister Rona Ambrose controversially cancelled an approval from Health Canada regarding compassionate use of heroin for some research subjects after they completed the trial. Schechter questioned the value placed on research evidence by the federal government of the day. The BMJ requested and published his commentary Drug users should be able to get heroin from the health system in April 2015.

Following a change in the Canadian federal government in 2015, substantive changes were made to Canadian policy regarding the use of diacetylmorphine and hydromorphone, particularly in response to the opioid overdose epidemic. In 2018, the Canadian government amended regulations to make medically prescribed heroin more accessible. Specifically, the new rules allow for administering diacetylmorphine outside of a hospital setting, and let nurse practitioners administer the drug. In 2019, Canada became the first country in the world to approve the use of hydromorphone for severe opioid use disorder based on the results of the SALOME trial.

== Indigenous health research ==
Along with Patricia Spittal and Kukpi Wayne Christian (Splatsin Secwepemc Nation), Schechter has served as principal investigator of the Cedar Project, funded by the Canadian Institutes of Health Research. The Cedar Project began in 2003 and involves 800 Indigenous participants between the ages of 14 and 30 who use non-injection and injection drugs. All aspects the study are led by the Cedar Project Partnership, an independent coalition of Indigenous Elders, leaders, and health/wellness experts. Cedar studies have highlighted the ongoing impacts of settler colonialism on Indigenous families and communities, including the foster care system, sexual abuse, extreme poverty, and racism. Cedar research has provided critical quantitative and qualitative evidence of these intergenerational colonial harms among young, street-involved Indigenous people who cope by using criminalized drugs.

Along with Nadine Caron, Schechter helped to co-found the UBC Centre for Excellence in Indigenous Health in 2014, and they serve as its inaugural co-directors. The centre is a single coordinating point for Indigenous health initiatives within UBC and acts as a contact for communities and organizations external to UBC. The centre is dedicated to advancing Indigenous people's health through education, innovative thinking, research, and traditional practice. It works to improve wellness, health care and patient outcomes, and promote self-determination that includes increasing Indigenous leadership in all aspects of health and health care.

== Recognition ==
OBC ribbon

- One of only two Canadians awarded the National Health Scientist Award in AIDS by Health and Welfare Canada (1986).
- Member of the Order of British Columbia (1994)
- Tier I Canada Research Chair in HIV/AIDS and Urban Population Health (2001)
- Science Council of British Columbia Gold Medal (2002)
- Fellow of the Royal Society of Canada (2004)
- Fellow of the Canadian Academy of Health Sciences (2005)
- Member of the Order of Canada (2022)
