= Canadian Association for HIV Research =

Canadian research organization

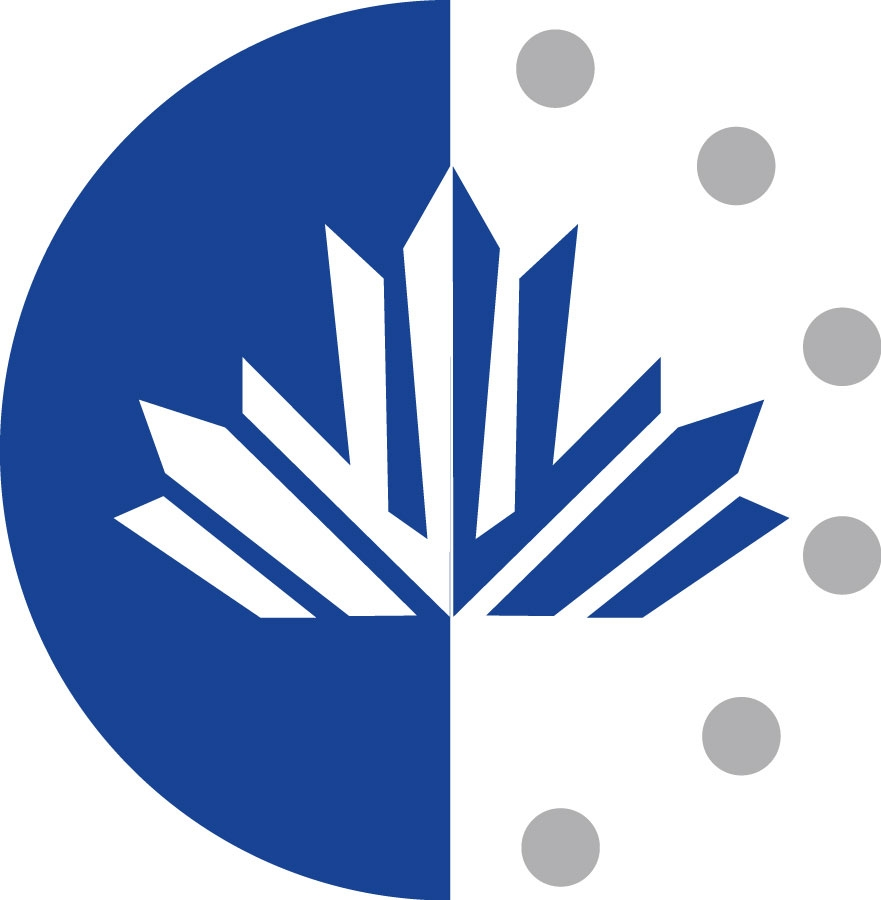
CAHR logo

The Canadian Association for HIV Research (CAHR) is an organization that represents HIV/AIDS research in Canada or by Canadians. CAHR includes all researchers and all disciplines of the scientific approaches to HIV and AIDS, for the purpose of its better prevention and treatment and ultimately for its eradication and cure. Disciplines represented by CAHR include basic science, clinical science, epidemiology/public health and social science.

An estimated 65,000 Canadians were living with HIV infection (including AIDS) in 2008. Research in the area of HIV/AIDS is critical to combat the epidemic, as there are an estimated 2,300 to 4,300 new infections each year in Canada.

== Mission ==
CAHR's mission is to promote excellence in HIV research; foster collaboration and cooperation among HIV research communities, including basic science, clinical science, epidemiology & public health, and social science; promote education and the development of new researchers; and provide a unified voice for Canadian HIV researchers and engage diverse stakeholders (community, industry, Government, NGO's etc.) in ongoing dialogue and knowledge exchange to ensure that HIV research remains responsive to their needs.

== Council ==
The CAHR Council is divided into two groups: the Executive Council and Council Members.

The Executive Council includes the President, Past President, President-Elect, Treasurer and Executive Director.

Council Members include the CAHR secretary and representatives from the community, social sciences, basic science, clinical and epidemiology & public health. CAHR's current president is Dr. Jonathan Angel. Past presidents include Martin Schechter, Catherine Hankins, Mark Wainberg, Michael O'Shaughnessy, Michel Alary, Ken Rosenthal, Liviana Calzavara, Ted Myers and William Cameron.

== Canadian Conference on HIV/AIDS ==
CAHR's principal event is the annual Canadian Conference on HIV/AIDS. This conference is the venue where HIV researchers in Canada present the results of their work and engage in knowledge exchange activities with their peers as well as with investigators in other disciplines and with the HIV/AIDS community. The conference typically begins with a lecture named after Mark Wainberg, a leader in Canadian HIV Research. The 2011 Mark Wainberg lecturer was James Orbinski. The conference is held each spring and location varies each year.
