= Michel Alary =

Canadian academic, doctor

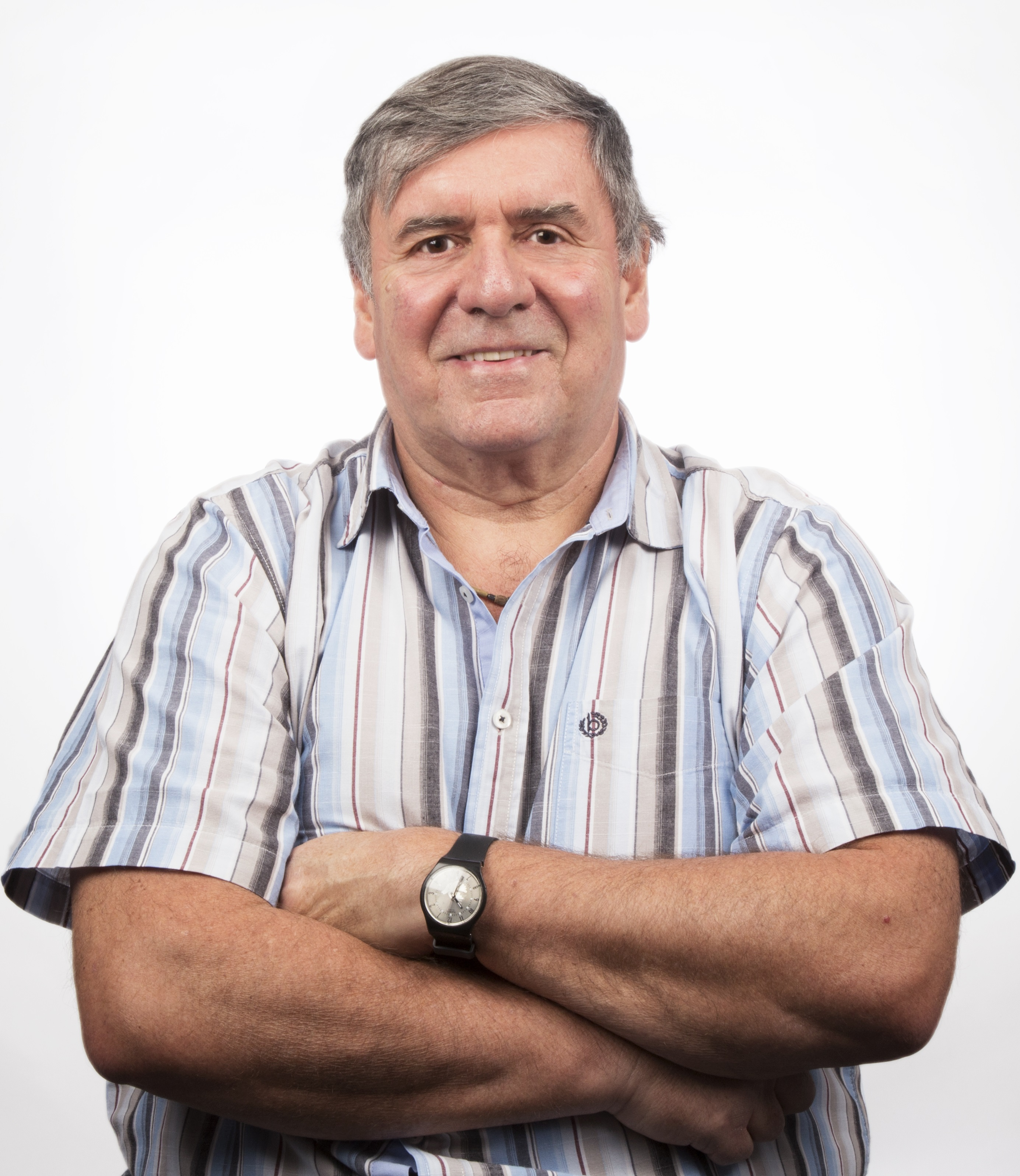
- Born: July 13, 1954 (age 72); Canada
- Occupations: Doctor, academic and health researcher
- Awards: Mark Wainberg Lecturer Award, Canadian Association for HIV Research; Researcher emeritus award, Réseau de recherche en santé des populations du Québec; Trailblazer Award In Population and Public health Research, Canadian Institutes of Health Research

Academic background
- Education: D.E.C. M.D. M.Sc., Epidemiology; Ph.D., Epidemiology
- Alma mater: CEGEP de Sherbrooke; Université de Sherbrooke; Université Laval
- Thesis: Contamination of hot water systems by Legionellae

Academic work
- Institutions: CHU de Québec – Université Laval

Michel Alary (born July 13, 1954) is a Canadian academic, doctor of preventive medicine and a health researcher. He is a Professor of Social and Preventive Medicine at Université Laval and the director of population health research at the Research Centre of the CHU de Quebec – Université Laval. He also serves as a Medical Consultant at the Institut national de santé publique du Québec. Alary has published over 260 research papers and has produced major reports for the World Bank and UNAIDS about HIV in sub-Saharan Africa. He also evaluated the Bill & Melinda Gates Foundation's India AIDS Initiative for which his project received the Avahan Recognition Award. He has conducted epidemiological and preventive research on blood-borne infections, HIV and other Sexually Transmitted Diseases (STD) among the most vulnerable populations in developed and developing countries.

Alary is the recipient of the Mark Wainberg Lecturer Award from the Canadian Association for HIV Research, the Researcher Emeritus Award from the Réseau de la recherche ne santé des populations du Québec and the Graduate Emeritus award from the Fondation de l'Université laval. He has also served as President of the International Society for STD Research. Alary is a Fellow of the Canadian Academy of Health Sciences and a founding member of the Canadian Association for HIV Research (CAHR).

== Education ==
Alary received his Diploma of College Studies in 1970, Doctorate in Medicine in 1974, and License from the Medical Council of Canada in 1975, from Université de Sherbrooke. He then engaged in general practice of family medicine before receiving his Masters and Doctorate degrees in Epidemiology from Université Laval in 1987 and 1991, respectively. After receiving a Fellowship from the National Health Research and Development Program and from the Fonds de la Recherche en Santé du Québec, Alary moved to Belgium and was associated with Institute of Tropical Medicine as a Post-doctoral fellow from 1991 till 1992.

== Career ==
Alary started his career as a family physician in various institutions from 1975 till 1983. He joined Université Laval in 1986 as a teaching assistant and a lecturer in the Department of Social and Preventive Medicine. He was promoted to assistant professor in 1992, to associate professor in 1996 and to professor in 2000.

Alary has served as a medical advisor at Hôpital du Saint-Sacrement, Centre de santé publique de Québec, Institut national de santé publique du Québec and Ministère de la santé et des services sociaux du Québec. He also has considerable experience in international health projects.

Along with his academic positions, Alary has also held several administrative appointments. He directed the Epidemiology Research Group of Université Laval from 1998 till 2000 and then served as a Director of STD/AIDS Scientific Group at Institut national de santé publique du Québec till 2001. He is the director of population health research at the Research Centre of the CHU de Quebec – Université Laval. Alary is an External Scholar at Dalhousie University in Nova Scotia.

== Research ==
Alary's research is focused primarily on HIV and STD prevention. He has conducted epidemiologic and prevention research on blood-borne infections and STDs among the most vulnerable populations in both developing and developed countries.

=== Epidemiological study on HIV infection ===
During his post-doctoral fellowship at Institute of Tropical Medicine from 1991 till 1992, Alary performed an epidemiological study on HIV infection in European female sex workers (FSWs) and presented population data to show that the use of petroleum-based lubricants was associated with a higher prevalence of HIV infection. His research outcomes led to the reinforcement of prevention programs aimed at FSWs in Europe regarding the promotion of water-based lubricants. During his Fellowship, he also conducted research on the STI-HIV interaction and the low and middle-income countries (LMICs). His research indicated that other STDs increase the risk of HIV sexual transmission, and that HIV incidence can be decreased by controlling the STDs.

His research in the early 1990s indicated that amoxycillin was an appropriate treatment for genital infections caused by Chlamydia trachomatis in pregnant women. He compared amoxicillin and erythromycin in a double blinded and randomized study. The results from the experiment led to the inclusion of amoxicillin as one of the recommended treatments for Chlamydia trachomatis as whereas cure rates were similar in both groups when treatment was completed, there were more women stopping their treatment with erythromycin because of side effects.

From 1996 to 2003, Alary led the Omega Cohort Study on HIV infection in men who have sex with men (MSM) in Montreal. This study made a significant contribution in the field of participatory research. Indeed, the implication of the MSM community in all aspects of this study helped to form the basis for the development of the community-based HIV research program at the Canadian Institutes of Health Research.

=== Syndromic Approach ===
During his tenure as an assistant professor at Laval University, Alary focused on clinical manifestations of non-ulcerative STIs, especially in women. His work led to the development of the syndromic approach for the diagnosis and treatment of STIs in developing countries. He was involved in the development of the World Health Organization guidelines that recommended the use of this approach in LMICs. He applied the criteria of sensitivity and specificity to evaluate a screening algorithm regarding STD's in female sex workers. His research highlighted the constraints in the screening of STD in developing countries.

=== HIV and HCV prevention ===
Form the mid 1990s till now, Alary led a longitudinal study about HIV and HCV prevalence and incidence among people who inject drugs (PWID) in the province of Quebec. His work has been used extensively by Quebec's health authorities and community groups involved in HIV prevention among PWID. He has also contributed to a meta-analysis linking imprisonment to increased HIV and HCV incidence. His research indicated that that imprisonment was a strong risk factor for incident HIV and HCV among PWID. Alary's research about HIV prevention and intervention in the sex work environment in Benin and other West African countries, contributed to the understanding of the central role played by FSWs, their clients and other male sexual partners in the spread of HIV in most developing countries.

In early 2000s, Alary conducted a research in Benin, about the management of sexually transmitted diseases and HIV prevention in men at high risk. He studied the level of effectiveness of outreach methodology used in contacting sexual partners of FSWs in order to prevent HIV or STDs. His research contributed in convincing the global HIV community about the importance of HIV prevention programming in the sex work environment for maximum impact on the overall HIV epidemic.

Alary has also been involved in the search for new HIV prevention methods under women's control. He conducted placebo-controlled trials of an HIV entry inhibitor that was formulated as vaginal gel. After studying the experiment results and the primary and secondary end points, it was found that the use of cellulose sulfate increased the risk of HIV acquisition instead of preventing the infection.

Alary conducted a prospective observational demonstration study regarding HIV prevention among FSWs in Benin. His study provided the required data about the key indicators such as uptake, retention and adherence, in context of early antiretroviral therapy and the pre-exposure prophylaxis (PrEP). The research outcomes indicated that early antiretroviral therapy was a better suited intervention in terms of retention and adherence indicators.

=== Research regarding Avahan ===
From 2004 until 2014, Alary was appointed as the principal investigator for the evaluation of Avahan; a project regarding the in depth study of nature and heterogeneity of HIV transmission in India. He conducted a systemic review and meta-analysis of the observational studies regarding the transmission risk of HIV-1 during heterosexual contact. According to Alary, there is a greater need to study of various differences and to quantify the infectivity in low-income countries. During his appointment for Avahan, Alary developed a new approach for the impact evaluation of HIV prevention programs outside the context of randomized trials. His proposed approach combined serial observational data and mathematical modelling along with the use of tailor-made transmission dynamics models and Bayesian framework. He explained the various components of the presented framework along with the pros and cons associated with it.

== Awards and honors ==
- 2008 – Mark Wainberg Lecturer Award, Canadian Association for HIV Research
- 2014 – Diamond Award for clinical research, CHU de Québec
- 2015 – Researcher Emeritus Award, Réseau de recherche en santé des populations du Québec
- 2016 – Nominated Fellow of Canadian Academy of Health Sciences.
- 2017 – Vic Neufeld Mentorship Award in Global Health Research, Canadian Coalition of Global Health Research
- 2019 – Trailblazer Award in Population and Public Health Research, Canadian Institutes of Health Research
- 2020 – Graduate emeritus award, Fondation de l'Université Laval

== Selected articles ==
- Laga M, Alary M, Nzila N, Manoka AT, Tuliza M, Behets F, Goeman J, St Louis M, Piot P. Condom promotion, sexually transmitted diseases treatment, and declining incidence of HIV-1 infection in female Zairian sex workers. Lancet 1994; 344:246–248.
- Van Damme L, Ramjee G, Alary M, Vuylsteke B, Chandeying V, Rees H, Sirivongrangson P, *Mukenge-Tshibaka L, Ettiègne-Traoré V, Uaheowitchai C, Karim SSA, Mâsse B, Perriëns J, Laga M, on behalf of the COL-1492 study group. Effectiveness of COL-1492, a nonoxynol-9 vaginal gel, on HIV-transmission among female sex workers. Lancet 2002;360:971-7.
- Van Damme L, Govinden R, Mirembe FM, *Guédou F, Solomon S, Becker ML, Pradeep BS, Krishnan AK, Alary M, Pande B, Ramjee G, Deese J, Crucitti T, Taylor D, for the CS study group. Lack of effectiveness of cellulose sulfate gel for the prevention of vaginal HIV transmission. N Engl J Med 2008; 359:463-72.
- Boily MC, Baggaley RF, Wang L, Masse B, White RG, Hayes RJ, Alary M. Heterosexual risk of HIV1 infection per sexual act: a systematic review and meta-analysis of observational studies. Lancet Infect Dis 2009;9:118–129.
- Mboup A, Béhanzin L, Guédou FA, Geraldo N, Goma-Matsétsé E, Giguère K, Aza-Gnandji M, Kessou L, Diallo M, Kêkê RK, Bachabi M, Dramane K, Geidelberg L, Cianci F, Lafrance C, Affolabi D, Diabaté S, Gagnon MP, Zannou DM, Gangbo F, Boily MC, Vickerman P, Alary M. Early antiretroviral therapy and daily pre-exposure prophylaxis for HIV prevention among female sex workers in Cotonou, Benin: a prospective observational demonstration study. J Int AIDS Soc 2018; 21:e25208.
