= Eric Mark Meslin =

Canadian-American philosopher-bioethicist

Eric M. Meslin PhD FRSC FCAHS (born 20 October 1961) is a Canadian-American philosopher-bioethicist and is the past President and CEO of the Council of Canadian Academies (CCA).

== Education ==
Meslin has a B.A. in philosophy from York University, and both an M.A. and Ph.D. in philosophy (concentration in bioethics) from Georgetown University.

== Academic career ==
Meslin began his academic career as Assistant Professor of Philosophy at University of Toronto (1988-1996). From 2001-2016 he held several positions at Indiana University including Founding Director of the Indiana University Center for Bioethics, Associate Dean of Bioethics at the Indiana University School of Medicine, Endowed Professor of Bioethics, Co-Director, Consortium for Health Policy, Law and Bioethics, Tenured Professor of Medicine and of Philosophy, Professor of Medical and Molecular Genetics, and Professor of Public Health.

Meslin has also held visiting academic positions at Green Templeton College University of Oxford, University of Western Australia, as Pierre de Fermat Chaire d'Excellence at Université de Toulouse/INSERM, and at Department of History and Philosophy of Science, University of Cambridge.

Currently Meslin is adjunct professor at the Dalla Lana School of Public Health, University of Toronto, Senior Fellow at PHG Foundation University of Cambridge, Academic Affiliate at the HeLEX: Centre for Health, Law, and Emerging Technologies, University of Oxford; and Adjunct Professor of Bioethics & Law, Indiana University Robert McKinney School of Law, Center for Law and Health.

== Research ==
Meslin’s research has focused on bioethics aspects of genomics, international health, science policy, and human subjects research, with more than 200 papers, book chapters and other publications, including two co-edited books. His research has been funded by the Social Sciences and Humanities Research Council of Canada, the National Institutes of Health, the Lilly Endowment, and the Richard M Fairbanks Foundation.

== Policy Career ==
Meslin's policy career included positions at National Institutes of Health and American Psychological Association. His work in clinical ethics leadership included positions at the Clinical Ethics Centre, Sunnybrook Health Sciences Centre Sunnybrook Health Sciences Centre, and University of Toronto Joint Centre for Bioethics. From 1996-98 Meslin was Bioethics Research Director in the Ethical, Legal and Social Implications (ELSI) program at the National Human Genome Research Institute during the early years of the Human Genome Project, and from 1998-2001 he was Executive Director of the National Bioethics Advisory Commission appointed by President Bill Clinton. NBAC was responsible for providing advice to the White House and Congress on key topics including stem cell research, international clinical trials, research involving human participants, biobanking, and cloning among others. Since 2016, Meslin has been President and CEO of the Council of Canadian Academies, a non-partisan organization that convenes experts from across Canada and abroad to evaluate the best available evidence on complex scientific topics of public interest at the request of the Government of Canada and other sponsors. CCA was founded by Royal Society of Canada, Canadian Academy of Health Sciences, Canadian Academy of Engineering in 2005.

He has been a member of advisory committees and boards of diverse institutions including the World Health Organization, Canadian Ditchley Foundation Human Research Accreditation Canada, International Electrotechnical Commission, Pierre Eliot Trudeau Foundation, UNESCO, Canadian Institutes of Health Research, the National Academy of Sciences, Engineering, Medicine, UK Biobank, CDC, ESOF, Stem Cell Network, and Genome Canada.

== Awards ==
He is an elected Fellow of the Royal Society of Canada, the Canadian Academy of Health Sciences, a Chevalier de L’Order Nationale du Mérite conferred by the Government of France, and a Hastings Center Fellow.
