= Science Council of Canada =

- Formation: 1966
- Dissolved: 1993

The Science Council of Canada (SCC) was a Canadian governmental advisory board existing from 1966 to 1993. It originally had 25 scientists and senior civil servants, later expanded to 40 natural and physical scientists, with the civil servants removed.

It published a number of reports on various topics, according to the agendas of the individuals on the SCC. An archive of the reports is maintained by the Institute for Science, Society and Policy at the University of Ottawa.

The SCC served, to some extent, similar functions as the former President's Scientific Advisory Committee (PSAC) and the Office of Technology Assessment (OTA) in the United States.

== Chairs ==
- Omond Solandt, Roger Gaudry, Josef Kates, Claude Fortier, Stuart Lyon Smith, Geraldine Kenney-Wallace, Janet Halliwell.
