= Benjamin Alarie =

Canadian law professor (born 1977)

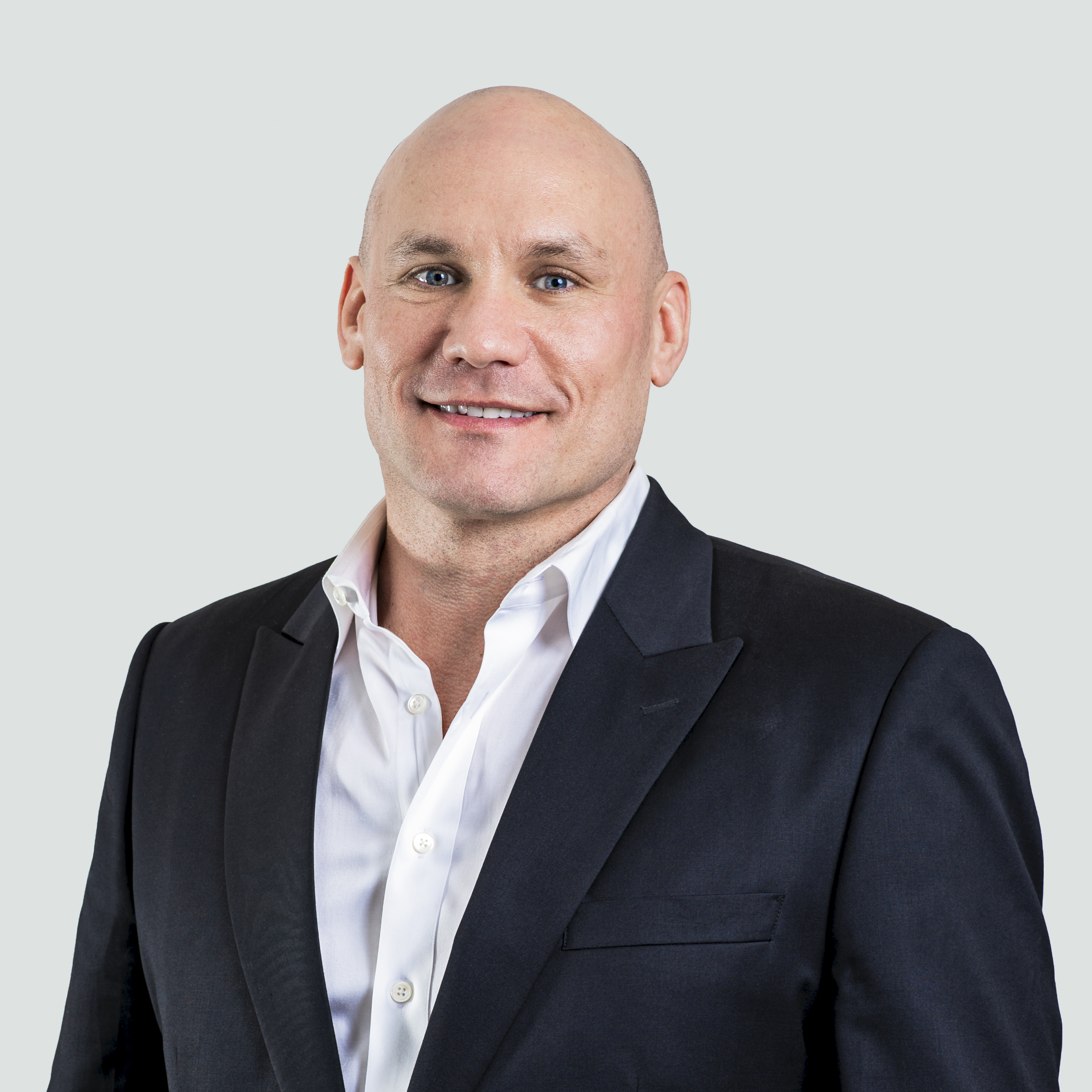
- Born: October 27, 1977 (age 49); Kitchener, Ontario, Canada
- Education: Wilfrid Laurier University (BA); University of Toronto (MA, JD); Yale University (LLM)
- Occupations: Legal scholar, entrepreneur
- Employer(s): Blue J, University of Toronto

Benjamin Alarie (born October 27,1977) is a Canadian legal scholar and entrepreneur. He is a co-founder and CEO of Blue J, a company that develops artificial intelligence tools for tax research. Alarie also serves as professor at the University of Toronto Faculty of Law, where he also holds the Osler Chair in Business Law. His academic work focuses on taxation, judicial decision-making, and the application of artificial intelligence to law, with particular emphasis on taxation and fiscal federalism.

== Education ==
Alarie earned a Bachelor of Arts degree from Wilfrid Laurier University, a public university in Waterloo, in 1999. He subsequently enrolled at the University of Toronto, where he was a junior fellow at Massey College. In 2002, he completed a Master of Arts in economics and a Juris Doctor degree with honours from the University of Toronto. Alarie continued his legal studies at Yale Law School, receiving his Master of Laws (LL.M.) in 2003.

== Career ==
=== Law practice and academic career ===
Alarie’s scholarly research examines taxation law, judicial behavior, and the practical implications of artificial intelligence in legal decision-making. In 2003, Alarie began his legal career as a law clerk for Madam Justice Louise Arbour at the Supreme Court of Canada.

In 2004, Alarie joined the University of Toronto’s Faculty of Law as a full-time professor. He has taught courses in tax law, constitutional law, and law and technology, and was awarded the Alan Mewett QC Prize for excellence in teaching by the law school’s graduating class in 2009. Alarie is also an affiliated faculty member of the Vector Institute for Artificial Intelligence and the Schwartz Reisman Institute.

He is a co-author of several editions of a textbook on tax law, Canadian Income Tax Law. In 2016, he introduced the concept of the “legal singularity,” describing the potential for artificial intelligence to improve the coherence and consistency of legal systems.

He later co-authored the peer-reviewed books Commitment and Cooperation on High Courts (Oxford University Press, 2017) and The Legal Singularity: How Artificial Intelligence Can Make Law Radically Better (University of Toronto Press, 2023). These publications examine themes of artificial intelligence, institutions, and justice. Alarie is under contract with Oxford University Press to publish his third university-press monograph, Superjustice, forthcoming in 2026.

=== Blue J ===
In 2015, Alarie co-founded Blue J, alongside Brett Janssen, Anthony Niblett and Albert Yoon. Blue J is a Toronto-based company focused on applying artificial intelligence and machine learning to tax research.

In 2023, Blue J relaunched its platform as a generative AI tax research tool designed to provide citation-backed answers grounded in authoritative tax sources. By 2025, the platform was used by more than 4,000 organizations, including firms such as KPMG UK, Crowe, Larson Gross, and RCM, as well as several Fortune 500 companies.

A central component of Blue J’s platform is its licensed content library, which includes agreements with Tax Analysts (publisher of Tax Notes) and IBFD, enabling access to U.S. and international tax materials covering more than 220 jurisdictions.

In August 2025, Blue J raised a $122 million Series D funding round led by Sapphire Ventures and Oak HC/FT. The funding supported continued product development and international expansion. That same year, Blue J was named one of Accounting Today’s Top Apps for Accountants.

In September 2025, Blue J co-authored the AI Tax Research Solution Outlook Report in partnership with CPA.com, examining trends in the adoption of artificial intelligence in tax accounting.

== Notable publications ==
- Benjamin Alarie, Abdi Aidid, "The Legal Singularity: How Artificial Intelligence Can Make Law Radically Better"
- Benjamin Alarie, Andrew Green, Commitment and Cooperation on High Courts"
- Benjamin Alarie, Samuel Becher, "Superjustice," forthcoming 2026
- Benjamin Alarie, Anthony Niblett, Albert H Yoon, "How artificial intelligence will affect the practice of law"
- Benjamin Alarie, Anthony Niblett, Albert H Yoon, "Law in the future"
- Benjamin Alarie, "The path of the law: Towards legal singularity"
- Duff, David; Alarie, Benjamin (2006). Canadian Income Tax Law (2nd ed.). LexisNexis. ISBN 978-0-433-45416-8.
- Alarie, Benjamin; Green, Andrew J. (2017). Commitment and Cooperation on High Courts. Oxford University Press. ISBN 978-0-19-939759-4.
- Benjamin Alarie, "Turning Standards into Rules Part 1: Using Machine Learning to Predict Tax Outcomes"
- Benjamin Alarie, "Turning Standards into Rules Part 2: How Do Financial Risk Factors Affect Debt vs. Equity Determinations?"
- Benjamin Alarie, "Turning Standards into Rules—Part 3: Behavioral Control Factors in Employee vs. Independent Contractor Decisions"
- Benjamin Alarie, "Turning Standards into Rules Part 4: Machine Learning and Economic Substance"
- Benjamin Alarie, "Turning Standards into Rules—Part 5: Weighing the Factors in Capital Gains vs. Ordinary Income Decisions"
- Benjamin Alarie, "The Path of the Law: Toward Legal Singularity"
- Benjamin Alarie and David Duff, "The Legacy of UK Tax Concepts in Canadian Income Tax Law" [2008] British Tax Review 228.
- Benjamin Alarie, "Mutual Misunderstanding in Contract" (2009) 46(4) American Business Law Journal 531.
- Benjamin Alarie and Andrew James Green, "The Reasonable Justice: An Empirical Analysis of Justice Frank Iacobucci's Career on the Supreme Court of Canada" (2007) 57 University of Toronto Law Journal 195.
- Benjamin Alarie and Andrew James Green, "Policy Preference Change and Appointments to the Supreme Court of Canada" (2009) 47(1) Osgoode Hall Law Journal
