= Alberto Alari =

Italian footballer (born 1999)

Personal information
- Date of birth: 21 September 1999 (age 27)
- Place of birth: Calcinate, Italy
- Height: 1.88 m (6 ft 2 in)
- Position: Centre-back

Team information
- Current team: Varesina
- Number: 14

Youth career
- –2018: Atalanta

Senior career*
Years	Team	Apps	(Gls)
2018–2022	Atalanta	0	(0)
2018–2019	→ Carrarese (loan)	5	(0)
2019–2020	→ Südtirol (loan)	7	(0)
2020–2021	→ Ravenna (loan)	30	(0)
2021–2022	→ Pergolettese (loan)	17	(0)
2022–2023	Dolomiti Bellunesi	29	(0)
2023–2024	Rotonda	31	(1)
2024–2025	Roma City	25	(0)
2025	Pro Palazzolo	9	(0)
2025–	Varesina	17	(0)

International career
2017	Italy U18	2	(0)
2018	Italy U19	1	(0)
2018	Italy U20	1	(0)
- * Club domestic league appearances and goals as of 2 August 2026

Alberto Alari (born 21 September 1999) is an Italian football player who plays as a centre-back for Serie D club Varesina.

== Club career ==
=== Atalanta ===
He is a product of Atalanta youth teams and played for their Under-19 squad beginning in the 2016–17 season.

==== Loan to Carrarese ====
On 6 July 2018, Alari joined to Serie C club Carrarese on a season-long loan. On 29 October he made his professional debut in Serie C for Carrarese, as a starter, in a 0–0 away draw against Pontedera, he was replaced by Giacomo Rosaia after 86 minutes. Five days later, on 4 November, he played his first entire match for the team, a 3–0 home win over Albissola. Alari ended his season-long loan to Carrarese with only 5 appearances, including 4 entire matches and all as a starter, however he remain an unused substitute 36 times during this season at Carrarese.

==== Loan to Südtirol ====
On 12 July 2019, Alari was loaned to Serie C side Südtirol on a season-long loan deal. On 25 September he made his debut for the club as a substitute replacing Daniele Casiraghi in the 83rd minute of a 3–0 home win over Fermana. On 1 December he played his first match as a starter for the club, a 1–0 home defeat against Vicenza Virtus, he was replaced by Niccolò Romero in the 82nd minute. Two weeks later, on 15 December, he played his first entire match for the club, a 2–0 home defeat against Piacenza. Alari ended his season-long loan to Südtirol with only 6 appearances, however he remained an unused substitute for 25 other matches.

==== Loan to Ravenna ====
On 5 September 2020, Alari was signed by Serie C club Ravenna on a season-long loan deal. Three weeks later, on 27 September, he made his debut for the club in a 2–1 home defeat against Südtirol, he played the entire match. He became Ravenna's first-choice early in the season. Alari ended his season-long loan to Ravenna with 31 appearances, including 26 of them as a starter, however Ravenna was relegated after having lose 4–0 on aggregate in the play-out against Legnago Salus, he played only the return match as a substitute.

==== Loan to Pergolettese ====
On 11 July 2021, Alari joined Pergolettese in Serie C on loan for the 2021–22 season.

=== Serie D ===
On 21 July 2022, Alari signed with Serie D club Dolomiti Bellunesi.

== International career ==
He was first called up to represent his country in February 2017, for an Italy national under-18 football team friendly. He was later called up into the Under-19 and Under 20 squads, also for friendlies.

== Career statistics ==
=== Club ===
As of 16 July 2021

Club	Season	League			Cup		Europe		Other		Total	
Club	Season	League	Apps	Goals	Apps	Goals	Apps	Goals	Apps	Goals	Apps	Goals
Carrarese (loan)	2018–19	Serie C	5	0	0	0	—		—		5	0
Südtirol (loan)	2019–20	Serie C	6	0	0	0	—		—		6	0
Ravenna (loan)	2020–21	Serie C	30	0	0	0	—		1 (Note: All appearance(s) in Serie C play-out.)	0	31	0
Career total			41	0	0	0	—		1	0	42	0
