= Eugene Fechet =

American diplomat

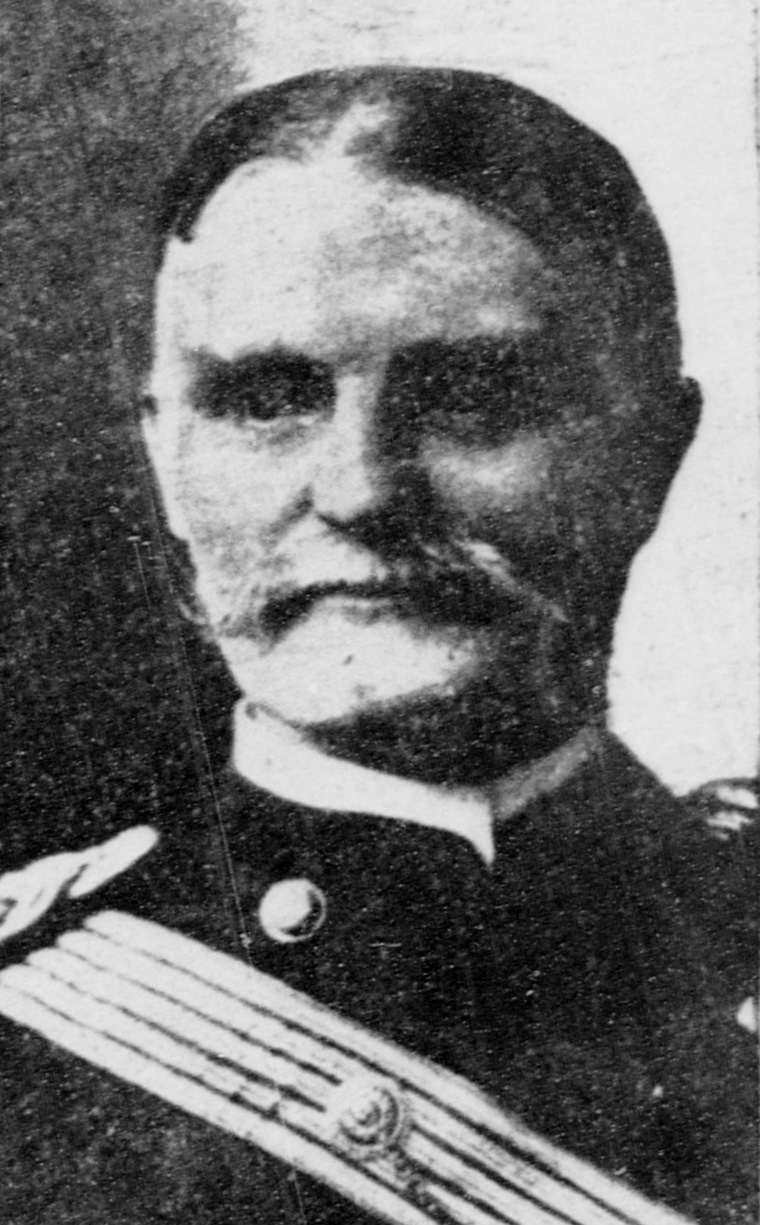

Eugene Oscar Fechet (14 March 1846 in Port Huron, Michigan – 15 January 1925), was a United States Army officer who served in the American Civil War, Spanish–American War and in the Egyptian Army.

== Family ==
Eugene was the son of medical doctor Alfred Edmond Féchet de Alary and Mary de Garmo Buel. Alfred Edmond Féchet de Alary had studied medicine and surgery at the medical school at Tours, received his degree from the University of France, then undertook a post graduate course from the University of Heidelberg. He was then commissioned a medical officer in the Armée d'Afrique in Algiers. He was exiled due to his being a supporter of the unsuccessful coup of Napoleon III and arrived in the United States in 1840. Due to his experience he was commissioned a United States Army Surgeon and was attached to a battery of the 4th Artillery Regiment fighting the Second Seminole War. His battery was later assigned to Fort Gratiot, Michigan where he was granted a piece of land in Michigan due to his war service. He married Mary Buel on 21 Feb 1843.

Eugene was the brother of Lt Colonel Edmond Gustav Fechet (11 Jul 1844 – 16 Nov 1910) and uncle of Major General James Fechet. He was the father of Colonel d'Alary Fechet (1890–1965). Eugene married Mary Emily Montgomery the daughter of Army officer Capt Thomas J Montgomery West Point class of 1845.

== Military career ==
At the start of the American Civil War Eugene's father who had experience with the French Army in Algiers raised a unit that became Battery "B" 1st Regiment Michigan Light Artillery. Eugene enlisted as a Corporal in the unit on 10 September 1861; his regiment departed to St. Louis, Missouri on 17 December 1861. Battery "B" performed duties in the District of West Tennessee till March 1862 until it was attached to General Stephen A. Hurlbut's 4th Division, Army of the Tennessee to April, 1862. The Regiment moved to Pittsburg Landing, Tenn. During the Battle of Shiloh on 6–7 April, Fechet's Battery was overwhelmed and he was captured on April 6, 1862. The prisoners were later exchanged in November 1862

Promoted during his captivity to the rank of Sergeant, Eugene reenlisted in a Veteran Volunteer Regiment as a First Sergeant on 23 December 1863 until he was discharged on 10 April 1864 to attend the United States Military Academy at West Point.

Fechet graduated and was commissioned a 2nd lieutenant, 2nd Artillery Regiment on 15 June 1868. His first posting was Fort Kodiak in the Alaska Territory from 23 November 1868 to February 1870. He then participated in the geographic survey of the Salt River Pima-Maricopa Indian Community Reservation. During the early 1870s he served at the Presidio of San Francisco and Fort Stevens, Oregon.

Whilst still on active service, General William Tecumseh Sherman granted 2nd Lt Fechet a leave of absence to join the Army of the Khedivate of Egypt. He became a Chef de l'Escadron and also Chief of Signals and Chief of Reconnaissance and Survey from 24 October 1872 to 14 February 1874. He achieved the rank of Binbashi and was later promoted to Qaimaqam. During this period Fechet conducted geographical surveys in Nubia and the Sudan where he selected Aswan as the most suitable site to construct a dam to control the Nile River.

Fechet returned to the United States. Discouraged by a lack of further promotion in the Regular Army, he resigned his commission on 15 March 1875.

== Mining, diplomacy and a return to the Army ==
From 1875 to 1898 Fechet travelled to Mexico and Venezuela, where he went mining. In 1884 he became United States Consul to Paso Del Norte (now known as Ciudad Juarez), Mexico. and from 1889 to 1893 was US Consul in Piedras Negras, Coahuila.

At the start of the Spanish–American War, the Congress of the United States authorised 31 Signal Corps volunteer officers to be engaged for the war to supplement the 10 Regular Army Signal officers. Fechet returned to the colours where he was commissioned a Major of the Signal Corps, United States Volunteers on 30 May 1898. He was discharged on 17 April 1899 but was commissioned a Captain of the Signal Corps in the Regular Army on 2 February 1901. Posted to the Philippines, from 1901 to 1902 and 1906 to 1908, Fechet became chief signal officer of the Philippines. He was promoted to major on 22 August 1905 and retired as a lieutenant colonel on 14 March 1910.

An effort from the State of Michigan to have him promoted to brigadier general was denied by President Taft, who objected it would start a precedent of promotions due to political efforts.

At the time of Fechet's retirement, he was only one of four officers in the Regular Army who had served in the Civil War; Brigadier General Charles Morton, Major General Charles L. Hodges and Major General John Clem were the others.
