= Council of Canadian Academies =

Canadian non-profit academic assessment corporation

- Conseil des académies canadiennes
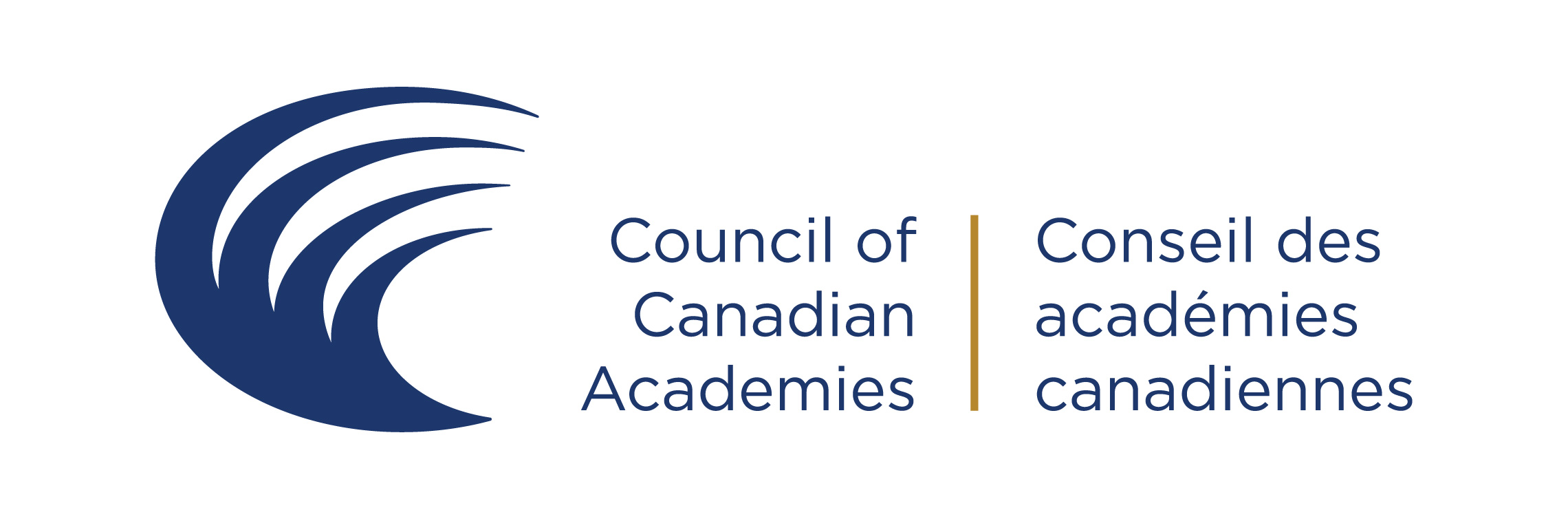
- Abbreviation: CCA / CAC
- Formation: 2002
- Type: Non-governmental organization (NGO)
- Purpose: Expert assessments of existing evidence
- Headquarters: 180 Elgin St., Suite 1401 Ottawa, Ontario K2P 2K3
- Region served: Canada
- Official language: English; French
- President and CEO: Tijs Creutzberg
- Staff: 21 (2025)
- Website: cca-reports.ca

The Council of Canadian Academies (CCA) (French: Conseil des académies canadiennes, CAC) is a private, non-profit corporation that was created to perform independent, expert assessments of the science that is relevant to important public issues.

The CCA received a C$30 million founding grant in 2005 from the Government of Canada. The CCA's assessment scope includes the natural, social and health sciences, engineering and the humanities. The grant supported core operations for 10 years and was renewed twice, in 2015 with an additional $15 million for five years and in 2018 with an additional $9 million for three years starting in 2020–2021.

In 2023, it was provided with C$17.7 million renewed funding through the Strategic Science Fund.

== History ==
A proposal for a formal structure for “Providing Independent Expert Advice to Government and the Public" was prepared by the Royal Society of Canada in 2000. This led to the incorporation of the Canadian Academies of Science in April 2002 by three founding member academies: The Royal Society of Canada, the Canadian Academy of Engineering, and the Canadian Institute of Academic Medicine (subsequently to evolve into the Canadian Academy of Health Sciences).

Activities began in 2006 and in June 2006 the Canadian Academies of Science was renamed to Council of Canadian Academies. The first formal evaluation of the CCA by Innovation, Science, and Economic Development Canada took place in 2018. Recommendations focused on the proposal process, timeliness, and dissemination of reports.

In 2023, two of the three founding academies, The Royal Society of Canada (RSC) and the Canadian Academy of Health Sciences (CAHS), discontinued their membership.

== Governance ==
The CCA is governed by a 12-member Board of Directors. Howard Alper served as first board chair. The current Chair is Soheil Asgarpour.

The CCA also has a Scientific Advisory Committee, whose role is to advise the Board on assessment topic selection, terms of reference, the selection of expert panelists, and peer review. The current Chair is Maydianne Andrade.

=== Presidents ===
- Peter J. Nicholson was appointment as the first President on February 8, 2006 and served to the end of 2009.
- Elizabeth Dowdeswell was president from April 2010 to September 2014.
- Janet Bax was interim President from October 2014 to January 31, 2016.
- Eric M. Meslin was president from February 1, 2016 to December 31, 2023.
- Tijs Creutzberg is president as of July 2024.

== Assessments ==
The CCA's assessments are performed by independent panels of qualified experts from Canada and abroad who serve pro bono. This model has been employed in other countries, most notably in the United States by the National Research Council of the US National Academies. Assessments are published as panel consensus reports. The first Director of Assessments was Marc Saner. All CCA assessments are published and made available to the public free of charge in English and French.

== Reports ==
The first report of the CCA, The State of Science and Technology in Canada, was released September 12, 2006. Since then, the CCA has published over 50 additional assessments.

In January 2023, the CCA published Fault Lines, a report prepared for Innovation, Science and Economic Development Canada (ISED) by the organization's Expert Panel on the Socioeconomic Impacts of Science and Health Misinformation. The report provides an analysis of the landscape of "misinformation" and "disinformation" during the COVID-19 pandemic in Canada, suggesting that the vaccine hesitancy experienced by 2.3 million Canadians led to at least 2,800 deaths and $300 million in hospital expenses. Funding for the report was provided by the Government of Canada.

== See also ==
- Royal Society of Canada
- Canadian Academy of Engineering
- Canadian Academy of Health Sciences
