= Institute for Science, Society and Policy =

- Institut de recherche sur la science, la société et la politique publique
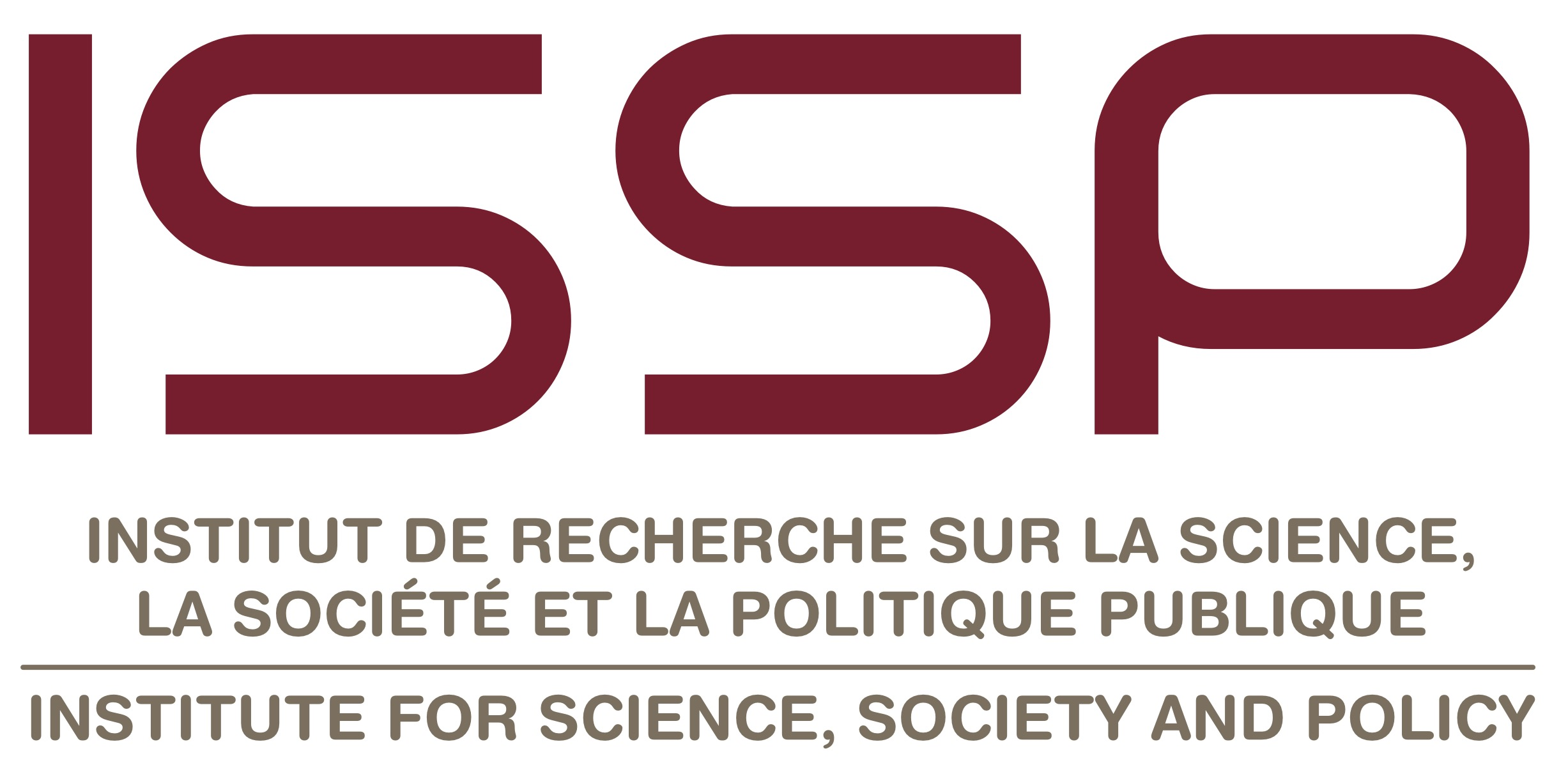
- Formation: 2010
- Type: University Institute
- Headquarters: Ottawa, Canada
- Website: https://issp.uottawa.ca

The Institute for Science, Society and Policy (ISSP) is a multi-disciplinary unit at the University of Ottawa, Canada. It has a teaching, research and outreach mandate in the fields of science, technology and society. It also uses the French name Institut de recherche sur la science, la société et la politique publique.

== History ==
The ISSP was founded based on an initiative of David Castle, Canada Research Chair in Science and Society at the University of Ottawa from 2006 to 2010. Its operations started in 2010 with the hiring of the Inaugural Director, Marc Saner who headed the ISSP until 2015 when its first graduate program was launched. The current director is Monica Gattinger.

== About the ISSP ==
The Institute for Science, Society and Policy has participation of scholars from six different faculties. Located in Ottawa, it also draws on connections in the public service as well as diplomatic and political circles. It hosted, for example, David Willetts, then Minister of State for Universities and Science of the United Kingdom (in 2014) and secured high-level endorsement for its 2013 Innovation Decalogue.

The ISSP holds numerous events examining current issues at the intersection of science and policy. It also provides information services such as the archives of the Science Council of Canada (1966-1992) and the Council of Science and Technology Advisors (1996-2006). Its knowledge mobilization services include a series of reports on the science policy interface.
