= Allary =

Allary may refer to:

- Allary Éditions, French publishing house
- Allary, an alternative name for the Azerbaijani village Alar, Jalilabad
