= Legal singularity =

Hypothetical future with AI-designed laws

A legal singularity is a hypothetical future point in time beyond which the law is much more completely specified, with human lawmakers and other legal actors being supported by rapid technological advancements and artificial intelligence (AI), leading to a vast reduction in legal uncertainty.

The legal singularity is based on the idea that as AI systems become more advanced, they will be capable of processing and analyzing vast amounts of legal data and case law more quickly and accurately than humans. This could potentially lead to a situation where AI systems become the primary legal decision-makers, and humans are relegated to a more supervisory role, if any role at all.

There is much debate around whether the legal singularity is possible or desirable among legal scholars, ethicists, and AI researchers. While some see it as a potential way to improve legal efficiency and reduce bias, others are concerned about the potential for AI systems to lead to decisions that violate fundamental human rights or perpetuate existing inequalities.
