= McAlary =

McAlary is a surname. Notable people with the surname include:

- Max McAlary (1929–2025), Australian wrestler
- Mike McAlary (1957–1998), American journalist
- Shirley McAlary (fl. 1995), Canadian politician

== See also ==
- McClary
