= Alarie =

Alarie is a French surname. Notable people with this name include:

- Bella Alarie (born 1998), American basketball player; daughter of Mark Alarie
- Benjamin Alarie (born 1977), Canadian legal scholar, law professor, and entrepreneur
- Donald Alarie (born 1945), Canadian writer
- Elissa Alarie (born 1986), Canadian rugby player
- Hélène Alarie (1941–2023), Canadian politician
- Mark Alarie (born 1963), American basketball player
- Pierre Alarie, Canadian ambassador
- Pierrette Alarie (1921–2011), Canadian opera singer
