= Canadian Academy of Health Sciences =

Academy of Health Sciences in Canada

- Formation: 2004
- Founder: Martin Schechter
- Type: Professional association
- Headquarters: Ottawa, Ontario
- Location: Canada
- Members: Healthcare professionals, Academics
- President: Sioban Nelson
- Website: cahs-acss.ca

The Canadian Academy of Health Sciences (CAHS) is one of three national academies that comprise the Council of Canadian Academies (CCA), the highest honour granted to scholars in Canada. The two other CCA academies are the Royal Society of Canada and the Canadian Academy of Engineering.

The CAHS has two functions: a) To conduct assessments on urgent health matters that affect Canadians; b) to recognize individuals of outstanding achievement in the health sciences through elections to fellowship. CAHS fellows are entitled to use the post-nominal letters FCAHS (Fellow of the Canadian Academy of Health Sciences).
