= HIV drug resistance =

HIV drug resistance occurs when microevolution causes virions to become tolerant to antiretroviral treatments (ART). ART can be used to successfully manage HIV infection, but a number of factors can contribute to the virus mutating and becoming resistant. Drug resistance occurs as bacterial or viral populations evolve to no longer respond to medications that previously worked. In the case of HIV, there have been recognized cases of treatment resistant strains since 1989, with drug resistance being a major contributor to treatment failure.

While global incidence varies greatly from region to region, there has been a general increase in overall HIV drug resistance. The two main types of resistance, primary and induced, differ mostly in causation, with the biggest cause of resistance being a lack of adherence to the specific details of treatment. These newly created resistant strains of HIV may pose a public health hazard as they continue to infect a growing number of people, due to their harder treatments and continued spread within the population. For this reason, the reaction to the expanding strains of resistant HIV has mostly been to increase treatment access and implement other measures to make sure patients stay in care, as well as the attempt to develop a HIV vaccine or cure.

== Mechanisms of resistance ==
HIV is considered resistant when it no longer responds to known forms of treatment. Because currently there is no known cure for HIV, the goal of treatment is to reduce an infected individual's viral load to the point where it is no longer detectable in order to alleviate their symptoms and reduce their risk of infecting others. HIV drug resistance poses an issue because it reduces the possible HIV medications a person can take due to cross resistance. In cross resistance, an entire class of medication is considered ineffective in lowering a patient's HIV viral load because all the drugs in a given class share the same mechanism of action. Therefore, development of resistance to one medication in a class precludes the use of all other medications in the same class.

=== Testing for resistance ===
A blood test can be done to determine which drugs may be effective prior to initiation of treatment or during treatment to ensure resistance has not developed. The testing may also happen again if someone's viral load increases after receiving ART.

The most common kind of resistance testing is the genotypic testing of viral RNA. This method requires the patient to have a plasma viral load over 500 copies/mL to effectively sequence any existing resistant genomes. However, the test can miss resistant genomes that make up less than 5-20% of the viral population. Next-generation sequencing may catch these less frequently occurring genomes, although randomized trials have not verified the efficacy of this method.

=== Types of resistance ===
==== Primary resistance ====
One type of HIV drug resistance is primary resistance. Primary resistance refers to resistance that is not incurred as a result of ART therapy. It is thought that some strains of HIV-1 are naturally resistant to ART drugs, and that the prevalence of these strains varies across the globe. Primary resistance is acquired when an individual's initial infection with HIV comes from an already resistant strain. An individual infected by a resistant strain begins their course of treatment with already limited drug options, which can pose problems later down the line if they develop additional resistance.

==== Induced resistance ====
The other type of HIV drug resistance is induced resistance, which occurs as a result of drug therapy. HIV is a retrovirus that replicates quickly using reverse transcriptase, known for its lack of error correcting mechanisms, resulting in a high mutation rate. Mutations that confer substantial selective advantage to HIV survival can therefore quickly replicate within an individual, creating a new, resistant strain. These mutations accumulate over generations and in populations, resulting in the great genetic variation within populations of HIV, and an increased probability of a virion developing an evolutionary selective advantage over other virions. Natural selection then acts on HIV by selecting for virions with higher fitness, as all others are eventually killed off by drug treatments. The virions that are able to escape the harmful effects of the drug then create an entirely new, drug resistant population. The selected-for virions continue reproducing until the patient's viral load returns to pre-treatment levels, creating a cycle in which treatment is initially successful in reducing the viral load, but becomes less effective as the virus becomes resistant and virion levels once again increase.

Different mutations lead to different kinds of drug resistance. Generally, the mutations prevent the drug from binding to its intended target. The prevalence of each mutation also varies. For example, induced resistance for nucleoside reverse transcriptase inhibitors (NRTIs) is more common than integrase-strand transfer inhibitors (INSTIs) and protease inhibitors (PIs) induced resistance.

=== Causes of resistance ===
==== Importance of drug regimen adherence ====
As previously described, mutations occur as a result of random mutations that are especially prevalent in HIV due to characteristic elements of the viral reproductive process, namely the use of reverse transcriptase. Several mechanisms of resistance have been identified, including mutations that block the incorporation of nucleosides, a class of HIV drug, into the viral DNA.

One known cause of HIV drug resistance is lack of adherence to the prescribed drug regimen. Low levels of adherence can be attributed to lack of access to healthcare, stigmatization of HIV, and a lack of availability of drugs due to prohibitive cost or other factors. Missing doses of medication or taking them late poses a major issue because it can allow for the virus to once again begin to replicate inside the body. Proper adherence also greatly reduces the risk of the spread of the virus, thereby improving general public health and lowering health care spending. Some drugs are known to have lower incidences of resistance and may be preferable for individuals known to have difficulty adhering to a drug routine, but these benefits have to be weighed with the potential risks, including severity of side effects.

== Potential limited effects of current drugs ==
In 2004, one study estimated the percentage of the American HIV positive population with some form of drug resistance to be 76.3%. A more recent study in South Korea estimated that 50% of their HIV positive population had multi-drug resistant strains of HIV, while 10% had multi-class resistant strains. Multi-class resistant strains pose a larger problem because each class includes many drugs, and eliminating use of an entire class of drugs severely limits treatment options. These studies indicate that the incidence of resistance varies greatly based on geographic location.

In their 2017 HIV Drug Resistance Report, the World Health Organization (WHO) conducted surveys in 14 countries to estimate the prevalence of resistance to HIV medications. One subgroup included only HIV-positive patients who had just initiated antiretroviral therapy in order to assess the prevalence of HIV drug resistance in treatment-naive patients, deemed "pretreatment drug resistance." Resistance to non-nucleoside reverse transcriptase inhibitors (NNRTIs), one class of HIV treatments, in this patient population ranged from 2.7% (in Myanmar) to 15.9% (in Uganda). Resistance to NRTIs ranged from 0.3% (in Namibia) to 6.8% (in Nicaragua). Resistance to protease inhibitors ranged from 0.3% (in Cameroon and Myanmar) to 2.6% (in Mexico). Resistance to NNRTI + NRTI combination therapy ranged from 0.2% (in Myanmar) to 4.6% (in Uganda). In the 2024 HIV Drug Resistance Report, the World Health Organization found that the number of HIV patients with primary NNRTI resistance rose to 10%. A patient's prior exposure to ARTs increased the risk of NNRTI resistance three fold.

Dolutegravir (DTG), an INSTI drug, is a WHO-recommended first-line treatment. First-line treatments are the first treatment plan for someone diagnosed with HIV. For patients receiving DTG, 3.9%-8.6% of them (the specific percentage depending on the country) developed DTG resistance. The percentage went up to 19.6% for patients who had tried other ARTs but then transitioned to DTG when they had a high viral load. These resistance rates are higher than what the clinical trials for DTG predicted.

== Contemporary treatment issues ==
Current medical and scientific opinion is mixed on the most effective treatment methods, but is focused on drug cocktails and the importance of first-line regimens. The World Health Organization advocates a public-health approach to HIV treatment in order to make treatment uniform and available to patients around the world. In July 2017, the WHO implemented the Global Action Plan on HIV drug resistance 2017–2021. It was a 5-year initiative intended to help countries around the world manage HIV drug resistance. These efforts continue into 2025 with the adoption of the "Integrated drug resistance action framework for HIV, hepatits B and C and sexually transmitted infections, 2026-2030."

Among treatment methods, the World Health Organization acknowledges the importance of successful first-line treatments. The first treatment plan is known to affect the virus' future response to other treatments, making their effectiveness important. The most successful treatments are combinations of three drugs used simultaneously, as this greatly reduces the probability of the virus developing resistance. Recently, there have been some instances of resistance with combination therapies. In Europe, 5-10% of different patient populations had multi-class resistant HIV while 3% of some patient populations in North America had multi-class resistant HIV.

=== Resistance in those taking PrEP ===
Pre-exposure prophylaxis (PrEP) is a WHO recommended preventative drug for people at-risk of contracting HIV. Those who take it decrease their risk of contracting HIV. However, if PrEP starts during the 2-4 weeks post HIV-exposure, which is the acute stage of HIV infection, higher levels of drug resistance have been observed. From 2020-2023, there were 310 reported cases of people contracting HIV while taking oral tenofovir-containing PrEP. 20% of them had drug-resistant viruses. Some individuals who got HIV while on long acting cabotegravir (CAB-LA) PrEP had mutations that conferred resistance to DTG and other INSTI drugs. Delayed HIV diagnoses may increase the risk of such mutations forming. Lenacapavir, another long-acting PrEP tretament, does not seem to increase the risk of primary drug-resistant mutations in breakthrough infections. Overall, WHO recommends continuing the monitoring for HIV drug resistance in those starting PrEP.

=== HIV resistance in infants ===
The WHO 2024 report on HIV resistance reported one case of DTG-resistant HIV in an infant born to a mother taking DTG. The infant had not received any ART prior to the development of drug resistance. This case prompted the WHO to recommend surveilling infants for drug resistance.

=== ART use in developing countries ===
Shortly after the advent of ART, there was much controversy about how to make the drugs accessible to the developing world in countries where HIV was most widespread. Because of the strict regimen that had to be followed in taking the drugs, critics were hesitant to distribute the drugs in under-resourced countries where they worried patients would be unwilling or unable to follow the regimen. However, studies comparing drug regimen adherence rates between high and low income countries showed that individuals in low income countries were no less likely to correctly follow drug instructions. In one study, 77% of African patients were found to satisfy the standard of adherence, compared to just 55% of North American patients studied. These high adherence rates in resource-poor countries can be attributed to the success of community-based approaches like the HIV Equity Initiative in Haiti, which employed local workers and trained them in how to safely distribute HIV medication, as well as programs such as that in Brazil, in which generic drugs are able to be mass-produced and distributed for little to no cost.

=== Future steps to control HIV resistance ===
The number of people with resistant strains of HIV are growing, making the matter a more pressing issue for health care officials. If current trends continue, infection rates will rise, as will government spending on HIV/AIDS. HIV drug resistance also has the potential to disrupt the progress being made in the global fight against AIDS, such as with the "90-90-90" target to diagnose 90% of cases, provide treatment to 90% of infected individuals, and successfully suppress the viral load in 90% of the treated individuals. New classes of drugs are constantly being researched and produced to help address the issue of resistance, as well as to try to alleviate the steep costs associated with managing HIV. However, the Joint United Nations Programme on HIV/AIDS (UNAIDS) believes that the issue is currently under control, with ART treatment being effective for a majority of patients. Instead, they support research into developing a vaccine or cure as being more central to the mission of reducing the spread of HIV.

== See also ==
- Drug resistance
