= COVID-19 vaccination mandates in Canada =

Mandates for people to receive the COVID-19 vaccine in Canada

COVID-19 vaccination mandates in Canada are the responsibility of provinces, territories, and municipalities, and in the case of federal public services and federally-regulated transportation industries, the federal government. COVID-19 vaccines are taxpayer funded in Canada and made available free of charge through the public health care system. The federal government is responsible for procurement and distribution of the vaccines to provincial and territorial authorities; provincial and territorial governments are responsible for administering vaccinations to people in their respective jurisdictions. Mass vaccination efforts began across Canada on December 14, 2020. As the second vaccinations became more widely available in June 2021, Manitoba became the first province in Canada to offer a voluntary vaccine passport.

As Canada was emerging from the fourth wave in mid-August—which had been dominated by the highly contagious SARS-CoV-2 Delta variant, governments at different levels were considering the use of vaccine mandates.

At the international level, Canada was in dialogue with other member nations of the Group of Seven, with the World Health Organization and the International Civil Aviation Organization to discuss "proof of vaccination for international travel". These "reliable and secure" "proof of vaccination credentials" were often referred to as vaccine passports.

During this same period, at the domestic level an emerging "patchwork" system of vaccine mandates began to be introduced across Canada. In August 2021, a number of public and private entities nationwide began to consider implementing vaccination mandates.

With healthcare capacity spread "too thin" during the "rising fifth wave driven by the Omicron variant" in early January 2022, federal Health Minister Jean-Yves Duclos suggested that provinces implement mandatory COVID-19 vaccinations.

There have been protests against public health restrictions all across Canada. In early 2022, protests against mandates increasingly involved anti-government sentiments, with a blockade and occupation of Parliament Hill occurring in late January and lasting for nearly a month. The protest led to tens of millions in economic costs, including trade and supply chain interruptions, policing costs, business closures, and temporary lay-offs of over a thousand workers. In response, the federal government invoked the Emergencies Act on February 14 for the first time in Canadian history, giving police and other government agencies extraordinary powers to handle the ongoing protests. In January 2024, a Canadian court found that the Trudeau government’s use of the “Emergencies Act” was not justified, and violated the Canadian Constitution.

== Overview ==
During the fourth wave of the pandemic, dominated by the highly contagious SARS-CoV-2 Delta variant, known as "Delta", the first vaccine mandates were introduced in Canada. By mid-August 2021, as Canada was facing a potential surge during the fourth wave of the highly infectious and dangerous Delta variant, vaccinations were available to most adult Canadians, and many Canadians had been vaccinated. As borders were reopening and school terms beginning in the near future, experts called for vaccine mandates. The federal government imposed mandatory vaccinations on federal public servants. By November 2021, with the second winter with COVID-19, health agencies attempted to reach more vaccine-hesitant Canadians.

The Public Health Agency of Canada (PHAC) announced that the number of new Omicron infections had peaked in January 2022. As the fourth wave ended, Canada's Chief Public Health Officer Dr. Theresa Tam said that the world will be grappling with future waves of SARS-CoV-2 virus variants in the "months and years to come"—some of which that "will be quite severe and disruptive." The CPHO said that in the coming weeks "all existing public health policies"—including "provincial vaccine passports"— would have to be "revisited", to avoid being in a "crisis mode" all the time and to address future waves in a "longer-term" "more sustainable way" that will include "capacity building." Sweden—which unlike Canada, has a very high rate of booster vaccinations—will remove all vaccine passports by February 9. While the percentage of Canadians with two vaccinations was quite high, only 50% have received the booster, which limited the effects of COVID-19 complications.

== Federal public service ==
On August 13, 2021, Minister of Intergovernmental Affairs Dominic LeBlanc and Transport Minister Omar Alghabra announced that the federal government plans to mandate the vaccination of all federal public servants, employees in federally-regulated transport industries, and passengers of commercial air travel, interprovincial rail service, and large marine vessels with overnight accommodations (e.g. cruise ships). The government will also "expect" the vaccination of all employees in industries regulated by the Canada Labour Code. That day, the Government of Canada estimated that there were approximately 19,000 employers and 1,235,000 employees (8% of all workers in Canada) subject to the vaccine mandate.

Since October 29, proof of vaccination has been mandatory for employees of federal public services and federally regulated industries, including banking. By early January, in these public sectors, those "without proof, or an exemption on medical or religious grounds, have been put on unpaid leave". A January 27, 2022 CTV News explainer provided an update on current "vaccine mandates and public health restrictions" across Canada. These mandates and restrictions "fall under provincial and territorial jurisdiction" and most are "not federal responsibilities."

== Federal travel ==
The federal government has been in dialogue along with other members of the Group of Seven nations, with the World Health Organization and the International Civil Aviation Organization and others to discuss international issues related to the global pandemic. This includes dialogue on "proof of vaccination for international travel". As Canada was emerging from the fourth wave in mid-August, in order to "support the re-opening of societies and economies" while also reducing the "risk of spread and importation of COVID-19", Canadians needed a "reliable and secure" "proof of vaccination credentials" required by both Canadian and foreign border officials. The ArriveCAN app was introduced for travellers arriving in Canada. The Canada Border Services Agency (CBSA) says that the ArriveCan app has "set the stage" for a new system with technological changes to speed up entry to Canada at the border, starting with major airports. In order to be "eligible for the exemption from quarantine and post-arrival testing requirements", travellers need to submit their proof of vaccination" which includes the option of uploading it to ArriveCAN. By the summer of 2022, the app had become controversial, with border mayors calling for it to be scrapped.

=== Domestic ===
As of November 30, 2021, Canadians who wish to travel domestically on airplanes, cruise ships or by VIA Rail trains have been required to prove they are fully vaccinated against COVID-19

=== Cross-border ===
In October 2021, new United States Department of Homeland Security regulations were released regarding cross-border travel between the Canada and the United States based on guidance from the Centers for Disease Control and Prevention. To prevent supply chain disruptions, the DHS allowed for a window of four months—until January 22, 2022—for Canadian truckers to get fully vaccinated against COVID-19.

On November 19, 2021, the Public Health Agency of Canada announced upcoming adjustments to Canada's border measures. Included in the announced adjustments was the requirement for essential service providers, including truck drivers, to be fully vaccinated after January 15, 2022. The announcement clarified that unvaccinated or partially vaccinated foreign national truck drivers would be prohibited from entering Canada after that date. According to the Canadian Press and CBC, as of January 22, the mandates would impact an estimated 26,000 unvaccinated truckers of the 160,000 truck drivers in both the United States and Canada who regularly cross the border.

== Provinces and territories ==
An October 21, 2021 federal briefing said that the provinces and territories—who hold all of the vaccination information—are responsible for providing the vaccine passport that Canadians need to travel internationally, using "existing provincial proof of vaccination systems". By 2022, all provinces and territories had "vaccine passports with the QR code that meets the recommended Canadian standard for domestic and international travel".

=== Alberta ===
Under the Premiership of Jason Kenney, the province removed the "power of mandatory vaccination from the provinces Public Health Act, to ensure there could not be a vaccine mandate. In May 2021, Premier Kenney promised Albertans the "best summer ever" and on June 18, he announced the government's plans to reopen with a prediction that the pandemic was ending. On July 28 Alberta Chief Medical Officer of Health, Deena Hinshaw, announced sweeping changes during her COVID-19 pandemic update. Hinshaw explained that the increased uptake of vaccinations was one of the factors influencing her decision to gradual remove all restrictions; to decrease testing; and shorten the quarantine period. Kenney took a lengthy holiday overseas in August while cases increased. In mid-September, as Alberta was reaching the peak of daily cases during the fourth wave, the number of active cases reached 20,614—representing the first time the number was greater than 20,000; the daily case count exceeded 1,600, the number of hospitalization was over 1,130. The number of active cases on September 20 was "far more than twice as many as any other province or territory." In mid-September facing criticism on all sides, Premier Kenney introduced his Restrictions Exemption Program (REP)—described by many as a vaccine passport—along with "sweeping new measures to combat the COVID-19 surge." If businesses require their adult patrons to "show proof of vaccination or recent negative test result", they can forego certain other restrictions. By early October 2021, CBC News was citing Alberta as a "cautionary tale for the rest of Canada". The province had made a series of "bad policy decisions"; vaccination rates were low; and the government did nothing. By October 1, a November 30, 2021 deadline had been set by Premier Kenney for approximately "25,500 public service employees" to get vaccinated. In January 2022, Kenney refused to introduce a mandate.

=== British Columbia ===
In an October 5, 2021 update, Provincial Health Officer for British Columbia, Dr. Bonnie Henry and health minister, Adrian Dix, announced a vaccine mandate for public service employees and visitors to many health-care settings. This includes long-term and assisted care.

=== Ontario ===
The Ontario government announced a COVID-19 vaccine certification system that came into effect on 22 September. It was met with protests.

On October 28, 2021, Chief Medical Officer of Health of Ontario Kieran Moore said that Ontario will not integrate a COVID-19 vaccine requirement into the Immunization of School Pupils Act (ISPA) "at present".

On February 10, 2022, the Chief Medical Officer of Health of Ontario, Dr. Kieran Moore, said that there was a "remarkable improvement" in "all of key metrics" in the province that will lead to a review of all COVID-19 "public health measures" which includes "mask mandates and proof of vaccination."

On March 1, 2022, Ontario's COVID-19 vaccine certification system was lifted.

=== Manitoba ===
On June 8, 2021, Manitoba Premier Brian Pallister announced that the province would be providing secure vaccination cards in digital and paper form linked to the provincial health card to be used for proof of vaccination status. Users of this vaccine passport, the first in Canada, faced fewer COVID-19 public health restrictions. By early July, the demand for the paper vaccine passports temporarily overwhelmed the system. At the same time, the province reached a new "marker in the pandemic"—the COVID-19 vaccines supply exceeded "demand on a daily basis."

By early August at the beginning of the fourth wave, case numbers and test positivity rates were declining in Manitoba in spite of the increase in the proportion of cases of Delta. On August 7, 2021, with a majority of eligible Manitobans vaccinated—with 71.4% fully vaccinated, and 80% with the first dose of the vaccine, Premier Pallister introduced his +4-3-2-One Great Summer plan to re-open by lifting restrictions, including the mask mandate.

=== Quebec ===
On August 17, 2021, Premier François Legault announced that healthcare workers in Quebec, both in the private sector and the public sector, would have to be fully vaccinated by October 1, 2021. Workers who do not comply would face suspension without pay and, if applicable, would have their licenses to practice revoked by their provincial medical organization. On September 7, the Minister of Health and Social Services, Christian Dubé, moved the date to October 15. Two days before the mandate was meant to come into effect, the Quebec government again delayed the date by a month, to November 15, 2021, fearing a staffing shortage in Quebec's already strained healthcare system; approximately 17,140 healthcare workers would be at risk of suspension, 5,000 of which were likely to be in direct contact with patients, according to Minister Dubé. Finally, on November 3, the mandate was abandoned altogether. New hires in the healthcare system would still have to be fully vaccinated.

On September 1, 2021, a vaccine passport in the form of a QR code came into effect in Quebec, requiring patrons to be adequately vaccinated in order to gain entry to certain places deemed to be high-risk, including gyms, restaurants, bars, and indoor venues. During the Omicron wave, the passport was expanded to provincial alcohol stores (SAQ), provincial cannabis stores (SQDC). and big-box stores, including Walmart, Costco, and Canadian Tire.

On March 12, 2022, Quebec's vaccine passport system was lifted.

== Private companies and public schools ==
As early as April 2021, nationwide public colleges and universities, private companies, and for-profit long-term care facilities began to consider vaccine mandates.

== Protests ==
There have been a number of protests over responses to the COVID-19 pandemic across Canada. Vaccine mandates and passports became increasingly controversial as the pandemic entered its third year. The largest and most disruptive series of protests, linked with the Canada convoy protest, was originally called the "Freedom Convoy" by its organizers. After protesters had demonstrated for nineteen days on Parliament Hill, in Ottawa, Canada's capital, the three levels of government—municipal, provincial, and national—had invoked three states of emergency for the city. In January 2024, a Canadian Federal court ruled that the government’s use of the “Emergencies Act” to shut down the protest was unreasonable and had violated the Canadian Constitution

== See also ==
- COVID-19 vaccination in Canada
- Vaccine passports during the COVID-19 pandemic
- COVID-19 pandemic in Canada

== Sources ==
- Aldrich, Josh (June 8, 2021). "Vaccination passports available to Manitobans after second shot". Winnipeg Sun.
- Aiello, Rachel (October 21, 2021). "Vaccine passport: Provinces issuing proof for travel". CTV News. Archived from the original on January 27, 2022.
- Amato, Sean (January 7, 2022). "Alberta premier outright refuses federal suggestion of mandatory COVID-19 vaccines". CTV News. Edmonton.
- Anderson, Drew (September 15, 2021). "A reality check on Alberta's path to the devastating 4th wave of COVID". CBC News.
- Bensadoun, Emerald (January 9, 2022). "Is mandatory COVID-19 vaccination coming to Canada? A look at each province and territory's restrictions and vaccine mandate policies". The Globe and Mail.
- Blanchfield, Mike; Taylor, Stephanie (January 24, 2022). "Business groups urge feds to reverse vaccine mandate for cross-border truckers". Global News.
- Cabrera, Holly; Olson, Isaac (August 5, 2021). "Facing onset of 4th wave of COVID-19 infections, Quebec to implement vaccine passport system". CBC News.
- "Everything you need to know about COVID-19 in Alberta on Monday, Sept. 20". CBC News. September 16, 2021.
- "Canadian private long-term care providers announce COVID-19 vaccine mandate for staff". CBC News. The Canadian Press. August 26, 2021.
- "Public Health Agency of Canada involved in 'error' on trucker vaccine rules". CBC News via CP. January 21, 2022.
- "DHS Releases Details for Fully Vaccinated, Non-Citizen Travelers to Enter the U.S. at Land and Ferry Border Crossings". US Department of Homeland Security. US Gov.
- "DHS to Require Non-U.S. Individual Travelers Entering the United States at Land Ports of Entry and Ferry Terminals to be Fully Vaccinated Against COVID-19". US Department of Homeland Security.
- "COVID-19 public health actions". Government of Alberta. September 2021. Overview: Restrictions Exemption Program. Archived from the original on February 5, 2022.
- "Government of Canada announces adjustments to Canada's border measures". Government of Canada. Public Health Agency of Canada. November 19, 2021.
- "Manitoba pausing printing of immunization cards due to 'overwhelming demand'". Global News via Canadian Press. Winnipeg, Manitoba. July 9, 2021.
- "Places and activities requiring the COVID-19 Vaccination Passport". COVID-19 vaccination passport. Gouvernement du Québec. Archived from the original on February 21, 2022.
- "B.C. launches proof of vaccination to stop spread of COVID-19" (Press release). Government of British Columbia. August 23, 2021.
- Herring, Jason (July 28, 2021). "As cases surge, Alberta removes isolation requirements for COVID-19 close contacts". Calgary Herald.
- "How to get your Canadian COVID-19 proof of vaccination". Immigration Refugees and Citizenship Canada. October 21, 2021.
- Kerr, Jaren (August 31, 2021). "Most major accounting firms in Canada to require vaccination for workers in offices". The Globe and Mail.
- Kost, Hannah (September 16, 2021). "What we know about Alberta's new vaccine passport (that's not being called a passport) so far". CBC News.
- Lao, David (August 25, 2021). "Air Canada requiring all employees, new hires to be vaccinated against COVID-19". Global News.
- Lee, Michael (January 27, 2022). "Vaccine mandates: Restrictions by province and territory". CTV News. Archived from the original on January 27, 2022.
- Trosow, Samuel; Lowe, Julie (August 25, 2021). "Canadian colleges and universities can mandate COVID-19 vaccination without violating Charter rights". The Conversation.
- McKendrick, Devon (August 3, 2021). "Capacity limits for businesses, indoor mask mandate to end in Manitoba starting Saturday". Winnipeg. Archived from the original on August 3, 2021.
- Miller, Adam (August 14, 2021). "COVID-19 vaccine mandates are coming — whether Canadians want them or not". CBC News.
- Miller, Adam (October 2, 2021). "Alberta acted like the pandemic was over. Now it's a cautionary tale for Canada". CBC News. Second Opinion.
- Pelley, Lauren (July 31, 2021). "Why the delta variant is spreading COVID-19 so quickly — and what that means for Canada". CBC News.
- "Canada's COVID-19 Immunization Plan: Saving Lives and Livelihoods". Public Health Agency of Canada (PHAC). December 18, 2020.
- Chief Public Health Officer of Canada (December 2021). A Vision to Transform Canada's Public Health System (PDF) (Report). Report on the State of Public Health in Canada. Public Health Agency of Canada. p. 129.
- Nerestant, Antoni (January 6, 2022). "Quebec expands vaccine passports to liquor, cannabis stores, with 3rd dose requirement on the way". CBC News.
- Public health: Ethical issues (PDF). Nuffield Council on Bioethics (Report). London. 2007. p. 255.
- Roffel, Brittany (October 5, 2021). "B.C. mandates COVID-19 vaccines for public service workers and long-term care visitors". CBC News.
- Rocca, Ryan (September 1, 2021). "Protests held after Ontario government announces COVID-19 vaccine certification system". Global News. Archived from the original on September 1, 2021.
- Stevenson, Verity (January 13, 2022). "Quebec premier announces end to curfew Monday, back-to-school plan". CBC News.
- Tasker, John Paul (August 21, 2021). "Federal government to require vaccinations for all federal public servants, air and train passengers". CBC News. Archived from the original on August 13, 2021.
- Tasker, John Paul (February 4, 2022). "Canada needs to adopt a 'more sustainable' approach to COVID-19, Tam says". CBC News.
- "Mandatory COVID-19 vaccination requirements for federally regulated transportation employees and travellers". Transport Canada. October 6, 2021. Archived from the original on January 29, 2022.
- Thompson, Elizabeth (January 24, 2022). "Thanks to new technology, crossing the border is going to get faster and easier". CBC News.
- Tilo, Dexter (October 1, 2021). "Alberta orders public service employees to be vaccinated". Human Resources Director Canada.
- "Government of Canada to require vaccination of federal workforce and federally regulated transportation sector". Treasury Board of Canada Secretariat (Press release). August 13, 2021.
- Trepanier, James (November 25, 2021). "Vaccine Mandates in Historical Context". Canadian Museum of History. Gatineau, Quebec.
- Turnbull, Sarah (August 13, 2021). "Feds to make COVID-19 vaccines mandatory across federal public service". CTV News. Archived from the original on August 20, 2021.
- COVID-19 and mandatory vaccination: Ethical considerations and caveats. Policy Brief. World Health Organization. April 13, 2021.
