= Timeline of the COVID-19 pandemic in Ontario (2022) =

Sequence of major events in a virus pandemic

The following is a timeline of the COVID-19 pandemic in Ontario throughout the first half of 2022 as daily reports were replaced with weekly reports on Thursdays beginning on June 17, 2022.

== Timeline ==
=== January ===
Date	Cases		Recoveries		Deaths		Active	Hospitalizations			Sources
Date	New	Total	New	Total	New	Total	Total	Total	ICU	Ventilators	Sources
1	18,445	774,806	4,769	652,114	12	10,206	-	-	-	-	
2	16,714	791,520	5,901	658,015	16	10,222	-	1,117	-	-	
3	13,578	805,098	6,547	664,562	6	10,229	-	1,232	248	-	
4	11,352	816,450	7,519	672,081	10	10,239	134,130	1,290	266	-	
5	11,582	828,032	11,669	683,750	13	10,252	134,030	2,081	288	-	
6	13,339	841,371	12,036	695,786	20	10,272	135,313	2,279	319	-	
7	11,889	853,270	11,946	707,732	43	10,315	135,223	2,472	338	-	
8	13,362	866,632	12,007	719,739	31	10,345	-	2,594	385	219	
9	11,959	878,591	-	-	29	10,366	-	2,419	412	226	
10	9,706	888,297	6,993	737,396	12	10,378	140,523	-	438	-	
11	7,951	896,248	9,893	747,289	21	10,399	-	3,220	477	-	
12	9,783	906,031	16,106	763,398	46	10,445	-	3,448	505	-	
13	9,909	915,940	19,816	783,214	35	10,480	-	3,630	500	-	
14	10,694	926,904	21,672	804,886	42	10,522	-	2,472	-	-	
15	10,732	937,636	22,870	827,756	42	10,565	-	3,957	558	319	
16	10,450	948,086	-	843,073	40	10,605	-	3,595	579	340	
17	8,521	956,607	8,282	851,365	23	10,628	-	3,887	578	-	
18	4,183	963,693	10,189	861,554	38	10,666	-	3,220	580	-	
19	5,744	969,437	12,891	874,445	60	10,726	-	4,132	589	-	
20	7,757	977,194	12,578	887,023	75	10,801	-	4,061	594	-	
21	7,165	984,359	11,566	898,589	62	10,865	-	4,114	590	-	
22	6,473	990,832	9,944	908,533	47	10,912	-	4,026	600		
23	5,833	996,665	-	-	57	10,968	-	3,797	604	-	
24	4,790	1,001,455	6,924	924,947	36	11,004	-	3,861	615	-	
25	3,424	1,004,879	7,298	932,245	64	11,068	-	4,008	626	-	
26	5,368	1,010,247	9,913	942,158	92	11,160	-	4,016	608	-	
27	5,852	1,016,099	8,637	950,795	70	11,230	-	3,645	599	-	
28	5,337	1,021,436	7,906	958,701	68	11,298	-	3,535	607	-	
29	4,855	1,026,291	6,685	965,386	58	11,354	-	3,439	597	-	
30	3,960	1,030,251	-	-	58	11,412	-	3,019	587	358	
31	3,043	1,033,294	5,098	976,987	32	11,444	-	2,983	583	-	

On January 3, the Ontario Government announced that Ontario would be moving into modified Step 2 from January 5 for a period of at least 21 days (January 26; this may be extended based on public health trends); closing indoor dining, gyms, movie theatres and schools.

=== February ===
Date	Cases		Recoveries		Deaths		Active	Hospitalizations			Sources
Date	New	Total	New	Total	New	Total	Total	Total	ICU	Ventilators	Sources
1	2,622	1,035,916	4,816	981,803	60	11,504	-	3,091	568	-	
2	3,909	1,039,825	4,912	986,715	67	11,576	-	2,939	555	-	
3	4,098	1,043,923	5,901	992,616	75	11,651	-	2,797	541	-	
4	4,047	1,047,970	5,901	998,238	60	11,711	-	2,634	517	-	
5	3,204	1,051,174	4,642	-	59	11,770	-	2,493	141	-	
6	2,887	1,054,061	-	1,054,061	56	11,825	-	2,230	486	289	
7	2,088	1,056,149	3,556	1,010,878	11	11,836	-	2,983	583	-	
8	2,092	1,058,241	3,047	1,014,285	42	11,878	-	2,254	474	-	
9	3,161	1,061,403	4,992	1,019,277	66	11,944	-	2,059	449	-	
10	3,201	1,064,604	4,143	1,023,420	44	11,988	-	1,897	445	-	
11	2,907	1,067,511	3,697	1,027,117	52	12,040	-	1,829	435	-	
12	2,944	1,070,455	3,306	1,030,423	35	12,075	-	1,704	414	267	
13	2,265	1,072,720	3,172	1,033,595	22	12,093	-	1,540	402	244	
14	1,765	1,074,485	2,619	1,036,214	8	12,101	-	1,369	394	-	
15	1,593	1,076,078	2,730	1,076,078	19	12,120	-	1,550	384	-	
16	2,532	1,078,610	3,537	1,042,481	47	12,167	-	1,403	147	-	
17	2,327	1,080,937	3,204	1,045,685	37	12,204	-	1,342	356	-	
18	2,337	1,083,274	2,939	1,048,624	33	12,237	-	1,281	352	-	
19	2,244	1,085,518	-	-	14	-	-	1,191	329	-	
20	1,966	1,087,484	-	-	19	-	-	1,056	324	-	
21	1,335	-	1,914	-	15	-	-	1,064	320	-	
22	1,282	1,090,101	1,997	1,057,829	9	12,288	-	1,038	319	-	
23	1,425	1,091,526	2,071	1,060,530	19	12,306	-	1,106	319	-	
24	2,404	1,093,930	2,604	1,063,134	41	12,347	-	1,066	302	-	
25	2,427	1,096,357	2,427	1,065,561	39	12,386	-	1,003	297	-	
26	2,338	1,098,695	2,153	1,067,714	34	12,420	-	1,024	284	-	
27	2,001	-	-	-	10	12,430	-	842	281	-	
28	1,315	1,102,011	1,605	1,071,400	3	12,433	-	849	279	-	

The government announced that COVID-19 boosters would be available for youth 12 to 17 years old.

=== March ===
Date	Cases		Recoveries		Deaths		Active	Hospitalizations			Sources
Date	New	Total	New	Total	New	Total	Total	Total	ICU	Ventilators	Sources
1	1,176	1,103,187	2,427	1,073,281	18	12,451	-	914	278	-	
2	1,959	1,105,146	2,411	1,075,692	27	12,478	-	847	273	-	
3	2,262	1,107,408	2,293	1,077,985	19	12,497	-	834	267	-	
4	2,085	1,109,493	2,079	1,080,064	28	12,525	-	821	262	-	
5	1,930	1,111,423	-	-	18	12,549	-	795	253	-	
6	1,787	1,113,210	-	-	17	12,570	-	795	253	-	
7	1,074	1,114,284	1,365	1,085,011	4	12,574	-	693	249	-	
8	1,208	1,115,492	1,653	1,086,664	20	12,591	-	779	246	-	
9	1,947	1,117,439	1,951	1,088,615	27	12,618	-	751	241	-	
10	2,125	1,119,564	2,361	1,090,976	20	12,638	-	742	244	-	
11	2,130	1,121,694	2,523	1,093,499	-411	12,227	-	717	238	-	
12	2,015	1,123,709	1,722	1,095,221	20	12,247	-	722	232	-	
13	1,631	-	-	-	9	-	-	722	232	-	
14	1,116	1,126,456	1,333	1,098,189	0	12,256	-	722	228	-	
15	1,076	1,127,532	1,593	1,090,976	16	12,272	-	688	220	-	
16	2,011	1,129,543	2,060	1,101,842	16	12,288	-	649	209	-	
17	2,398	1,131,941	2,395	1,104,237	19	12,307	-	644	199	-	
18	2,502	1,134,443	1,899	1,106,136	6	12,313	-	615	193	-	
19	2,078	1,136,521	1,704	1,107,840	16	12,329	-	613	185	-	
20	1,680	1,138,201	1,520	1,109,360	3	12,332	-	551	182	-	
21	1,217	1,139,418	1,317	1,110,677	4	12,336	-	551	181	-	
22	1,447	1,140,865	1,317	1,112,239	7	12,343	-	639	179	-	
23	2,149	1,143,014	2,149	1,114,388	13	12,356	-	611	174	-	
24	2,561	1,145,575	1,990	1,116,378	10	12,366	-	661	165	-	
25	2,761	1,148,336	1,818	1,148,336	22	12,388	-	667	161	-	
26	2,754	1,151,090	1,921	1,120,117	9	12,397	-	707	157	-	
27	2,215	1,153,305	1,638	1,121,755	4	12,401	-	553	157	-	
28	1,741	1,155,046	1,450	1,123,205	4	12,405	-	655	158	-	
29	1,610	1,156,656	1,683	1,124,888	7	12,414	-	790	165	-	
30	2,814	1,159,470	2,419	1,127,307	13	12,427	-	778	165	-	
31	3,139	1,162,609	2,121	1,129,428	6	12,433	-	807	166		

On March 3, Dr. Kieran Moore, Ontario's Chief Medical Officer of Health, said the actual number of COVID-19 cases in the province is likely ten times the reported figure based on limited testing.

On March 21, Ontario dropped its mask mandate for schools, restaurants, bars, gyms, and several other public settings.

=== April ===
Date	Cases		Recoveries		Deaths		Active	Hospitalizations			Sources
Date	New	Total	New	Total	New	Total	Total	Total	ICU	Ventilators	Sources
1	3,519	1,166,128	2,173	1,131,601	18	12,451	-	804	167	-	
2	3,233	1,169,361	-	-	19	12,460	-	855	165	-	
3	3,077	1,172,438	-	-	10	12,470	-	855	165	-	
4	2,246	1,174,686	-	-	0	12,470	-	857	168	-	
5	1,991	1,176,677	2,117	1,139,179	9	12,479	-	1,091	173	-	
6	3,444	1,180,121	2,872	1,142,051	32	12,511	-	1,074	168	-	
7	4,224	1,184,345	2,838	1,144,889	16	12,527	-	1,126	159	-	
8	4,295	1,188,640	2,644	1,147,533	10	12,537	-	1,135	166	-	
9	3,397	1,192,437	-	1,149,833	11	12,548	-	1,188	168	-	
10	3,481	1,195,918	-	1,152,175	15	12,563	-	977	173	-	
11	2,401	1,198,319	1,875	1,154,050	3	12,566	-	1,090	184	-	
12	2,300	1,200,619	2,282	1,156,332	4	12,570	-	1,366	190	-	
13	3,833	1,204,452	3,339	1,159,671	13	12,583	-	1,332	182	-	
14	4,589	1,209,041	3,332	1,163,003	23	12,606	-	1,392	177	-	
15	4,332	-	-	-	-	-	-	1,427	-	-	
16	4,201	1,217,574	-	1,168,929	23	12,629	-	1,130	185	-	
17	2,450	-	2,800	-	-	-	-	1,290	-	-	
18	2,219	1,222,243	2,382	1,174,111	3	12,632	-	1,301	184	-	
19	1,218	1,223,461	2,764	1,176,875	1	12,633	-	1,486	206	-	
20	1,073	1,224,534	-	-	28	12,661	-	1,662	176	-	
21	5,038	1,229,572	4,019	1,184,812	17	12,678	-	1,626	207	-	
22	4,668	1,234,240	3,626	1,188,438	26	12,704	-	1,591	214	-	
23	3,820	1,238,060	-	1,191,712	23	12,728	-	1,684	212	81	
24	4,098	1,242,158	-	1,194,904	6	12,734	-	1,362	212	92	
25	2,088	1,244,186	2,641	1,197,545	2	12,736	-	1,455	219	97	
26	1,827	1,246,013	-	1,200,516	14	12,750	-	1,730	219	-	
27	3,005	1,249,018	4,055	1,204,571	22	12,772	-	1,734	211	-	
28	3,560	1,252,578	3,751	1,208,322	21	12,792	-	1,661	202	77	
29	2,760	1,255,338	3,462	1,211,784	20	12,812	-	1,679	209	94	
30	2,799	1,258,137	-	-	19	12,825	-	1,675	157	89	

On April 22, 2022, Ontario announced that the remaining mask mandate restrictions would be extended until June 11, 2022, due to a rising number of new cases.

=== May ===
Date	Cases		Recoveries		Deaths		Active	Hospitalizations			Sources
Date	New	Total	New	Total	New	Total	Total	Total	ICU	Ventilators	Sources
1	2,243	1,260,380	-	-	17	12,842	-	1,410	187	-	
2	1,275	1,261,655	2,292	1,219,640	-	12,842	-	1,423	211	-	
3	1,547	1,263,202	2,658	1,222,298	16	12,858	-	1,699	202	-	
4	2,488	1,265,690	3,457	1,225,755	31	12,889	-	1,698	199	-	
5	2,700	1,268,390	3,641	1,229,396	32	12,921	-	1,676	205	-	
6	2,418	1,270,808	3,086	1,232,482	17	12,938	-	1,662	210	-	
7	2,164	1,272,972	-	-	24	12,962	-	1,563	204	-	
8	1,938	1,274,910	2,503	1,237,805	10	12,972	-	1,167	207	-	
9	1,206	1,276,116	1,976	1,239,781	0	12,972	-	1,213	201	-	
10	1,089	1,277,205	2,148	1,241,929	19	12,991	-	1,555	188	-	
11	1,995	1,279,200	3,040	1,244,969	29	13,020	-	1,528	176	-	
12	2,160	1,281,360	2,602	1,281,360	14	13,034	-	1,451	175	-	
13	1,969	1,283,329	-	-	18	13,052	-	1,453	168	-	
14	1,575	1,284,904	-	-	11	13,063	-	1,392	156	-	
15	1,564	1,286,468	-	-	7	13,070	-	1,024	151	70	
16	1,601	1,276,116	1,394	1,255,239	2	13,072	-	1,122	159	-	
17	1,028	1,288,557	1,965	1,257,204	11	13,083	-	1,345	165	-	
18	1,692	1,290,249	2,374	1,290,249	16	13,099	-	1,248	163	-	
19	1,565	1,291,814	2,204	1,261,782	23	13,122	-	1,207	168	-	
20	1,412	1,293,226	1,887	1,263,669	24	13,146	-	1,165	163	-	
21	1,221	-	-	-	13	13,159	-	1,116	160	-	
22	1,054	1,295,499	-	-	2	13,161	-	809	152	-	
23	668	-	1,138	-	2	-	-	879	152	-	
24	619	1,296,786	1,238	1,269,275	1	13,164	-	890	157	-	
25	775	1,297,561	2,062	1,271,337	11	13,175	-	1,082	160	-	
26	1,217	1,298,778	1,748	1,273,085	20	13,195	-	1,005	154	-	
27	1,096	1,299,874	1,576	1,274,661	15	13,210	-	948	154	-	
28	1,144	1,301,018	-	-	13	-	-	865	144	-	
29	878	-	-	-	2	13,225	-	643	145	67	
30	547	1,302,443	930	1,278,464	1	13,226	-	611	147	-	
31	590	1,303,033	1,124	1,279,588	15	13,241	-	808	140	-	

On May 11, Ontario reported a total of 13,000 deaths.

On May 22, Ontario reported under 1,000 hospitalizations for the first time ever since January with the province reporting 809 hospitalizations.

On May 23, Ontario reported under 1,000 cases for the first time in months with the province reporting 668 new cases.

=== June ===
Date	Cases		Recoveries		Deaths		Active	Hospitalizations			Sources
Date	New	Total	New	Total	New	Total	Total	Total	ICU	Ventilators	Sources
1	1,030	1,304,063	1,478	1,281,066	24	13,265	-	722	127	-	
2	1,038	1,305,101	-	-	2	13,267	-	670	119	-	
3	888	1,283,417	1,230	1,283,417	8	13,275	-	669	117	-	
4	901	-	-	-	10	13,285	-	671	107	53	
5	710	-	-	-	3	13,288	-	419	111	-	
6	486	1,308,068	669	1,285,895	1	13,289	-	430	116	-	
7	537	1,308,605	769	1,286,664	4	13,293	-	526	114	-	
8	1,013	-	-	-	11	13,304	-	522	114	-	
9	907	1,310,525	983	1,288,515	10	13,314	-	549	118	-	
10	835	1,311,360	999	1,289,514	10	13,324	-	536	110	-	
11	825	-	-	-	12	-	-	528	110	-	
12	659	-	-	-	2	-	-	370	112	-	
13	-	-	-	-	0	13,338	-	370	112	-	
14	460	-	-	-	5	-	-	512	116	-	
15	506	-	-	-	8	13,351	-	506	115	49	
16	777	-	-	-	6	13,357	-	491	105	45	
23	-	1,319,977	-	-	21	13,378	-	486	96	-	

On June 11, Ontario's mask requirements were lifted on public transit and hospitals.

On June 17, Ontario's Chief Medical Officer of Health Dr. Kieran Moore announced that the province would switch to weekly reporting of COVID-19 data on Thursdays, ending the practice of publishing daily reports.
