= Immunization of School Pupils Act =

Ontario, Canada statute

Legislative Assembly of Ontario
- Enacted: 1990

The Immunization of School Pupils Act (French: Loi sur l'immunisation des élèves, ISPA) is a law in Ontario, Canada, that requires children and adolescents under the age of 18 to receive certain vaccinations to attend primary and secondary school unless a valid exemption is provided, which includes medical, religious, and conscience exemptions. The law applies to both private and public schools. ISPA was adopted in 1990 and was last amended in 2017.

The law requires vaccinations against the following diseases:

- Diphtheria
- Tetanus
- Polio
- Measles
- Mumps
- Rubella
- Meningococcal disease
- Whooping cough
- Chickenpox (children born in 2010 or later)

On October 28, 2021, Chief Medical Officer of Health of Ontario Kieran Moore said that Ontario will not integrate a COVID-19 vaccine requirement into ISPA "at present".

== Legal challenge ==
In October 2019, Vaccine Choice Canada, an anti-vaccination group, held a rally in Toronto in support of a court case the group launched jointly with five parents against ISPA. While legal experts believe the court challenge is unlikely to be successful, President of the Ontario Medical Association Sohail Gandhi is concerned the increased visibility gained by the group may result in more disinformation about vaccines being disseminated to the public.
