= Anti-vaccine activism in Canada =

History of the anti-vaccination movement in Canada

From its origins in the 19th century to the 2022 convoy protests, the Canadian anti-vaccination movement has been resisting public health efforts to promote vaccinations through mass demonstrations, political advocacy and judicial activism. It has been led by a succession of groups, with Vaccine Choice Canada being the most prominent as of 2025.

== Context ==
The Canadian anti-vaccination movement developed in parallel to its British and American equivalents in the late 19th and early 20th century, in response to legislation by provincial governments, municipalities and school boards attempting to check the spread of infectious diseases. The British anti-vaccination movement developed rapidly in the mid-19th century, with the Anti-vaccination League founded in response to the Vaccination Act of 1853. Anti-vaccination organizations founded in the United States between 1879 and 1885 were directly influenced by British activists such as William Tebb. By the end of the 19th century, the British anti-vaccination movement had developed from a loose community of interest that included homeopaths, hydrotherapists and faith healers to an international network of associations.

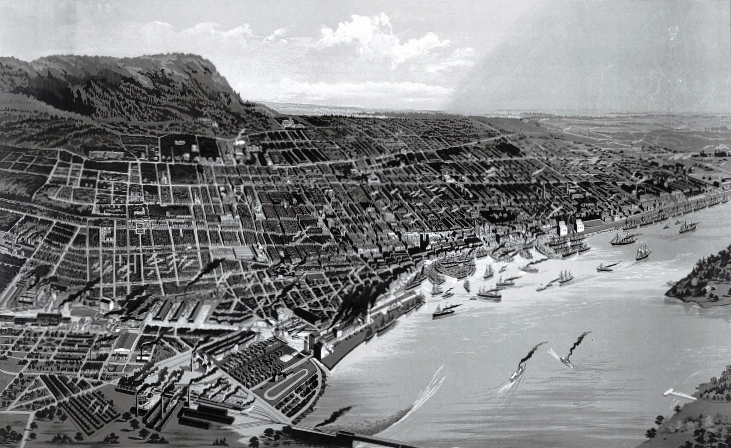
Montreal in 1888, nestled between the southern slope of the Mont Royal and the St. Lawrence River.

Along with the development of inoculation, public health structures were starting to take shape in Canadian cities. Legislation allowing for the formation of temporary local public health boards to respond to epidemics was passed in Upper Canada in 1833; these boards were to operate continuously by 1849 and by 1886, some 400 health boards would be in operation in what is now Ontario. A provincial board of health created in 1882 normally played only an advisory role, but ordered school closures and suspended stagecoaches when called upon to manage a smallpox epidemic in Eastern Ontario in 1884. Toronto appointed William Canniff as its first Medical Officer of Health in 1883.

== First Anti-vaccination League and the 1875 riot ==
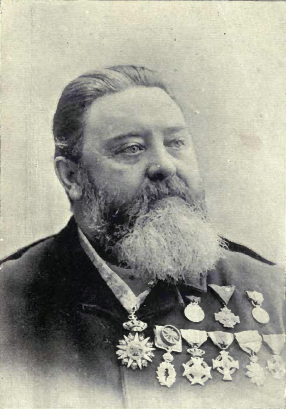
Alexander Milton Ross, early Canadian anti-vaccine activist.

Montreal started appointing medical officers of health in 1870. The population of what was then Canada's largest city was demanding better sanitation in the rapidly-expanding industrial centre. There was, however, significant unease with vaccination, especially in the francophone neighborhoods and the surrounding villages. Doctors who opposed vaccination had exerted a significant influence, contributing to low rates of inoculation. Those included Alexander Milton Ross, who maintained correspondence with British anti-vaccination activists. His French Canadian counterpart was Joseph Emery Coderre, a co-founder of the Montreal Medical Society. Coderre organized debates between the city's medical doctors, presenting evidence that, to his mind, showed smallpox vaccination was both ineffective and harmful.

Coderre established Canada's first Anti-vaccination league in 1872, recruiting primarily among physicians, but also aldermen and lawyers. He argued some 2,000 physicians were anti-vaccinationists, but was unable to make his point of view prevail among his colleagues of the Society, which continued to support a free and voluntary vaccinations program managed by Medical Health Officer Alphonse Barnabé LaRocque. Montreal's mayor, William Hingston, strongly supported vaccination and chaired the city's Health Committee. When the municipal council debated a by-law permitting compulsory vaccination on August 9, 1875, a crowd led by lawyer Henri St. Pierre and other leaders of the league threw stones and injured two council members, then damaged LaRocque's home. The proposed by-law was dropped.

In 1876, LaRocque attributed reluctance encountered among the city's French-speaking working-class to the League's influence, despite being the very population that was more vulnerable to infectious diseases, living in close quarters among the factories and slaughterhouses of the lower town. In addition to exaggerating the incidence and severity of adverse reaction to the vaccine, Coderre's League equated vaccination with British imperialism, thus tapping into existing linguistic tensions.

== 1885 Montreal smallpox epidemic ==
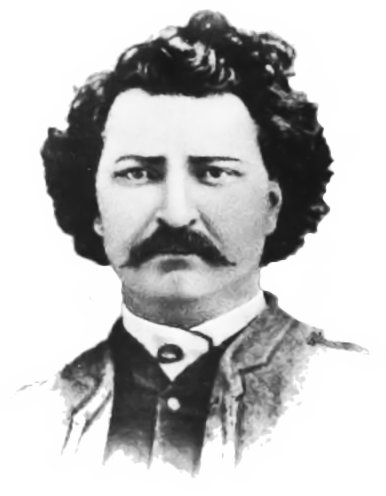
The execution of Métis leader Louis Riel exacerbated tensions between francophones and anglophones, impeding public health efforts.

Historian Michael Bliss argues the anti-vaccination movement found favourable conditions in Montreal in 1885: impressive side effects to the vaccine from faulty vaccination procedures early in the epidemic, language tensions exacerbated by the trial and execution of Louis Riel, economic disparities between anglophone and francophone neighbourhoods, and a timid early response from civil authorities.

Smallpox probably arrived in Montreal in January 1885 with one or several train conductors and was allowed to spread through the urban population through poor containment and a disorganized public health response. In addition to normal side effects, an initial batch of vaccines was contaminated during manufacture and caused cases of skin infections; this provoked a three-months cessation of the campaign at a critical stage and a hardening of public opinion. By the end of the Summer, there might have been as many as 4,000 cases in Montreal, with the epidemic spreading to other population centers. The Catholic clergy, already singing the praises of vaccination from the pulpit, agreed to visit people identified by the Health Board as having refused vaccination to enlist their cooperation.

The Canadian Anti-Compulsory Vaccination League was founded at that time by Ross, Coderre and several physicians involved in his first League, as well as businessman W.T. Costigan and Dean of McGill Law School William Kerr. The new league also counted several high-profile anti-vaccinators from abroad, most notably William Tebb and the American Robert Gunn. That second league's objections to smallpox vaccination centred on three claims: that the vaccines were ineffective, arguing it failed to prevent smallpox; that they caused other diseases such as tuberculosis; and that they infringed upon the rights of citizens.

Drawing depicting the reaction to mandatory vaccination in 1885 by Robert Harris, who was then teaching in Montreal.

On September 28, 1885, tensions between health authorities trying to impose vaccination and a hardening opposition reached new heights. About one thousand French Canadians gathered in a mass protest that became a riot. Kept on the move by successive police interventions, they shattered the windows of the Health Board on Sainte Catherine Street before turning on several drugstores selling vaccines. They then attacked what they believed to be the houses of two members of the health board (damaging one belonging to someone with the same name). Later that night, the crowd stormed the section of City Hall that housed the Health Board office; when they had to retreat before a police charge, they made their way to the Montreal Herald, where the printers continued to prepare the morning edition as the windows were shattered by stones. The Chief of Police Hercule Paradis was stabbed during an attack on the central police station. In the aftermath, Mayor Honoré Beaugrand armed the health inspectors and asked the militia to support civil authorities.

Montreal wasn't the only city to experience anti-vaccination riots in 1885: in the United Kingdom, civil disturbances of a much greater scale were taking place in Leicester. Canadian anti-vaccination activists were exchanging correspondence with their British and American counterparts, with articles from London reprinted in newsletters in Montreal. Coderre was a member of the Ligue internationale des anti-vaccinateurs, giving him access to a pan-European network of influencers.

Anti-vaccination pamphlet produced by Alexander Ross in 1885. "You are contaminating the bodies of your children with disease and impurity."

While violence didn't occur again in 1885, the public opinion battles continued. With newspapers refusing to print his advertisements or to cover his speeches, Ross published on September 30 the first of a series of four-page pamphlet called The Anti-Vaccinator and Advocate of Cleanliness, the Canadian scion of a long-running British anti-vaccination journal. Coderre published his own Anti-Vaccinateur. The League also provided legal assistance to some of the 200 citizens charged with violating the health by-laws. McGill's Dean of Law William Hastings Kerr provided legal advice to the League.

The epidemic continued to rage through the rest of 1885, claiming some 50 dead per day, before being defeated by the now compulsory vaccination campaign. Montreal lost 3,164 people to smallpox in 1885, amounting to 1.89% of its population. Some 91% of the dead were francophones, and 66% were younger than five years old. In the whole province of Quebec, the epidemic killed 5,864 people in 1885 and the first months of 1886. The adjacent province of Ontario was largely spared, with only 30 deaths from the disease: its provincial board of health (an organization that had no equivalent in Quebec) acted early to inspect train passengers coming from Montreal, who had to show either documentation proving vaccination or a recent vaccination scar.

=== Aftermath ===
Despite the high death toll due to vaccine hesitancy and initial disorganization, the 1885 Montreal smallpox epidemic provided a proof of concept for the effectiveness of vaccination in conjunction with public health measures (such as monitoring and isolation of cases). The first permanent Quebec health board was created in 1886 on the heels of the epidemic. However, vaccination rates remained low in the province, leaving the population vulnerable to more fatal outbreaks in 1891 and in 1897-1898. The anti-vaccination movement remained a contributing factor in what is today called vaccine hesitancy for the next 30 years, especially in Quebec where it could use rhetoric that drew upon inequalities inflicted upon French Canadians.

The League remained active into 1886, unsuccessfully attempting to defeat pro-vaccination candidates in the 1886 municipal election and opposing the adoption of a provincial vaccination bill. Ross would leave Montreal and form the Toronto Anti-compulsory vaccination League in 1888, as the city's medical health officer imposed school vaccination for schoolchildren. With Ross' departure and Coderre's death in 1888, the Montreal league faded away.

In response to the epidemic, the adjacent province of Ontario passed the 1887 Vaccination Act (An Act respecting Vaccination and Inoculation), mandating smallpox vaccination for infants. The legislation also allowed municipalities and school boards to adopt their own mandates. The Toronto Board of Education used this new public health power to mandate smallpox vaccination for attendance to its schools in 1894. The new measures were the object of lasting public debate and garnered considerable news coverage. Legislation from this period was weak compared to the vaccination acts protecting the British public and enforcement in the face of organized opposition remained a constant problem. As a result, childhood vaccination rates remained low through to the end of the century.

== 20th century ==
It appears Ross' organization might not have survived his death in 1897, for another Canadian Anti-Vaccination League was founded in 1900, as provincial and school authorities were putting in place the legislative and regulatory instruments allowing mandatory vaccination. In 1906, the League presented a petition signed by 5,000 people and convinced the Toronto Board of Education to rescind its 1894 by-law. Despite significant support from the press, the League was unable to get the provincial legislation off the books. The Ontario Board of health launched an information campaign on vaccination, hoping to take some of the wind out of the anti-vaccination's sails.

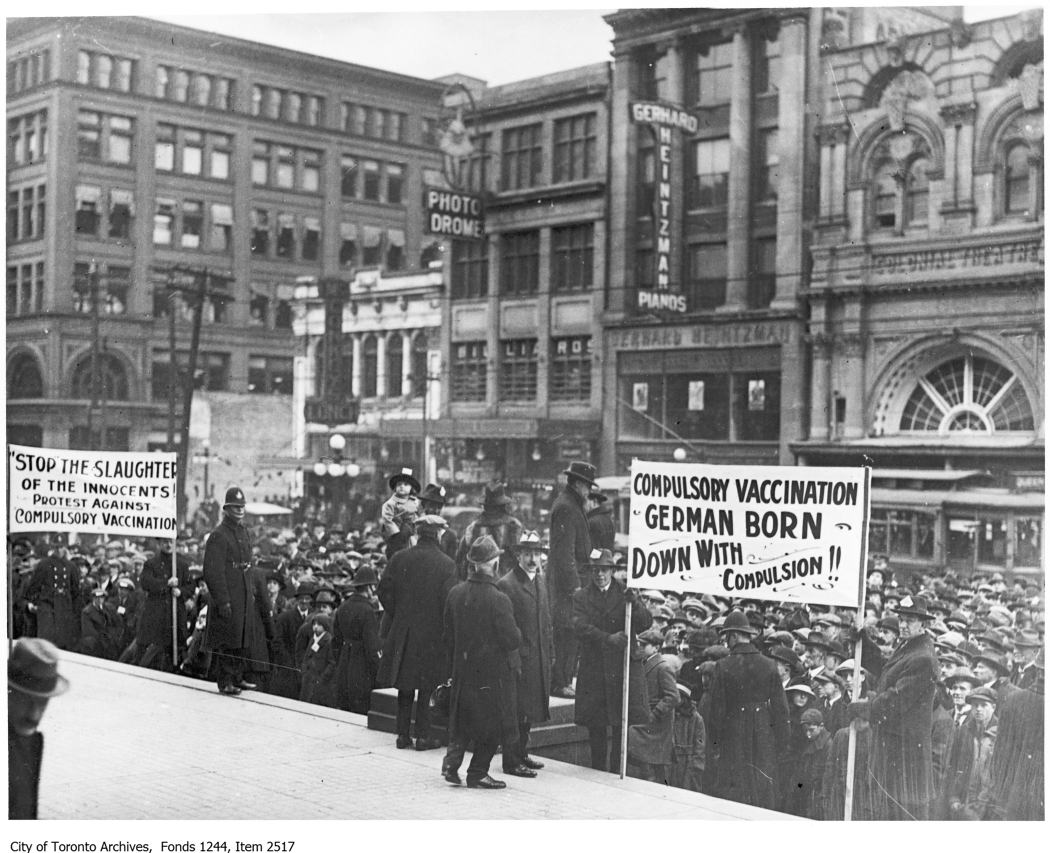
A 1919 rally organized by the Anti-Vaccination League in Toronto.

The movement emphasized the sometimes spectacular side effects and infections provoked by vaccination, but the improving quality of products and procedures in the 20th century blunted that argument. In Canada as elsewhere, governments were investing more heavily in public health measures, with visible results. Ontario was able to adopt its Public Health Act in 1912 and a new Vaccination Act in 1914, the latter making vaccination mandatory in the event of a smallpox outbreak. The First World War funneled more resources to public health agencies and gave a patriotic sheen to vaccination, yet anti-vaccinators were still a force to be reckoned with when Toronto was hit by a smallpox outbreak in 1919. In contrast to Coderre's 19th-century group of doctors having science-based debates on the merits of vaccination, the new leadership was composed of homeopaths, labour leaders and parents resentful of what they perceived as bureaucratic overreach. A divided city council rejected the province's call for general mandatory vaccination. However, the voluntary campaign was successful enough - with 200,000 inoculations - to limit the extent of the epidemic to 2,864 cases and 11 deaths.

With a medical community firmly convinced of the benefits of vaccination and waning popular support, the anti-vaccination movement faded into the background. The League was replaced in 1921 by the Anti-vaccination and Medical Liberty League of Canada, which operated under that name until 1964 before truncating it to Medical Liberty League of Canada in 1964. The League was officially dissolved as a corporation in 2016, having failed to make its annual filings. The newly-founded Canadian Anti-Vivisection Society also promoted anti-vaccination views in this decade. They were not able to mount large public campaigns or act effectively on the legislative front.

=== 1980s resurgence ===
Canadian anti-vaccination groups remained absent or dormant for five decades until the 1980s, but individuals still recycled the arguments used by the anti-vaccination leagues. Paul-Émile Chèvrefils, a medical doctor who lost his license in the 1960s, enjoyed significant media attention in Quebec, writing the anti-vaccination book "Les vaccins, racket et poisons?" Chèvrefils, having converted to chiropractic and naturopathy, would continue to advocate against vaccination well into the 1980s.

Canada experienced several measles outbreaks in the 1970s. These were not so much the product of vaccine hesitancy, but of hesitant vaccination policy, the single dose recommended by Canadian authorities proving insufficient. In 1979, a major outbreak with 20,000 reported infections, mostly in Alberta and Ontario, brought the number of deaths for the decade to 129.

Canadian public health authorities that were attempting to imitate successful efforts in the United States to control measles by imposing mandatory vaccination for schoolchildren in Ontario, Manitoba and New Brunswick were confronted by a new brand of activists. Parenting styles such as intensive mothering, increased distrust about the profit motives of the pharmaceutical industry and the popularity of other approaches to health during the 1970s and 1980s allowed anti-vaccination groups to make inroads with educated, individualistic women. Wellness magazines, such as Alive and Vitality, provided ready access to that audience. Writers such as Rhody Lake, Edda West, Helke Ferrie, Guylaine Lanctôt and Zoltan Rona used the medical establishment’s perceived arrogance to position anti-vaccination arguments within a feminist perspective.

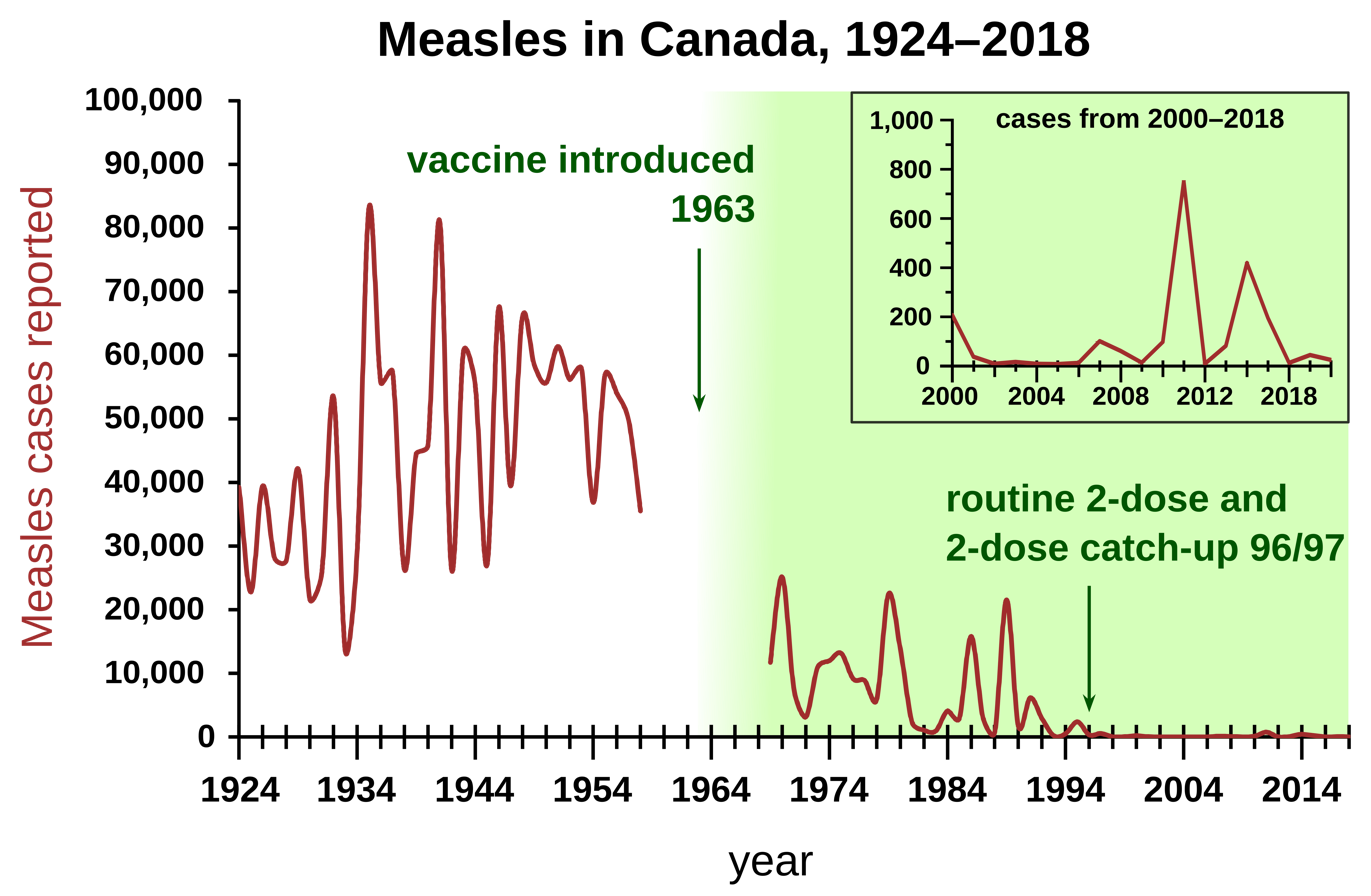
Number of measles cases in Canada, showing the effect of the vaccine in the 1960s and the switch to a 2-dose policy in the late 1990s.

The Ontario Compulsory Immunization of School Pupils Act of 1982 implemented recommendations from officials at Health Canada, the Society of Medical Officers of Health of Ontario, as well as requests from Toronto area school boards. The bill, which included medical and religious exemptions, was adopted with the support of all parties in the Ontario legislature. The Committee Against Compulsory Vaccination was established to help parents lobby for exemptions for their children. Leader Edda Goldman (later called Edda West) was a proponent of intensive parenting and believed the MMR vaccine gave her youngest child allergies. Coached by the group, children of parents who challenged the Act were allowed to send their unvaccinated children to school, authorities fearing the law might be found to run afoul of the Canadian Charter of Rights and Freedoms, or that many parents would choose to homeschool instead. The Act was amended in 1984 to expand exemptions.

The Committee Against Compulsory Vaccination supported a court case filed by Colin and Donna Rothwell against Connaught Laboratories, alleging their son went blind was as a consequence of a pertussis vaccine injection. The case failed but Donna Rothwell founded the Association of Vaccine-Damaged Children in 1985, with chapters in British Columbia and Manitoba in addition to Ontario. Despite recommendations from the Canadian Paediatric Society and the Ontario Medical Association, the federal government decided not to introduce a vaccine injury compensation program to mitigate the potential impact of further lawsuits at the time (it would do so in 2021). Quebec did put together such a program in 1987.

In 1992, West formed the Vaccination Risk Information and Alternatives Resource Group, which changed its name to the Vaccine Risk Awareness Network in 1995 and again in 2014 to Vaccine Choice Canada. As of 2025, VCC is still the leading anti-vaccination group in Canada.

=== Indigenous Peoples ===
Violent treatment by colonial authorities, which included medical experimentation and coerced sterilization, have left Canada's First Nations, Métis and Inuit peoples with a troubled relationship with public health authorities. Rather than contact with anti-vaccination disinformation, long-term consequences of abuse is a likely explanation for the greater measure of vaccine hesitancy observed among Indigenous Peoples. Along with living conditions that are often much poorer than the average Canadian, this leaves Indigenous peoples in an especially vulnerable position, notably during the COVID-19 pandemic.

== 21st century and the COVID-19 pandemic ==
On February 5, 2015, the Toronto Star published a sensational investigation into the Gardasil (HPV) vaccine that was later removed. The report from a newspaper with an otherwise strong reputation for accuracy received considerable attention in Canada and the United States, as well as criticism by investigative journalists for its use of anecdotes and imprudent use of data from public access databases. The coverage stated that more than 60 girls had been seriously harmed by the vaccine since 2008. The newspaper alleged medical authorities downplayed the risks associated with the vaccine to the point that parents could not provide informed consent. A supporting editorial was published the next day in the paper edition.

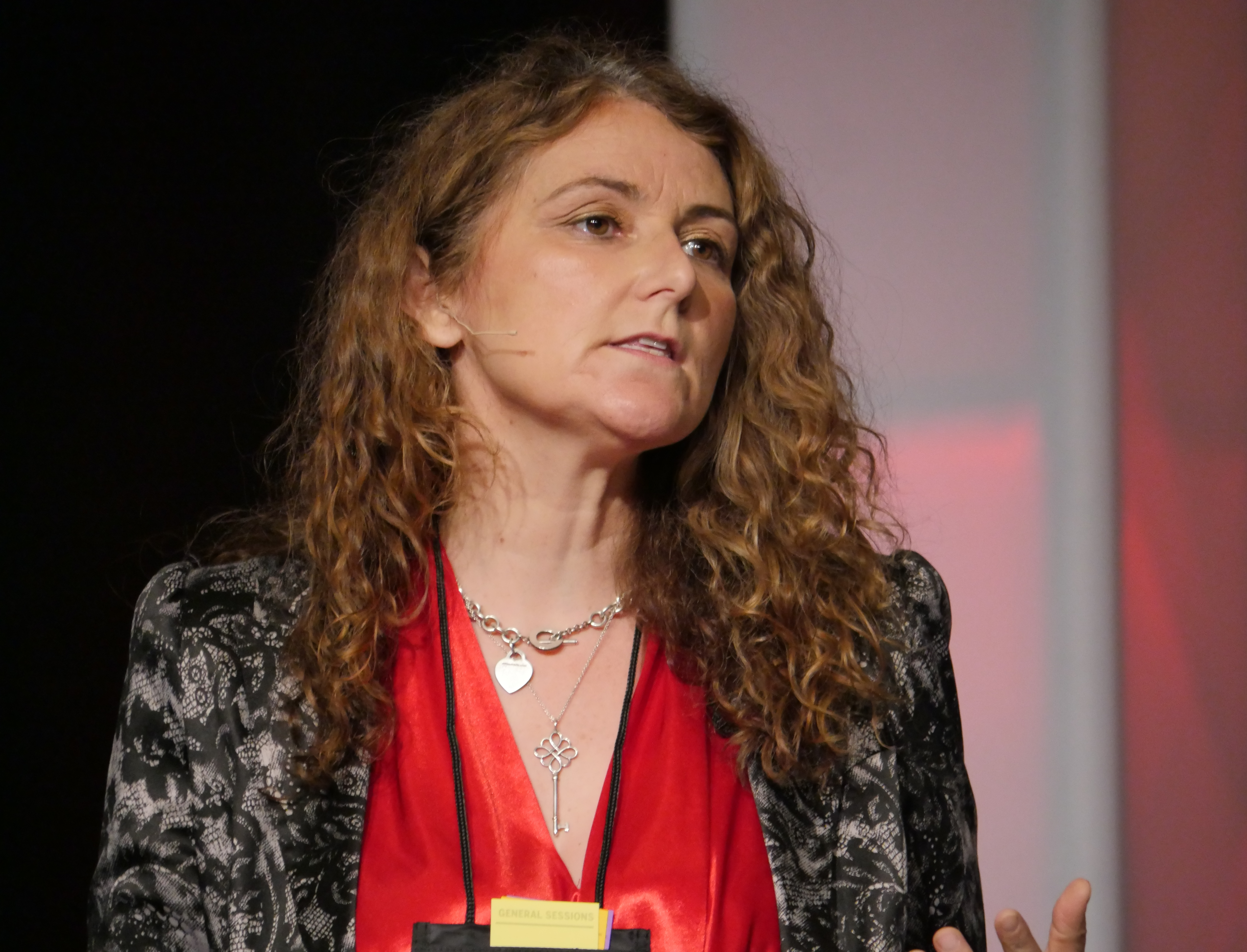
Jen Gunter was among the experts criticizing the Toronto Star's Gardasil news coverage.

The Star initially defended its coverage, with editor-in-chief Michael Cooke and columnist Heather Mallick attacking gynecologist Jen Gunter and other specialists criticizing the sensationalist nature of the reporting. After two weeks, Toronto Star publisher John Cruickshank recognized the newspaper failed in its responsibilities to the public by running the piece and it was removed from the newspaper's website, although the editorial remained.

An academic study on media portrayal of the HPV vaccine in Canadian media concludes that the Toronto Star piece "may have fostered continued misconceptions about the HPV vaccine. It is both ethically and journalistically problematic to suggest a causal relation to the HPV vaccine without empirical evidence, as negative media attention ultimately impacts vaccination programs and policy decisions."

The movement continued to oppose attempts by Canadian jurisdictions to tighten vaccination rules. In 2019, Vaccine Choice Canada flew in their President Ted Kuntz and American anti-vaccination activist Robert Sears to participate in parliamentary hearings on vaccine exemptions in New Brunswick. Earlier that year, the group had been running billboard advertising in Toronto inviting parents to claim vaccination exemptions and supported a lawsuit seeking to bring down Ontario's Immunization of School Pupils Act.

=== COVID-19 pandemic ===
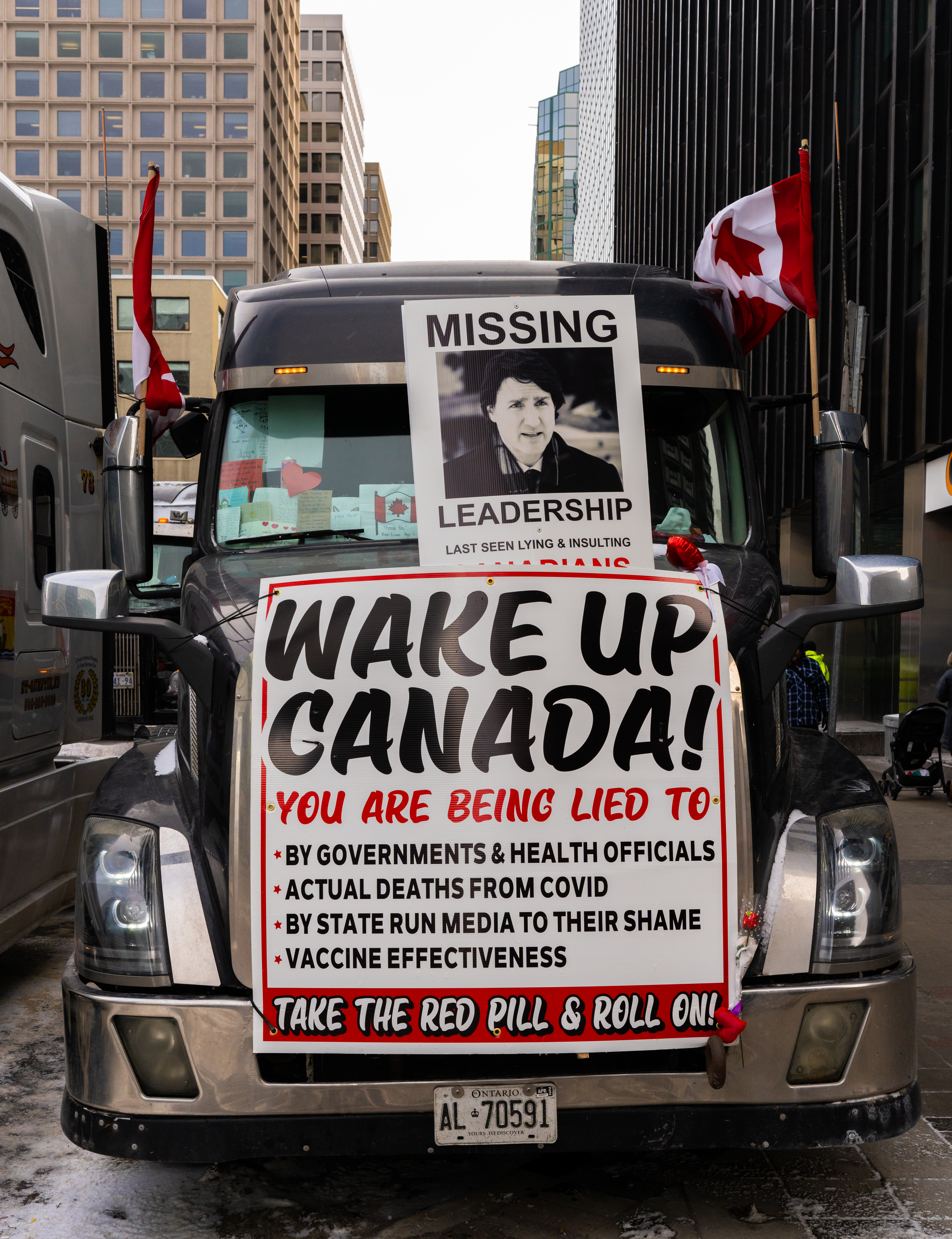
Anti-vaccine messaging in Ottawa during the 2022 convoy occupation.

The established anti-vaccination organizations such as Vaccine Choice Canada were joined by groups founded during the first year of the pandemic, such as Hugs over Masks, Families for Choice, No More Lockdowns and Canadian Frontline Nurses. Simultaneously, Canadian far-right groups such as Diagolon and Canada First integrated anti-vaccination to their rhetoric. This larger "anti-lockdown movement", which included not only groups but charismatic personalities such as Chris Saccoccia, lacked cohesion. In the chaotic information environment of the early pandemic, conspiracy theories found fertile ground in a rapidly-developing alternative media infrastructure that included Rebel News, the Western Standard and True North. Armed Conflict Location and Event Data reported more than 370 anti-vaccination protests during the convoy's duration (January 15, 2021 to February 18, 2022) as the leaders called their supporters into the streets.

The anti-vaccination movement was an integral part of the 2022 convoy protests and part of its leadership. Pat King, one of the most visible convoy leaders, promoted anti-vaccination conspiracy theories and encouraged people to flout public health directives. Pastor Henry Hildebrandt, who led convoy protestors in religious services in Ottawa, defied COVID-19 gathering restrictions. Jason LaFace was both a central figure of No More Lockdowns and a spokesperson for the convoy.
