= Timeline of the COVID-19 pandemic in Ontario =

Timeline of the COVID-19 pandemic in Ontario may refer to:

- Timeline of the COVID-19 pandemic in Ontario (2020)
- Timeline of the COVID-19 pandemic in Ontario (2021)
- Timeline of the COVID-19 pandemic in Ontario (2022)
