= David Williams (Canadian physician) =

Canadian physician

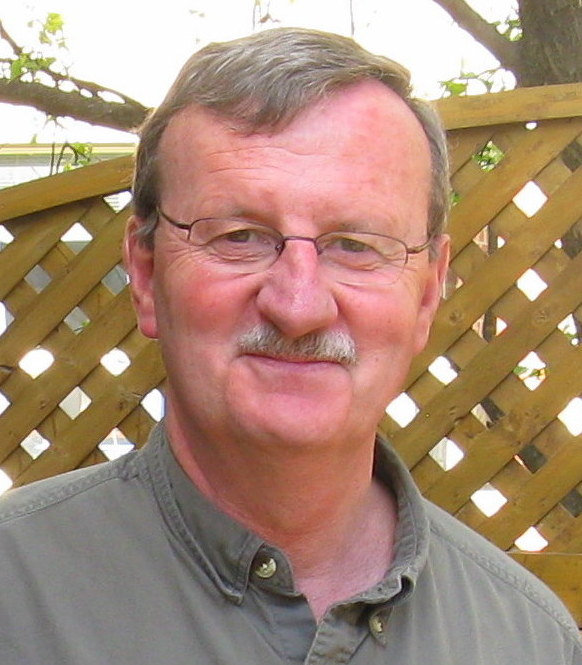
- Williams in 2009

Chief Medical Officer of Health
- In office February 16, 2016 – June 26, 2021
- Succeeded by: Kieran Moore
- Acting
- In office July 1, 2015 – February 16, 2016
- Acting
- In office November 2007 – June 2009

Medical Officer of Health for Thunder Bay
- In office October 2011 – June 30, 2015
- In office 1991–2005

Associate Chief Medical Officer of Health
- In office 2005–2011

Personal details
- Born: David Cecil Williams Ontario, Canada
- Education: University of Toronto (BSc, MD, MHSc)

David Cecil Williams is a Canadian physician and public servant who served as Chief Medical Officer of Health for the province of Ontario from 2015 to 2021. He served as acting Chief Medical Officer of Health for the province from 2007 to 2009 and again from 2015 to 2016 until taking the position permanently. He previously held the role of Medical Officer of Health for the Thunder Bay District health unit.

His tenure for the Province of Ontario was most notable during the COVID-19 pandemic in Ontario.

== Education and early career ==
Williams holds three degrees from University of Toronto, a Bachelor of Science (BSc), Doctor of Medicine (MD) and Master of Health Science (MHSc). He is a fellow of Royal College of Physicians of Canada in community medicine/public health and preventive medicine.

Williams initially worked as a general practitioner and anesthetist in Sioux Lookout, Ontario and served on an international mission in a hospital setting to Tansen, Nepal.

== Public health career ==
Williams served as the medical officer of health for Thunder Bay, Ontario from 1991 until 2005, and again in 2011 until 2015.

He served as associate chief medical officer of health for the province of Ontario from 2005 until 2011, and served as acting chief medical officer of health from 2007 to 2009 and again in 2015 until he took the job permanently.

=== Opioid epidemic ===
Williams has been involved in the ongoing opioid epidemic, which affects Canada and the province of Ontario. His promoted and suggested methods to health care providers in the province involve harm reduction and the extended use of opioid replacement therapy with drugs such as suboxone. Williams expressed concerns over an increase in carfentanil presence in street drugs.

=== COVID-19 ===
As Ontario's chief medical officer of health during the COVID-19 pandemic, Williams led the province's response to the COVID-19 pandemic since the first case in the COVID-19 pandemic in Canada was identified in Toronto. Williams faced harsh criticism during the pandemic. In November 2020, Williams was scheduled to retire from his position, but was convinced to stay on by Premier Doug Ford until June 25, 2021 when he was succeeded by Kieran Moore.
