= Vaccine Choice Canada =

Canadian anti-vaccination group

- Abbreviation: VCC
- Founder: Edda West
- Type: Non-profit advocacy organization
- Location: Winlaw, British Columbia
- President: Ted Kuntz
- Board of directors: G Baribeau D Anderson T Kuntz
- Website: vaccinechoicecanada.com
- Formerly called: Vaccination Risk Awareness Network (VRAN)

Vaccine Choice Canada (VCC) is Canada's main anti-vaccination group. It was founded in 1986 under the name Association for Vaccine Damaged Children, became the Vaccination Risk Awareness Network in 1994 and adopted its current name in 2014. The group has been contributing to vaccine hesitancy in Canada, encouraging citizens to forgo immunization and legislators to support anti-vaccine regulations and legislation.

== Vaccine hesitancy ==
VCC spreads the discredited hypothesis that vaccination causes autism and denies that the introduction of vaccines led to a decline of the targeted diseases. They blame vaccination for a variety of ailments, including autism spectrum disorders, learning disabilities, ADHD, allergies, and asthma.

The group argues incorrectly that a vaccine against COVID-19 is unnecessary. Late in the pandemic, it still repeated the discredited myth that the pandemic is no more severe than the flu.

Although a small fraction of vaccine doses provoke serious adverse reactions, health professionals agree the benefits of being protected against a wide range of infectious diseases far outweigh the risks. Responding directly to communications from Vaccine Choice Canada, the Public Health Agency of Canada stated that the science on vaccines is unequivocal, but laments the actions of "a small but vocal anti-vaccination community that spreads false information. They use powerful emotional images and misinformation with their message. This creates confusion and fear for parents who are trying to make the best decisions for the health and wellbeing of their children." Timothy Caulfield estimates the proportion of Canadians who exhibit vaccine hesitancy between 20 and 30 percent, connecting the anti-vaccination movement to a rise in populism and a mistrust in expertise.

The World Health Organization has identified vaccine hesitancy as one of 2019's ten global health threats to watch.

== Role in COVID-19 pandemic ==
Similarly to many anti-vaccination groups, Vaccine Choice Canada is opposing several measures instituted by public health authorities to limit the spread of the COVID-19 pandemic. Its President repeated some of the most widespread myths about the virus, including that it is no more dangerous than influenza and that developing a vaccine is therefore unnecessary. Influenza is actually responsible for 3,500 deaths in a typical year, while the death toll of four months of COVID-19 already exceeded 8,000 at that point. Jonathan Jarry from the Office for Science and Society warned that with anti-vaccination groups misrepresenting legitimate concerns about rushing vaccines into production as anti-vaccine arguments, "we have the beginnings of a perfect storm on our hands to fuel vaccine misinformation". Vaccine Choice Canada partnered with Hugs Over Masks, a newly created group protesting against mandatory mask-wearing.

With Denis Rancourt and others, Vaccine Choice Canada tabled a lawsuit against most Canadian governments, seeking to have the courts strike down measures mandated by public health authorities, including regulations introducing the obligation to wear masks in interior public spaces that several provinces adopted. The lawsuit, filed in July 2020 by lawyer Rocco Galati with the Ontario Superior Court of Justice, alleges lockdowns, physical distancing and mandatory masking violate the constitutional rights of Canadians. It also makes wider claims about a "New (Economic) World Order" and a "massive and concentrated push for mandatory vaccines of every human on the planet earth with concurrent electronic surveillance" at the behest of "global Billionaire, Corporate and Organizational Oligarchs", which refer to conspiracy theories widely shared on social media by a variety of fringe groups. The lawsuit also names the Canadian Broadcasting Corporation, accusing the information network of a "stalinist" campaign to hide the truth about public health measures.

== Public communications ==
In February 2019, Vaccine Choice bought space on 50 billboards in the Toronto area to broadcast anti-vaccine messages, such as one inviting parents to learn how to get around the obligation to vaccinate children in order to have them attend public schools. The messages displayed on the billboards were characterized as "half-truths" by Toronto's Associate Medical Officer of Health. The campaign was discontinued by Outfront Media after a request from Toronto City Council. The campaign was denounced by Ontario's Minister of Health Christine Elliott, who encouraged Ontarians to get inoculated.

In August 2019, Vaccine Choice Canada admitted it had paid the expenses of American anti-vaccination activists coming to participate in parliamentary committee hearings on vaccine exemptions for school children in New Brunswick, including Bob Sears. During the hearings, VCC spokesperson Ted Kuntz indicated the group intended to take the province's government to court if it decided to eliminate non-medical exemptions. New Brunswick's Education Minister Dominic Cardy denounced the conspiracy theories presented by the witnesses: "If you believe in evidence-based decision-making, you have to look at the evidence, and the evidence is incontrovertible."

Also in early 2019, Vaccine Choice wrote to Facebook CEO Mark Zuckerberg to oppose upcoming changes that would make anti-vaccine messages less likely to be propagated by the social media platform, such as not sharing them as automatic recommendations. Speaking for VCC, Ted Kuntz equated these proposed changes in programming with censorship. A representative of the group also participated to a panel of anti-vaccination activists in Toronto, in April 2019.

In October 2019, Vaccine Choice Canada held a rally in Toronto in support of a court case the group launched jointly with five parents against Ontario's Immunization of School Pupils Act, which requires that pupils must have received certain vaccines to attend the public school system. While legal experts believe the court challenge is unlikely to be successful, President of the Ontario Medical Association Sohail Gandhi is concerned the increased visibility gained by the group may result in more disinformation about vaccines being disseminated to the public.

Vaccine Choice issued "Adding Insult To Injury Awards" in 2016 and 2017 to media outlets that produced news reports it disliked. The host of one program was thus targeted, The Sunday Edition's Michael Enright, sarcastically accepted the award with pride, on behalf of the Canadian Broadcasting Corporation. He took the opportunity to talk about pediatrician Peter Hotez's warning that anti-vaccine campaigns will lead to serious outbreaks of measles. The segment of the program VCC was reacting to was an interview with Brendan Nyhan about the "backfire effect".

With Rebel News, Vaccine Choice Canada sponsored a June 2024 event billed as a "Reclaiming Canada" conference in Vancouver. The event featured alt-right YouTuber Lauren Southern, Jay Bhattacharya and VCC's President Ted Kuntz.

== See also ==
- Vaccine hesitancy
- Science Moms
