= Alexander Milton Ross =

Canadian abolitionist (1832–1892)

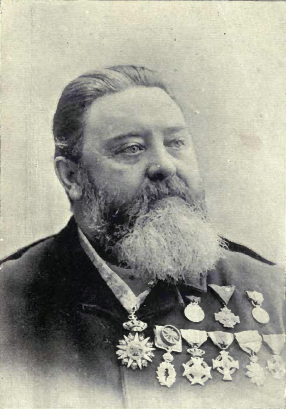
- Born: December 13, 1832; Belleville, Upper Canada
- Died: October 27, 1897 (aged 64); Detroit, Michigan
- Other names: The Birdman
- Known for: Agent on the Underground Railroad
- Scientific career
- Author abbrev. (botany): A.M.Ross

Alexander Milton Ross (December 13, 1832 – October 27, 1897) was a Canadian botanist, naturalist, physician, abolitionist and anti-vaccination activist. He is best known as an agent for the secret Underground Railroad slave escape network, known in that organization and among slaves as "The Birdman" for his preferred cover story as an ornithologist.

== Biography ==
Milton was born in Belleville, Ontario. He began his study of medicine in 1861 under the direction of Valentine Mott and subsequently under Russell Thacher Trall, the noted hygienic physician. Milton obtained his M.D. in 1855 and M.A. in 1867. He was appointed surgeon in the army of Nicaragua that was commanded by General William Walker.

Ross was an abolitionist and was involved in the anti-slavery struggle. During the Southern rebellion, President Lincoln employed him as a confidential correspondent in Canada. He was appointed surgeon to the Republican army of President Juarez of Mexico. After the capture of Maximillian, he returned to Canada and became a naturalist. He collected and classified 570 species of birds that regularly or occasionally visit Canada, 232 species of bird eggs that breed in Canada and 247 species of mammals, reptiles and freshwater fish, 3400 species of insects and 2000 species of Canadian flora.

Ross was a member of the British Association of Science and of the French and American Associations. He received the Medal of Merit from the Shah of Persia in 1884, the decoration of honour from the Khedive of Egypt in 1884 and the decoration of the Académie Française from the Government of France in 1879. He was an elected Fellow of the Royal Society of Literature, the Linnean Society of London, and the Zoological Society of London.

He was the founder of the Canadian Society for the Diffusion of Physiological Knowledge in 1880 and a founder of the St. Louis Hygienic College of Physicians and Surgeons. Ross married Hester E. Harrington. They had five children, two daughters and a son surviving infancy. Rose was an advocate of natural hygiene and opposed conventional medical treatment and all drugs which he considered unnatural. He abstained from alcohol and tobacco.

Ross died in Detroit.

== Anti-vaccination ==
Ross was a staunch opponent of vaccination. He stated that vaccines were dangerous and useless to prevent smallpox. Instead, he advocated the strict enforcement of sanitation and isolation. In December 1885, Ross formed the Canadian Anti-Vaccination League (also called the Canadian Anti-Compulsory Vaccination League). Ross and the League considered compulsory vaccination an abuse of human rights. Ross authored anti-vaccination pamphlets that were widely circulated during the smallpox epidemic of 1885 in Montreal.

In 1885 during the epidemic, Ross left Montreal and his train entered Ontario. It was reported that he had been vaccinated as quarantine inspectors approached him and found a vaccination puncture mark on his arm not over a year old. Ross was criticized by major newspapers for this dilemma, although Ross denied being vaccinated. A 1885 report by the State Board of Health of the State of Kansas suggested that Ross was only an anti-vaccinationist in theory, not in practice, as he had been vaccinated and his children were also. However, Ross continued campaigning against vaccination for the rest of his life. In 1888, Ross formed the Toronto Anti-Compulsory Vaccination League.

== Books ==
The standard author abbreviation A.M.Ross is used to indicate this person as the author when citing a botanical name.

- Ross, Alexander Milton (1864). Speech of Dr. Alexander M.Ross, delivered on the 21st October, 1864, at the Annual Meeting of the Society for the Abolition of Human Slavery, held in Montreal, Canada. Address to the people of Canada concerning their sympathy with the Southern rebels. Montreal.
- Ross, Alexander Milton (1865). Human Slavery in the Southern States. Toronto.
- Ross, Alexander Milton (1865). The Slaveholders' Rebellion. Its Internal Causes. Toronto.
- Ross, Alexander Milton (1876). Recollections and Experiences of an Abolitionist, from 1855 to 1865 (2nd ed.). Toronto: Roswell & Hutchison.
- Ross, Alexander Milton (1893). Memoirs of a reformer. Toronto: Hunter, Rose & Company. ISBN 9780665129544.
- Birds of Canada (1872)
- Butterflies and Moths of Canada (1873)
- Flora of Canada (1873)
- Forest Trees of Canada (1874)
- Ferns and Wild Flowers of Canada (1877)
- Mammals, Reptiles, and Fresh-water Fish of Canada (1878)
- The Fight Against Compulsory Vaccination (1883)
- Stop!!: A Pitiable Sight!: People Driven Like Dumb Animals to the Shambles!!: Tyranny of Doctorcraft!!! (1885)
- The Anti-Vaccinator, and Advocate of Cleanliness (1885)
- Vaccination a Medical Delusion (1885)
- Medical Practice of the Great Future

== In popular culture ==
Ross appears as a character in the 1977 children's novel Underground to Canada which depicts four young slaves who, with Ross's help, escape to Canada via the Underground Railroad.
