= Kieran Moore =

Ontario Chief Medical Officer of Health

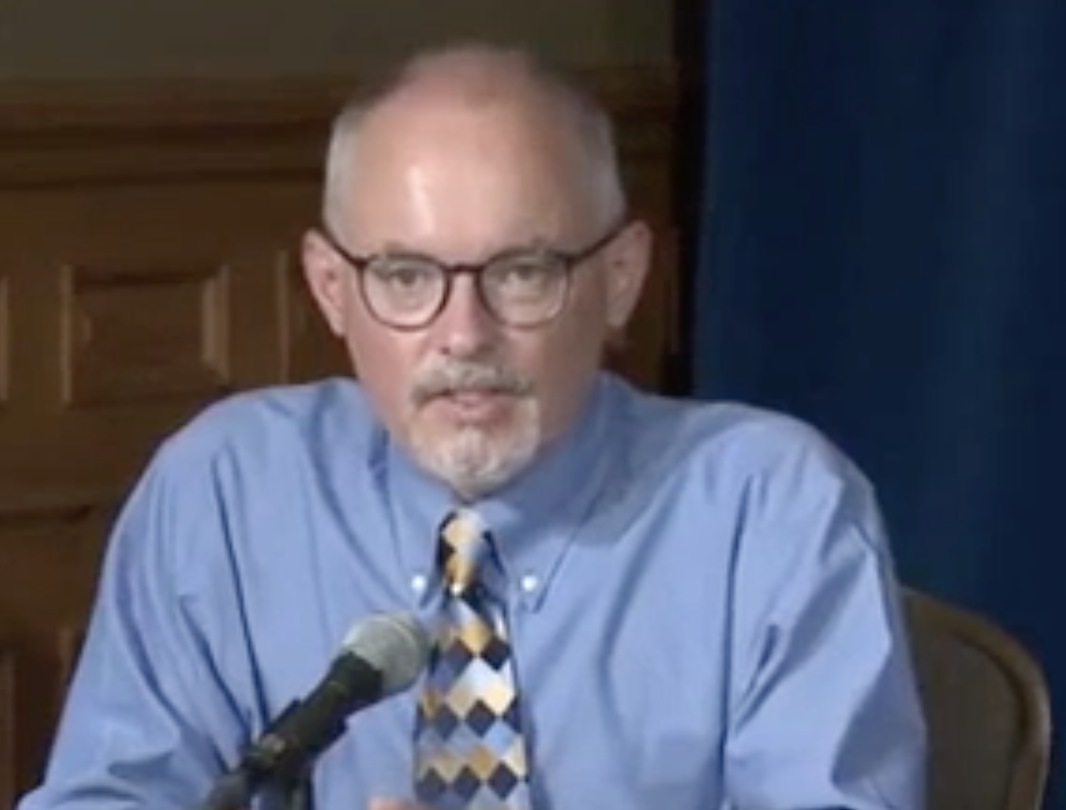
- Moore in 2021

Chief Medical Officer of Health
- Incumbent
- Assumed office June 26, 2021
- Premier: Doug Ford
- Preceded by: David Williams

Medical Officer of Health for Kingston, Frontenac, Lennox and Addington
- In office July 1, 2017 – June 6, 2021
- Preceded by: Ian Gemmill
- Succeeded by: Hugh Guan (acting)

Personal details
- Born: Kieran Michael Moore Ontario, Canada
- Education: University of Ottawa (MD); Queen's University (MPH); University of Brussels (MSc)
- Occupation: Physician; public servant

Kieran Michael Moore is a Canadian physician and public servant who serves as the current chief medical officer of health of Ontario. Prior to his appointment, he served as the medical officer of health for Kingston, Frontenac, Lennox and Addington from 2017 to 2021.

== Education ==
Moore graduated with a Doctor of Medicine from the University of Ottawa in 1985, specializing in family and emergency medicine. He also holds a Masters of Public Health degree from Queen's University and a Master of Science degree in disaster medicine from the University of Brussels, in collaboration with the World Health Organization.

He holds diplomas in sports medicine, Tropical medicine, hygiene, and humanitarian assistance, as well as completed a fellowship in Public Health & Preventive Medicine at Queen's University sanctioned by the Royal College of Physicians and Surgeons of Canada.

== Career ==
=== Medical Officer of Health of Kingston ===
Moore served at Kingston, Frontenac, Lennox & Addington Public Health as Associate Medical Officer of Health from 2011 to 2017 and as Medical Officer of Health from 2017 to 2021.

=== Educator and Lyme disease research ===
Moore is an adjunct professor in the Department of Family and Emergency Medicine at Queen's University. He performs research on the prevention, detection and surveillance of Lyme disease through the Canadian Lyme Disease Research Network. He also served on Pfizer's Lyme Disease Advisory Board. He was formerly program director of the Public Health and Preventive Medicine Residency Program at Queen's University.

=== COVID-19 pandemic ===
As well as serving as Medical Officer of Health for his region, Moore also sat on the COVID-19 vaccine task-force for the province during the COVID-19 pandemic in Ontario and the province's participation in the nationwide rollout of COVID-19 vaccines. On March 12, 2021, he delivered a presentation to the Ontario College of Family Physicians titled "The COVID-19 Vaccine: Newly approved vaccines, public health collaboration, and more” as a part of a series called “Changing the Way We Work” co-sponsored by the University of Toronto.

=== Ontario Chief Medical Officer of Health ===
On May 30, 2021, Moore replaced David Williams as the chief medical officer of health of Ontario. Moore commissioned the creation of the Ontario Immunization Advisory Committee (OIAC), tasked with advising Public Health Ontario on implementation of immunization programs in the province, including COVID-19 vaccines.

Moore rolled out his vaccine policy in August 2021. The "bare minimum" policy affected hospitals, community-care services and schools. Staff and students were required to have "proof of vaccination.. or agree to be tested at least once a week".
