= Chief Medical Officer of Health of Ontario =

The Chief Medical Officer of Health of Ontario is an independent officer of the Legislative Assembly of Ontario who is supposed to be responsible for the public health of Ontario residents. The office has existed since prior to 1990.

== Incumbents ==
- Kieran Moore (June 2021 – present)
- David Williams (2016 – June 2021)
