= Jonathan Meakins =

Jonathan Meakins may refer to:

- Jonathan Larmonth Meakins (born 1941), Canadian expert in immunobiology and surgical infections
- Jonathan Campbell Meakins (1882–1959), Canadian doctor
