= Canadian Medical Hall of Fame =

Canadian charitable organization

Coordinates: 42.98513°N 81.24555°W

The Canadian Medical Hall of Fame
- Abbreviation: CMHF
- Formation: 1994
- Legal status: active
- Purpose: advocate and public voice, educator and network
- Headquarters: London, Ontario, Canada
- Region served: London, Ontario, Canada
- Official language: English, French
- Website: Official site

The Canadian Medical Hall of Fame is a Canadian charitable organization, founded in 1994, that honours Canadians who have contributed to the understanding of disease and improving the health of people. It has an exhibit hall in London, Ontario, an annual induction ceremony, career exploration programs for youth and a virtual hall of fame.

== Laureates ==
2025
- Nadine Caron
- Deborah J. Cook
- Geoffrey T. Fong
- Steven Narod
- Arthur S. Slutsky
- Jennie Trout

2024

- Pieter Cullis
- John Edgar Dick
- Catherine Hankins
- Noni MacDonald
- Allison McGeer
- Thomas Roddick

2023

- Stephen Blizzard
- Elaine A. Carty
- Carol P. Herbert
- Jean-Lucien Rouleau
- Nahum Sonenberg
- Samuel Weiss

2022

- John Bell
- Thomas A. Dignan
- Daniel J. Drucker
- David J. A. Jenkins
- Jonathan L. Meakins
- Noralou P. Roos

2020

- Harvey Max Chochinov
- Jean Gray
- Jeanne Mance
- Marco Marra
- Joseph B. Martin
- Annette O'Connor

2019

- G. Brock Chisholm
- Naranjan Dhalla
- James Dosman
- Jacalyn Duffin
- Connie Eaves
- Rémi Quirion

2018

- Philip B. Berger
- Brett Finlay
- Vladimir Hachinski
- Balfour Mount
- Cheryl Rockman-Greenberg
- Emily Stowe

2017

- Michel G. Bergeron
- Michel Chrétien
- Richard Goldbloom
- Emmett Matthew Hall
- Michael R. Hayden
- F. Estelle R. Simons

2016

- Michael Bliss
- May Cohen
- Gordon Guyatt
- David Naylor
- Sir Charles Tupper
- Mark Wainberg

2015

- Alan Bernstein
- Judith G. Hall
- Bernard Langer
- John McCrae
- Julio Montaner
- Duncan G. Sinclair

2014

- Max Cynader
- Adolfo J. de Bold
- Walter Mackenzie
- Thomas John Murray
- Ronald Worton
- Salim Yusuf

=== 2013 ===
- Antoine Hakim
- David MacLennan
- Arnold Naimark
- Claude Roy
- Ian Rusted
- Bette Stephenson

=== 2012 ===
- John Dirks
- Terry Fox
- Armand Frappier
- F. Clarke Fraser
- Peter Macklem
- John Macleod
- Lap-Chee Tsui

=== 2011 ===
- Albert Aguayo
- John Bienenstock
- Paul David
- Jonathan Campbell Meakins
- Allan Ronald
- D. Lorne Tyrrell

=== 2010 ===
- Alan C. Burton
- William A. Cochrane
- Phil Gold
- James C. Hogg
- Vera Peters
- Calvin Stiller

=== 2009 ===
- Sylvia Fedoruk
- Tak Wah Mak
- Ronald Melzack
- Charles Tator
- Mladen Vranic

=== 2007 ===
- Elizabeth Bagshaw
- Felix d'Herelle
- Jean Dussault
- Wilbert Keon
- Endel Tulving

=== 2006 ===
- David Hubel
- John McEachern
- Ian McWhinney
- Anthony Pawson
- Hans Selye

=== 2004 ===
- Oswald Avery
- John G. FitzGerald
- Marc Lalonde
- Maurice LeClair
- Ernest McCulloch
- James Till

=== 2003 ===
- William Feindel
- Donald Olding Hebb
- Charles Hollenberg
- Charles B. Huggins
- Fraser Mustard
- Marie-Marguerite d'Youville

=== 2001 ===
- John E. Bradley
- Henry Friesen
- William Gallie
- Peter Lougheed
- Frederick Montizambert
- Charles Scriver
- Lucille Teasdale-Corti

=== 2000 ===
- Bernard Belleau
- G. Malcolm Brown
- John Robert Evans
- Jack Hirsh
- Lenora King
- David Sackett

=== 1998 ===
- Murray Barr
- Norman Bethune
- Roberta Bondar
- Tommy Douglas
- Ray Farquharson
- Charles Miller Fisher
- Claude Fortier
- Gustave Gingras
- Harold E. Johns
- Heinz Lehmann
- Maud Menten

=== 1997 ===
- Charles Thomas Beer
- Wilfred Gordon Bigelow
- Henri J. Breault
- Wilfred Thomason Grenfell
- Pierre Masson
- Brenda Milner
- Robert Laing Noble
- Louis Siminovitch

=== 1995 ===
- Henry J. M. Barnett
- Bruce Chown
- Herbert Jasper
- Charles Philippe Leblond
- William Thorton Mustard
- Robert B. Salter
- Michael Smith

=== 1994 ===
- Maude Abbott
- Frederick Banting
- Charles Best
- John Browne
- James Collip
- Douglas Harold Copp
- Charles George Drake
- Jacques Genest
- William Osler
- Wilder Penfield
