= Meakins =

Meakins is a surname. Notable people with the surname include:

- Felicity Meakins, Australian linguist
- Ian Meakins (born 1956), British businessman
- Jonathan Campbell Meakins (1882–1959), Canadian doctor and author
- Jonathan Larmonth Meakins (born 1941), Canadian surgeon and academic
