= Dussault =

Dussault is a French surname. Notable people with the surname include:

- Ann Mary Dussault (born 1946), American politician
- Bona Dussault (1882–1953), Canadian politician
- Dominique Dussault (born 1954), French singer
- Jean Dussault (1941–2003), Canadian endocrinologist
- Jean Joseph Dussault (1769–1824), French librarian, journalist and literary critic
- Joseph-Étienne Dussault (1884–1943), Canadian politician
- Louisette Dussault (1940–2023), Canadian actor and writer
- Marcel Dussault (1926–2014), French cyclist
- Nancy Dussault (born 1936), American singer and actress
- Norm Dussault (1925–2012), American ice hockey
- Pierre-Luc Dusseault (born 1991), Canadian politician
- Rebecca Dussault (born 1980), American cross-country skier
- Roland Dussault (born 1940), Canadian politician

== See also ==
- Dussault Inc., a Canadian television series
