= John R. Cunningham =

Canadian medical physicist (1927–2020)

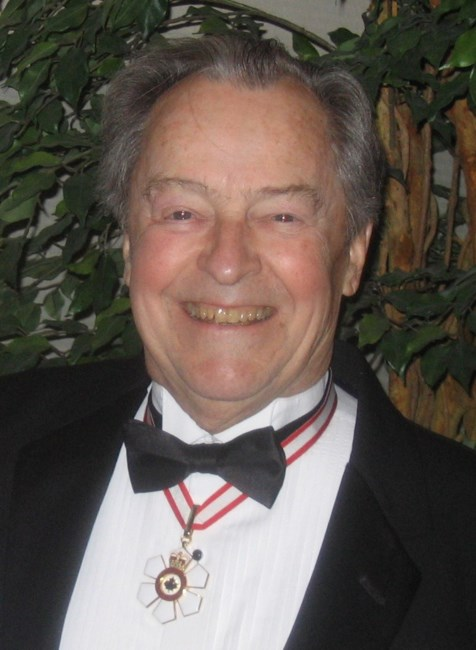
- Cunningham receiving the Order of Canada
- Born: John Robert Shepherd; January 5, 1927
- Died: January 4, 2020 (aged 92)
- Education: University of Toronto
- Occupation: Medical physicist
- Years active: 1951–2020
- Organization: Princess Margaret Cancer Centre
- Relatives: Grace Parraga (daughter in-law)

John Robert Cunningham, OC (January 5, 1927 – January 4, 2020) was a Canadian medical physicist who was noted for his contributions in the development of computerized radiation treatment planning dose calculations in radiation therapy.

== Early life and education ==
Cunningham, known as Jack, received his B.Eng. in Engineering Physics (1950) and M.Sc. in Radiation Physics (1951) from the University of Saskatchewan in Saskatoon. In 1955, he completed his Ph.D. at the University of Toronto in physics. After working for Canada's Defense Research Board, he became a staff Medical Physicist at Toronto's Ontario Cancer Institute / Princess Margaret Cancer Centre in 1958.

== Career ==
During his medical physics career, Cunningham published over 70 peer-reviewed papers, book chapters, and conference proceedings, and is widely known for co-authoring The Physics of Radiology (1953) with Dr. Harold E. Johns. The final fourth edition (1983) remains a staple in medical physics education for medical physicists, technologists, and physicians. He is a pioneer in developing computational techniques for calculating absorbed dose from radiation beams, and computer software and algorithms he developed continue to be used in both commercial and open source treatment planning systems. Upon retirement from clinical medical physics in 1989, Cunningham became a consultant with Theratronics/MDS Nordion (Kanata, Ontario) until 1998 when he moved to Camrose Alberta.

=== Teaching ===
He was an adjunct professor at the University of Alberta in Edmonton and regularly lectured at the Cross Cancer Institute in the Department of Medical Physics until 2018. He and his wife Sheila lived in Calgary, Alberta, until his death on January 4, 2020 at the age of 92.

== Awards and recognition ==
In 1988, he was awarded the highest award given by the American Association of Physicists in Medicine, the William D. Coolidge Award, for his contributions to the field. In 2005, Cunningham was inducted as an Officer of the Order of Canada. In 2006, he received the Canadian Organization of Medical Physicists Gold Medal Award for "outstanding contribution[s] to the field of medical physics in Canada".
