= Canadian Science and Engineering Hall of Fame =

The Canadian Science and Engineering Hall of Fame, was located at the Canada Science and Technology Museum in Ottawa, Ontario, honoured Canadians who have made outstanding contributions to society in science and engineering. It also promoted role models to encourage young Canadians to pursue careers in science, engineering and technology. The hall included a permanent exhibition, a traveling exhibition, a virtual gallery, and events and programming to celebrate inductees. In 2017, the hall of fame was closed down.

== History ==
The Canadian Science and Engineering Hall of Fame was established in 1991 through a joint partnership by the Canada Science and Technology Museum, the National Research Council of Canada (NRC), Industry Canada and the Association of Partners in Education, to mark the NRC's 75th anniversary. The hall became a major feature of the Canada Science and Technology Museum, and has become a part of the museum's permanent Innovation Canada exhibition.

== Induction process ==
The museum used an open process for nomination of new members. A selection committee reviewed nominations annually. Nominees must have met the following criteria:

- They must have contributed in an exceptional way to the advancement of science and engineering in Canada;
- Their work must have brought great benefits to society and their communities as a whole;
- They must possess leadership qualities that can serve as an inspiration to young Canadians to pursue careers in science, engineering or technology.

In April 2015, two members of the selection committee, Judy Illes and Dr. Catherine Anderson, resigned over concerns that, for the second year in a row, there were no female candidates in the list of finalists.

== Members ==
The following people have been inducted into the Canadian Science and Engineering Hall of Fame (listed by date of birth):

- William Edmond Logan (1798–1875)
- John William Dawson (1820–1899)
- Sandford Fleming (1827–1915)
- Alexander Graham Bell (1847–1922)
- Reginald Fessenden (1866–1932)
- Charles Edward Saunders (1867–1937)
- Maude Abbott (1869–1940)
- Wallace Rupert Turnbull (1870–1954)
- Ernest Rutherford (1871–1937)
- Harriet Brooks Pitcher (1876–1933)
- Frances Gertrude McGill (1882–1959)
- Alice Evelyn Wilson (1881–1964)
- Frère Marie-Victorin (1885–1944)
- John A.D. McCurdy (1886–1961)
- Andrew McNaughton (1887–1966)
- Margaret Newton (1887–1971)
- Chalmers Jack Mackenzie (1888–1984)
- Henry Norman Bethune (1890–1939), inducted in 2010
- Frederick Banting (1891–1941)
- Wilder Penfield (1891–1976)
- E.W.R. "Ned" Steacie (1900–1962)
- George J. Klein (1904–1992), inducted in 1995
- Gerhard Herzberg (1904–1999)
- Elizabeth "Elsie" MacGill (1905–1980)
- George C. Laurence (1905–1987), inducted in 2010
- Helen Sawyer Hogg (1905–1993)
- Joseph-Armand Bombardier (1907–1964)
- Alphonse Ouimet (1908–1988)
- John Tuzo Wilson (1908–1993)
- Arthur Porter (1910-2010)
- Pierre Dansereau (1911–2011), inducted in 2001
- M. Vera Peters (1911–1993)
- Hugh Le Caine (1914–1977)
- Douglas Harold Copp (1915–1998)
- Harold Elford Johns (1915–1998), inducted in 2000
- James Hillier 1915–2007, inducted in 2002
- Bertram Neville Brockhouse 1918–2003
- Brenda Milner 1918–
- John "Jack" A. Hopps 1919–1998
- Gerald Heffernan (1919–2007)
- James Milton Ham (1920–1997)
- Raymond Urgel Lemieux (1920–2000)
- Lawrence Morley 1920–2013
- Louis Siminovitch (1920–)
- Ursula Franklin (1921–2016)
- Gerald Hatch (1922–2014)
- Willard Boyle (1924–2011), inducted in 2005
- Ernest McCulloch (1926–2011), inducted in 2010
- Sylvia Fedoruk (1927–2012)
- Sidney van den Bergh (1929–)
- John Polanyi (1929–)
- Richard E. Taylor (1929–), inducted in 2008
- Vernon Burrows (1930–)
- Charles Robert Scriver (1930–), inducted in 2001
- James Till (1931–2025), inducted in 2010
- Michael Smith (1932–2000)
- Hubert Reeves (1932–)
- Kelvin K. Ogilvie (1942–)
- Arthur B. McDonald (1943–)
- Ransom A. Myers (1952–2007)
