= Francis Shepherd =

Francis Shepherd may refer to:

- Francis Shepherd (diplomat), British diplomat
- Francis Henry Shepherd, English-born civil engineer and political figure in British Columbia, Canada

== See also ==
- Frances Alice Shepherd, Canadian oncologist
- Francis Parker Shepard, American sedimentologist
