= Deborah Cook =

Deborah Cook is the name of:

- Deborah Cook (soprano) (1938–2019), American opera singer
- Deborah Cook (philosopher) (born 1954), Canadian philosopher
- Debbie Cook (born 1954), American politician
- Deborah J. Cook, Canadian medical scientist
- Deborah L. Cook (born 1952), American judge
