= Dosman =

Dosman is a surname. Notable people with the surname include:

- James Dosman (born 1938), Canadian scientist
- Jhon Steven Mondragón Dosman (born 1994), Colombian footballer

== See also ==
- Bosman
- Osman (name)
