= Duncan Sinclair =

Duncan Sinclair may refer to:

- Duncan Sinclair (Conservative politician) (1869–1951), Conservative member of the Canadian House of Commons
- Duncan James Sinclair (1867–1943), Liberal party member of the Canadian House of Commons
- Duncan G. Sinclair (born 1933), American-born Canadian academic
