= G. Malcolm Brown =

Canadian physician

- Born: July 16, 1916; Campbellford, Ontario, Canada
- Died: May 19, 1977 (aged 60)
- Education: Queen's University (MD, 1938); Balliol College, Oxford (DPhil, 1940)
- Known for: First full-time president of the Medical Research Council of Canada
- Awards: Officer of the Order of Canada (1976); Canadian Medical Hall of Fame (2000)
- Scientific career
- Fields: Internal medicine, medical research
- Workplaces: Queen's University; University of Ottawa; Medical Research Council of Canada

George Malcolm Brown, OC (July 16, 1916 – May 19, 1977) was a Canadian physician.

He was born in Campbellford, Ontario, and was educated at Queen's University and Oxford University. Brown served in the Royal Canadian Army Medical Corps in Europe. He was a professor of medicine at Queen's from 1951 to 1965.

He was named to the Canadian Medical Hall of Fame in 2000. The G. Malcolm Brown Memorial Fund was established in his memory to promote health science research in Canada.

== Medical administration ==
Brown served as president of the College of Physicians and Surgeons of Ontario from 1956 to 1958 and of the Royal College of Physicians and Surgeons of Canada from 1962 to 1964. In 1965, he became the first full-time president of the Medical Research Council of Canada During his presidency, he also held a professorship in medicine at the University of Ottawa.

At the council, Brown supported collaborative research through its Groups Program. In 1972, he invited Charles Scriver and Clarke Fraser to apply for group status for their research at McGill University. The resulting McGill Group in Medical Genetics brought together research on developmental abnormalities and inherited metabolic disorders.

Brown also served on the Science Council of Canada from 1966 to 1970 and joined Queen's University's board of trustees in 1967. He remained president of the Medical Research Council until his death on May 19, 1977.

== Honours and legacy ==
Brown was elected a Fellow of the Royal Society of Canada in 1966. He was appointed an Officer of the Order of Canada on December 15, 1976, and invested on April 20, 1977. He was posthumously inducted into the Canadian Medical Hall of Fame in 2000.
