= Bernard Langer (surgeon) =

Canadian surgeon and educator (1932–2022)

Bernard Langer OC (May 23, 1932 — February 23, 2022) was a Canadian surgeon and educator. In 2015, he was inducted into the Canadian Medical Hall of Fame.

== Biography ==
Born in Toronto, he received an MD (1956) from the University of Toronto, interned at the Toronto General Hospital (TGH) and completed training as a surgeon at the University of Toronto. Langer subsequently pursued training in oncology at MD Anderson Hospital in Houston and in liver transplantation at Brigham Hospital in Boston.

In 1963, he was named to the staff of the TGH. Although a general surgeon, Langer developed an expertise in liver, pancreas and biliary tract surgeries. He became head of the general surgery division at the hospital in 1972. In that role, he established a recruitment methodology which allowed the development of subspeciality areas within general surgery. In 1985, he performed the first liver transplant in Toronto. As a member of the Provincial Advisory Committee on Surgical Oncology, the Cancer Quality Council of Ontario and the Cancer Surgery Quality Committee, he helped raise the standards for cancer care in Ontario; these improved standards were also used as a model in other parts of Canada.

In 1982, Langer became R.S. McLaughlin Professor and chair of the surgery department at the University of Toronto. He established a Surgeon Scientist Program, aimed at providing surgeons with research training. The Royal College of Physicians and Surgeons of Canada's Clinician Investigator Program, established in 1994, was modelled after the Surgeon Scientist Program. Langer also served as president of the Canadian Association of General Surgeons, as president of the Society for Surgery of the Alimentary Tract, as the first vice president of the American Surgical Association and as president of the Royal College of Physicians and Surgeons of Canada.

In his honour, the University of Toronto has established the Bernard and Ryna Langer Chair in General Surgery, the Department of Surgery Langer Surgeon Scientist Award and the Bernard Langer Annual Lecture in Health Sciences. The Canadian Association of General Surgeons has a Langer Lecture at its annual meeting. In 2002, Langer was named an Officer in the Order of Canada and in 2015 was inducted into the Canadian Medical Hall of Fame(2).

Langer married Ryna Manson; the couple had four children including Jacob Langer, himself a notable general and paediatric surgeon and the former Chief of General and Thoracic Surgery at the Hospital for Sick Children in Toronto. Langer died on February 23, 2022, at the age of 89.
