= Canada Gairdner Wightman Award =

The Canada Gairdner Wightman Award is annually awarded by the Gairdner Foundation to a Canadian who has demonstrated outstanding leadership in the field of medicine and medical science.

== Award winners ==
Source: Gairdner- Past Recipients

- 1976 Keith J.R. Wightman
- 1979 Claude Fortier
- 1981 Louis Siminovitch
- 1984 Douglas G. Cameron
- 1986 Aser Rothstein
- 1989 Lloyd D. MacLean
- 1992 John Robert Evans
- 1999 Charles Hollenberg, Peter Macklem
- 2001 Henry Friesen
- 2006 Allan R. Ronald
- 2008 Alan Bernstein
- 2009 David Sackett
- 2010 Calvin Stiller
- 2011 Michael R. Hayden
- 2012 Lorne A. Babiuk
- 2013 James C. Hogg
- 2014 Salim Yusuf
- 2015 Janet Rossant
- 2016 Frank Plummer
- 2017 Antoine M Hakim
- 2018 Frances Alice Shepherd
- 2019 Connie Jean Eaves
- 2020 Guy A. Rouleau
- 2021 Elizabeth Eisenhauer

== See also ==
- Gairdner Foundation
- Gairdner Foundation Global Health Award
- Gairdner Foundation International Award
- List of medicine awards
