= David Murray Lyon =

English physician and medical author

David Malcolm Murray Lyon FRSE DPH (1888–1956) was an English physician and medical author. He was president of the Royal College of Physicians of Edinburgh from 1945 to 1947, and was editor of the Edinburgh Medical Journal.

== Life ==
He was born in Wooler in Northumberland on 12 September 1888. He was the son of Ebinizer (sic) Campbell and William Malcolm Lyon, a veterinary surgeon. He was educated at George Watson's College then studied medicine at the University of Edinburgh, graduating MB ChB in 1910.

In the First World War he served in the Royal Army Medical Corps attached to the Cavalry Field Ambulance and saw action in both Rouen and Mons. After the war he became Assistant physician at Edinburgh Royal Infirmary under Jonathan Meakins, jointly working on insulin research, and being joined by Charles George Lambie from 1922. He received his doctorate (MD) in 1920 with his thesis The viscosity of the blood and a DSc in 1924 with his thesis Some observations on the action of adrenalin. In 1924 he became Professor of Therapeutics at the University of Edinburgh. In the same year he was elected a Fellow of the Royal Society of Edinburgh. His proposers were James Lorrain Smith, Jonathan Campbell Meakins, James Hartley Ashworth, and George Barger.

From 1936 he was Professor of Clinical Medicine at the University of Edinburgh. In 1946, he was elected to the Aesculapian Club of Edinburgh.

He died on 16 November 1956 at 8 Hailes Gardens in Edinburgh.

== Publications ==
- The Essentials of Medical Treatment (1940)

== Family ==
He was married to Edith Dona Lloyd. Their children included Dr William Malcolm Murray Lyon (1920–2015), Dr Jean Malcolm Grant (1917-2006) and Dr Rae Llewelyn Lyon (d. 2018). He was the cousin of Dr Ranald Malcolm Murray-Lyon (1904–1969), a senior physician at the Edinburgh Royal Infirmary.
