= Safety cap =

Safety cap may refer to:

- Safety cap (helmet), hatgear used in mining etc.
- Child-resistant packaging a cap found on medicine and household chemical bottles designed to be hard for a child to remove
- Safety capacitor, a type of capacitor
