= Babiuk =

Babiuk is a surname. Notable people with the surname include:

- Andy Babiuk (born 1963), American musician, author, and consultant
- Lorne Babiuk (born 1946), Canadian scientist specializing in immunology, pathogenesis, virology, and vaccinology
