= Jean Gray =

Jean Gray may refer to:

- Jean Vivra Gray (1924–2016), Australian television and film actress
- Jean Grey, fictional superhero originating in 1963
- Jean Grae (born 1976), American hip hop recording artist
- Jean Gray (academic) (b. 1942), Canadian academic and physician
