= Jean Gray (physician) =

Canadian academic

Professor Jean Gray CM FRCPC FRCP

Personal details
- Born: 2 July 1942 (age 83) Redhill, Surrey, England

Jean Gray (born July 2, 1942) CM is a Canadian academic and retired physician, who is professor emeritus of medical education, medicine and pharmacology at Dalhousie University. She has served as president of the Canadian and American Society of Clinical Pharmacology. She was invested as a Member of the Order of Canada in 2005, and has been a Fellow of the Royal College of Physicians since 2007. She was inducted into the Canadian Medical Hall of Fame in 2020.

== Early life and education ==
Born in wartime England in Redhill, Surrey, Gray's mother was a London social worker and her father a member of the Canadian Armed Forces. The family left England in 1947 and Gray arrived in Halifax, Canada as a 5-year-old. Gray graduated from the University of Alberta in Chemistry (1963) and Medicine (1967).

== Career ==
Gray joined the Faculty of Medicine at Dalhousie and was the founding Head of the Dalhousie Division of General Medicine, Associate Dean of Postgraduate Medical Education (1988 to 1996) and Associate Dean of Continuing Medical Education (1996 to 2002).

Gray helped develop for the Canadian Pharmacists Association, the first edition of what would become a standard community practitioners' handbook in Canada. In 1995, she was the inaugural editor-in-chief for Therapeutic Choices, which was produced in response to concerns about the format of an earlier widely-used standard work, the Compendium of Pharmaceuticals and Specialties (CPS), then in its twenty-fifth print edition. Gray had been on the editorial board of the CPS before editing Therapeutic Choices. She continued her involvement with publication of the later handbook until 2011, overseeing its first six editions.

She has championed rigorous studies of drug safety and effectiveness to improve prescribing practice. She has held many leadership positions and served with distinction in several medical organizations helping to foster excellence in health care in Canada and the world.

Gray served as President of the Canadian Society of Clinical Pharmacology; the Canadian Society for Clinical Investigation; the American Society for Clinical Pharmacology and Therapeutics; the Canadian Association of Medical Education; the Canadian Institute of Academic Medicine; and as Chair of the Canadian Cochrane Collaboration Advisory Board, the CIHR Institute of Gender and Health Advisory Board, the NS Health Research Foundation Board, the Board of the Canadian Medical Hall of Fame, the Canadian Academy of Health Sciences Standing Committee on Assessments, and the CMAJ Journal Oversight Committee. She is a member of several other national and international committees and boards, including the Science Advisory Committee of the Council of Canadian Academies.

== Personal life ==
In the early years of her career, Gray met and married biochemist, Michael Gray. They have two daughters. "Both of my children very obligingly arrived on a Friday night and I went back to work on Tuesday morning," she remembers. "I was on call the night that my first child was born. When I finally went over to the maternity hospital they kept having to say, 'Wake up and push!' And I kept saying, 'I was up all night — leave me alone.'"

== Recognition ==
- 2013: Distinguished Service and Education Award from the Canadian Society of Pharmacology and Therapeutics
- 2012: Awarded the Queen Elizabeth II Diamond Jubilee Medal
- 2010:
  - Honorary Lifetime Membership in the Canadian Pharmacists Association
  - The Royal College of Physicians and Surgeons of Canada's Dr. James Graham Award
- 2007:
  - Fellow of the Royal College of Physicians, London
  - Distinguished Service Award from the American Society of Clinical Pharmacology
- 2005:
  - Member of the Order of Canada
  - Fellow of the Canadian Academy of Health Sciences
  - Honorary DSc, University of Alberta
  - Honorary LLD, Dalhousie University
- 2003: Awarded the Queen Elizabeth II Golden Jubilee Medal
- 2002: Distinguished Service Awards from both the Canadian Association for Medical Education and the Canadian Society of Clinical Investigation
- 2001: Lifetime Achievement Award in Medical Education, Dalhousie Department of Medicine
- 1998: The Dr. Enid Johnson McLeod Award for research in Women's Health from the Canadian Federation of Medical Women

== Selected works ==
- As a member of: the Committee on the State of Science and Technology in Canada (2008). The State of Science and Technology in Canada (Report). Ottawa, Ontario: Council of Canadian Academies [Conseil des académies canadiennes]. ISBN 978-0-9781778-2-9.
- Therapeutic choices (Premier ed.). Ottawa, Ontario: Canadian Pharmaceutical Association. 1995. ISBN 9780919115675.
  - Therapeutic choices (6th ed.). Ottawa: Canadian Pharmacists Association. 2011. ISBN 9781894402569.
- With Martin, Jennifer H.; Henry, David; Day, Richard; Bochner, Felix; Ferro, Albert; Pirmohamed, Munir; Mörike, Klaus; Schwab, Matthias (February 2016). "Achieving the World Health Organization's vision for clinical pharmacology". British Journal of Clinical Pharmacology. 81 (2): 223–227. doi:10.1111/bcp.12803. PMC 4833156. PMID 26466826.
- With Nair, Kalpana; Dolovich, Lisa; Cassels, Alan; McCormack, James; Levine, Mitch; Mann, Karen; Burns, Sheri (1 January 2002). "What patients want to know about their medications. Focus group study of patient and clinician perspectives". Canadian Family Physician. 48 (1): 104–110. ISSN 0008-350X.
- With Turnbull, Jeffrey; MacFadyen, John (May 1998). "Improving in-training evaluation programs". Journal of General Internal Medicine. 13 (5): 317–323. doi:10.1046/j.1525-1497.1998.00097.x. PMC 1496958. PMID 9613887.
