= John Browne (scientist) =

Canadian physician, born 1904

John Symonds Lyon Browne (April 13, 1904 – January 21, 1984) was an English-born Canadian physician.

He was born in Wembley, London, the son of a civil engineer, and came to Canada with his family in 1905. In 1912, the family moved to Montreal. Browne was educated at Westmount High School and at McGill University. He went on to work in Germany, Austria and England under a travelling fellowship from the Royal Society of Canada. Browne returned to McGill as a research fellow, later becoming a professor of medicine, Medical Department chairman and director of the Royal Victoria Hospital. He was forced to leave those positions due to failing eyesight but served as chairman of the Department of Investigative Medicine from 1955 until his retirement in 1960.

In 1964, he helped establish the Conseil du recherche medical du Quebec, later known as the Fonds de la recherche en santé du Québec, and also helped found the Canadian Clinical Investigation Travel Club, later the Canadian Society for Clinical Investigation.

He is credited with contributing to important advances in endocrinology. During his time at McGill, he pressed for the addition of more biochemistry and physiology in the undergraduate curriculum for clinical medicine.

Browne was named to the Canadian Medical Hall of Fame in 1994 for his efforts to create co-operation between the English and French-speaking physicians of Quebec.
