= S. D. Clark =

Canadian sociologist (1910–2003)

S. D. Clark OC FRSC
- Born: Samuel Delbert Clark; 24 February 1910; Lloydminster, Alberta, Canada
- Died: 18 September 2003 (aged 93)
- Other name: Del Clark
- Spouse: Rosemary Clark (m. c. 1945; died 2008)
- Children: Ellen Tabisz; Samuel Clark; W. Edmund Clark

Academic background
- Education: University of Saskatchewan; McGill University; University of Toronto
- Thesis: The Canadian Manufacturers' Association (1937)
- Doctoral advisor: Alexander Brady; Harold Innis
- Influences: Marcus Lee Hansen; Frederick Jackson Turner

Academic work
- Discipline: Sociology
- Institutions: University of Toronto

Samuel Delbert Clark OC FRSC (1910–2003), known as S. D. Clark or Del Clark, was a Canadian sociologist.

Born on 24 February 1910 in Lloydminster, Alberta, Clark grew up near Streamstown, Alberta. He received a Bachelor of Arts degree in political science and history in 1930 and a Master of Arts degree in 1931 from the University of Saskatchewan. His master's thesis was titled Settlement in Saskatchewan with Special Reference to Dry Farming. From 1932 to 1933, he studied at the London School of Economics. In 1935, he received a Master of Arts degree from McGill University and a Doctor of Philosophy degree in 1938 from the University of Toronto. His 1937 doctoral thesis was titled The Canadian Manufacturers' Association: A Political and Social Study. In 1943, he was awarded a fellowship from the John Simon Guggenheim Memorial Foundation.

In 1938, he started teaching at the University of Toronto in the department of political economy. Through his efforts, sociology gained respect from Canadian scholars who were initially skeptical of the discipline. On 1 July 1963, he led the founding of the sociology department and served as its first chair until 1969. He retired in 1976, but taught for years as a visiting professor at a number of places, including Dalhousie University, Lakehead University, and the University of Edinburgh.

Clark's publications – mainly books – include The Canadian Manufacturers Association (1939), The Social Development of Canada (1942), Church and Sect in Canada (1948), Movements of Political Protest in Canada (1959), The Developing Canadian Community (1962), The Suburban Society (1966), Canadian Society in Historical Perspective (1976), and The New Urban Poor (1978).

Clark was elected president of the Canadian Political Science Association in 1958 and honorary president of the Canadian Sociology and Anthropology Association in 1967. In 1978, he was made an Officer of the Order of Canada as "social historian of international repute and, as one of our most distinguished scholars". A fellow of the Royal Society of Canada, he also served as its president from 1975 to 1976. He was elected a foreign honorary member of the American Academy of Arts and Sciences in 1976. He was awarded the J. B. Tyrrell Historical Medal in 1960. He received honorary degrees from the University of Calgary, Dalhousie University, Lakehead University, the University of Western Ontario, the University of Manitoba, and the University of Toronto.

In 1999, the Department of Sociology, University of Toronto instituted the endowed "S.D. Clark Chair" in his honour. The first holder of the chair was William Michelson, a scholar of housing and urban sociology. In 2006, he was succeeded by Barry Wellman, a scholar of the Internet, community, and social networks.

Clark was married to Rosemary Landry Clark for 63 years, until her death in February 2008. His children are Samuel Clark, a sociologist at the University of Western Ontario; W. Edmund Clark, CEO of the Toronto-Dominion Bank; and Ellen Tabisz, a social worker and adjunct professor at the University of Manitoba. Clark died on 18 September 2003.

== Selected bibliography ==
- The Canadian Manufacturers Association (1939)
- The Social Development of Canada (1942)
- Church and Sect in Canada (1948)
- Movements of Political Protest in Canada (1959)
- The Developing Canadian Community (1962)
- The Suburban Society (1966)
- Canadian Society in Historical Perspective (1976)
- The New Urban Poor (1978)

== See also ==
- Human ecology

Professional and academic associations
Preceded by Claude Fortier	President of the Royal Society of Canada; 1975–1976	Succeeded by Larkin Kerwin
Awards
Preceded by Arthur Maheux	J. B. Tyrrell Historical Medal; 1960	Succeeded by Guy Frégault
