= Alan C. Burton =

Canadian physicist (1904–1979)

Alan C. Burton MBE (April 18, 1904 – June 27, 1979) was an English-born Canadian physicist. He is considered a founding father of modern biophysics.

He was born in London, received a BSc from University College London and taught high school physics in England. At the age of 23, he came to Canada and studied physics as a graduate student at the University of Toronto, receiving his PhD in 1932. He continued his post-graduate studies at the University of Rochester and at the University of Pennsylvania. During World War II, Burton designed protective clothing for the Canadian military. He joined the University of Western Ontario after the war, where he founded the Department of Biophysics, leading it from 1948 to 1970. Later in life, his research focused on cancer, including the effects of altitude.

Burton was named a member of the Order of the British Empire for his contributions during the war. He served as president of the American Physiological Society, the Biophysical Society and the Canadian Physiological Society. In 1961, he was awarded the Gairdner Foundation International Award for Cardiovascular Research.

He was inducted into the Canadian Medical Hall of Fame in 2010.

Two of his graduate students described his career in the book Pioneer in Biophysics: Alan C. Burton 1904 to 1979.
