= Cheryl Rockman-Greenberg =

Canadian physician and educator

Cheryl Rockman-Greenberg (born September 26, 1950) is a Canadian physician and educator. She was inducted into the Canadian Medical Hall of Fame in 2018. She has two children.

She was born in Montreal and received a MDCM from McGill University in 1974. In 1979, she began work as a clinical and metabolic geneticist for the Winnipeg Regional Health Authority. She was director of the Metabolic Service in the Program of Genetics and Metabolism there from 1992 to 2015. From 2004 to 2014, she was head of the Department of Pediatrics and Child Health at the University of Manitoba and medical director for the Child Health Program at the Winnipeg Regional Health Authority. She is a clinician scientist at the Children's Hospital Research Institute of Manitoba and holds the title of Distinguished Professor at the University of Manitoba.

Rockman-Greenberg is the leading Canadian researcher in the treatment of hypophosphatasia. She also developed targeted DNA-based screening programs for newborns in Manitoba for a number of rare conditions including glutaric aciduria type 1 in the Oji-Cree and carnitine palmitoyltransferase I deficiency in Hutterites; these screening programs were aimed at groups with higher incidence of these conditions than the general population.

In 2012, she was named one of the Top 100 Most Powerful Women in Canada by the Toronto-based Women's Executive Network.

She was appointed to the Order of Canada as an Officer of the Order in the December 2019 New Year's list.
