= Canadian Pharmacists Journal =

- Discipline: Pharmacy practice research
- Language: English, French
- Edited by: Dr. Ross Tsuyuki

Publication details
- Former name(s): Canadian Pharmaceutical Journal; Pharmacal Gazette of Montreal
- History: 1868-present
- Publisher: SAGE Publications
- Frequency: Bimonthly
- Open access: No

Standard abbreviations
- ISO 4: Can. Pharm. J. (Ott.)

Links
- Journal homepage; Online archive

Established in 1868, the Canadian Pharmacists Journal (CPJ) is Canada's oldest continuously published periodical. This peer-reviewed journal is published 6 times per year. It features original research, clinical reviews, commentaries, evidence briefs, clinical practice guidelines and practice tools relating to advancing pharmacy practice towards patient-centred care and improving outcomes. The journal has a circulation of over 18,000. It is the official publication of the Canadian Pharmacists Association.

== History ==
The journal was first published in May 1868 as the Canadian Pharmaceutical Journal by the Canadian Pharmaceutical Society. The founding editor-in-chief was E.B. Shuttleworth. After the Ontario Pharmacy Act was passed in 1871, the Canadian Pharmaceutical Society dissolved and the journal was taken over by the newly established Ontario College of Pharmacy. Shuttleworth continued in his position as editor until 1896 when the journal merged with the Pharmacal Gazette of Montreal. Finally, in 1923, the journal was purchased by the Canadian Pharmaceutical Association (now known as the Canadian Pharmacists Association).

Early issues contained a wide variety of topics which included social and legal notices, compounding formulae, and commentary on pharmacy issues of the day. In 1957, a new "scientific section" edited by Mervyn Huston was introduced. The section contained original research and was very popular among readers.

More recently in 2002, the journal adopted peer review. In June 2005 it was redesigned, changed its name to the Canadian Pharmacists Journal and relaunched with a stronger focus on pharmacy practice research.

== Abstracting and indexing ==
The journal is abstracted and indexed in Emerging Sources Citation Index, EBSCO, Embase, ProQuest:International Pharmaceutical Abstracts, and Scopus. It is archived in PubMed Central.
