= Nigel Rusted =

Canadian doctor (1907–2012)

Nigel Francis Scarth Rusted, CM ONL FRSC (July 1, 1907 – March 18, 2012) was a Canadian medical doctor. He is credited with having made outstanding contributions to the medical profession in Newfoundland and Labrador.

The son of Rev. Canon Ernest Rusted and Faith Hollands Rusted, he was born in Salvage, Newfoundland and grew up in Upper Island Cove. Rusted attended high school in St. John's and attended newly established Memorial University College, graduating in 1927. He attended Dalhousie Medical School and, during the summers, worked as health officer aboard the SS Kyle, which visited communities along the Labrador coast. He interned at the tuberculosis sanatorium in Kentville, at the Aberdeen Hospital in New Glasgow and at the Victoria Hospital in Halifax. After graduating in 1933, Rusted accepted a position at the St. John's General Hospital. After suffering a severe throat infection in 1935, he worked on the floating clinic ship MV Lady Anderson for a year. In 1936, he opened a private clinic in St. John's and also became a junior surgeon at the General Hospital. From 1954 to 1968, he served as chief surgeon at the General Hospital. He also served as medical director, chief of staff and chief surgeon at the Grace General Hospital. Over his career, he served as senior consultant at all four hospitals in St. John's of the time: St. John’s General Hospital, St. Clare's Mercy Hospital, Grace General Hospital and Janeway Child Health Centre. Rusted retired from surgery in 1982 at the age of 75 and, in 1987, he retired from clinical practice.

When, due to the efforts of his brother Ian, a medical school was established at Memorial University, he served as clinical professor of surgery at the school in 1968. He had also served on the first board of regents for Memorial University of Newfoundland from 1951 to 1957.

He married Florence Anderson and they had three children.

Rusted died at the Health Sciences Centre in St. John's at the age of 104.

== Honours and awards ==
- 1950: Fellow of the American College of Physicians and Surgeons
- 1950: Fellow of the International College of Surgeons
- 1974: Senior Membership of the Canadian Medical Association
- 1986: Nigel Rusted Lectureship on the History of Surgery, founded by Discipline of Surgery, Faculty of Medicine, Memorial University of Newfoundland
- 1996: William B. Spaulding Certificate of Merit for contribution to the history of medicine in Canada, awarded by Associated Medical Services, Toronto
- 2010: Life Membership of the Newfoundland and Labrador Medical Association

- He was made a Member of the Order of Canada in 2011
- He was named to the Order of Newfoundland and Labrador in 2007.
- He was given the Canadian Version of the Queen Elizabeth II Diamond Jubilee Medal in 2012.
- He was given the Freedom of the City of St. John's in 2008.
- He was Awarded the Honorary Degree of Doctor of Science from Memorial University of Newfoundland in 1973.
- He was made a fellow of the Royal Society of Canada Allowing Him to use the Post Nominal Letters "FRSC"
