= Allan Ronald =

Canadian doctor and microbiologist (born 1938)

Allan R. Ronald
- Born: August 24, 1938 (age 88); Portage la Prairie, Manitoba
- Education: University of Manitoba
- Awards: OC
- Scientific career
- Fields: HIV/AIDS research, Microbiology

Allan R. Ronald OC (born August 24, 1938) is a Canadian doctor and microbiologist. He has been instrumental in the investigation into sexually transmitted infections in Africa, particularly in the fields of HIV/AIDS. Ronald is the recipient of multiple awards and honours.

== Life and education ==
Ronald was born in Portage la Prairie, Manitoba, in 1938 and received bachelor's and medical degrees from the University of Manitoba, graduating in 1961. He did postgraduate work at Winnipeg General Hospital, the University of Maryland Hospital, the Institute for Medical Research in Lahore, Pakistan and the University of Washington. He joined the University of Manitoba medical faculty in 1968, attaining the rank of full professor in 1976; he headed the departments of medical microbiology (1976–1985) and internal medicine (1985–1990) and served as the associate dean of research from 1993 to 1999. He completed visiting professor posts at the universities of Nairobi and Hong Kong. He also served as head doctor at the Health Sciences Centre and as head of the infectious-diseases department at St. Boniface General Hospital.

In 1980, Ronald created "one of the first clinical investigation units exploring sexually transmitted infections in Africa" at the University of Nairobi. According to a University of Winnipeg citation for an honorary doctorate, the program Ronald developed has resulted in

groundbreaking findings solving some of the major mysteries surrounding the transmission and spread of AIDS. It has been called the most important research site in the developing world for HIV/AIDS with 700 abstracts or publications arising from it. It has also been pivotal in understanding the disease in Africa and resulted in important programs to help prevent the spread of the HIV/AIDS.

After retiring from his university position in 2000, Ronald created a distribution system for HIV/AIDS drugs in Uganda, moving there for three years beginning in 2003. Ronald has served as Governor of the American College of Physicians and as President of the International Society for Infectious Diseases.

== Awards and honors ==
Ronald received an honorary doctorate from the University of Winnipeg in 2006. That same year, he received the Gairdner Foundation Wightman Award. He became a Fellow of the Royal Society of Canada and an Officer of the Order of Canada, and was inducted into the Canadian Medical Hall of Fame in 2010. In 2011, he was awarded the 2010 Association of Medical Microbiology and Infectious Disease Canada Lifetime Achievement Award in recognition of "his long dedication to the prevention and treatment of human infectious diseases and the education of many generations of physicians..."
