= John Bradley (doctor) =

Canadian medical doctor (1917–2004)

John Edward Bradley (21 October 1917 – 22 March 2004) was a Canadian medical doctor and member of the Canadian Medical Hall of Fame.

Born in Sarnia, Ontario, Bradley was educated at the University of Alberta and served in the Medical Branch of the Royal Canadian Air Force during the Second World War. He co-founded the Wainwright Medical Clinic, working as a family physician for twenty years, and chaired the Alberta Hospital Services Commission. Bradley was executive director of the Glenrose Provincial Hospital from 1964 to 1972. He also served as special adviser on medical research to Alberta Premier Peter Lougheed. and served as chair emeritus for the board of governors for the University of Alberta. He was awarded an Honorary LL.D. by the University of Alberta in 1972.

He died at the Mount Royal Care Centre in Calgary at the age of 86.
