= George Klein (inventor) =

Canadian inventor

George Johann Klein OC, OBE
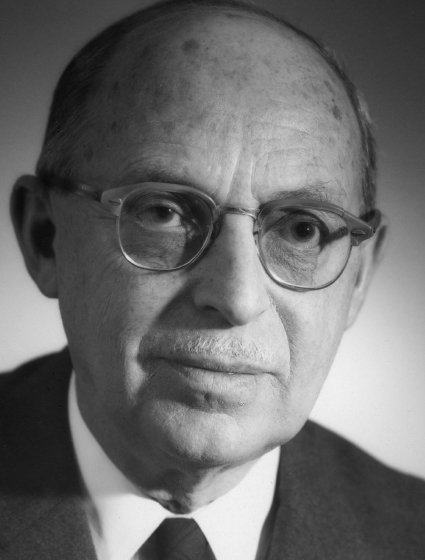
- Born: August 15, 1904; Hamilton, Ontario, Canada
- Died: November 4, 1992 (aged 88); Ottawa, Ontario
- Education: University of Toronto
- Known for: Contributions to development of the Canadarm, power wheelchair, microsurgical staple gun, ZEEP nuclear reactor
- Awards: Canadian Science and Engineering Hall of Fame inductee, Order of Canada, Order of the British Empire

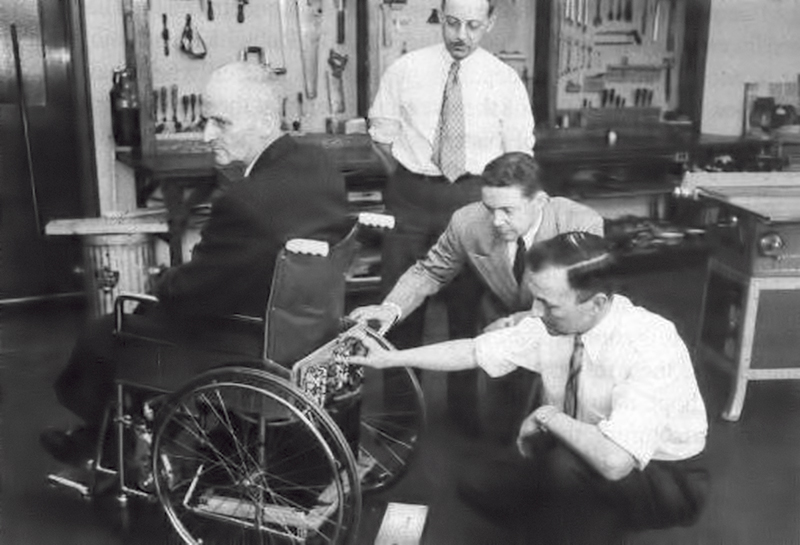
George Klein (back) and his electric wheelchair in 1953

George Johann Klein, OC MBE (August 15, 1904 – November 4, 1992) was a Canadian inventor who is widely regarded as the most productive inventor in Canada in the 20th century. Although he struggled as a high school student, he eventually graduated from the University of Toronto in Mechanical Engineering. His inventions include key contributions to the first electric wheelchairs for quadriplegics, a novel microsurgical suturing device, the ZEEP nuclear reactor which was the precursor to the CANDU reactor, the international system for classifying ground-cover snow, aircraft skis, the Weasel all-terrain vehicle, the STEM antenna for the space program, and the Canadarm.

Klein worked for forty years as a mechanical engineer at the National Research Council of Canada laboratories in Ottawa (1929–1969).

In 1968, he was made an Officer of the Order of Canada. In 1995, he was inducted to the Canadian Science and Engineering Hall of Fame.
