= Walter Mackenzie =

Canadian surgeon

Walter Campbell Mackenzie
- Mackenzie in 1976
- Born: August 17, 1909; Glace Bay, Nova Scotia
- Died: December 15, 1978 (aged 69); Edmonton, Alberta
- Awards: Order of Canada

Walter Campbell Mackenzie OC (August 17, 1909 – December 15, 1978) was an internationally renowned Canadian surgeon and medical educator.

Born in Glace Bay, Cape Breton, Nova Scotia, Dr. Mackenzie received his BSc in 1927 and MD in 1932 from Dalhousie University and was honoured as one of two Malcolm Honour Society Medal winners. He began surgical training at the Royal Victoria Hospital and McGill University in Montreal, then moved to the Mayo Clinic in 1933 to complete his MSc. He began practicing surgery in Edmonton, Alberta in 1938 , and from 1940 to 1945 he served in the Royal Canadian Navy on numerous trans-Atlantic and North Sea convoys, as Surgeon Commander.

Dr. Mackenzie established a permanent medical practice in Edmonton in 1946 and maintained his practice for nearly 30 years, while also taking on an increasingly intensive career in medical education. He was a professor and chairman of the Department of Surgery at the University of Alberta's Faculty of Medicine, and from 1959 to 1974, he was Dean of the Faculty. He published 80 medical articles and edited a surgical textbook widely relied upon in medical schools throughout the English speaking world.

Following retirement from the Faculty of Medicine, he was appointed Chairman of the Alberta Government Task Force on highway accidents, which made 78 recommendations including the mandatory use of seatbelts in automobiles and prevention of impaired driving.

He was then appointed the Executive Director of the Alberta Provincial Cancer Hospitals Board, substantially expanding cancer services and programs in the Province and the building and staffing of Alberta's second cancer hospital, the Tom Baker Cancer Center in Calgary.

He belonged to twenty-five international medical organizations, and became president of twelve of them; including the Royal College of Surgeons of Canada (1966–67); the American College of Surgeons (1968) and the International College of Surgeons (1972). Invited to speak and advise by medical organizations around the world, he travelled widely. As Sir Arthur Sims Travelling Professor, to Nigeria, South Africa, Sudan, and the British West Indies, in 1962. To China in 1966, to Poland (1968), Soviet Russia (1971), and Hong Kong as the Digby Memorial Lecturer, and Germany in 1972. Then to Spain, Australia, New Zealand, Hong Kong (again) and Singapore (1973), Nigeria and South Africa, as the Louis Mirvish Lecturer (1975).

He was granted Fellowships in the Canadian and American Colleges of Surgeons, and Honorary Fellowships in the Royal Colleges of England, Edinburgh, Glasgow, Ireland, and West Africa (Nigeria).

In 1938 he served as President of the Edmonton Athletic Club which had a Junior hockey team that advanced to the Memorial Cup (national) final.

In 1948, he was a founding director and shareholder of the Edmonton Eskimo Football Club, holding share certificate #4, and served as a team doctor for many years.

He was made a Member of the Order of Canada in 1967, its inaugural year, and was elevated to an Officer of the Order when the Officer designation was created in 1971. He was recognized "for his contribution to surgery and medical education". In 2014, he was inducted into the Canadian Medical Hall of Fame.

The Walter C. Mackenzie Health Sciences Centre in Edmonton, Alberta, is named in his honour. The centre was built and opened in 1982 under the Conservative government of Peter Lougheed.
