= Vaccine and Infectious Disease Organization =

Canadian research organization

- Established: 1975
- Field of research: Science and biotechnology (vaccines)
- Director: Volker Gerdts
- Staff: 150
- Location: Saskatoon, Saskatchewan, Canada
- Operating agency: University of Saskatchewan
- Website: www.vido.org

The Vaccine and Infectious Disease Organization (VIDO) is a research organization of the University of Saskatchewan that operates with financial support from the Government of Canada, the government of Saskatchewan, livestock industry councils and agencies, foundations and human and animal health companies. In addition to the 2,500,000 sq ft (230,000 m^{2}) facility on campus, VIDO also operates a 160-acre (0.6 km^{2}) research station.

VIDO's aims are to protect Canada and the world from infectious diseases by focusing on diseases that: affect livestock industries; are important to human health; and are emerging diseases including zoonoses.

== History ==
Originally named the Veterinary Infectious Disease Organization, VIDO was established with funding from the Devonian Group of Charitable Foundations, the Province of Alberta and the Province of Saskatchewan. VIDO had strong ties to the Western College of Veterinary Medicine at the University of Saskatchewan. The laboratory took on its current name in March 2003. In October 2003, a 50,000 sq ft (5,000 m^{2}) expansion was completed.

In March 2004, VIDO received funding for the construction one of the world's largest and most advanced biosafety level 3 facilities, the International Vaccine Centre (InterVac), for research into emerging and reemerging human and animal diseases. The approximately CA$150 million in funding needed for infrastructure was provided by the Government of Canada, the Canada Foundation for Innovation, the Government of Saskatchewan, the University of Saskatchewan, and the City of Saskatoon.

InterVac finished construction in 2011 with a celebration that included then-prime minister Stephen Harper, Saskatchewan premier Brad Wall, and Saskatoon mayor Don Atchison. It received operational certification by the Public Health Agency of Canada and Canadian Food Inspection Agency in 2013. InterVac is one of the few level 3 facilities in the world capable of working with large animals including cattle, deer, elk, alpacas, sheep, and pigs.

VIDO was very involved in vaccine research during the COVID-19 pandemic, which raised their profile and helped them secure funding to develop into Canada's Centre for Pandemic Research. In 2021 they started to seek funding to develop level 4 safety facilities. As of March 2024, the facilities are expected to be ready as soon as next year, and will make VIDO the only non-government level 4 facility in the country.

The organization has had five directors since its inception. Chris Bigland was the founding director and ran the organization from 1975 to 1984. Its other directors have been Stephen Acres (1984–1993), Lorne Babiuk (1993–2007), Andrew Potter (2007–2018), and Volker Gerdts (2019–present).

VIDO has created three spin-off companies (Biostar, Biowest, and Star Biotech).

== COVID-19 research ==
During the COVID-19 pandemic, the Government of Saskatchewan has provided $4.2 million to VIDO. It also received $23 million in federal funding announced on March 23, 2020 for the centre's manufacturing facility to produce COVID-19 vaccines for clinical trials, and for overall operational costs.

== Vaccines ==
- Vicogen (cattle) – Prevention of calf scours
- Ecolan RC (cattle) – Prevention of bacterial and viral calf scours
- Hevlan TC (poultry) – Prevention of enteritis in turkeys
- Pneumo-Star (cattle) – Prevention of Pasteurella infection
- Somnu-Star (cattle) – Prevention of haemophilosis in cattle
- Somnu-Star Ph (cattle) – Prevention of pasteurellosis and haemophilosis in cattle
- Pleuro-Star 4 (swine) – Prevention of porcine pleuropneumonia
- Econiche (cattle) – Reduction of shedding of E. coli O157 to control human infection and environmental contamination

In 2020, VIDO began developing a vaccine for SARS-CoV-2 during the COVID-19 pandemic.

== See also ==
- PolyAnalytik
