= Harold E. Johns =

Canadian medical physicist (1915–1998)

- Born: 4 July 1915; Sichuan, China
- Died: 23 August 1998 (aged 83)
- Education: Degree in mathematics and physics Bachelor of Science
- Alma mater: McMaster University; University of Toronto
- Occupations: Medical physicist Master of Arts; Doctor of Philosophy

Harold Elford Johns OC (4 July 1915 – 23 August 1998) was a Canadian medical physicist, noted for his extensive contributions to the use of ionizing radiation to treat cancer.

== Early life and education ==
Johns was born to missionary parents in Sichuan, China. He lived in China until 1926, when political unrest there prompted his parents to return to North America. After spending time in Tacoma, Washington, and in Brandon, Manitoba, his family settled in Hamilton, Ontario.

In Hamilton, Johns pursued a degree in mathematics and physics at McMaster University, and he completed his Bachelor of Science degree (BSc) in 1936. He then moved to the University of Toronto, where he earned his Master of Arts and Doctor of Philosophy (PhD) degrees in physics in 1939.

== Early career ==
Johns' graduation coincided with the start of World War II. For the duration of the war, he taught physics, mathematics, radar systems, and radio navigation to newly recruited airplane pilots as part of the British Commonwealth Air Training Plan. Based on his radiography and physics experience, Johns was also involved in non-invasive X-ray testing of metal aircraft castings. A meeting in August 1946 with William Valentine Mayneord, while Mayneord was at the Atomic Energy Project at Chalk River, Ontario, contributed to Johns's making a career in medical physics.

Johns married Sybil Hawkins Johns in 1940. Their marriage lasted until Johns's death 58 years later.

== Development of cobalt-60 in medical treatment ==
After the close of the war, Johns was invited to work with Ertle Harrington at the University of Saskatchewan. It was there that he conducted his pioneering research in the use of cobalt-60 as a gamma ray source for the radiation therapy in cases of cancer.

Interest in nuclear technology burgeoned in post-war Canada. Nuclear research facilities constructed at the Chalk River Laboratories, Chalk River, Ontario near the end of the war were expanded and opened to civilian research projects. The first operational nuclear reactor outside the United States - the NRX - was located at Chalk River, and it provided a source of activated cobalt-60 for Johns's experiments.

Two groups - Johns's at the University of Saskatchewan, and another one in London, Ontario - designed and constructed external beam radiotherapy instruments using radioactive cobalt sources. The first treatment of a patient using the new source was carried out in London, Ontario, on 27 October 1951. In November 1951, the first Saskatoon patient, a 43-year-old mother of four, was treated for cervical cancer with a carefully calibrated dose of cobalt-60 radiation.

In early 1952, Maclean's magazine had dubbed the cobalt-source radiotherapy machine the cobalt bomb - a tongue-in-cheek tribute to this peaceful use of nuclear technology.

Johns's original treatment device was used in Saskatchewan until 1972.

== Ontario Cancer Institute ==
In 1956, Johns assumed the headship of the physics division of the Ontario Cancer Institute at Princess Margaret Hospital in Toronto.

To further scientific and medical collaborations between radiologists, radiotherapists, physicians, and physicists, Johns guided the creation of the Graduate Department in Medical Biophysics at the University of Toronto in 1958. Johns served as the second chair of the department, succeeding Arthur Ham in 1960.

Over the course of his career, Johns supervised 68 graduate students, published more than 200 peer-reviewed papers, and with John R. Cunningham, published the textbook "The Physics of Radiology".

== Awards ==
- Henry Marshall Tory Medal (1971)
- Officer of the Order of Canada (1978)
- Emeritus University Professor of the University of Toronto
- Canadian Medical Hall of Fame inductee (1998)
- Member of the Canadian Science and Engineering Hall of Fame
