= Henry Friesen =

Canadian endocrinologist (1934–2025)

Henry George Friesen
- Born: July 31, 1934; Morden, Manitoba, Canada
- Died: April 30, 2025 (aged 90); Winnipeg, Manitoba, Canada
- Education: University of Manitoba
- Known for: Discoverer of human prolactin
- Awards: Order of Canada; Order of Manitoba
- Scientific career
- Fields: Endocrinology
- Workplaces: McGill University; University of Manitoba

Henry George Friesen CC OM FRSC (July 31, 1934 – April 30, 2025) was a Canadian endocrinologist, a distinguished professor emeritus of the University of Manitoba and the discoverer of human prolactin, a hormone which stimulates lactation in mammary glands.

== Biography ==
Born in Morden, Manitoba, he obtained a Bachelor of Science in medicine and a medical degree from the University of Manitoba in 1958. From 1965 to 1973 he was at McGill University and from 1973 to 1992 he was a professor and head of the department of physiology and professor of medicine at the University of Manitoba.

Friesen was a recipient of the 1977 Canada Gairdner International Award "In recognition of his contributions to the understanding of the biochemistry, physiology and pathophysiology of lactogenic hormones and, in particular, for the identification of human prolactin."

His research on growth hormones in dwarf children helped in developing a therapy for the treatment of this problem. In addition his work with prolactin helped to develop the drug bromocriptine, used for the treatment of infertility.

From 1991 until 1999 he was president of the Medical Research Council of Canada and helped to transform it into the Canadian Institutes of Health Research. He was president of the National Cancer Institute of Canada and president of the Canadian Society for Clinical Investigation. He was the founding chair of Genome Canada.

Friesen died in Winnipeg on April 30, 2025, at the age of 90.

== Honours ==
- He was a recipient of the 1977 Canada Gairdner International Award.
- In 1978 he was made a Fellow of the Royal Society of Canada.
- He was named an Officer of the Order of Canada in 1987 and promoted to Companion in 2001.
- In 2001 he was inducted into the Canadian Medical Hall of Fame.
- In 2001 he was awarded the Gairdner Foundation Wightman Award.
- In 2004 he was awarded the Order of Manitoba.
- In 2006 he was awarded the Canadian Medical Association's F.N.G. Starr Award, described as the "Victoria Cross of Canadian Medicine", "for his exceptional devotion for the betterment of mankind which has made a difference in health care".
- He has received Honorary Doctorates from the University of Western Ontario, University of Manitoba, University of British Columbia, McGill University and McMaster University.

== Sources ==
- "Eleven Manitobans to receive Order of Manitoba". Lieutenant Governor of Manitoba. Archived from the original on February 28, 2006.
- "Dr. Henry G. Friesen CC OM". University of Manitoba. Archived from the original on May 14, 2011.
