= May Cohen =

Canadian physician and educator

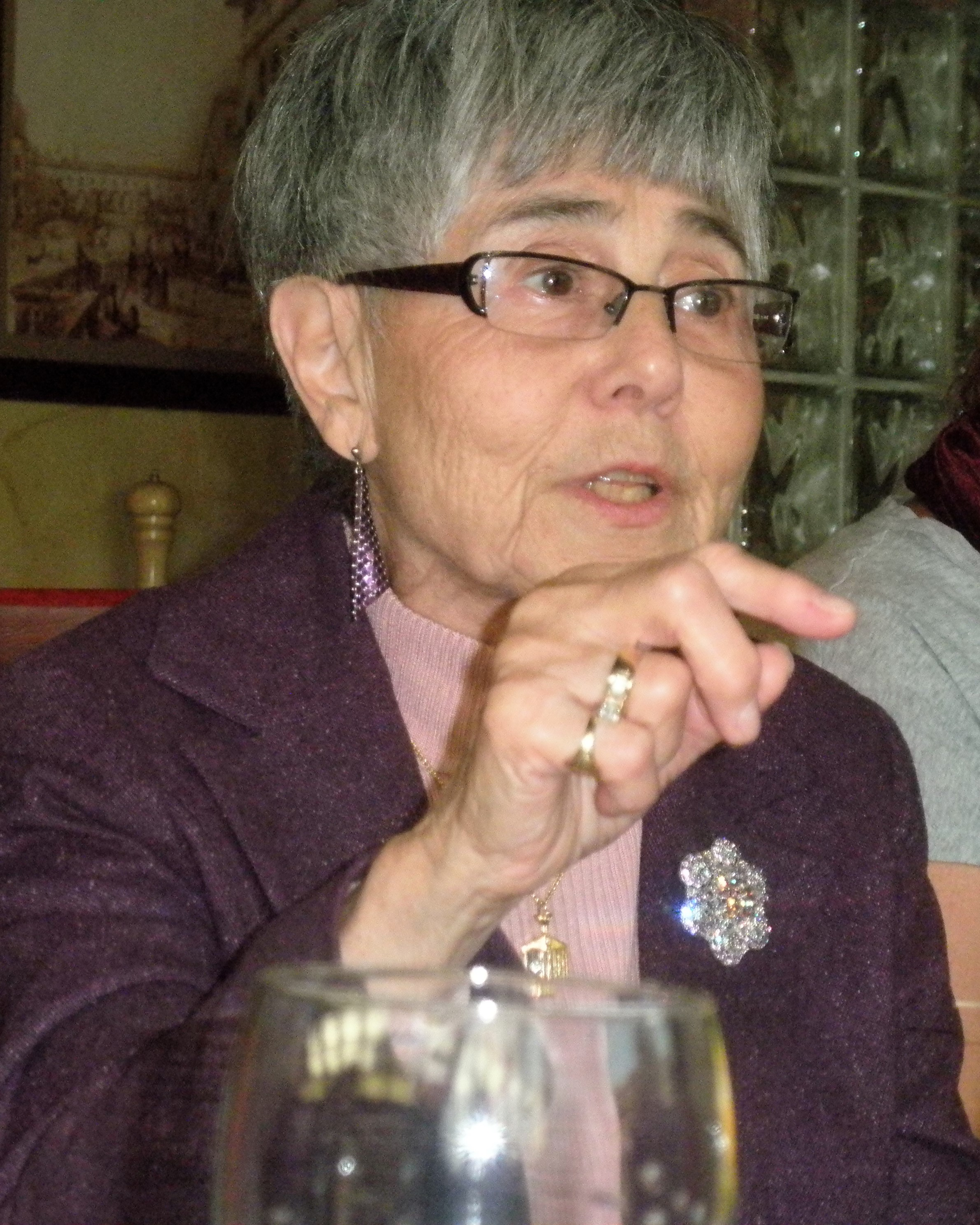
May Cohen in 2009

May Cohen, OC (born 1931) is a Canadian physician and educator. She is best known for initiating the creation of a women's health curriculum in Ontario medical schools and for her work as a women's health advocate.

== Early life and studies ==
May Cohen, née Lipshitz, was born on March 7, 1931, in Montreal, Quebec. She is the daughter of Sam and Manya Lipshitz. Her father, Sam, worked as the editor of a Jewish newspaper and her mother, Manya, taught Yiddish. Shortly after she was born, she and her family moved to Toronto, Ontario, where she was raised. She attended the Harbord Collegiate Institute and graduated as the top student in Ontario before attending medical school at the University of Toronto. She graduated from medical school in 1955 and was the recipient of a Cody Medal. After graduating, she received a Medical Research Council scholarship to study endocrinology for two years.

== Career ==
After finishing medical school, May Cohen went on to practice as a family physician in Toronto for 20 years. Then, in 1977, she began teaching and practicing family medicine at McMaster University in Hamilton, Ontario. In 1987, she went on sabbatical and travelled to Australia to focus on her work in the women's health field. When she returned, she became a part of a task force run by the Canadian Medical Association centered on reproductive technology. During this time, she was also a contributing member of the Women's Issues Committee at the Ontario Medical Association. She then helped to identify weaknesses in the curricula of every medical school in Ontario. The findings of the Women's Issues Committee sparked the creation of the Women's Health Office and the Gender Issues Committee at McMaster University. The Women's Health InterSchool Curriculum Committee, of which she was the co-founder, was also created due to the inadequacies discovered by the Women's Issues Committee. From 1990 to 1991, she served as the national president of the Federation of Medical Women of Canada. She was the Associate Dean of Health Services at McMaster University from 1991 to 1996. Beginning in 1991, she served as the founding chair of the Women's Health Office at McMaster University. She stepped down from this position following her retirement in 1998. She has several research publications relating to her work in the women's health field.

== Recognition ==
May Cohen was named a Canadian Medical Hall of Fame inductee in 2016 for her work in women's health. In 2017, she was named an Officer to the Order of Canada. In 2000, Eli Lilly Canada and McMaster University created the Eli Lilly Canada-May Cohen Chair in Women's Health in her honor, which included a one million dollar donation over five years from Eli Lilly Canada to be used for research in the field of women's health. Eli Lilly Canada and McMaster University also created the Eli Lilly Canada/May Cohen Chair in Women's Health in recognition of her work in the field.

There have also been several awards named in her honor, such as the May Cohen Award for Women Mentors, created by the Canadian Medical Association, and the May Cohen Leadership award, created by the Federation of Medical Women of Canada. Additionally, she has won several other awards. In 1986, she was named The City of Hamilton's Women of the Year. In 1995, she was a recipient of the Governor General's Award. She earned the Canadian Medical Association's Medal of Service in 2000, and in 2001, she was named an inductee to the Hamilton Gallery of Distinction.

== Personal life ==
In 1952, May Cohen married Dr. Gerry Cohen, who also graduated from the University of Toronto in 1955 and became a family practitioner. Dr. Gerry Cohen joined the McMaster University Department of Family Medicine with his wife in 1977. The couple has three children: Eric, Russel, and the late Stuart. They also have seven grandchildren.
