= William Gallie =

Canadian surgeon (1882–1959)

William Edward Gallie (January 29, 1882 – September 25, 1959) was a Canadian medical educator and orthopedic surgeon.

He was born in Barrie, Ontario, studied medicine at the University of Toronto and interned at The Hospital for Sick Children and the Toronto General Hospital. Gallie spent one year at the Hospital for the Ruptured and Crippled in New York City in 1905. He returned to Toronto the following year and joined the Hospital for Sick Children as an orthopaedic surgeon. From 1907 to 1910, he worked as a junior surgeon at Toronto General before returning to the Hospital for Sick Children. In 1921, he became chief surgeon at the Hospital for Sick Children and, in 1928, became a professor of surgery and chief surgeon at Toronto General. He established a training course for residents in surgery that would qualify them to take examinations with the Royal College of Physicians and Surgeons of Canada. He was dean of the University of Toronto Faculty of Medicine from 1936 to 1946. In 1941, he was named president of the American College of Surgeons. He retired from general surgery in 1947. In 1951, he convinced Samuel McLaughlin to create a foundation that would fund post-graduate studies for potential teachers for Canadian medical schools.

Gallie died of squamous-cell carcinoma at the age of 77.

He was named to the Canadian Medical Hall of Fame in 2001.
