= John Bienenstock =

Hungarian-born Canadian doctor (1936–2022)

John Bienenstock CM FRSC (October 6, 1936 – July 25, 2022) was a Hungarian-born Canadian doctor. He is considered one of the fathers of mucosal immunology.

Born in Budapest, of Jewish parents, he escaped to England in 1939 with his parents. He was educated at St Paul's School in London and studied medicine at Kings London and Westminster Hospital medical school graduating with his MBBS degree in 1960. Bienenstock came to the United States to pursue research projects at Harvard University but left for Canada during the Vietnam War rather than be drafted as an army doctor. He joined McMaster University in 1968. He served as dean of Health Sciences, as vice-president of the Faculty of Health Sciences and as chair for the Department of Pathology and Molecular Medicine at McMaster. He has also served as president of the Canadian Society for Immunology and of the Society of Mucosal Immunology. More recently, he became head of the Brain-Body Institute at St. Joseph's Healthcare Hamilton.

Bienenstock introduced the concept of a common mucosal immune system. He also studied the interactions between the nervous and immune systems.

Bienenstock was a member of the Royal College of Physicians (UK). Bienenstock was named a fellow of the Royal Society of Canada in 1992 and was named to the Order of Canada in 2002. Bienenstock was inducted into the Canadian Medical Hall of Fame in 2011. He died on July 25, 2022, at the age of 85.
