= Michel G. Bergeron =

Canadian physician

Michel G. Bergeron OC OQ (born November 25, 1943, in Quebec) is a Canadian physician. He is the founder and director of the Infectious Disease Research Center at Laval University. He was invested as an Officer of the National Order of Quebec in 2008, invested as a Member of the Order of Canada in 2010, and inducted into the Canadian Medical Hall of Fame in 2017.
