= Elizabeth Eisenhauer =

Canadian oncologist

Elizabeth Eisenhauer is a Canadian oncologist who has spent a large portion of her career undertaking phase I and II trials of novel cancer therapies through her role as Director of the Investigational New Drug Program in the Canadian Cancer Trials Group. She received her Doctor of Medicine degree from Queen's University and was trained in internal medicine and hematology, obtaining fellowships from the Royal College of Physicians and Surgeons of Canada.

Eisenhauer is an emerita professor in the Department of Oncology at Queen's University, and was Department Head from 2012 to 2017. She has served on the board of the American Society of Clinical Oncology, National Cancer Institute of Canada (as its president), the European Organization for Research and Treatment of Cancer, and the Canadian Cancer Society.

In 2012, she was awarded with the Queen Elizabeth II Diamond Jubilee medal for “her tremendous commitment to the advancement of cancer therapy, supportive care and prevention across Canada and internationally.” In 2015 she was elected as a fellow of the Royal Society of Canada and in 2017, she was inducted as an Officer of the Order of Canada. In 2021 she was awarded the Canada Gairdner Wightman Award.
