= Compendium of Pharmaceuticals and Specialties =

Pharmacy reference book

CPS: Drug Information
- Author: Canadian Pharmacists Association
- Language: English / French
- Publication place: Canada
- Media type: Print / Online / Mobile

The Compendium of Pharmaceuticals and Specialties: The Canadian Drug Reference for Health Professionals, more commonly known by its abbreviation CPS, is a reference book that contains drug monographs and numerous features which help healthcare professionals prescribe and use drugs safely and appropriately. A print version of CPS is released annually by the Canadian Pharmacists Association (CPhA). The CPhA is a nonprofit organization that advocates for pharmacists in Canada. An external Editorial Advisory Committee of Canadian physicians and pharmacists advises CPhA about the strategic direction of their publications including CPS. CPS is also available online by subscription at www.pharmacists.ca. Most of the drug monographs in CPS are provided by manufacturers, though numerous monographs—usually for drugs which are available as generic brands— are written by CPhA editorial staff and peer reviewed. 2010 marked the 50th anniversary of the first edition of CPS.

== CPS Content ==
The following sections appear in CPS.

=== Brand and Generic Name Index ===
The Brand and Generic Name Index is located at the front of CPS. It is the most comprehensive list of current brand and generic drugs in Canada, and also includes discontinued products. This section is also referred to as the green section because of the green border on the right side of the pages.

=== Therapeutic Guide ===
The Therapeutic Guide is located near the front of CPS. These pages offer uses or indications and the drugs available to treat that indication. The Therapeutic Guide is also referred to as the pink section because of the pink border on the right side of the pages.

=== Product Identification ===
The Product Identification section includes photos and illustrations of numerous drugs in pill, tablet, caplet, capsule, syrup, and other forms. These illustrations and professional photos are included if manufacturers wish to participate in this service.

=== Clin-Info ===
The Clin-Info section is located at the front of CPS. Clin-Info provides clinically useful equations, principles of prescribing in pregnancy, drug and food administration, immunization schedules, and other quick reference information for healthcare professionals to safely and effectively use drugs. The Clin-Info section is also referred to as the lilac section because of the lilac border on the right side of the pages.

=== Directory ===
The Directory includes contact information for poison control centres, health organizations, and pharmaceutical manufacturers.

=== Monographs ===
There are two types of monographs that appear in CPS.

==== Product Monographs ====
The bulk of CPS consists of monographs that are provided by pharmaceutical manufacturers. These monographs are written and owned by the manufacturers and are approved by Health Canada. CPhA formats the monographs for publication but does not change the content of these monographs in any way. The section of the book that contains monographs is also referred to as the white section because of the lack of any coloured border on the right side of the pages. Monographs appear alphabetically by brand name.

==== CPhA Monographs ====
Amongst the manufacturer-supplied monographs in CPS are numerous monographs—200 in 2014— compiled by editorial staff at CPhA. These CPhA monographs are peer reviewed by Canadian experts, provide the best available evidence and accumulated clinical information about the drug or drug class. In addition, each CPhA monograph contains a section on pregnancy and breastfeeding. CPhA monographs are indexed at the front of CPS and easily identified—the titles are shaded in grey— throughout CPS.

=== Information for the Patient ===
Information for the Patient provides helpful advice and how-to information for patients on many drugs. This is Part III of the Health Canada approved product monograph and reflects the content of Part I, but is written in lay language that is easier for patients to understand. This section is only available in e-CPS.

=== Drug Updates ===
Drug updates about new molecular entities, new products, new indications, and new safety information are published in e-CPS and are also available at www.pharmacists.ca under the "products" tab. All updates appear in the subsequent print edition of CPS.

=== Appendices ===
The Appendices contain Health Canada drug regulatory and monitoring programs' reporting and request forms on such topics as Narcotic and Controlled Drugs, Benzodiazepines and Other Targeted Substances, and Adverse Events Following Immunization: Surveillance and Reporting.

=== Glossaries ===
A number of helpful glossaries appear near the end of CPS including Medical Abbreviations, and Latin Prescription Terms.

== Other Information about CPS ==
The following sections include other information about CPS.

=== CPS Online ===
All the information that appears in the CPS print edition is also available to subscribers at https://cps.pharmacists.ca/. The information in CPS is updated every week or more frequently depending on the urgency of the information. Health Canada alerts are also added to the drug monographs in CPS when they are issued. Includes Lexi-Interact drug interaction checker.

=== Physical Description ===
The print version of CPS has a blue cover and perfect binding. The English edition is published as a two volume set. The page size is 9" 3/8 x 11" 7/8 and the font size is 6.5.

=== Release Date ===
The English version of CPS is released in January every year, and the French version is released in February every year.

=== History ===
2010 marked the 50th anniversary of the first publication of CPS (although not the 50th edition—there were some years in which CPS was not published). CPS has been published annually since 1967. There have been numerous changes and additions to CPS over the years including the first French edition in 1968, a move from hard-cover to soft-cover in 1981, and the introduction of e-CPS in 2004. With each passing year there are more drug monographs and information in CPS, which has resulted in a steadily increasing volume size. Sales have continued to grow as CPS remains the most comprehensive and frequently used reference for safely and accurately prescribing drugs in Canada.

== Criticisms ==
In the past, the CPS has been criticized for being heavily influenced by the pharmaceutical industry and for lacking important information, such as efficacy and price. Pharmaceuticals in the CPS are listed by their brand name, as opposed to by the International Nonproprietary Name (INN) or United States Adopted Name (USAN).

Some have called for the creation of an independent, nonprofit organization to manage the CPS.
