= University of Alberta Faculty of Pharmacy and Pharmaceutical Sciences =

Faculty of Pharmacy and Pharmaceutical Sciences
- Type: Faculty
- Dean: Neal Davies
- Students: 569 undergraduate and graduate
- Location: Edmonton, Alberta, Canada; 53.5224°N 113.5246°W
- Website: ualberta.ca/pharmacy

The University of Alberta Faculty of Pharmacy and Pharmaceutical Sciences, is located in Edmonton, Alberta, Canada. It offers undergraduate and graduate degrees in pharmacy.

== Background ==
The faculty began in 1913 as a department within the Faculty of Medicine, and then as a school after 1917. The first three students to graduate from the school did so in 1921, and they thus became the first students in the British Empire to complete a four-year (instead of three-year) pharmacy program.

In 1955, the school became the Faculty of Pharmacy, graduating its first PhD student in 1961. In 1968, it was renamed the Faculty of Pharmacy and Pharmaceutical Sciences. Its first dean, from its creation in 1955 until his retirement in 1978, was Mervyn Huston.

The admissions process is selective for those seeking a Bachelor of Science (BSc) in Pharmacy. The undergraduate program has had a duration of four years, including a professional year in the field. The Faculty also offers MPharm, MSc, and PhD graduate programs.

Since 2013, the faculty also began offering a 2-year post graduate PharmD (Doctor of Pharmacy) program for Practising Pharmacists who have already graduated with a Bachelor of Science in Pharmacy.

In the Fall of 2018, the University of Alberta (Edmonton, Alberta) replaced their four-year BSc. Pharm program with an entry to practise PharmD. program, with the first graduating class expected in April 2022. However, since the spring of 2017 the university has offered current BSc. Pharm students the ability to bridge to the PharmD. program. This requires the students to take two extra summer semesters between their third and fourth years, as well as an extra 16 weeks of clinical rotations during their fourth year. Only students graduating between 2018 and 2021 will have had this option. As a result, currently the university is offering 3 possible means to obtain a PharmD degree. That is the 2 year PharmD program for practising pharmacists, those in the PharmD for BSc. Pharm students (PBS), and those in the entry to practise PharmD program. BSc. Pharm students who did not enrol in the PBS program between 2018 and 2021 will be the final students to graduate with a bachelor's degree from the faculty.

The school is located in the Medical Sciences Building at North Campus, in Edmonton, Alberta, Canada.

== Academic reputation ==
Students of the Faculty place first in Canada in the National Pharmacy Examining Board of Canada examinations 18 of the past 20 years. In 12 of those years the individual award for the highest achievement in these examinations in all of Canada came from the faculty (as of 2010). The school is known to admit and produce some of the highest quality pharmacists in Canada, as evidenced by their overall, as well as individual achievement in the National Pharmacy Examining Board of Canada Examinations, of which all Pharmacy students in Canada write.
