= John McEachern =

John Sinclair McEachern (April 16, 1872 – December 12, 1947) was a Canadian physician.

He was born in Stayner, Ontario and was educated in medicine at the University of Toronto. McEachern moved to Calgary in 1904 and opened the McEachern clinic there. He became president of the Alberta Medical Association in 1908. McEachern is credited from saving the Canadian Medical Association (CMA) from financial ruin in 1921, persuading provincial medical associations to merge with the CMA and helping develop the CMA's Plan for Health Insurance in Canada during the 1930s which contributed to the development of a national health care plan in Canada. He served as president of the CMA from 1934 to 1935. From 1938 to 1944, he was founding president of the Canadian Society for the Control of Cancer, later the Canadian Cancer Society.

He was named to the Canadian Medical Hall of Fame in 2006.

The McEachern Cancer Research Laboratory, later the University of Alberta Cancer Research Group, was named in his honour.
