= F. Estelle R. Simons =

Canadian physician and researcher

Frances Estelle Reed Simons OC FRSC (April 26, 1945 – November 5, 2025) was a Canadian physician and researcher. She was named to the Canadian Medical Hall of Fame in 2017.

She was born in Vancouver, British Columbia and grew up there. Simons received her BSc and MD from the University of Manitoba. She studied pediatrics and immunology at the University of Washington. In 1975, she founded the Allergy and Clinical Immunology section in the Pediatrics department at the University of Manitoba and served as its section head from 1975 to 2005. From 1976 to 1991, she was training program director for Allergy and Clinical Immunology. She was one of the first pediatric clinical scientists in Canada.

Simons was a professor in the departments of Pediatrics and Child Health and of Immunology at the University of Manitoba. She was internationally recognized for her research into the management of allergic diseases. She designed and implemented testing of new medications to treat conditions such as asthma, allergic rhinitis and hives.

She was a fellow of the Royal Society of Canada, of the Royal College of Physicians and Surgeons of Canada and of the Canadian Academy of Health Sciences. She held the Medical Council of Canada's Queen Elizabeth II Scientist Award from 1975 to 1981. She served on the editorial boards for five biomedical journals including The Journal of Allergy and Clinical Immunology. She had been chair of the Clinical Immunology Specialty Committee of the Royal College of Physicians and Surgeons of Canada and president of both the Canadian Society of Allergy and Clinical Immunology and the American Academy of Allergy, Asthma, and Immunology. She was awarded the Canadian Medical Association's Medal of Service in 1999.

The F. Estelle R. Simons Award for Research was established in her name in 2016 by the Canadian Society of Allergy and Clinical Immunology to recognize outstanding research in the fields of allergy, asthma and immunology.

She was appointed to the Order of Canada in 2024.
