= Ian Rusted =

Canadian physician (1921–2007)

Ian Edwin Lawman Hollands Rusted OC (July 12, 1921 – July 14, 2007) was a Canadian doctor in Newfoundland and Labrador.

The son of Reverend Canon Ernest E. Rusted and Faith Hollands Rusted, he was born in Upper Island Cove, Newfoundland and attended school in Carbonear and St. John's. Rusted earned a pre-med degree from Memorial University College in 1940 and continued his studies at Trinity College, Toronto and Dalhousie University. He interned at Victoria General Hospital in Halifax and went on to earn a BSc from McGill University in 1949. He was awarded a fellowship in medicine by the Mayo Foundation and continued post-graduate studies at the Mayo Clinic from 1949 to 1952. In 1952, he became a fellow in the Royal College of Physicians of Canada. Later that year, he returned to Newfoundland, where he specialized in internal medicine. From 1952 to 1967, he served as medical consultant to the Newfoundland Department of Health. He was director of Medical Education, director of the Memorial University Research Unit and chairman of the Department of Medicine at St. John's General Hospital, also practising privately.

Rusted was able to persuade the federal and provincial governments to create a faculty of Medicine at Memorial University in 1967 and he served as its first dean and as professor of medicine. He stepped down as dean in 1974, when he was named vice-president of Health Sciences. He retired from that position in 1988.

In 1949, Rusted married Ellen Marie Hansen and they had two sons.

He was named an Officer in the Order of Canada in 1985. In 2013, he was inducted into the Canadian Medical Hall of Fame.

His older brother Nigel was also a physician.
