= Deborah J. Cook =

Canadian medical scientist (born 1960)

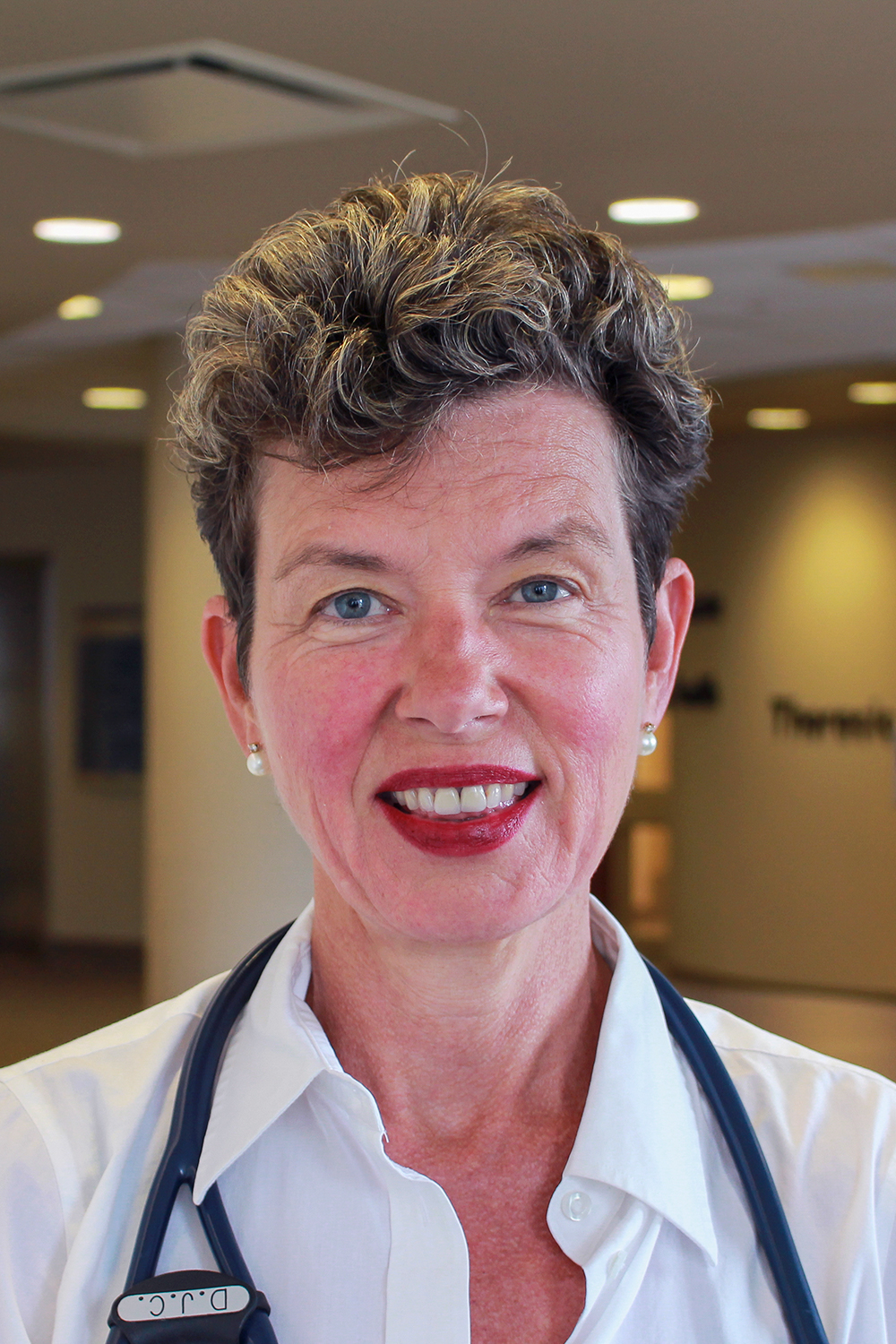
- Born: October 5, 1960 (age 66); Dundas, Ontario, Canada
- Awards: Canadian Medical Hall of Fame Inductee (2025) Royal Society of Canada McLaughlin Medal (2024) Gairdner Foundation Canada Gairdner Wightman Award (2022) Society of Critical Care Medicine Lifetime Achievement Award (2021) CIHR Gold Leaf Prize (2018)

Academic background
- Education: McMaster University (MD & MSc)

Deborah J. Cook (born October 5, 1960) FRSC OC is a Canadian critical care physician. She is a Canada Research Chair of Research Transfer in Intensive Care at McMaster University and a Fellow of the Royal Society of Canada.

== Early life and education ==
Cook was born on October 5, 1960 in Dundas, Ontario. She completed her undergraduate medical degree and internal medicine training at McMaster University, then pursued an advanced fellowship in critical care medicine at Stanford University. She returned to McMaster to complete her Master's degree in design, measurement, and evaluation, before joining the faculty in 1990.

== Career ==
In 1989 Dr. Cook was a founding member of the first successful critical care research collaboration in the world – the Canadian Critical Care Trials Group. By the turn of the 21st century, Cook began serving as a professor in the Departments of Medicine, Clinical Epidemiology & Biostatistics, and co-chair of the CLARITY Research Group at McMaster. The following year, she was also the recipient of the inaugural Ministry of Training, Colleges and Universities Leadership in Faculty Teaching Award. Throughout her early tenure at McMaster, Cook focused her research on the prevention and management of deep venous thrombosis and pneumonia among critically ill patients. As a result, she was elected a Fellow of the Royal Society of Canada in 2009.

In 2013, Cook began the 3 Wishes Project which aims to "bring peace to the final days of a patient's life and to ease the grieving process." Within its first three years of implementation, the 3 Wishes Project enacted 630 wishes with an average cost of $20. Some wishes included a rock-and-roll singalong with their friends, bagpipes to be played at the moment of death, and lying in bed with their son. She was subsequently hailed as a world-leading expert in intensive care medicine and named a Member of the Order of Canada. Cook was also recognized by McMaster with the promotion to Distinguished University Professor and received the 2015 Elizabeth J. Latimer Prize in Palliative Care for "excellence and innovation in palliative care." In 2016, she became an Officer of the Order of Canada for her international contributions to improving the care of critically ill patients.

During the COVID-19 pandemic, Cook was selected for two task forces on controlling COVID-19. She served on the multidisciplinary COVID-19 Expert Panel which was created to advise Mona Nemer on the latest scientific developments related to the disease. She was also a member of the task force on reprocessing of N95 masks or respirators.

== Awards ==
In 2018, she received the Canadian Institutes of Health Research Gold Leaf Prize for her impact on improving clinical treatments for patients who are either fighting critical illnesses or facing end-of-life situations in the intensive care unit (ICU). In 2020, she received the Canada Gairdner Wightman Award for her multi-method multi-disciplinary research on advanced life support, prevention of ICU-acquired complications, research ethics and end-of-life care. During the covid pandemic, Cook was awarded the Lifetime Achievement Award from the Society of Critical Care Medicine for her contribution in improving and reprocessing N95 masks or respirators. In 2024, she was awarded the McLaughlin Medal by the Royal Society of Canada. Cook's research has made high-impact, practice-changing scientific contributions that improve the care of critically ill patients worldwide.

In June 2025, Dr. Cook was inducted into the Canadian Medical Hall of Fame, lauded as "a pioneering researcher in critical care medicine".
