= Max Cynader =

Canadian neuroscientist

- Born: 24 February 1947 (age 79); Berlin, Germany
- Education: McGill University; MIT
- Awards: Order of Canada; Order of British Columbia
- Scientific career
- Fields: Ophthalmology, Neuroscience
- Workplaces: Dalhousie University; University of British Columbia

Max Sigmund Cynader CM, OBC, Ph.D, FRSC, FCAHS (born 24 February 1947) is a Canadian neuroscientist. He is the founding director of the Brain Research Centre and the Djavad Mowafaghian Centre for Brain Health at the University of British Columbia.

OBC ribbon

Born in Berlin in a displaced persons camp, the son of Polish Jews who escaped Poland before the Nazi invasion of Poland, Cynader emigrated to Canada in 1951. He received a Bachelor of Science degree from McGill University in 1967 and a Ph.D. from MIT in 1972. He did postdoctoral training at the Max Planck Institute in Germany before joining the Faculty in the departments of psychology and physiology at Dalhousie University. In 1988, he became head of the Ophthalmology Research Group at the University of British Columbia, and was appointed Director of the Brain Research Centre in 1998. Cynader's early research focused on the visual system and its postnatal development. He published influential papers on the mechanisms by which normal and abnormal visual experience affected the development of the visual cortex. In one paper, he showed that rearing kittens in stroboscopic illumination such that the visual system was exposed to a series of stationary images 8 times per second resulted in the development of visual cortex neurons which lacked the direction selectivity that characterised the cortex of normally reared animals. No effects were found in adult animals who were treated in the same way, illustrating the importance visual experience during early postnatal life in sculpting the visual system. In related work, he showed that there were well-defined postnatal critical periods during which the ocular preferences of cortical neurons could be modified by visual experience, and that these critical periods could be themselves be prolonged, apparently indefinitely, by rearing animals in the dark before the ocular dominance modifying procedures were undertaken. He further investigated the molecular mechanisms that underpinned the plasticity of the visual system, publishing papers on changes in gene expression, and receptor redistribution in the cortex associated with the critical period. In subsequent work, his interests broadened to include auditory processing mechanisms, the determinants of healthy brain aging, and the molecular mechanisms underlying neurodegenerative disorders.

Entrepreneurial Activity

Cynader has contributed to technology development, and to the commercialization of research results. In addition to his many published papers, Cynader holds over a dozen patents. In 1992, he cofounded NeuroVir, a Vancouver-based biotechnology company which developed gene therapy products to treat brain diseases. This company, which grew to over 60 employees, was eventually sold to a German biotechnology company, which then took the NeuroVir technology into clinical trials. In 1993, he cofounded Wavemakers Research, a software company which developed proprietary noise reducing technology, modelled on the processing mechanisms of the auditory cortex. This technology was commercially successful, and went into widespread use in over 20% of the world car market. More recently, he co-founded two start-ups: a biotech called Primary Peptides (www.primarypeptides.com) whose lead compound is in clinical trials in stroke and a consumer Brain Health company called Synaptitude(www.Synaptitudebrainhealth.com).

Academic leadership and Public Engagement.

After his appointment as Director of the Brain Research Centre, Cynader set about improving its profile, stature, and finances. A gifted communicator, who had received several excellence in teaching awards, he became a spokesperson for Brain Research at both the local and National level. He appeared on many television and radio shows, and made numerous presentations to lay groups such as the Rotary Club, Probis, Avocis, and various seniors groups. He emphasized the importance of modern Brain Research in developing new treatments for the many prevalent Neurological and Psychiatric diseases that impact society. He also served as a spokesperson for the Alzheimer's Society, the Heart and Stroke Foundation, Literacy BC, sat on the Board of Brain Canada and acted for various Public and private funding agencies. A prolific fundraiser, he leveraged private donations, and Federal and Provincial support to build the Djavad Mowafaghian Centre for Brain Health on the UBC campus. When this facility opened in 2014, it brought together Clinical and fundamental neuroscience in a state-of-the-art 160,000 sq. ft. facility which remains one of Canada's leading Neuroscience enterprises.

Personal Life

Cynader is married, to Ann Lynn Langford (Tondow), and has three daughters. In his free time he enjoys tennis, photography, and his succulent collection.

== Honours ==
- 1987 – Fellow of the Royal Society of Canada
- 2007 – Member of the Order of British Columbia.
- 2008 – Member of the Order of Canada
- 2012 – Queen Elizabeth II Diamond Jubilee Medal.
- 2014 – Inducted into the Canadian Medical Hall of Fame.
