= Antoine Hakim =

Canadian engineer and physician (born 1942)

Antoine M. Hakim OC (born April 30, 1942) is a Canadian engineer and physician.

He first trained as a chemical engineer and worked for Syncrude in Alberta. Wishing to change careers, Hakim taught school for a short time in Montreal. He then earned a PhD in Biomedical Engineering from Rensselaer Polytechnic Institute in New York and went on to study medicine at Albany Medical College. He completed his residency at the Montreal Neurological Institute and later became a professor at McGill University. In 1992, he became chair of the Neurology department and director of the Neuroscience Research Institute at the University of Ottawa. From 1992 to 2000, he was head of the Neurology division at The Ottawa Hospital.

When Hakim began his research, strokes were widely regarded as unpreventable and available treatments were limited. By gaining a better understanding of the process of a stroke and the nature of the damage to the brain, he was able to identify possible treatments and, later, how to reduce the likelihood of strokes.

Hakim helped create the Canadian Stroke Network and served as its CEO and scientific director. From 2001 to 2008, he was the founding scientific director of the Heart and Stroke Foundation Centre for Stroke Recovery.

In 2007, he was named an Officer in the Order of Canada. In 2013, he was inducted into the Canadian Medical Hall of Fame. In 2017, he was selected for the prestigious Canada Gairdner Wightman Award for his outstanding research into strokes and their consequences and championing stroke prevention and treatment in Canada and beyond.

Hakim has written the book Save your mind: seven rules to avoid dementia in 2017 (ISBN 1988025214), which is also available in French "Préservez votre vitalité mentale: 7 règles pour prévenir la démence".
