= Henri Breault =

Canadian physician (1909–1983)

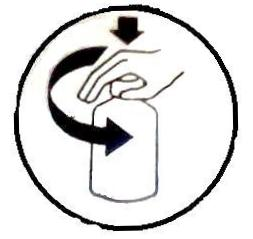
Breault's "Palm N Turn" design for childproof containers

Henri J. Breault /ˈhɛnri ˈbroʊ/ (4 March 1909 – 9 October 1983) was a Canadian medical doctor and medical researcher who was instrumental in the creation of the first child-proof container.

Born in Tecumseh, Ontario, Breault graduated from the University of Western Ontario in 1936 with his medical degree, and practiced medicine in Windsor, Ontario for over 40 years. As Chief of Pediatrics and Director of the Poison Control Centre at Hotel Dieu Hospital beginning in 1957, where he helped develop the child-safety cap. His Ontario Association for the Control of Accidental Poisoning, established in 1962, enabled the 1967 adoption of a cap design known as the "Palm N Turn", which was endorsed by the Ontario College of Pharmacy. The incidence of poisoning by accidental medicine ingestion, which had previous been over 1000 per year, dropped by 91 percent. Ontario was the first province to make child-proof lids mandatory for medicine bottles in 1974, and other provinces did the same shortly thereafter.

Breault died in 1983. The Hotel Dieu Hospital established a pediatrics centre named after him to recognize his contributions to medicine. He was inducted into the Canadian Medical Hall of Fame in 1997.
