= Mervyn Huston =

Canadian pharmacologist and humorist

Mervyn J. Huston (1912 – March 7, 2001) was a Canadian pharmacologist and humourist. A longtime professor and academic dean at the University of Alberta's school of pharmacy, he was best known for his humour novel Gophers Don't Pay Taxes, which won the Stephen Leacock Memorial Medal for Humour in 1982.

Originally from Ashcroft, British Columbia, Huston worked in his father's pharmacy as a teenager before studying pharmacology at the University of Alberta and the University of Washington. Huston earned his Bachelor of Pharmaceutical Sciences degree at the University of Alberta in 1937 and his master's degree four years later while lecturing in the University of Alberta's School of Pharmacy. He became director of the pharmacy program at the University of Alberta's Faculty of Medicine in 1946, and dean of the expanded Faculty of Pharmacy and Pharmaceutical Sciences in 1955. He held the latter role until his retirement in 1978, and served as an associate editor of the Canadian Pharmacists Journal.

His other humour works included Canada Eh to Zed, Great Golf Humour, Toast to the Bride, Prescription for Humour, Golf and Murphy's Law and The Great Canadian Lover. He was also a musician, playing saxophone in a jazz music band in his youth and later playing bassoon with the Edmonton Symphony Orchestra.

He died in 2001.
