= Gustave Gingras =

Canadian physician

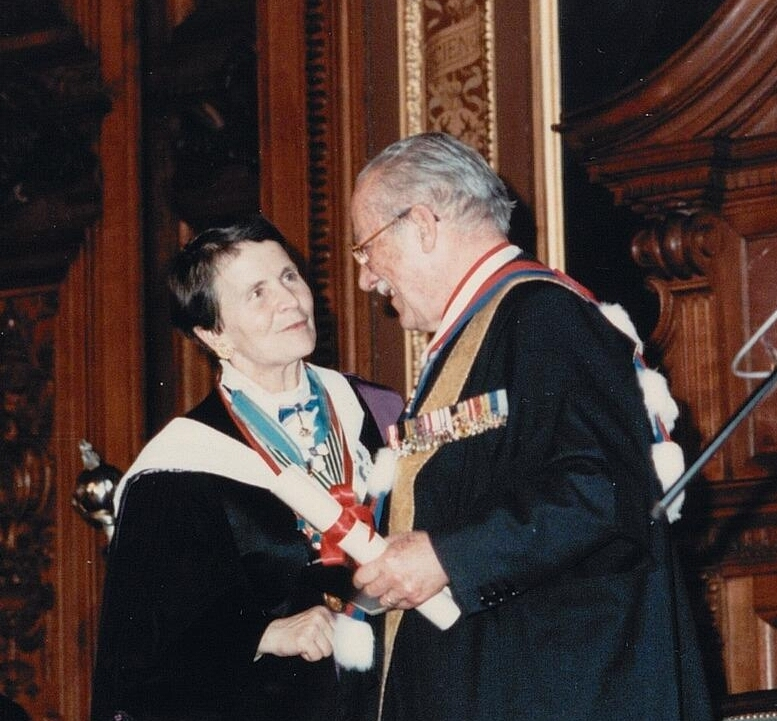
- Gustave Gingras in 1988
- Born: January 18, 1918; Montreal, Quebec, Canada
- Died: May 9, 1996 (aged 78); Prince Edward Island, Canada
- Education: Université de Montréal
- Occupation: physician
- Awards: Order of Canada

Gustave Gingras
- Crest: A strand of maple erect Gules and in saltire a palm branch and a laurel branch proper all entwined by a serpent Vert.
- Shield: Quarterly Vert and barry undy Argent and Azure two flaunches per fess counterchanged of the field over all a cross formy the finials alternating gringolee and floretty all Or.
- Motto: Je Sers (I Serve)

Gustave Gingras CC (January 18, 1918 – May 9, 1996) was a Canadian physician and founder of the Montreal Institute of Rehabilitation in 1949.

Born in Montreal, Quebec, he studied medicine at the Université de Montréal following the completion of his BA at College Bourget in Rigaud, Quebec. In 1942, he joined the Royal Canadian Army Medical Corps and served overseas during World War II. There, he studied neurosurgery as an intern at the Canadian Neurosurgical and Plastic Surgery Hospital in Basingstoke, England. Upon his return to Canada, he was inspired by Wilder Penfield, a neurosurgeon in Montreal, to focus on helping paraplegic and quadriplegic veterans of the war. As an expert in rehabilitation of disabled people, he served as a consultant to the World Health Organization, the United Nations, the Canadian Red Cross and the Canadian International Development Agency. He was president of the Canadian Medical Association from 1972 to 1973. He was Chancellor of the University of Prince Edward Island from 1974 to 1982.

== Honours ==
- In 1967, he received an honorary doctorate from Sir George Williams University, which later became Concordia University.
- In 1967, he was made an Officer of the Order of Canada.
- In 1972, he was promoted to Companion of the Order of Canada.
- In 1998, he was inducted into the Canadian Medical Hall of Fame.
- Knight of the Venerable Order of Saint John.

== Books ==
- Gustave Gingras: Combats pour la Survie. Paris: Robert Laffont / Opera mundi, 1975.
- Gustave Gingras: Feet Was I to the Lame. Translated by Joan Chapman. London: Souvenir Press, 1977.
