= Canadian Journal of Surgery =

Canadian Journal of Surgery/Journal canadien de chirurgie
- Discipline: Surgery
- Language: English, French
- Edited by: Edward J. Harvey, Chad Ball

Publication details
- History: 1957-present
- Publisher: Canadian Medical Association (Canada)
- Frequency: Bimonthly
- Impact factor: 2.544 (2017)

Standard abbreviations
- ISO 4: Can. J. Surg.

Indexing
- ISSN: 1488-2310 (print); 1488-2310 (web)
- OCLC no.: 45048853

Links
- Journal homepage; Online archive; PubMed Central Can J Surg

The Canadian Journal of Surgery is a bimonthly peer-reviewed open access medical journal covering surgery. It was established in 1957 and is published by the Canadian Medical Association. The current editors-in-chief are Edward J. Harvey and Chad Ball. The journal is sponsored by the Canadian Association of General Surgeons, Canadian Society for Vascular Surgery, Canadian Association of Thoracic Surgeons, and Canadian Society of Surgical Oncology.

== History ==
The journal was established as a result of a collaboration between Canadian departments of surgery, the Royal College of Physicians and Surgeons of Canada, and the Canadian Medical Association. In 1957, leading surgical groups asked the Canadian Medical Association to undertake the publishing of the journal. The founding editorial board consisted of the chairs of surgery at the 12 medical schools in Canada at the time. The president of the Royal College of Physicians and Surgeons of Canada chaired the board. The first issue was published on 1 October 1957. The Royal College of Physicians and Surgeons of Canada subsidized the journal until 1991 when it withdrew in favor of its own journal, Annals of the Royal College of Physicians and Surgeons of Canada. Jean Couture then arranged for the Canadian Association of General Surgeons to become the major sponsor of the journal. Currently the Canadian Journal of Surgery, at 60 years of continuous publication, is the longest surviving journal of record of surgery in 300 years of organised surgery in Canada.

== Citation record ==
Journal Citation Reports shows that as of the end of 2016, the Canadian Journal of Surgery had published 5917 citable articles. The average citation per article was 6.9 so that its Impact Factor increased yearly from 0.5 in 2006 to 2.544 in 2017. The journal's h-index is 55 with a normalized Eigenfactor score of 0.42.

== Editors-in-chief ==
The following persons are or have been editor-in-chief of the journal:

- Robert M. Janes, 1957–1964
- Frederick G. Kergin, 1964–1972
- Lloyd D. MacLean, 1972–1992
- C. Barber Mueller, 1972–1992
- Roger G. Keith, 1992–1998
- Jonathan Larmonth Meakins, 1992–2003
- James P. Waddell, 1998–2011
- Garth L. Warnock, 2003–2013
- Edward Harvey, 2011–present
- Vivian C McAlister, 2013–2019
- Chad Ball, 2019–present
