= Catherine Anderson (scientist) =

Canadian scientist

- Education: University of British Columbia

Catherine Anderson is a Canadian scientist. She researched pre-eclampsia, a potentially fatal disease that can impact pregnant women, at BC Children's and Women's Hospital and the University of Nottingham. She currently serves as Clinical Assistant Professor in the Faculty of Medicine at University of British Columbia and runs the Future Science Leaders program at Science World. Maclean's described her as a "nationally renowned science educator."

== Life and career ==
As a child, Anderson dreamed of becoming a firefighter or a hockey referee, despite being unable to skate. Growing up, she was uninterested in science as her classes at school primarily focused on memorization.

Anderson attended the University of British Columbia, graduating with a BSc in Microbiology. She then worked with youth with disabilities, sang and played the piano, and spent a year travelling internationally. After seven years, she began studying Medical Genetics, receiving a Ph.D in 2002. After graduation, she accepted a postdoctoral position, researching pre-eclampsia at BC Children's and Women's Hospital and the University of Nottingham. However, while studying pre-eclampsia, she "was forced to take long term disability leave." She began working at the medical department at UBC, tutoring students, and began working on outreach and writing articles for Genome BC. This work led to her current positions at UBC and Science World.

In 2015, along with Judy Illes, a neurology professor at UBC, Anderson resigned from the Canadian Science and Engineering Hall of Fame's selection committee to protest the lack of female nominees for the induction and she worried about the message being sent to female students by this. She stated, "It's important for young people to see people who look like them being successful. The Hall of Fame is supposed to represent the best and the brightest in Canada and it's just not doing that."

In 2016, Anderson was a nominee for the YWCA Women of Distinction Awards in the Education, Training & Development category.

Anderson is married and resides in Vancouver.
