= Canadian Pharmacists Association =

Canadian professional association

Canadian Pharmacists Association (CPhA)
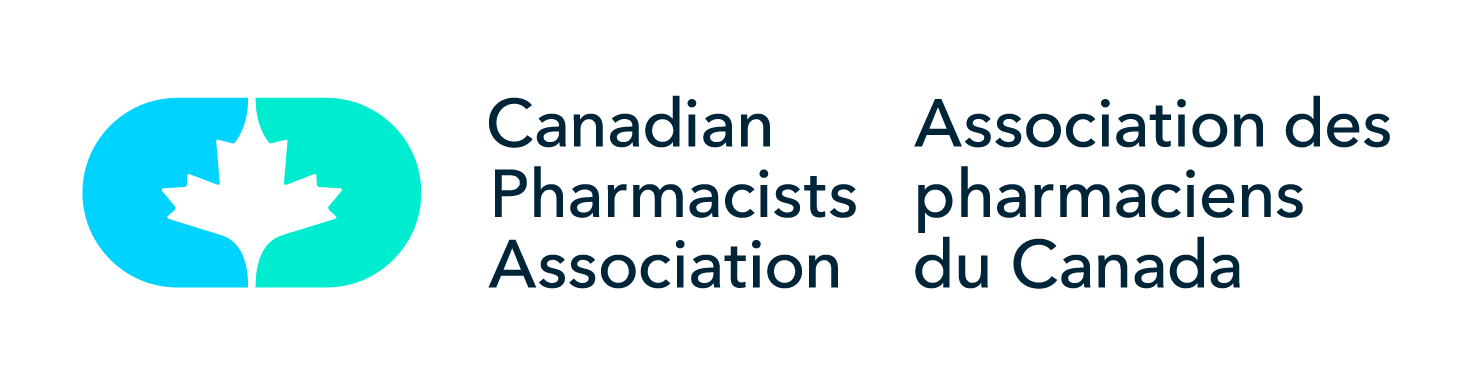
- Abbreviation: CPhA
- Formation: 1907
- Type: Professional Association
- Headquarters: Ottawa, Ontario
- Fields: Pharmacy
- Chair: Christina Tulk
- CEO: Glen Doucet
- Staff: 80
- Website: http://www.pharmacists.ca
- Formerly called: Canadian Pharmaceutical Association

The Canadian Pharmacists Association (CPhA), previously known as the Canadian Pharmaceutical Association, is an organization that serves as the professional association of Canadian pharmacists and pharmacy students. It was founded in 1907 in Toronto, Ontario. In 2014, CPhA adopted a new governance and membership model, most provincial pharmacy advocacy associations (PPAs) and select national pharmacist associations (NPAs) have become Organizational Members of CPhA. Their individual pharmacist and pharmacy student members are now CPhA Associates. The CPhA Board of Directors is made up of representatives appointed by each Organizational Member. The Board of Directors is responsible for setting the broad direction of the association.

In 1923, CPhA became the publisher of the Canadian Pharmacists Journal, which would go on to become Canada's oldest continuously published periodical. CPhA produces evidence-based drug and therapeutic resources for health care professionals in Canada. CPhA is also a leading provider of continuing professional development aimed at helping Canadian pharmacists practice to their full potential.

CPhA is funded in part by sponsorships from pharmaceutical companies including Johnson & Johnson, Pfizer, and Teva Pharmaceuticals.

== CPhA Organizational Members ==
- Alberta Pharmacists Association (RxA)
- Association of Faculties of Pharmacy of Canada (AFPC)
- Association québécoise des pharmaciens propriétaires (AQPP)
- British Columbia Pharmacy Association (BCPhA)
- Pharmacists Manitoba (PM)
- New Brunswick Pharmacists Association (NBPA)
- Ontario Pharmacists Association (OPA)
- Pharmacists' Association of Newfoundland and Labrador (PANL)
- Pharmacists' Association of Saskatchewan (PAS)
- Pharmacy Association of Nova Scotia (PANS)
- Prince Edward Island Pharmacists Association (PEIPhA)

== CPhA's Drug and Therapeutic Resources ==
CPhA's publishing department produces the following evidence-based drug and therapeutic resources:

- Compendium of Pharmaceuticals and Specialties
- Compendium of Therapeutic Choices
- Compendium of Products for Minor Ailments
- Compendium of Therapeutics for Minor Ailments
- RxTx

== CPhA's Continuing Professional Development Programs ==
- Minor Ailments
- Lab Tests
- Medication Review Services
- QUIT
- Cannabis CE
- Pharmacogenomics for Community Pharmacists
- Managing Your Pharmacy: The Business Essentials
