= Jean Dussault =

Canadian endocrinologist

Jean H. Dussault CM OQ
- Born: 1941; Quebec City, Quebec
- Died: March 23, 2003 (aged 61–62)
- Occupation: Endocrinologist

Jean H. Dussault CM OQ (1941 – March 23, 2003) was a Canadian endocrinologist. He helped develop a blood test for the early detection of congenital hypothyroidism, a condition of severely stunted physical and mental growth due to untreated congenital deficiency of thyroid hormones.

Born in Quebec City, Quebec, Dussault received a bachelor's degree from the Université de Montréal in 1960 and a Doctor of Medicine in 1965 from the Université Laval. He took his residency in Medicine at the Enfant-Jesus Hospital in Quebec City and additional research training at the University of Toronto and UCLA. In 1971, he joined the department of Endocrinology and Metabolism at the Faculté de médecine - Université Laval.

In 1982, he was nominated for the Nobel Prize in Medicine. In 1988, he was made a Member of the Order of Canada and was awarded the Ernest C. Manning Awards Foundation Innovation Award for having "formulated a method of testing infants for congenital hypothyroidism, thus saving children from irreversible mental retardation". In 2000, he was made an Officer of the National Order of Quebec. In 2007, he was inducted into the Canadian Medical Hall of Fame.
