= Duncan G. Sinclair =

American-born Canadian academic (born 1933)

Duncan G. Sinclair CM
- Born: November 2, 1933 (age 92); Rochester, New York, United States

Duncan Gordon Sinclair CM (born November 2, 1933) is an American-born Canadian academic. He was inducted into the Canadian Medical Hall of Fame in 2015.

He was born in Rochester, New York, and received a DVM from the Ontario Veterinary College, an MSc from the University of Toronto and a PhD in physiology from Queen's University. From 1962-1963 he pursued post-doctoral medical research at Columbia University and from 1963 to 1965, he pursued post-doctoral medical research at St John's College, Cambridge. From 1974 to 1983, Sinclair was dean of the Faculty of Arts and Sciences at Queen's. He later served as vice-principal of Institutional Relations, vice-principal of services, vice-principal of Health Sciences and dean of the Faculty of Medicine; Sinclair was the first non-medical doctor to be chosen as head of a faculty of medicine in Canada. He retired from Queen's in 1996 but continues to be a guest lecturer at the university. In 1997, Queen's established the Dr. Duncan G. Sinclair Lectureship in Health Services and Policy Research,

In 1989, he was named an honorary fellow in the Royal College of Physicians and Surgeons of Canada.

Sinclair was chair of the Ontario Health Services Restructuring Commission and founding chair of Canada Health Infoway. He also served on the steering committee for the review by the Ontario Ministry of Health of the Public Hospitals Act .

Duncan G. Sinclair is the father of Gord Sinclair, bassist for The Tragically Hip.
