= Stephen Blizzard =

Canadian physician and jet pilot (1928–2020)

Stephen Blizzard was a Canadian physician and jet pilot. Born in Port of Spain, Trinidad and Tobago, he studied veterinary medicine at the University of Edinburgh and was a member of the university's air squadron. He returned to Trinidad and Tobago to work as a veterinarian and receive his private pilot's license in 1955.

Blizzard emigrated to Canada in 1958 to work at the Ontario Veterinary College, but left after a year to pursue a medical degree at the University of Western Ontario with funding from the Air Force Reserve Officer Training Programme. He was the first surgical resident at the National Defence Medical Centre, and eventually became a base and flight surgeon after continued training at the Royal Canadian Airforce Institute of Aviation Medicine. At the same time he pursued additional flight training, becoming dual designated with the Royal Canadian Air Force as both a flight surgeon and a jet pilot.

Blizzard was the 16th recipient of the Dr. Forrestand Pamela Bird Lifetime Scientific Achievement Award for his work in aviation safety. He also received the Dr. Wilbur Franks Award for aviation medicine. He was named to the International Academy of Aviation and Space Medicine in 1992.
