= Lorne Babiuk =

Canadian scientist specializing in immunology, pathogenesis, virology,

Lorne Allan Babiuk
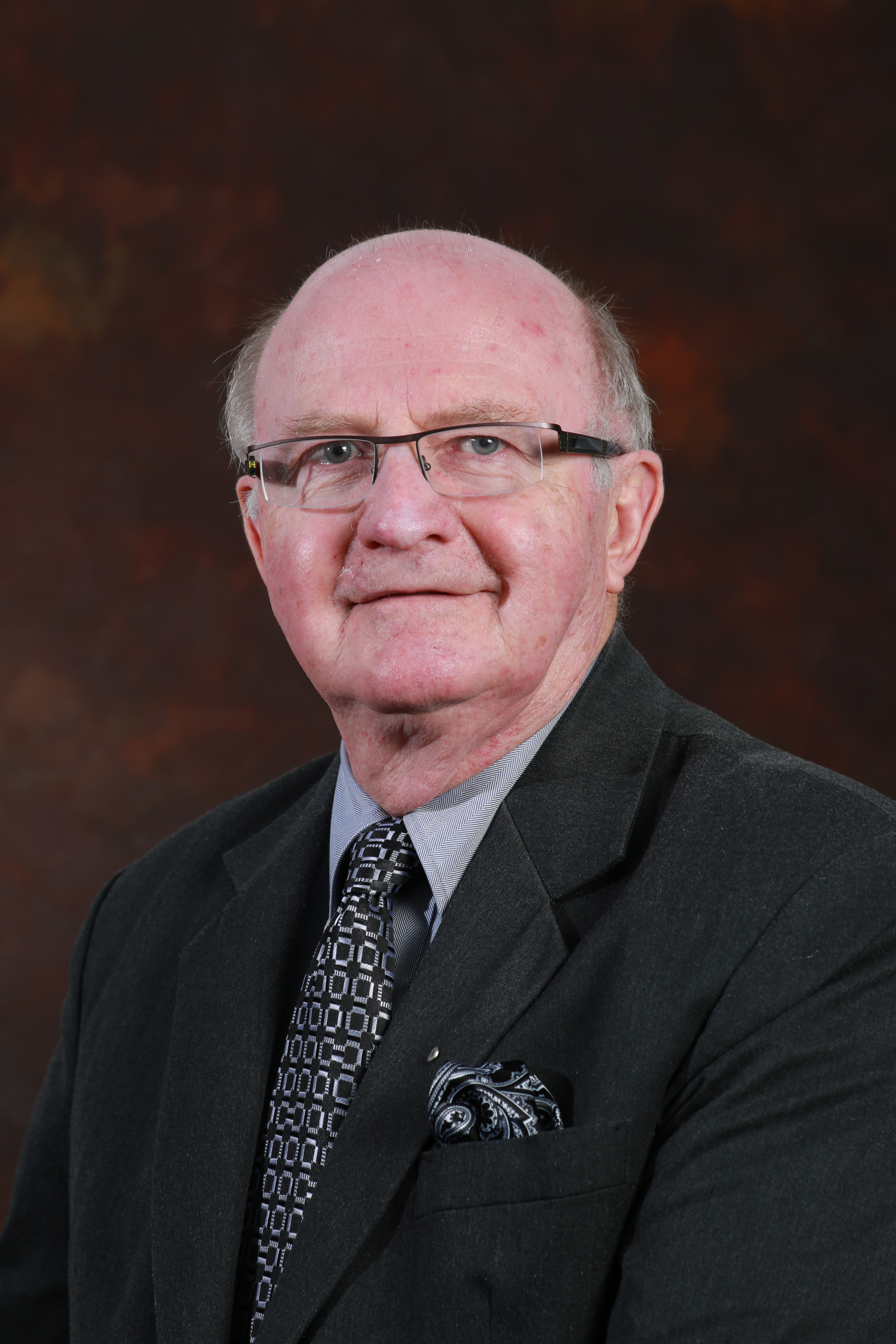
- Lorne Babiuk, April 2016
- Born: January 25, 1946 (age 80); Canora, Saskatchewan
- Education: University of Saskatchewan; University of British Columbia
- Awards: Gairdner Foundation Wightman Award; Order of Canada; Saskatchewan Order of Merit
- Scientific career
- Fields: immunology, pathogenesis, virology, molecular virology, and vaccinology
- Workplaces: University of Saskatchewan; University of Alberta

Lorne Allan Babiuk, OC SOM FRSC (born January 25, 1946) is a Canadian scientist specializing in immunology, pathogenesis, virology, molecular virology, and vaccinology. He is the Vice-President of Research at the University of Alberta and the former director of the Vaccine and Infectious Disease Organization at the University of Saskatchewan. Dr Babiuk holds the Canada Research Chair in Vaccinology and Biotechnology and is chair of the board for Pan-Provincial Vaccine Enterprise (PREVENT), a vaccine development company.

== Education ==
Born in Canora, Saskatchewan, he received a B.S.A degree in soil science from the University of Saskatchewan's College of Agriculture in 1967, a M.Sc. degree in soil microbiology from the University of Saskatchewan, Department of Soil Science in 1969, a Ph.D. in virology from the University of British Columbia, Department of Microbiology in 1972, and a D.Sc. from the University of Saskatchewan, Department of Veterinary Microbiology in 1987.

== Career ==
In 1973, he joined the University of Saskatchewan's Department of Veterinary Microbiology as an assistant professor. In 1975, he became an associate professor and a professor in 1979. In 1993, he was appointed director of the Vaccine and Infectious Disease Organization. From 2001 to 2007 Lorne Babiuk served as the chair of the advisory board of the Canadian Institutes of Health Research (CIHR) Institute of Infection & Immunity. In 2001, he was awarded the Canada Research Chair in Vaccinology and Biotechnology.

== Honours ==
- In 1999, he was made a Fellow of the Royal Society of Canada.
- In 2003, he was awarded the Saskatchewan Order of Merit.
- In 2005, he was made an Officer of the Order of Canada for his "contributions to the control of infectious diseases...on the health and productivity of livestock".
- In 2012, he was awarded the Gairdner Foundation Wightman Award for his "extraordinary national and international leadership in vaccine development and research on human and veterinary infectious disease control".
