= Charles Scriver =

Canadian pediatrician and biochemical geneticist (1930–2023)

Charles Scriver CC GOQ FRS FRSC
- Born: Charles Robert Scriver; November 7, 1930; Montreal, Quebec, Canada
- Died: April 7, 2023 (aged 92); Montreal, Quebec, Canada
- Education: McGill University
- Known for: Inborn errors of metabolism
- Awards: E. Mead Johnson Award (1968); William Allan Award (1978); John Howland Award (2010)
- Scientific career
- Fields: Pediatrics; Biochemical genetics
- Workplaces: McGill University

Charles Robert Scriver CC GOQ FRS FRSC (November 7, 1930 – April 7, 2023) was a Canadian pediatrician and biochemical geneticist. His work focused on inborn errors of metabolism and led in establishing a Canada-wide newborn metabolic screening program.

== Early life and education ==
Born in Montreal, Quebec, Scriver graduated with a Bachelor of Arts in 1951 and from the Faculty of Medicine of McGill University in 1955.

== Scientific career ==
Scriver was appointed to the Department of Paediatrics at McGill and as a Markle scholar in 1961, becoming a professor in pediatrics in 1969. He was the Samuel Rudin Distinguished Visiting Professorship at Columbia University from 1979 to 1980 and was the Alva professor Emeritus of Human Genetics in the Faculty of Medicine of McGill University.

In 1969 he discovered that rickets could be caused by vitamin D deficiency among poorer children who drank bottled milk instead of infant formula. He persuaded Quebec suppliers to add vitamin D to their milk, leading to a decrease in the rate of rickets.

Scriver played a critical role in developing scientific and ethical policies associated with the international Human Genome Project - created to decode more than three billion DNA base pairs and identify all human genes.

Scriver was co-editor of the authoritative multi-volume textbook entitled The Metabolic & Molecular Bases of Inherited Disease, published by McGraw-Hill.

== Death ==
Scriver died in Montreal on April 7, 2023, at the age of 92.

== Honours ==
- He was awarded the McLaughlin medal from the Royal Society of Canada in 1981.
- In 1985 he was made an Officer of the Order of Canada
- In 1991, he was elected a Fellow of the Royal Society.
- In 1995, he was awarded the Government of Quebec's Prix Wilder-Penfield.
- In 1996 he was promoted to Companion of the Order of Canada
- He was the 1996 recipient of the Canadian Medical Association Medal of Service, awarded to a physician who has made "an exceptional and outstanding contribution to the advancement of health care in Canada."
- In 1997 he was made a Grand Officer of the National Order of Quebec.
- In 2001 he was inducted into the Canadian Medical Hall of Fame.
- In 2001, he was inducted into the Canadian Science and Engineering Hall of Fame.
- In 2008, he was awarded the Paediatric Academic Leadership Award for Clinical Investigation by the Paediatric Chairs of Canada
- In 2010, he was honored by the American Pediatric Society with the 2010 John Howland Award
- In 2010, he was awarded the Pollin Prize for Pediatric Research
- He received honorary Doctor of Science degrees from the University of Manitoba, Glasgow University and the Université de Montréal.

== Honorary degrees ==
- The University of Western Ontario in London, Ontario; Doctor of Science (D.Sc.) June 13, 2007
