= Jean Joseph Dussault =

French librarian, journalist, and literary critic

Jean Joseph Dussault (1769–1824) was a French librarian, journalist and literary critic.
