= Child-resistant packaging =

Packaging designed to resist child access

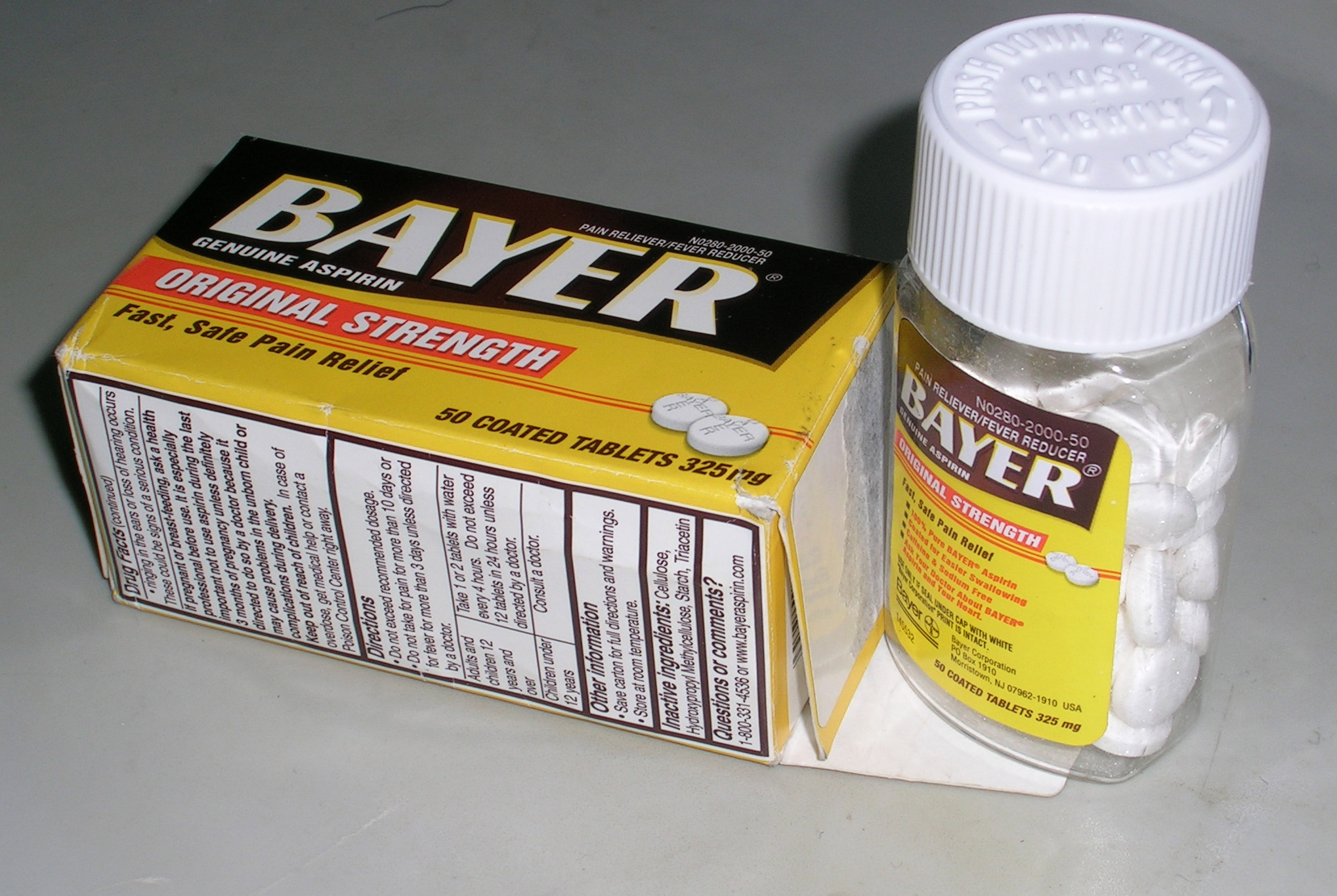
A bottle of aspirin with a child-resistant cap bearing the instruction "push down & turn to open"

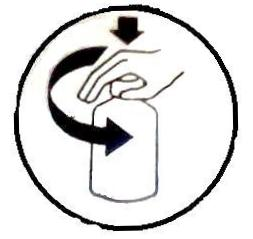
Opening many C-R packages involves two dissimilar motions

Child-resistant packaging or CR packaging is special packaging used to reduce the risk of children ingesting hazardous materials. This is often accomplished by the use of a special safety cap. It is required by regulation for prescription drugs, over-the-counter medications, Nicotine Containing Electronic Cigarette devices or Refill containers that can contain Nicotine EUTPD 36.7 pesticides, and household chemicals. In some jurisdictions, unit packaging such as blister packs is also regulated for child safety.

The U.S. Consumer Product Safety Commission has stated in a press release that "There is no such thing as child-proof packaging. So you shouldn't think of packaging as your primary line of defense. Rather, you should think of packaging, even child-resistant packaging, as your last line of defense."

== Background ==
The child-resistant locking closure for containers was invented in 1967 by Dr. Henri Breault.

A history of accidents involving children opening household packaging and ingesting the contents led the United States Congress to pass the Poison Prevention Packaging Act of 1970, authored by U.S. Senator Frank E. Moss of Utah. This gave the U.S. Consumer Product Safety Commission the authority to regulate this area. Additions throughout the decades have increased the initial coverage to include other hazardous items, including chemicals regulated by the Environmental Protection Agency. Although child-resistant lids are not perfect, there is strong evidence that use of child-resistant lids has reduced child poisoning rates in the United States substantially. Coordination exists for improving international standards on requirements and protocols.

== Difficulty opening ==
Child-resistant packaging can be a problem for some aged individuals or people with disabilities. Regulations require designs to be tested to verify that most adults can access the package. Some jurisdictions allow pharmacists to provide medications in non-CR packages when there are no children in the same house.

== Requirements ==
The regulations are based on protocols of performance tests of packages with actual children, to determine if the packages can be opened. More recently, additional package testing is used to determine if aged individuals or people with disabilities have the ability to open the same packages.

Often, the CR requirements are met by package closures which require two dissimilar motions for opening. Hundreds of package designs are available for packagers to consider.

== Standards ==
- ISO 8317 Child-resistant packaging - Requirements and testing procedures for reclosable packages.
- ISO 13127 Packaging—Child resistant packaging—Mechanical test methods for reclosable child resistant packaging systems
- ASTM D3475, Standard Classification for Child-Resistant Packages
- ASTM F3159, Consumer Safety Specification for Liquid Laundry Packets
- ASTM F2517-17 Standard Specification for Determination of Child Resistance of Portable Fuel Containers for Consumer Use

== See also ==
- Child safety lock
- Childproof
- Over-the-counter drug
- Package pilferage
- Pharmaceutical
- Screw cap
- Tamper resistance
- United States Pharmacopeia

== General and cited references ==
- Lockhart, H., and Paine, F.A., Packaging of Pharmaceuticals and Healthcare Products, 2006, Blackie, ISBN 0-7514-0167-6
- Yam, K. L., Encyclopedia of Packaging Technology, John Wiley & Sons, 2009, ISBN 978-0-470-08704-6
