= Lexicomp =

- Company type: Incorporated
- Industry: Healthcare
- Founded: 1978; 48 years ago
- Headquarters: Hudson, Ohio, United States
- Key people: Steven M. Kerscher (COO)
- Products: Mobile apps Reference handbooks Online software
- Services: Clinical Information, Advanced Technology
- Website: www.lexi.com

Lexicomp is a company that offers services, that provide access to a database containing information about medical drugs. The company's products include mobile apps, Lexicomp Online, reference handbooks, and desktop software.

== History ==
1978: Lexicomp is founded in Macedonia, Ohio by Robert D. Kerscher, former chairman and CEO.

1979-84: In 1979, Lexicomp's first custom laboratory handbook is published for Fairview General Hospital, Cleveland, Ohio. In 1984, the company publishes its own Laboratory Test Handbook and soon focuses its business model solely on medical publishing.

1986-90: Lexicomp hires founding pharmacist Leonard L. Lance, RPh and publishes its first custom drug formulary for Baptist Medical Center of Oklahoma.

1991-93: Lexicomp partners with the American Pharmacists Association (APhA) and the first drug reference handbooks were published, including the Drug Information Handbook and Pediatric Dosage Handbook.

The company's first electronic product is released: Lexicomp's Clinical Reference Library on CD-ROM.

The first edition of the Drug Information Handbook for Dentistry is introduced.

2000: To best serve the growing hospital market, Lexicomp develops and releases Lexicomp ONLINE, an Internet-based information platform. This same year, a strategic alliance with Pyxis (Cardinal Health) is developed, integrating Lexicomp's clinical information with medication management stations in hospitals around the country.

2001-03: Lexicomp launches its first software for PDA on the Palm platform; the following year, software for Pocket PC devices is released. In November 2001, the company records 1 million logged services in a year's time for Lexicomp ONLINE.

2006: Lexicomp partners with the American Society of Health-System Pharmacists (ASHP). Together, in 2007, Lexicomp ONLINE with AHFS is introduced. Software for BlackBerry is released. Soon after, the company logs reaches over 4 million logged services in Lexicomp ONLINE in just one month. Software for iPhone, iPad, iPod touch, and Android is later released.

2011: Lexicomp is acquired by Wolters Kluwer.
