= Vera Peters =

Canadian oncologist (1911–1993)

Mildred Vera Peters
- Born: April 28, 1911; Rexdale, Ontario, Canada
- Died: October 1, 1993 (aged 82); Toronto, Ontario, Canada
- Education: University of Toronto
- Scientific career
- Workplaces: Toronto General Hospital, Princess Margaret Hospital

Mildred Vera Peters, OC (28 April 1911 – 1 October 1993) was a Canadian oncologist and clinical investigator.

Peters received her medical degree from the University of Toronto in 1934. In 1950 she published a landmark paper demonstrating for the first time that many patients with early Hodgkin's disease, then considered incurable, could be completely cured if given high-dose radiation. She later went on to study the use of radiation therapy in the treatment of breast cancer. Her research, carried out at the Princess Margaret Hospital, demonstrated that breast-conserving surgery (lumpectomy) followed by radiation was just as effective as radical mastectomy which had a significant impact on the lives of the many women who experience breast cancer.

Peters' original research was met with skepticism by the medical establishment in the 1950s and she remarked in an interview that it took over 10 years for her findings to be accepted.

In recognition of her medical work Peters was awarded two honorary doctorates (from York University in 1975 and Queen's University in 1983) and in 1979 received both a gold medal from the American Society for Therapeutic Radiology and Oncology and a Medaille Antoine Beclere. In 1988 she was named a Woman of Distinction by the Canadian Breast Cancer Foundation. She was appointed a Member of the Order of Canada in 1975, raised to Officer in 1977, and was posthumously inducted into the Canadian Medical Hall of Fame in 2010.
