= James Dosman =

Canadian scientist

James Dosman (born 1938) is a Canadian scientist. He is a research chair at the University of Saskatchewan and the head of Agrivita Canada.

Born in Humboldt, Saskatchewan in 1938, Dosman graduated with a degree in medicine from the University of Saskatchewan in 1963 and specialized in respiratory medicine at McGill University. He then returned to Saskatchewan, founding the Division of Respiratory Medicine and the Centre for Agricultural Medicine. He was instrumental in the creation of the Canadian Grain Dust Medical Surveillance Program, the Canadian Coalition for Agricultural Safety and Rural Health, the Canadian Agriculture Safety Program, the Agricultural Health and Safety Network, and the National Agricultural Industrial Hygiene Laboratory. In 2006 he was named director of the Canadian Centre for Health and Safety in Agriculture, and in 2007 he founded Agrivita Canada to further research in agricultural safety. He is an Officer of the Order of Canada, a Fellow of the Royal College of Physicians, a Fellow of the Royal Society of Canada, and a Fellow of the Canadian Academy of Health Sciences. He has been named one of the 2019 inductees to the Canadian Medical Hall of Fame for his work as the "founder of agricultural medicine in Canada".
