= Claude Fortier =

Canadian physiologist (1921–1986)

- Born: June 11, 1921; Montreal, Quebec
- Died: April 22, 1986 (aged 64); Sainte-Foy, Quebec
- Scientific career
- Fields: Physiology

Claude Fortier CC (June 11, 1921 – April 22, 1986) was a Canadian physiologist and expert on the pituitary gland. From 1974 to 1975, he was the president of the Royal Society of Canada.

== Honours ==
- In 1970, he was made a Companion of the Order of Canada.
- In 1980, he was awarded the Quebec government's Prix Marie-Victorin.
- In 1998, he was inducted into the Canadian Medical Hall of Fame.

Professional and academic associations
Preceded by Guy Sylvestre	President of the Royal Society of Canada; 1974–1975	Succeeded by S. D. Clark
