= Canadian Association of General Surgeons =

Canadian professional association

The Canadian Association of General Surgeons is a professional association for general surgeons in Canada. It was founded in 1977.

== History ==
The Canadian Association of General Surgeons held its inaugural meeting on 11 May 1977 at the Royal York Hotel in Toronto, Ontario, Canada, to which all general surgeons in Canada were invited. Both the Royal College of Physicians and Surgeons of Canada and the Professional Corporation in Quebec appreciated the importance of continuing education and consultation with National Specialties Societies, and supported the establishment of the Canadian Association of General Surgeons in order to represent what were then 2000 general surgeons across the country.

== Organization ==
The Canadian Association of General Surgeons (CAGS) is the main national organization representing the interests of General Surgeons in Canada. The mission of CAGS is "Working together to empower general surgeons to improve patients’ lives through advocacy, education, and research."

The vision of CAGS is "Excellence in General Surgical Care for All". CAGS is sponsoring society of the Canadian Journal of Surgery.

CAGS offers its members a range of educational opportunities, supports surgical research, and provides a forum for Canadian General Surgeons to discuss the issues that challenge the specialty of General Surgery. CAGS sponsors a yearly meeting called the Canadian Surgery Forum. This meeting is held in a different major Canadian city each year. It also administers a yearly in-training examination administered for all residents enrolled in Canadian general surgery training programs free of charge. This examination is also offered at a fee for any CAGS member at the annual Canadian Surgery Forum. In support of research, CAGS operates a research fund called the Canadian Surgical Research Fund (CSRF). This fund was created in the 1980s to promote research by general surgeons and general surgery residents in clinical and basic science. The CSRF currently funds two research projects per year and sponsors an annual research retreat for general surgery residents across Canada.

CAGS is composed of many committees including the examination committee, the resident committee, the international surgery committee, as well as various subspecialty committees (such as the oncology committee and the head and neck surgery committee).

== Membership ==
Membership in CAGS falls under one of eight different categories:

1. Active Member: Must be licensed to practice General Surgery in North America
2. Resident: Must be enrolled in a Canadian General Surgery Program
3. In Fellowship Training: Must be enrolled in a Fellowship Program in North America
4. Affiliate Member: Allied health professional, technician, office manager, or other medical specialist (outside of General Surgery).
5. International Member: Must be a general surgeon or surgical trainee outside of North America and must provide two letters of support from active CAGS Members.
6. Medical Student: Must be enrolled in medical school in Canada or the United States accredited by Liaison Committee on Medical Education (LCME) or the Association of American Colleges (AAMC). Must submit a letter from the Department Chair or General Surgery Program Director verifying enrollment and good standing in the medical school.
7. Senior/Retired Member: Must be a retired medical practitioner who has held a valid certificate in general surgery in North America, and has been an Active Member for a minimum of five years
8. Honorary Member: Must have been an active member and nominated by the CAGS Executive

== Coat of Arms ==
Coat of arms of Canadian Association of General Surgeons

Notes
Granted 14 July 1993
Crest
Issuant from a circlet of maple leaves Gules veined Or a hand proper grasping a sword its hilt and pommel Or blade Argent fixing a dragon's head erased Gules.
Escutcheon
Or an eagle holding in its dexter talon a spear erect entwined of a serpent all Gules within a bordure compony Gules and Argent.
Motto
Sapientia Manque Apta (By Means of Wisdom and a Skillfull Hand)
