= Grace Parraga =

Canadian lung-imaging scientist

- Born: 1961 (age 64–65)

Academic background
- Education: BSc, MSc, Biochemistry, 1985, University of Western Ontario; PhD, Biochemistry, 1991, University of Washington
- Thesis: Spectroscopic studies of mutant and wildtype zinc finger peptides: testing the zinc finger hypothesis. (1991)

Grace–Eve Párraga (born 1961) is a Canadian lung-imaging scientist. She is a Tier 1 Canada Research Chair in Lung Imaging to Transform Outcomes at the University of Western Ontario.

== Early life and education ==
Parraga was born in 1961. She completed her Bachelor of Science and Master's degree in biochemistry from the University of Western Ontario (UWO) and her PhD at the University of Washington.

== Career ==
Parraga was recruited to return to her alma mater in 2004 and subsequently joined the Robarts Research Institute. In 2016, Parraga was named a UWO Faculty Scholar for her significant achievements in teaching or research. Two years later, Parraga was appointed a Tier 1 Canada Research Chair in Lung Imaging to Transform Outcomes at UWO.

During the COVID-19 pandemic, Parraga collaborated on a study to evaluate the long-term impacts of the virus. In July 2020, she co-initiated a study that used a 3.0 Tesla MRI scanner to evaluate patients’ lung structure and function at 12 weeks, six months, one year, and two years after the onset of infection. Parraga also partnered with colleagues from Ryerson University, Lakehead University, McMaster University, and SickKids Hospital to use lung imaging technology to polarize and magnetize gas that patients inhale. In September 2020, Parraga was elected a Fellow of the Canadian Academy of Health Sciences for her "pioneering research in advanced patient-based pulmonary imaging."
