= Frances Alice Shepherd =

Canadian oncologist

- Education: Department of Medicine
- Occupation: Oncologist

Frances Alice Shepherd, OC OOnt is a Canadian oncologist recognized for her research on lung cancer and her contributions to the design, development, and conduct of clinical trials. She is currently a senior staff physician at Princess Margaret Cancer Centre, where she has held the Scott Taylor Chair in Lung Cancer Research since 2001, and she is a professor in the Department of Medicine at the University of Toronto.

== Contributions ==
Dr. Shepherd has been a co-investigator or principal investigator in over 100 clinical trials and authored more than 450 peer-reviewed publications and 35 book chapters. She is on the editorial board of several journals, including the Journal of Clinical Oncology, as well as on numerous lung cancer advisory boards and data and safety monitoring boards for international lung cancer trials. She has mentored more than 30 post-doctoral research fellows.

Her past work includes serving as President of the International Association for the Study of Lung Cancer, a member of the United States National Institutes of Health Concept Evaluation Panel, Chair of the Lung Cancer Committees of the National Cancer Institute of Canada Clinical Trials Group, Chair of the American Society of Clinical Oncology Membership and Publications Committees, and the Princess Margaret Cancer Centre's Lung Cancer Site Group Leader.

== Awards ==
Shepherd has been the recipient of numerous awards.

- Jacqueline Seroussi Memorial Foundation for Cancer Research Award (2004)
- National Cancer Institute of Canada O. Harold Warwick Award for Research Excellence (2006)
- Scientific Award from the International Association for the Study of Lung Cancer Research Award (2007)
- Order of Ontario (2007)
- Ontario Premier's Summit Award for Medical Research (2008)
- Boehringer-Ingelheim Innovation Award (2010)
- British Thoracic Oncology Group International Award for Contributions to Lung Cancer (2012)
- Royal College of Physicians and Surgeons of Canada Whiteman Award and Visiting Professorship (2012)
- Wan Ki Hong Award and Visiting Professorship (2012)
- MD Anderson Cancer Center and the University of Texas (2012)
- Queen Elizabeth II Diamond Jubilee Medal (2012)
- Novartis Canada Oncology Award for Mentorship (2013)
- Claude Jacquillat Award for Cancer Research (France) (2015)
- Dr. Joseph Pater Excellence in Clinical Trials Research Award of the National Cancer Institute of Canada Clinical Trials Group (2015)
- Gairdner Foundation Wightman Award (2018)
- Order of Canada, for "her leadership in improving treatment options and outcomes for individuals with advanced lung cancer."
