= Jonathan Larmonth Meakins =

Canadian surgeon and academic

- Born: January 8, 1941 (age 85); Toronto, Ontario
- Education: McGill University; University of Western Ontario; University of Cincinnati
- Occupations: surgeon and academic
- Employer(s): McGill University; University of Oxford
- Awards: Order of Canada

Jonathan Larmonth Meakins, OC (born January 8, 1941) is a Canadian surgeon, academic, and expert in immunobiology and surgical infections.

== Life ==
Born in Toronto, Ontario, he was the son of Jonathan Fayette Meakins, in turn the son of Jonathan Campbell Meakins. He received a Bachelor of Science degree from McGill University and a Doctor of Medicine from the University of Western Ontario in 1966. He received a Doctor of Science from the University of Cincinnati in 1972.

In 1974, he was appointed an assistant professor of Surgery and microbiology at McGill University. He was appointed an associate professor in 1979 and a professor in 1984. From 1988 to 1993, he was the chair of the department of surgery. He was surgeon-in-chief at Montreal's Royal Victoria Hospital.

From 2002 to 2008, he was the fourth person and first Canadian appointed to lead the Nuffield Department of Surgery at the University of Oxford as Nuffield Professor of Surgery and fellow of Balliol College, Oxford.

In 1992, he became co-editor of the Canadian Journal of Surgery. He is the author of Surgical Infection in Critical Care Medicine (1985) and Surgical Infections: Diagnosis and Treatment (1994). He is the co-author of Surgical Care of the Elderly (1988), The Care of the Surgical Patient (1988), and Host Defence Dysfunction in Trauma, Shock and Sepsis: Mechanisms and Therapeutic Approaches (1993).

In 1985, Meakins won the James IV Association of Surgeons Canadian Travelling Fellowship. In 2000, he was made an officer of the Order of Canada "as a leader in the development of laparoscopic and transplantation surgery".

He received an honorary DSc from McGill University in 2015 and an honorary DSc from Western University in 2018. In 2022, Meakins was inducted into the Canadian Medical Hall of Fame.
