= Calvin Stiller =

Canadian scientist (born 1941)

Calvin Ralph Stiller (born February 12, 1941) is a Canadian physician, scientist, and entrepreneur. He retired as a member of the Schulich School of Medicine & Dentistry at Western University in London, Ontario.

== Early life and education ==
Stiller is from Naicam, Saskatchewan. He was born to Mildred Stiller (née Parsons) and the Reverend Hilmer Stiller, a minister ordained by the Pentecostal Assemblies of Canada. Stiller spent his childhood and adolescence in Naicam, Tisdale, and Saskatoon. Stiller graduated from Bedford Road Collegiate and completed two years of undergraduate pre-medical studies in Arts and Science at the University of Saskatchewan. He graduated with an MD from the University of Saskatchewan in 1965.

== Career ==
Stiller completed his post-graduate fellowship studies at the University of Western Ontario in London, Ontario and the University of Alberta in Edmonton. Stiller developed a specialization in nephrology, as well as in the related areas of transplantation, immunology, and infection. In 1972, he received his fellowship designation of FRCP(C) in the Royal College of Physicians and Surgeons of Canada. He co-founded the Robarts Research Institute in 1986.

Stiller was an early adopter of computerized patient records; he was a partner in the firm that co-created the first form of telemedicine offered by the Government of Ontario. The eventual widespread success of organ transplantation led to Stiller’s establishing the Multi-Organ Transplant Service and the Canadian Centre for Transplantation in London, over which he acted as chief from 1984 until 1996. Stiller was principal investigator in the early 1980s in the clinical trials and market development of the drug cyclosporine for use as a first-line therapy for transplant rejection. He and his brother, the Reverend Brian Stiller, co-authored Lifegifts: The Real Story of Organ Transplants, an account of the history of human organ transplants. Stiller was on a team of researchers that proved that human type 1 diabetes is an autoimmune disorder and therefore amenable to immunosuppressant treatment.

Stiller co-founded the Canadian Medical Discoveries Fund Inc., which has raised and managed over half a billion dollars in assets. Stiller served as founder and chair of the Ontario Institute for Cancer Research, as well as the chair of Genome Canada. Along with Dr. John Evans, a former president of the University of Toronto, and Ken Knox, Stiller catalyzed the 2000 launch of the Medical and Related Science (MaRS) Discovery District in downtown Toronto, and then served as its director. Stiller was invited by the then Premier of Ontario, Mike Harris, to chair the Ontario Research and Development Challenge Fund, which, together with the Ontario Innovation Trust, would provide over $1.2-billion in R&D support during the following decade to Ontario universities in an alliance with research-intensive businesses.

== Awards and distinctions ==
Stiller was named Ontario Entrepreneur of the Year in 1996. In 2000, Western University established the Novartis-Calvin Stiller Chair in Xenotransplantation. That year, he was made a Member of the Order of Ontario. In 2002, the namesake Stiller Centre for Technology Commercialization was opened in London. He was recognized by his alma mater, the University of Saskatchewan, in its "100 Graduates of Influence", an all-time list celebrated to mark the university's centenary in 2007. In 2012, he was invested as an Officer of the Order of Canada, having been invested as a Member in 1995.

In 2010, Stiller was inducted into the Canadian Medical Hall of Fame. Also in 2010, he was made a Distinguished Fellow of the Canadian Academy of Health Sciences, and won the highly prestigious Canada Gairdner Wightman Award.

== External sites ==
- Tribute video
