= Jonathan Campbell Meakins =

Canadian physician and medical author

Jonathan Campbell Meakins CBE FRSE (18 May 1882 – 12 October 1959) was a Canadian physician and medical author and member of the Canadian Medical Hall of Fame. In authorship he is known as J. C. Meakins. He published over 160 works, including the textbook The Practice of Medicine. He was also the founder and first president of the Royal College of Physicians and Surgeons of Canada. He was the Dean of the McGill University's Faculty of Medicine from 1941 to 1948.

== Life ==
Meakins was born on 16 May 1882 in Hamilton, Ontario, the son of Elizabeth Campbell and Charles William Meakins. He received his medical degree from the University of Sydney in 1904. In 1909 he joined McGill University's Faculty of Medicine as a Demonstrator in Clinical Medicine. In 1912 he was appointed Secretary to the Committee on Experimental Medicine. While at McGill University, he held a number of positions in pathology and experimental medicine before becoming Dean of the Faculty of Medicine, a position he held from 1941 to 1948. In addition, he served as director of the Department of Experimental Medicine from 1918 to 1919 and 1924–1948, and Director of the University Medical Clinic from 1927 to 1948. During World War I he served in the Canadian Army Medical Corps. After studying posttraumatic stress disorder and gas poisoning during the World War I, he became Deputy Director of Medical Services with the rank of brigadier during the World War II, and was created a Commander of the Order of the British Empire for his services.

After the war, in 1919, he took up the post as Professor of Therapeutics at the University of Edinburgh. In 1922 he was elected a Fellow of the Royal Society of Edinburgh. His proposers were James Lorrain Smith, Henry Briggs, Sir James Walker and James Hartley Ashworth. While at the University of Edinburgh, he was one of the first medical researchers to administer and study the effects of insulin. In 1924 he was elected a member of the Harveian Society of Edinburgh.

In 1924, he moved back to Canada as Professor of Medicine at McGill University where he remained until his retirement in 1947. He died in Montreal on 12 October 1959.

== Family ==
Meakins married twice, first to Dorothy Brown (died 1926) and then to Sara Caldwell Young. He is father to Jonathan Lafayette Meakins and grandfather of Jonathan Larmonth Meakins.

== Publications ==
- Meakins, Jonathan Campbell (1936). The practice of medicine (1st ed.). St. Louis: C. V. Mosby Company. p. xv, 1343.
- Meakins, J. C.; Priestley, J. G. (November 1919). "The After Effects of Chlorine Gas Poisoning". Canadian Medical Association Journal. 9 (11): 968–974. PMC 1523693. PMID 20311346.
- Meakins, Jonathan C. (May 1942). "Modern Trends in Medical Practice". Canadian Medical Association Journal. 46 (5): 449–456. PMC 1827281. PMID 20322448.
