= Vladimir Hachinski =

Canadian clinical neuroscientist

Vladimir Hachinski CM OOnt FRCPC FRSC
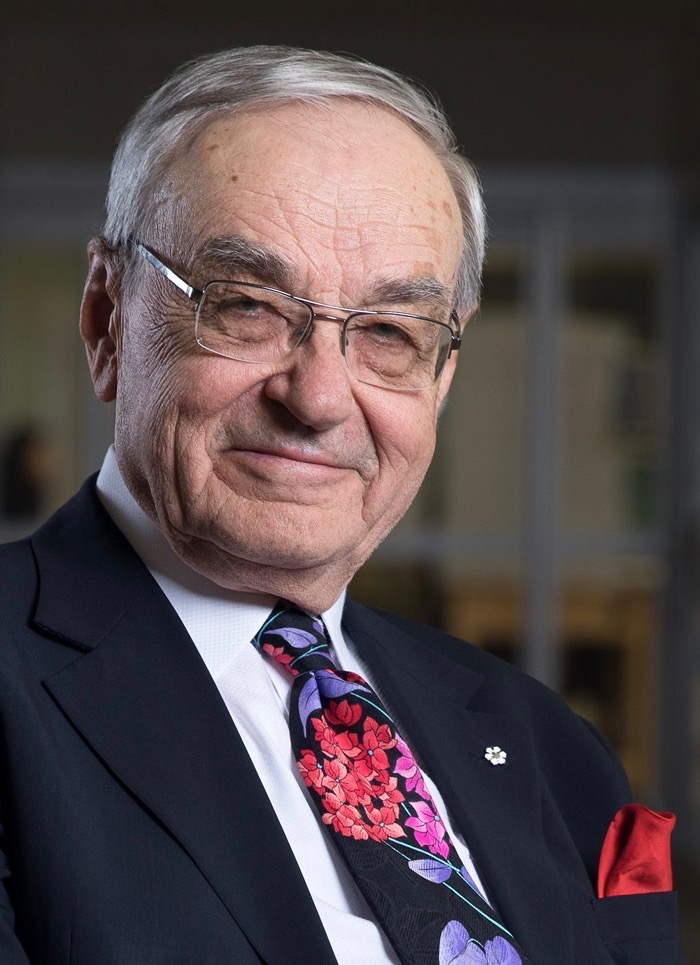

Personal details
- Born: Zhytomyr, Ukrainian Soviet Socialist Republic, USSR
- Occupation: Neuroscientist
- Known for: Hachinski Ischemic Score

Vladimir Hachinski is a Canadian neurologist, clinical neuroscientist and Distinguished University Professor in the Department of Clinical Neurological Sciences at the Schulich School of Medicine and Dentistry at Western University. He is also a Senior Scientist at London's Robarts Research Institute. His research pertains in the greatest part to stroke and dementia, their interactions, and their joint prevention through integral brain health promotion. He and John W. Norris helped to establish the world's first successful acute stroke unit at Sunnybrook Hospital in Toronto, and, by extension, helped establish stroke units as the standard of care for stroke patients worldwide. He discovered that the control of the heart by the brain is asymmetric, the fight/flight (sympathetic) response being controlled by the right hemisphere and the rest and digest (parasympathetic) response being controlled by the left hemisphere and damage to one key component (the insula) can lead to heart rhythm irregularities and sudden death. This discovery has added fundamental knowledge to how the brain controls the heart and how to prevent sudden death.

Hachinski has held many prominent positions in the global neurology community, including editor-in-chief of the journal Stroke (the leading publication in the field), president of the World Federation of Neurology, and founder of World Brain Alliance. He is a Fellow of the Royal Society of Canada (FRSC) and the Canadian Academy of Health Sciences (FCAHS), a Member of the Orders of Ontario and Canada, the Medical Hall of Fame and the recipient of several national and international awards and recognitions for his research, mentorship, and advocacy in stroke, dementia, public health and healthy aging.

== Early life, education, and early career ==
Hachinski was born in Zhytomyr, Ukraine, the eldest of three children. He moved with his family first to Germany and then to Caripito, Venezuela as a child. The family moved to Port Perry, Ontario, Canada thereafter. He graduated from Port Perry High School a year later at the top of his class.

Hachinski received his MD in 1966 from the University of Toronto, and completed his residency in internal medicine and neurology in Toronto and Montreal, followed by a neurophysiology fellowship in Toronto. He received his formal accreditation in neurology as a Fellow of the Royal College of Physicians and Surgeons of Canada (FRCPC) in 1972. From 1973-74, a research fellowship with the Ontario Department of Health brought him to a cerebrovascular laboratory at the National Hospital for Nervous Diseases in London, England, and then to the Department of Clinical Physiology at Bispebjerg Hospital in Copenhagen, Denmark.

Following this, he returned to Toronto to take a staff position in the Department of Neurosciences at Sunnybrook Medical Centre, where he and Dr. John W. Norris established the MacLachlan Stroke Unit, Canada's first acute stroke unit. Hachinski remained at Sunnybrook until 1980, when he moved to London, Ontario to act as a neurology consultant for its major health centres: University Hospital, Victoria Hospital, St. Joseph's Hospital, and the London Psychiatric Hospital. He was hired concurrently as a professor at Western University (then called the University of Western Ontario). During this time (and until 1990), he also acted as Director of the Investigative Stroke Unit at London's University Hospital.

In 1987, he earned a Master of Science degree from McMaster University in Hamilton, Ontario, studying in the Department of Epidemiology and Biostatistics with a focus on design, measurement, and evaluation. The University of London's highest earned degree, Doctor of Science (in Hachinski's case, in medicine), was conferred upon him in 1988 for his "contributions to migraine, stroke, and dementia."

== Research ==
=== Vascular cognitive impairment ===
At the beginning of Hachinski's career, the view prevailed that most dementias were caused by hardening of brain arteries (cerebral atherosclerosis). The hypothesis was that a slow strangulation of the brain's blood supply leads to neuronal death and dementia. Hachinski showed in 1975 that, when the dementia was through brain artery disease, most were from "multi-infarct dementias" (his concept) — caused by multiple, small, often symptomless strokes. His term "vascular cognitive impairment" would later be widely adopted to describe the vascular component that occurs in most major dementias. This is an important concept since stroke doubles the risk of dementia and strokes are treatable and preventable. Some dementias are as well. He has offered an explanation for the origin of some of these lesions and associated symptoms through his concept of the ambibaric brain. He postulates that the brain has two complementary blood pressure systems, one high and one low and disturbances in each lead to different types of preventable lesions.

The hardening of the arteries explanation spawned a whole industry of brain vessel "vasodilators". He showed that "vasodilators" were not only expensive but useless. He also developed the "Hachinski Ischemic Score" that continues to be widely used to identify the vascular cognitive impairment, a treatable and preventable component of dementia. Identifying the vascular component is tremendously important for patient prognosis, as treating the vascular causes of dementias can mitigate their effects. The score is cited in the medical literature about once every ten days, and has been validated and optimized for use in clinical practice.

In 1986, the journal, Archives of Neurology published a series of papers by Hachinski, Harold Merskey and colleagues on the rarefaction (decreased density) of white matter in the brains of older adults. These papers were among the first to recognize the importance of white matter lesions as risks for stroke and dementia. Rarefaction of white matter in the brain had already been shown to be correlated with a wide variety of health problems, but these papers were groundbreaking for two reasons especially: First, they introduced the term, "leukoaraiosis," to warn that white matter changes can have multiple causes and second, they specifically highlighted a previously underappreciated relationship between hypertension and leukoaraiosis. By coining "leukoaraiosis," Hachinski drew medical practitioners' attention to these white matter hypodensities in the brains of patients affected by small strokes.

Hachinski continued to develop and promote his novel approach to dementia — viewing it as a product of preventable and treatable vascular problems, thus itself also amenable to prevention, delay, and mitigation — eventually coining it as the "vascular cognitive impairment approach" to dementias in 1994. This proactive and preventative, rather than solely retroactive and treatment-based approach included other novel coinages, such as "brain at risk," describing patients without cognitive impairment but with risk factors for it.

Even with these developments, available diagnostic criteria for dementias continued to present a challenge, as they were not able to capture the complex, interactive, and adaptive nature of brain pathologies leading to dementia. For this reason, in 2006, Hachinski decided to lead (with Gabrielle LeBlanc) the development of core common standards to describe the clinical, neuropsychological, imaging, genetic, and neuropathological features of cognitive impairment. This standardization has allowed for ongoing improvement of the diagnostic criteria with new knowledge, comparison of results from different studies, and analysis & meta-analysis using "big data" techniques.

=== Acute stroke ===
The MacLachlan Stroke Unit at Sunnybrook, Canada's first stroke unit (est. 1975), was almost 20 years ahead of its time; stroke units have been considered the most effective treatment for stroke patients of all ages, severities, and types only since the 1990s. Hachinski and Norris' early work with that unit and others helped to cement the importance of dedicated wards for stroke patient monitoring and treatment, but his research over the next 17 years also shaped how those treatments and monitoring methods are executed.

In 1986, while he was Director of the Investigative Stroke Unit at University Hospital in London, he developed (with Robert Coté), the Canadian Neurological Scale – a simple but systematic tool, usable by non-physicians for evaluating and monitoring the neurological status of patients with acute stroke. It has been incorporated in the medical record of the province Quebec, Canada. Later, in 1992, he (with collaborators David Cechetto and Stephen Oppenheimer) began work to explore possible mechanisms for observed increases in catecholamines, cardiac enzymes, arrhythmias, and sudden death following acute stroke. This would eventually lead to the discovery that the insula of the brain is the mediator of these various cardiac complications. Knowing this alters doctors to monitor the heart closely, to prevent sudden death.

The scientific bases for preventing stroke and dementia together have been summarized by an international panel of experts.

Since stroke, heart disease and dementia represent risks for each other and share the same risk and protective factors, he advocates preventing this "Triple Threat" together.

He is a participant in an initiative to make brain health the top priority. He has offered a comprehensive and understandable definition of brain health. When thinking, feeling and connecting are the best that they can be in a safe, healthy, and supportive environment. He also designed a simple method to measure it (The Hachinski integral brain health index). He co-leads the development of implementation of integral brain health (cerebral, mental, and social) in the city of London, Canada.

=== Stroke prevention ===
In addition to his interest in the mechanisms of stroke and best practices for treatment, Hachinski also has a keen research interest in stroke prevention. He acted as the principal neurological investigator of two seminal, multicentre studies, led by Henry JM Barnett. First the Extracranial/Intracranial Arterial Bypass Surgery trial (1983–87). It showed that the increasingly popular and very expensive EC/IC arterial bypass procedure did not significantly reduce the risk of ischemic stroke.

The second was the North American Symptomatic Carotid Endarterectomy Trial that showed that the operation helped prevent stroke in patients with symptoms from a narrowing in the carotid arteries.

=== Population health ===
Hachinski's home province of Ontario, Canada introduced a formal Provincial Stroke System in 2000. Hachinski advocates a strategy of preventing some dementias through the prevention of stroke. With his colleagues, he showed, for the first time, a concomitant decrease in the incidence of stroke and dementia at a whole-population level. The total number of cases continues to rise, however, due to population aging. Stroke and dementia tend to occur together and share common risk factors. Regretfully, they are addressed separately, especially dementia.

==== Integral Brain Health Implementation Strategy CanDo ====
He advocates the implementation of integral brain health for the life course as a means for preventing brain diseases and building brain capital in the age of automation, artificial intelligence and the knowledge based economy. Stroke and dementia account for the majority of disability adjusted life years (DALYs), a combined measure of premature death and disability. They are increasing because of global population aging. The CanDo Integral Brain Health Implementation Strategy addresses this challenge in a small steps cumulative, cooperative, complementary approach. It focuses on individuals undergoing change (e.g. new employees and their partners, expectant parents, employees and their partners) a year before or after retirement. The prevention of stroke, heart disease and dementia through integral brain health (cerebral, mental and social) has been simplified to five actions — Blood pressure control, Activity, Sleep, Ingestion, Consumption and Support (BASIC-S). The impacts of these changes will be measured in participants with the Integral Brain Health Index and BASIC-S Index as they are low cost, effective, accessible and long-term. The impacts of these changes will be measured in participants with the Integral Brain Health Index and BASIC-S Index.

== Key administrative positions and advocacy ==
- 2015 led the development of a Proclamation about the joint prevention of stroke and dementia, endorsed by all the major international organizations dealing with both. Since then leading the effort to implement the Proclamation on behalf of the World Stroke Organization.
- 2011–2013: Founding chair, World Brain Alliance, a collection of international organizations promoting brain/mental health and reducing brain/mental health disorders, founded on three premises:
  1. There is no health without brain health
  2. Brain health begins with the mother's and the child's education
  3. Our brains are our future
- 2010-13 : President, World Federation of Neurology (WFN); first Canadian president in its six-decade history. During his presidency he updated the WFN's mission to "foster quality neurology and brain health worldwide" and introduced World Brain Day in collaboration with Mohammad Wasay.
- 2006-10: Vice President (North America), WFN
- 2000-10: Editor-in-Chief, Stroke He introduced 9 international editions and a mentorship program for authors from developing countries.
- 2008-12 : Vice President, World Stroke Organization
- 2004-06: Led working group to develop World Stroke Agenda (2004, Vancouver) and World Stroke Day Proclamation (2006, Cape Town), observed every October 29.

== Non-scientific publications ==
=== Popular (medicine) ===
Hachinski's primary popular medicine contributions have been publications in cooperation with his son, Vladimir, and daughter, Larissa. With Vladimir, he published an article in the Journal of the Canadian Medical Association called, "Music and the Brain" in August 1994. With Larissa, he published the book, Stroke: A Comprehensive Guide to Brain Attack in 2003. The book was written to increase public awareness of the importance of adequate stroke care and early intervention. It had Canadian, American, British and Polish editions. The term "brain attack" was intended to convey the urgency of seeking immediate attention for sudden symptoms — including loss of speech or weakness of an arm, leg or both — whether they persist or resolve.

=== Medical historical ===
A strong interest in the history of medicine has led Hachinski to join the Toronto Medical Historical Club, where he served as president from 1980 to 1981. Upon his arrival at Western University in 1981, Hachinski co-founded the London Medical Historical Association (LMHA) with Paul Potter, who was the Hannah Professor of the History of Medicine at Western University at the time. The Hannah Professorship is associated with the Hannah Institute for the History of Medicine in Canada; chairs are established to promote the study and teaching of the history of medicine in Canadian universities.

Subsequently, he published several articles and a poem about the legendary founder of medicine:

- Hachinski, V (March 1999). "Stalin's last years: delusions or dementia?". European Journal of Neurology. 6 (2): 129–132. doi:10.1111/j.1468-1331.1999.tb00004.x. PMID 10053223. S2CID 44833937.
- Hachinski, Vladimir (1997). "Kos (A poem about Hippocrates)". The Lancet. 349 (9064): 1561. doi:10.1016/S0140-6736(05)62150-2. S2CID 208790603.
- Gasecki, Andrew P.; Hachinski, Vladimir (1996). "On the names of Babinski". Canadian Journal of Neurological Sciences. 23 (1): 76–79. doi:10.1017/s0317167100039226. PMID 8673967.
- Hachinski, Vladimir (1993). "Neurology in Islamic Spain: a call for further research". Journal of the History of the Neurosciences. 2 (1): 45–51. doi:10.1080/09647049309525551. PMID 11618443.
- "Cajal: crossroads to greatness". Annals of the Royal College of Physicians and Surgeons of Canada. 25: 290–292. 1992.
- Hachinski, Vladimir (1986). "H.J.M Barnett: a biographical sketch". Surgical Neurology. 26 (6): 529–531. doi:10.1016/0090-3019(86)90334-4. PMID 3535140.
- "H.J.M Barnett: a biographical sketch." "Modern Neurosurgical Giants" Ed: Bucy PC. Elsevier, New York, pp. 35–38, 1986.
- "Transient cerebral ischemia: a historical sketch." In: Historical Aspects of the Neurosciences. (Eds) Rose FC, Bynum WF. Raven Press, New York, pp. 185–193, 1982.

=== Arts and humanities ===
He possesses an honours degree in history from the University of London, UK, is a Corresponding Member of the North American Academy of the Spanish Language (a corresponding academy of the Royal Spanish Academy) and has published a poetry anthology, Resonancias, in Spanish under the pen name Alejandro Aranda. In addition, "Dream Waltz," composed by Hachinski and orchestrated by Jason Stanford (Professor of Theory and Composition at Western University), premiered at the Musikverein in Vienna, Austria by the Brno Philharmoniker on September 24, 2013.

== Honours and recognition ==
=== Awards/recognitions ===
Over the course of his career, Hachinski has been the recipient of many awards and recognitions in his field. The most notable are outlined below.

- 2024: The Ryman Prize for “the world’s best discovery, development, advance or achievement that enhances quality of life for older people”
- 2022: The Potamkin Prize for Research in Pick's, Alzheimer's, and Related Diseases (“The dementia Nobel”)
- 2021: The World Federation of Neurology Medal for “Services to World Neurology”
- 2021: The 41st T.S. Srinivasan Oration and gold medal and scroll
- 2020: Distinguished Inaugural Lecture at the foundation of the African Stroke Organization
- 2020: The American Academy of Neurology Wartenberg Lecture & Award
- 2020: Awarded F.N.G. Starr Award of the Canadian Medical Association's The highest award that can be given to one of its members
- 2018: Awarded the Killam Prize in health sciences.
- 2017: Prince Mahidol Award in the field of Public Health,
- 2016: The McLaughlin Medal of the Royal Society of Canada for “research of sustained excellence in medical science”
- 2015: Scientist Career Award, Lawson Health Research Institute
- 2014: Fellowship in the Royal Society of Canada
- 2014: Karolinska Stroke Award for Excellence in Stroke Research
- 2013: Chancellor's Award Lecture in Neuroscience and Neurology, University of Louisiana
- 2013: Queen Elizabeth II Diamond Jubilee Medal
- 2012: Order of Ontario
- 2010: Ontario Premier's Discovery Award in life sciences and medicine
- 2010: Biomedical Science Ambassador Award, Partners In Research
- 2010: International Bial Merit Award in Medical Sciences
- 2010: Leadership in Stroke Medicine Award, World Stroke Organization
- 2008: Member of the Order of Canada
- 2006: Distinguished University Professor, Western University
- 2005: Fellowship in the Canadian Academy of Health Sciences
- 2005: Thomas Willis Award, American Stroke Association
- 2000: Mihara Award in research on cerebrovascular disorders
- 1990: Ontario Trillium Clinical Scientist Award
- 1989: Featured in Canadian Who's Who

=== Honorary degrees ===
Hachinski holds four honorary doctorates. The first, Doctor of Medicine honoris causa from the University of Salamanca, Spain (the oldest university of the Spanish speaking world founded in 1218) was awarded in 2000. This was followed by Doctor of the University honoris causa from the University of Buenos Aires, Argentina (2005), Doctor of Medicine honoris causa from the University of Cordoba, Argentina (2007), and Doctor honoris causa from the Russian Academy of Medical Sciences (2012).
