= Henry J. M. Barnett =

Physician and stroke researcher

Henry Joseph Macaulay Barnett
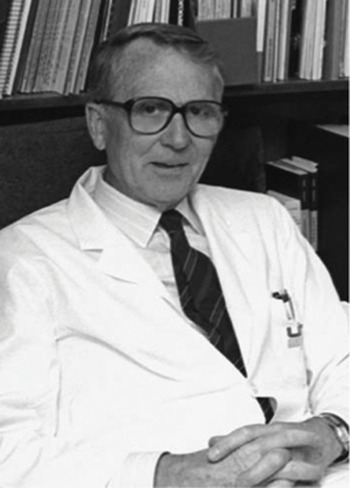
- H.J.M. "Barney" Barnett
- Born: 10 February 1922; Newcastle upon Tyne, England
- Died: 20 October 2016 (aged 94); Toronto, Ontario, Canada
- Education: University of Toronto
- Occupations: Physician, clinical research scientist, neurologist
- Known for: stroke prevention, international randomized clinical trials, President of Robarts Research Institute
- Spouse: Kathleen (Kay) Gourlay
- Awards: Order of Canada, honorary Doctor of Laws degree, honorary Doctor or Science degree
- Scientific career
- Notable students: J. David Spence, Vladimir Hachinski, George Ebers, Donald Paty, Tom Feasby, Alastair Buchan

Henry Joseph Macaulay Barnett CC (10 February 1922 – 20 October 2016), known by his colleagues and friends as "Barney", was a Canadian physician and neurologist. He was also a leading clinical stroke researcher as a result of being the principal investigator in several major clinical trials. As a clinical scientist, he did pioneering research in stroke prevention, beginning with the use of aspirin.

== Professional career ==
After graduating from the University of Toronto Schools he received his medical degree from the University of Toronto in 1944, while working summers in pathology. He was interested in pursuing pathology and this summer work first exposed him to the structure of the diseased human brain.

After medical school, he did postgraduate training in Neurology in Toronto, London and Oxford, working under Charles Symonds, Hugh Cairns and Richard Doll. On faculty in Toronto as a neurologist from 1952 to 1969, he gained enormous experience early in his career. His neurology service at Sunnybrook Hospital occupied 70 beds and he first recognized carotid stump syndrome, stroke from mitral prolapse, external carotid artery steal, post-traumatic syringomyelia and tumor-related syringomyelia. He founded the Department of Neurosciences at Sunnybrook Hospital in 1967.

He started to work at the University Hospital in London, Ontario and the University of Western Ontario in 1974, persuaded to leave Toronto by his friend and neurosurgeon Charles Drake. Together, they founded the Department of Clinical Neurological Sciences, which was multidisciplinary and the world's first to include neurology, neurosurgery, neuroradiology and neuropathology faculty appointments.

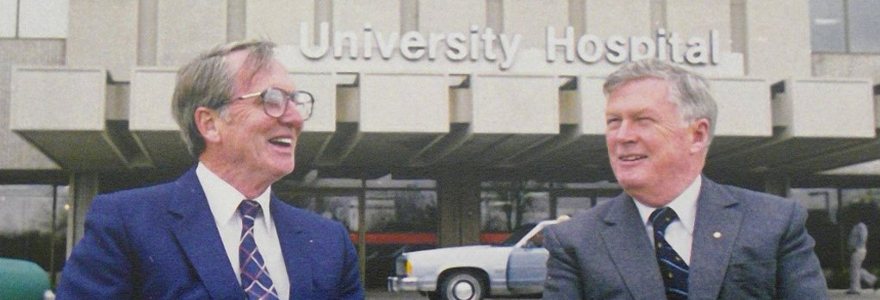
Henry Barnett and Charles Drake in front of the University Hospital, London, in 1973

Dr. Barnett was the founding president of the Canadian Stroke Society, which later merged with the Heart and Stroke Foundation of Canada, which had been formed in 1952.

He was a reviewer for many medical and scientific journals including Stroke. He served as its chief editor from 1982 to 1987 and ultimately, his own biography appeared in that journal, written by his disciple-neurologists J David Spence and Vladimir Hachinski.

From its founding in 1986, he was the president and scientific director of Robarts Research Institute until his retirement in 1995.

Dr. Barnett was innately scientific and curious. He did not suffer fools gladly, projecting power while remaining affable. His trainees were in fear of being late for any rounds or appointment. Consults were expected to be on the chart within 24 hours, without exception. He taught that 95% of the diagnosis was in the history and that the most important thing was to never miss anything treatable.

He was a fierce negotiator with his dean. As part of his agreement to come to London, he wrested 3 appointments for neuropathologists to be hired, unheard of for a city of ¼ million, the size of London, Ontario at the time. He succeeded in this negotiation, and thus neuropathologists Melvyn J. Ball, Joseph J. Gilbert and John C.E. Kaufmann were hired, Dr. Kaufmann being convinced by Barnett to move to Canada from South Africa. On Barnett's arrival in London, there were 2 neurologists already, and the question he was asked was why any more would be needed. By providing a valuable service, the Neurology team grew quickly from 2 Neurologists and no residents to 14 Neurologists and 6 residents.

During that period, neuroradiology was routinely utilized, and every stroke patient underwent a carotid angiogram to analyze the event. Barnett became a foundational figure in the field of stroke neurology.

Neuropathology was deemed core by Barnett, who had spent summer time in pathology as a medical student. Running an academic enterprise, he insisted that an autopsy was done on every patient who died, so learning could occur and families could have closure. Results were presented in weekly clinico-pathologic conferences that everyone in the Department of Clinical Neurological Sciences, both faculty and residents in training, would compulsorily attend. The result was an interdisciplinary atmosphere that was unrivalled at the time, and still, few centers have Departments of Clinical Neurosciences where all 4 disciplines of clinical neuroscience (Neurology, Neurosurgery, Neuroradiology, Neuropathology) are appointed and mingle to discuss patients.

== Clinical trials ==
Dr. Barnett published the results of his clinical trials in The New England Journal of Medicine.

=== Aspirin in stroke ===
Aspirin had been used to prevent stroke since the 1960s but had not been scientifically proven to be effective in a randomized clinical trial. By inhibiting the enzyme cyclooxygenase, aspirin blocks the production of thromboxane in platelets, potentially reducing clot formation and preventing ischemic stroke. After obtaining funding from the Medical Research Council of Canada, in 1978, Barnett published the results from 585 patients in his randomized clinical trial demonstrating the effectiveness of aspirin in preventing stroke.

=== EC-IC bypass surgery ===
Barnett applied to the NIH for a grant to study the effectiveness of then commonly performed cerebral bypass surgery, which re-routed blood flow from the extracranial to the intracranial circulation. As principal investigator, he enrolled 1377 patients into this randomized trial, finding that, regardless of the size of the medical centre performing these operations, this surgery did not work to improve patient outcome in focal ischemic stroke, publishing these results in 1985. Many patients with focal ischemic stroke arising from the carotid artery or the heart were saved from needless surgery as a result, but the surgical procedure may still find usefulness in diseases that are related to more global, slow reduction of cerebral blood flow over longer time periods, such as Moyamoya disease, giant aneurysms or skull base surgery requiring sacrifice of major vessels for tumor removal.

=== North American Symptomatic Carotid Endarterectomy Trial (NASCET) ===
Another common surgical procedure alleged to prevent stroke was studied by Barnett, carotid endarterectomy. This surgical procedure on the neck removes the source of thrombi that form and then detach and embolize to occlude brain vessels from atherosclerotic plaque from the bifurcation of the carotid artery in the neck. The procedure had been done since 1954 but without proof of effectiveness in preventing stroke, and was declining. After applying for and receiving NIH grant funding to test the hypothesis that the procedure worked in patients with over 70% carotid stenosis, Barnett recruited 659 patients into his randomized clinical trial, finding this surgery effective in preventing stroke. European centres were finding similar results, and thus Dr. Barnett spearheaded the establishment of carotid artery surgery for preventing stroke.

The question remained if carotid endarterectomy was beneficial in patients with lower degrees of carotid stenosis, i.e. less than 70%. To answer that question, Barnett and colleagues randomly enrolled 2226 patients, 1108 receiving carotid endarterectomy and 1118 receiving medical care alone. In 1998, this clinical trial found that patients with 50%-70% stenosis had a moderate reduction in stroke and death rates, but that patients with less than 50% stenosis did not benefit from surgery.

== Honors and awards ==
In 1984 he was made an Officer of the Order of Canada and was promoted to Companion in 2003.

In 1995 he was inducted into the Canadian Medical Hall of Fame. In 2001 he was awarded an honorary Doctor of Laws degree from the University of Western Ontario, and in 2012 he was awarded an honorary Doctor of Science degree from the University of Oxford.

In 2008, he received the Karolinska Stroke Award for Excellence in Stroke Research, the first recipient outside of Europe to receive this award from the Karolinska Institute.

In 2012 he was given an Honorary DSc from Oxford University and also received honorary degrees from the University of Western Ontario, Dalhousie University, the University of Utrecht and the New York Institute of Technology.

The Heart and Stroke Foundation of Canada's Henry JM Barnett Research Scholarship Award is named in his honor.

== Personal life ==
The Medical Post – 24 August 2004

Born in Newcastle upon Tyne, England, at age 3 he came to Canada with his parents. At age 12, he skipped Sunday School one day to go for a walk along Lake Ontario and saw two men with binoculars, one of whom was Jim Bailey, a scientist at the Royal Ontario Museum. The young Henry started speaking to the men and Bailey showed him a hoary redpoll through the binoculars. He also saw a shrike who had impaled a mouse and the young lad was hooked on ornithology for life. Bailey later became a good friend of Barnett.

Henry met his wife, a nurse, Kathleen (Kay) Gourlay in medical school. They would go on weekend trips and while she drove the car: he had up to 4 sets of dictations underway, one for the Department of Neurology, one for his own research, one for the Robarts Research Institute and one for the journal Stroke. They had 4 children, and his daughter Jane married James Drake, son of neurosurgeon Dr. Charles Drake, who became a neurosurgeon like his father.

Dr. Barnett was predeceased by his wife Kay in 2006 and died in Toronto on 20 October 2016.
