= Schulich School of Medicine and Dentistry =

Medical and dental school of the University of Western Ontario

- Type: Public medical and dental school
- Established: 1881 (medical school); 1964 (dental school)
- Parent institution: University of Western Ontario
- Dean: John Yoo
- Academic staff: 1,800
- Students: 684 (MD students); 224 (DDS students); 995 (BMSc students)
- Postgraduates: 765
- Doctoral students: 273
- Location: London, Ontario, Canada; 43°00′29.84″N 81°16′18.82″W
- Named for: Seymour Schulich
- Website: schulich.uwo.ca

The Schulich School of Medicine and Dentistry is the combined medical school and dental school of the University of Western Ontario, a public university in London, Ontario, Canada.

The medical education section is one of six in Ontario and one of 17 medical schools in Canada, and the dental education section is one of two in Ontario and one of ten in Canada.

== History ==
Medical sciences building at the Schulich School of Medicine and Dentistry

The medical school at the University of Western Ontario was founded under the guidance of Bishop Isaac Hellmuth in 1881. At the time, the university was already at capacity with other departments, so most lectures were to be taken place in a small, five-room cottage. The first lecture was given on October 1, 1882. In 1888, a separate faculty building was opened on the corner of York and Waterloo in London, Ontario. The dental school was founded in 1964 and the first classes started in 1966. The two schools merged in 1997. The school is the seventh oldest in Canada, and the third in Ontario after Toronto's and Queen's medical schools. Schulich Medical School is based in London, with an undergraduate medical campus in Windsor. It consistently ranks as one of the top medical schools in Canada.

The school emphasizes a patient-centered approach to medicine, introducing new students to clinical methods in the first few weeks. Schulich has consistently done well in residency matches, with the fourth highest match rate in Canada in 2012 (95.9%). The school has produced a number of notable alumni, including the discoverer of Barr bodies Murray Barr, "the Father of Family Medicine" Ian McWhinney, and the former Director-general of the World Health Organization (WHO) Margaret Chan.

Like other Canadian medical schools, admission to Schulich School of Medicine is highly competitive. The school receives more than ten times as many applications as there are places available. For the 2012/2013 cycle, Schulich received 14 applications for each available place with an acceptance rate of less than 7%.

The school is named after Seymour Schulich who donated $26 million in 2004 to the university. This was the largest donation ever received by the university, at the time.

== MD Admissions ==
The Doctor of Medicine (MD) program at the Schulich School of Medicine and Dentistry receives approximately 2000 applications each year, of which 450 applicants are invited to interview for 171 spots (133 London campus and 38 Windsor campus). Schulich Medicine is unique in that it does not require prerequisite courses, thus encouraging students from a variety of disciplines to apply. Furthermore, no preference or advantage is given to specific programs. Schulich Medicine does not accept international students for the undergraduate program, but does accept students from provinces outside of Ontario.

=== Minimum requirements ===
Applicants are invited to interview based on minimum grade point average (GPA) and Medical College Admission Test (MCAT) requirements. For the 2023-2024 application cycle, these minimums were a 3.70 GPA. Minimum score in each of the following sections of: BBFLS 127, CPBS 127, CARS 127, PSBB 126 on the MCAT. These cutoffs vary year to year based on the applicant pool. Students whose scores below any of the cut-offs are not considered and will automatically not receive an invitation to an interview. Students from Southwestern Ontario are required to have the same academic credentials, but are allowed to have slightly lower MCAT scores for individual sections (no lower than 125/section). It is unknown if these students receive an advantage post-interview, as Schulich Medicine does not disclose their admission calculations. Furthermore, credentials for the matriculating class are not released to the public, but have been historically higher than the minimum requirements.

== DDS Admissions ==
Admission to the Doctor of Dental Surgery (DDS) program at the Schulich School of Medicine and Dentistry is highly competitive, with the school receiving approximately 485 applications each year, of which 199 are invited to interview and 56 are offered admission.

=== Admissions Statistics ===
As of 2023, the incoming DDS class of 2026 consists of 55% female and 43% male students. 11% identify as LGBTQ and 53% are first-generation Canadians. The mean GPA on admission is 3.9 and the mean DAT reading comprehension and perceptual ability scores are 21. 28% of the incoming class completed a graduate degree prior to gaining admission to the DDS program.

== Degrees offered ==
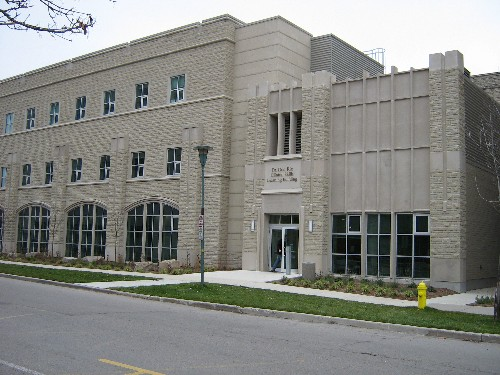
The Dr. Don Rix Clinical Learning Centre at Schulich School of Medicine and Dentistry.

=== Medicine (MD) ===
The school's medical program consists of four years of studies; two of which are pre-clerkship, one is a rotating clerkship and the final year is an integration and consolidation year devoted to electives in preparation for the chosen speciality of the student.

=== Dentistry (DDS) ===
The school's dentistry program is a four-year program offering a Doctor of Dental Surgery (DDS) degree. The school also offers Canada's first accredited Qualifying Program for Internationally Trained Dentists (ITD), as well as a post-graduate programs in Clinical Orthodontics.

=== Medical science (BMSc) ===
The medical science undergraduate program is a joint program offered by the Schulich School of Medicine and Dentistry and the University of Western Ontario.

=== Full list of degree programs offered ===
- Doctor of Medicine (MD)
- Doctor of Dental Surgery (DDS)
- 48 postgraduate medicine (residency) training programs
- Bachelor of Medical Sciences (BMSc)
- MSc & PhD programs in basic and clinical sciences
- Combined MD/PhD
- Combined MD/DDS (Oral & Maxillofacial Surgery Residency)
- Graduate Orthodontics
- Qualifying Program (for foreign-trained dental graduates)

== Research ==
Undergraduate medical and dental students have the opportunity to conduct basic or clinical research under the supervision of a Schulich faculty member in the London or Windsor area. There are two main programs: Summer Research Training Program (SRTP) and Schulich Research Opportunities Program (SROP).

=== Summer Research Training Program ===
The goal of the SRTP program is to introduce medical students to basic or clinical research and stimulate their interest in academic medicine. Students pursue a medical research project during the summer months for two years prior to clerkship. Dental students have similar opportunities. A two-year commitment is mandatory for medical students to fully develop the project; as such, only first year student may apply to the program. However, for dental students such two year commitment is not obliged. Approximately 10-15 students are selected to enter these programs, depending on the feasibility of the project and the availability of funds. The Schulich School of Medicine and Dentistry provides funding for the student equal to the current Canadian Institutes of Health Research (CIHR) Summer Studentship rate.

Medical students are required to attend weekly seminars during five of the ten summer months, where they listen to and critique other projects. An interim report is required at the end of the first summer, and students are required to present their final results at the SRTP Student Symposium at the end of the second summer. Students are also eligible for awards at the completion of the program. Historically, students have been successful in producing publications and conference abstracts.

Proposed projects are made available online each January. Students are invited to review the projects, contact faculty, and apply to the program. Applications are due in February, with funding decisions finalized in March.

=== COVID-19 pandemic ===
During the COVID-19 pandemic, faculty and students of the school have engaged in research to advance candidate vaccines and other topics related to the virus. Funding for this research came from the Canadian Institutes of Health Research, Natural Sciences and Engineering Research Council, Social Sciences and Humanities Research Council, International Development Research Centre and Genome Canada.

- Communications - Researcher Anita Kothari and Nursing professor Lorie Donelle received a $129,600 grant in March 2020 to develop a social media toolkit to assist public health officials in communication information to the public during a viral outbreak, as well as to study social media's role in the spread of misinformation.
- Vaccines and therapeutics - Health Studies professor and Health Ethics, Law, & Policy (HELP) Lab co-director Maxwell Smith received a $283,656 grant in March 2020 to support expedited research and development of COVID-19 vaccines and treatments for the disease. Later that month an additional $998,840 was awarded to a team led by Schulich researchers Eric Arts, Stephen Barr, Chil-Yong Kang, and Ryan Troyer to "establish and test" a vaccine candidate against SARS-CoV-2, and to develop a "vaccine bank" to store vaccines for deployment against another coronavirus outbreak.

== Affiliated teaching hospitals ==
Schulich School of Medicine and Dentistry affiliated teaching hospitals
Institution	Main specialties	Affiliated research arm
Children's Hospital at London Health Sciences Centre	Medical imaging, neurosciences, oncology	Children's Health Foundation
University Hospital (London Health Sciences Centre)	Anesthesiology, medical imaging, multi organ transplantation, neurosciences, oncology	Lawson Health Research Institute
Victoria Hospital (London Health Sciences Centre)	Anesthesiology, medical imaging, multi organ transplantation, neurosciences	Canadian National Institute for the Blind
St. Joseph's Hospital (St. Joseph's Health Care London)	Breast care, diabetes, ear, nose and throat/head and neck surgery, eye care, gastroenterology, hand and upper limb, lung disease, osteoporosis, pain management, rheumatology, urology	The St. Joseph's Health Care Foundation
Parkwood Hospital (St. Joseph's Health Care London)	Complex care, palliative care, rehabilitation, specialized geriatric services	The St. Joseph's Health Care Foundation
Regional Mental Health Care (St. Joseph's Health Care London)	Mental healthcare	
Mount Hope Centre for Long-Term Care (St. Joseph's Health Care London)	Mental healthcare, palliative care	The St. Joseph's Health Care Foundation

== Notable faculty and alumni ==
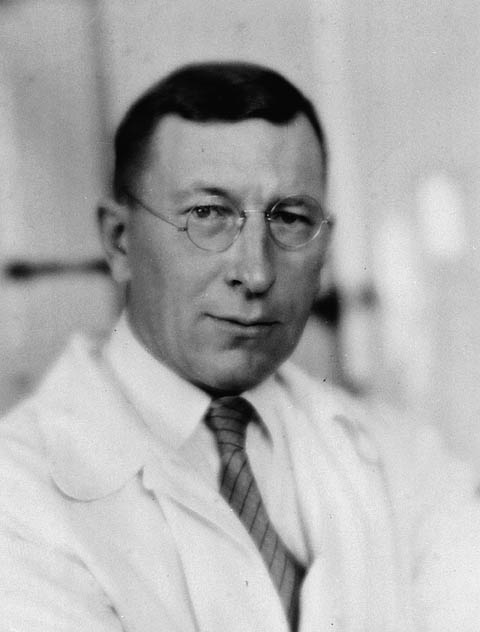
Frederick Banting, primary discoverer of insulin

Since their founding, the medical and dental schools have produced a number of famous physicians and inventors, including:

- Frederick Banting: Surgeon; primary discoverer of insulin; lecturer in orthopedics and anthropology (1920–1921)
- Margaret Chan: Former Director-General of the World Health Organization (WHO)

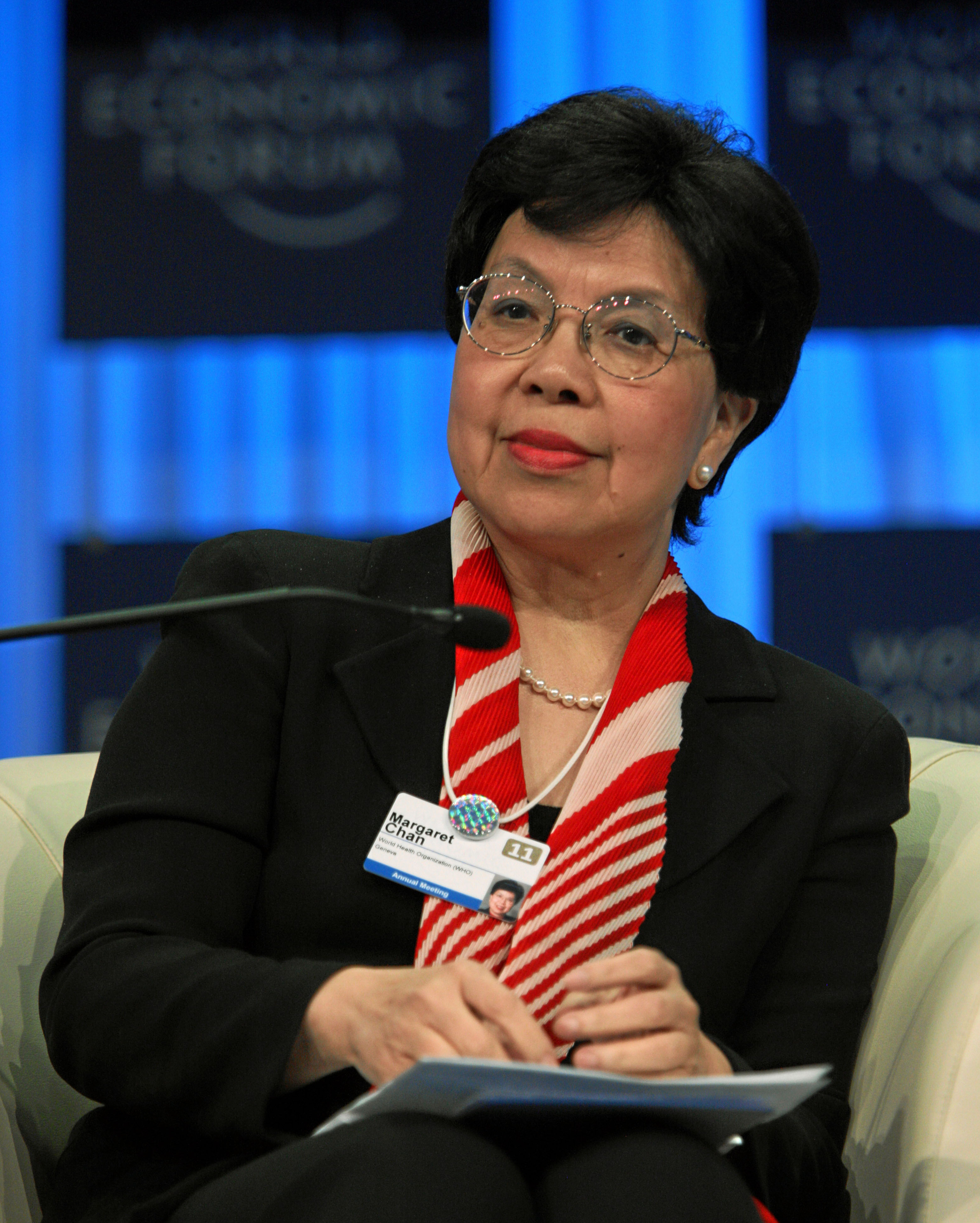
Margaret Chan, Director-General of the World Health Organization (WHO)

- Jane Philpott: Current Minister of Health and Member of Parliament for Markham-Stouffville
- Henry J.M. Barnett: Neurologist; expert in the medical management of stroke; along with Charles Drake, co-founder of the Department of Clinical Neurological Sciences at University Hospital (London)
- Rolando Del Maestro — Italian-Canadian neurosurgeon and pioneer in "awake brain surgery"
- Charles G. Drake: Neurosurgeon; established the University of Western Ontario as a neurosurgical centre of excellence; pioneered treatment of vertebral basilar aneurysms
- Gary G. Ferguson: Neurosurgeon; internationally recognized as a leader on research in stroke prevention surgery
- Ian McWhinney: Family physician; known as the "Father of Family Medicine"; established the Centre for Studies in Family Medicine, often regarded as the premier research centre in Family Medicine in Canada
- David Jaffray: a pioneer in medical imaging and professor at the University of Toronto

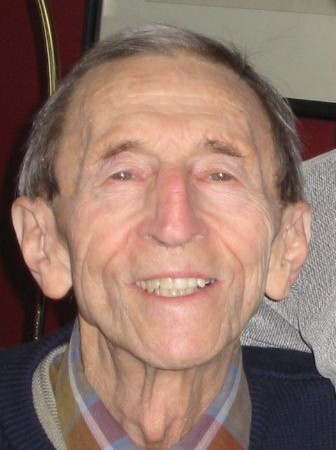
Ian McWhinney, known as "father of family medicine"

- Henri Breault: Chief of Pediatrics and Director of the Poison Control Centre at Hotel Dieu Hospital; he was instrumental in the creation of the first child-proof container
- Robert Noble: involved in the discovery of vinblastine
- Murray Barr: discovered an important cell structure named after him: Barr body, an inactive X chromosome in a female somatic cell, rendered inactive by lyonization
- Gopal Bhatnagar: Head of Cardiovascular Surgery unit at the Trillium Health Centre; he led the team that performed the first cardiopulmonary bypass surgery in Canada in 2004 using the new Sorin mini-bypass technology
- Jock McKeen: co-founder of the Haven Institute (Gabriola Island, Canada) with Bennet Wong
- John David Spence: Medical researcher and professor at the University of Western Ontario
- Paul Polak: co-founder and CEO of Windhorse International
- A. Albert Yuzpe: obstetrician-gynecologist; known for his work on human fertility and emergency contraception. The Yuzpe regimen, is named after him
- Barry A. Love: cardiologist; director of the Congenital Cardiac Catheterization Laboratory and director of the Pediatric Electrophysiology Service at the Mount Sinai Medical Center and assistant professor of both pediatrics and cardiology at the Mount Sinai School of Medicine
- Jonathan Larmonth Meakins:surgeon, expert in immunobiology and surgical infections; the fourth person and first Canadian appointed Nuffield Professor of Surgery Professor at University of Oxford. He is a Fellow of Balliol College, Oxford and leads the Nuffield Department Surgery
- William James Roche: Canadian politician and Conservative Member of Parliament
- Donald Rix: pathologist and philanthropist
- Thomas Chisholm: lecturer
- Melanie Kok: Olympic Canadian rower
- James Collip: dean of medicine at the University of Western Ontario, and part of the Toronto group which isolated insulin
- Lawrence Sealewyn Holmes: dermatologist and radiologist; noted philatelist
- John G. Kelton: dean of medicine at McMaster University Medical School and the McMaster Faculty of Health Sciences, developed a diagnostic test for heparin-induced thrombocytopenia
- Danielle Martin: Canadian physician, health care administrator, author and an associate professor at the University of Toronto.

== See also ==
=== Books ===
- Murray Llewellyn Barr 'A century of medicine at Western: a centennial history of the Faculty of Medicine, University of Western Ontario' (London: University of Western Ontario, 1977)
- John R. W. Gwynne-Timothy 'Western's first century' (London: University of Western Ontario, 1978)
- Ruth Davis Talman 'The beginnings and development of the University of Western Ontario, 1878–1924.' (MA Thesis, University of Western Ontario, 1925)
