= Ivar Mendez =

Canadian neurosurgeon and neuroscientist

Ivar Mendez OC
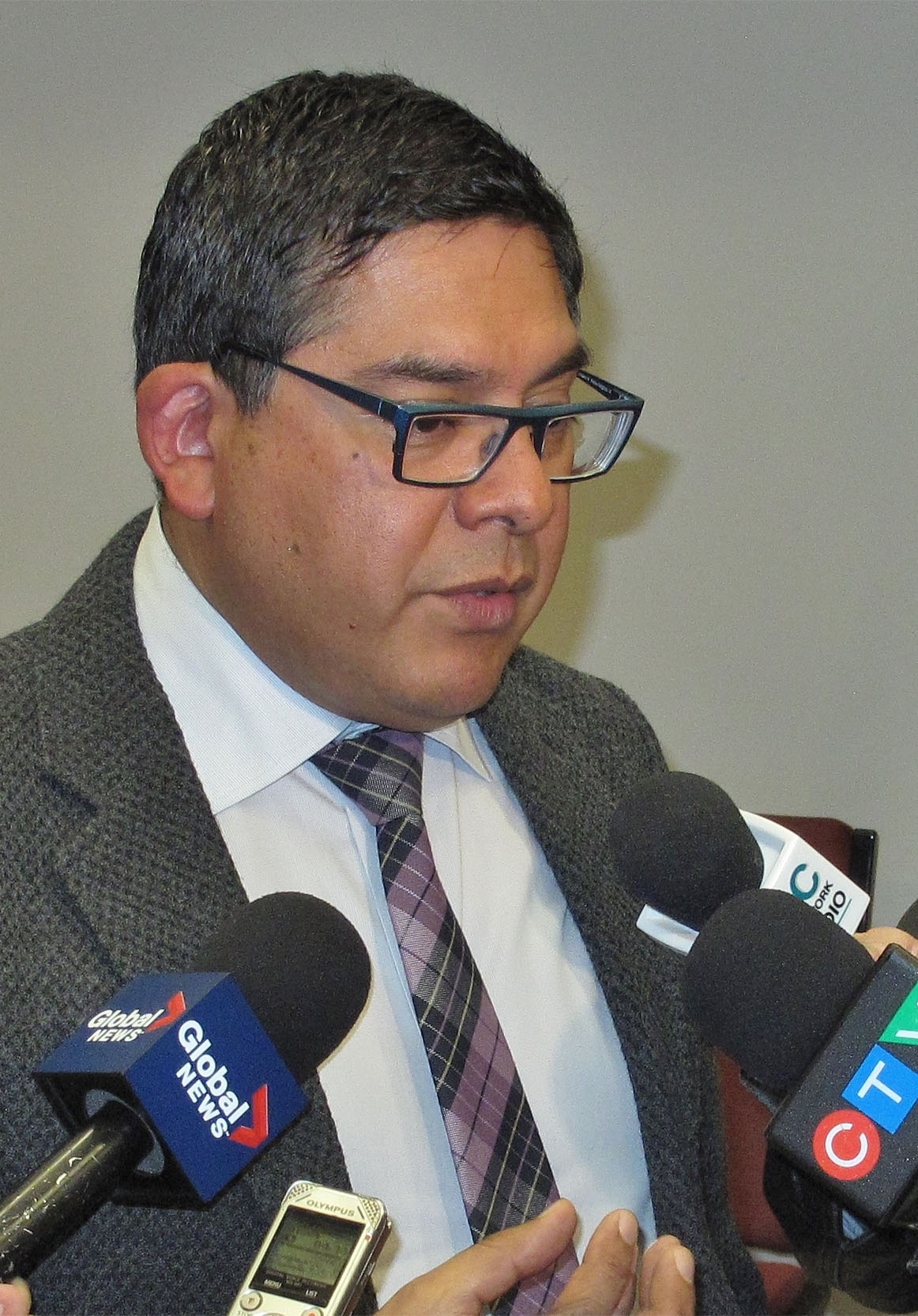
- Born: La Paz, Bolivia
- Education: University of Western Ontario, University of Toronto
- Scientific career
- Fields: neurosurgery, neuroscience, photography, sculpture, philanthropy
- Workplaces: University of Saskatchewan, Saskatoon Health Region, Dalhousie University, Queen Elizabeth II Health Sciences Centre, Brain Repair Centre, Dalhousie University Neurosurgery

Ivar Mendez OC is a Canadian neurosurgeon and neuroscientist who is a professor of surgery at the University of Saskatchewan. He is known for his work in cell transplantation for Parkinson's disease and the use of remote presence robotics in neurosurgery and primary health care. In December 2022, Mendez was appointed an officer of the Order of Canada for his pioneering work in the use of remote telemedicine and robotics to revolutionize the delivery of health and patient care. Dr. Mendez is the Director of the Virtual Health Hub.

Mendez served as the F.H. Wigmore Professor and Provincial Head of the Department of Surgery at the University of Saskatchewan and the Saskatchewan Health Authority from 2013 to 2022 for the Province of Saskatchewan. He was the head of Neurosurgery at Dalhousie University for over a decade and was the inaugural Chairman and one of the founders of the Brain Repair Centre. He is also the president and founder of the Ivar Mendez International Foundation that provides health and educational assistance to children in the Bolivian Andes. Mendez is a photographer and sculptor and has published four books of photography.

== Biography ==
Mendez was born in La Paz, Bolivia and immigrated with his family to Canada as a teenager. He obtained a BSc degree from the University of Toronto and then an M.D. from the University of Western Ontario (UWO). He did a neurosurgical residency training in London, and was certified in Neurosurgery from the Royal College of Physician and Surgeons of Canada in 1994 and from the American Board of Neurological Surgery in 1996. He became a fellow of the American College of Surgeons in 1998 and became a member of the College Board of Governors in 2015. His interest in regenerative medicine led him to obtain a PhD in Anatomy and Neurobiology from the UWO his PhD thesis was on "Neurotransmitter Interactions in Nigral Grafts". He did a postdoctoral fellowship at the University of Lund in Sweden under the supervision of Anders Björklund. In 2014, Saint Mary's University (Halifax) in Nova Scotia awarded Mendez a Doctor of Science (honoris causa) degree for his contribution to Neuroscience and he was inducted a Fellow to the Canadian Academy of Health Sciences. In 2016, Mendez received the Government of Canada Public Service Award of Excellence for the use of remote presence robotic technology to improve healthcare in the Canadian North. In December 2022, Mendez was appointed an officer of the Order of Canada for his pioneering work in the use of remote telemedicine and robotics to revolutionize the delivery of health and patient care in Canada and worldwide. Dr. Mendez is the Director of the Virtual Health Hub.

== Scientific contributions ==
He pioneered the technique of multiple grafts to restore dopamine input to the parkinsonian mammalian brain. This technique was translated into clinical trials in patients with Parkinson's disease and showed long-term survival of those grafts. He also pioneered the use of Glial Derived Neurotrophic Factor (GDNF) in combination with fetal cells in humans. Mendez invented a transplantation delivery system to inject cells into the human brain. With his team, he performed the first long-distance brain surgery robotic telementoring in the world by using a robotic arm to mentor neurosurgeons located 400 km away. He is also pioneering the use of remote presence devices to deliver health care in remote locations. In 2015, Mendez and his team printed the first 3D brain for planning deep brain stimulation surgery. Research in 3D brain printing led in 2016 to the development of a virtual reality (VR) brain for medical education and surgical planning applications. In 2020, Dr. Mendez and his remote presence technology team pioneered the use of telerobotic ultrasonography for abdominal and obstetric sonography. This technology was used to provide prenatal ultrasound to pregnant women living in COVID-19 outbreak communities.

== Inventions ==
- Neural transplantation delivery system: Canadian Patent #2,281,007 and US Patent #7,137,969
- Injection delivery system: US Patent #8,753,314 and US patent #9,067,028

== Humanitarian contributions ==
Mendez has established a Canadian charitable organization, the Ivar Mendez International Foundation, to provide nutrition, dental care and art program to children in remote locations of the Bolivian Andes.

== Awards ==
- Officer of the Order of Canada
- Queen Elizabeth II Platinum Jubilee Medal
- Government of Canada Public Service Award of Excellence 2016
- Queen Elizabeth II Diamond Jubilee Medal
- Humanitarian of the Year Award, Canadian Red Cross - Atlantic Region
- Ten most influential Hispanics in Canada
- Dr. John Savage Memorial Award
- Royal College Medal Award - Medalist in Surgery

== Artistic endeavours ==
He has published four books of photography and has had several exhibitions of his photography and sculpture In October 2003 He sculpted a bust of Canadian Neurosurgeon Dr. Charles Drake was installed outside the front entrance of University Hospital in London, Ontario where Drake practiced medicine. The statue was unveiled by American Actress and Singer Della Reese whose life was saved by Drake following an Aneurysm in October 1979.

== Published books ==
- Bolivia. Mendez, I. ISBN 0-920427-64-2. Glen Margaret Publishing 2006.
- Illimani. Mendez, I. ISBN 978-1-897462-17-1. Glen Margaret Publishing 2010.
- Bolivia - 2nd Edition. Mendez, I. ISBN 978-1-897462-26-3. Glen Margaret Publishing 2012.
- Sariri. Mendez, I. ISBN 978-99954-2-936-2. SPC Impresores S.A. 2013.
- Sariri. Travels Through Bolivia. Mendez, I. ISBN 978-1-988783-79-6. ynwp (Regina, Canada). 2022.

== Selected scientific publications ==
- Mendez I, Sanchez-Pernaute R, Cooper O, et al. (July 2005). "Cell type analysis of functional fetal dopamine cell suspension transplants in the striatum and substantia nigra of patients with Parkinson's disease". Brain. 128 (Pt 7): 1498–510. doi:10.1093/brain/awh510. PMC 2610438. PMID 15872020.
- Master Z, McLeod M, Mendez I (March 2007). "Benefits, risks and ethical considerations in translation of stem cell research to clinical applications in Parkinson's disease". Journal of Medical Ethics. 33 (3): 169–73. doi:10.1136/jme.2005.013169. PMC 2598267. PMID 17329391.
- Mukhida K, Mendez I, McLeod M, et al. (November 2007). "Spinal GABAergic transplants attenuate mechanical allodynia in a rat model of neuropathic pain". Stem Cells. 25 (11): 2874–85. doi:10.1634/stemcells.2007-0326. PMID 17702982.
- Mendez I, Viñuela A, Astradsson A, et al. (May 2008). "Dopamine neurons implanted into people with Parkinson's disease survive without pathology for 14 years". Nature Medicine. 14 (5): 507–9. doi:10.1038/nm1752. PMC 2656682. PMID 18391961.
- Mukhida K, Hong M, Miles GB, et al. (August 2008). "A multitarget basal ganglia dopaminergic and GABAergic transplantation strategy enhances behavioural recovery in parkinsonian rats". Brain. 131 (Pt 8): 2106–26. doi:10.1093/brain/awn149. PMID 18669492.
- Cooper O, Astradsson A, Hallett P, Robertson H, Mendez I, Isacson O (2009). "Lack of functional relevance of isolated cell damage in transplants of Parkinson's disease patients". Journal of Neurology. 256 (Suppl 3): 310–316. CiteSeerX 10.1.1.407.8657. doi:10.1007/s00415-009-5242-z. PMID 19711122. S2CID 16653812.
- Mendez I, Jong M, Keays-White D, Turner G (2013). "The use of remote presence for health care delivery in a northern Inuit community: a feasibility study". International Journal of Circumpolar Health. 72 (72) 21112. doi:10.3402/ijch.v72i0.21112. PMC 3753140. PMID 23984292.
- Mendez I, Van den Hof M (November 19, 2013). "Mobile remote-presence devices for point-of-care health care delivery". Canadian Medical Association Journal. 185 (17): 1512–6. doi:10.1503/cmaj.120223. PMC 3832559. PMID 23775612.
- Mendez I, Song M, Chiasson P, Bustamante L (2013). "Point-of-Care Programming for Neuromodulation: A Feasibility Study Using Remote Presence". Neurosurgery. 72 (1): 99–108. doi:10.1227/NEU.0b013e318276b5b2. PMID 23096417.
- Hallett P, Cooper O, Sadi D, Robertson H, Mendez I, Isacson O (26 June 2014). "Long-term health of dopaminergic neuron transplants in Parkinson's disease patients". Cell Reports. 7 (6): 1755–1761. doi:10.1016/j.celrep.2014.05.027. PMC 4105701. PMID 24910427.
- Ekstrand, C; Jamal, A; Nguyen, R; Kudryk, A; Mann, J; Mendez, I (March 2018). "Immersive and Interactive Virtual Reality to Improve Learning and Retention of Neuroanatomy in Medical Students: A Randomized Controlled Study". CMAJ Open. 6 (1): E103–E109. doi:10.9778/cmajo.20170110. PMC 5878950. PMID 29510979.
- Adams, Scott; Burbridge, Brent; Obaid, Haron; Stoneham, Grant; Babyn, Paul; Mendez, Ivar (2020). "Telerobotic Sonography for Remote Diagnostic Imaging". J Ultrasound Med. 9999 (7): 1287–1306. doi:10.1002/jum.15525.
- Adams, Scott; Burbridge, Brent; Chatterson, Leslie; McKinney, Veronica; Babyn, Paul; Mendez, Ivar (October 2020). "Telerobotic Ultrasound to Provide Obstetrical Ultrasound Services Remotely During the COVID-19 Pandemic". Journal of Telemedicine and Telecare. 28 (8): 568–576. doi:10.1177/1357633X20965422. PMC 7576332. PMID 33076753.
- Adams, Scott; Burbridge, Brent; Obaid, Haron; Stoneham, Grant; Babyn, Paul; Mendez, Ivar (July 2021). "Telerobotic Sonography for Remote Diagnostic Imaging: Narrative Review of Current Developments and Clinical Applications". Journal of Ultrasound in Medicine. 40 (7): 1287–1306. doi:10.1002/jum.15525.
- Adams, Scott J.; Babyn, Paul; Burbridge, Brent; Tang, Rachel; Mendez, Ivar (August 2021). "Access to Ultrasound Imaging: A Qualitative Study in Two Northern, Remote, Indigenous Communities in Canada". International Journal of Circumpolar Health. 80 (1). doi:10.1080/22423982.2021.1961392. PMC 8344228. PMID 34347560.
- Adams, Scott; Burbridge, Brent; Chatterson, Leslie; Babyn, Paul; Mendez, Ivar (2022). "A Telerobotic Ultrasound Clinic Model of Ultrasound Service Delivery to Improve Access to Imaging in Rural and Remote Communities". Journal of the American College of Radiology. 19: 162–171. doi:10.1016/j.jacr.2021.07.023.
- Adams, S. J.; Penz, E.; Imeah, B.; Burbridge, B.; Obaid, H.; Babyn, P.; Mendez, I (January 2023). "Economic Evaluation of Telerobotic Ultrasound Technology to Remotely Provide Ultrasound Services in Rural and Remote Communities". Journal of Ultrasound in Medicine. 42 (1): 109–123. doi:10.1002/jum.16070. PMID 35906950.
