= John Spence =

John Spence may refer to:

- John Spence (frogman) (1918–2013), American World War II veteran, first American combat frogman
- John Spence (musician) (1969–1987), founding member of the band No Doubt
- John Spence (politician) (1920–1986), British Conservative MP 1970–1986
- John Spence (sailor) (1875–1946), British sailor, won silver medal at 1908 Summer Olympics
- John Spence (scientist) (1929–2013), Trinidadian botanist and politician
- John C. Spence (artist) (1830-1890), a stained-glass artist and painter in Montreal, Canada
- John C. H. Spence (1946–2021), Richard Snell Professor of Physics at Arizona State University
- John S. Spence (1788–1840), American Senator from Maryland
- John Selby Spence (bishop) (1909–1973)
- John David Spence (born 1944), Canadian medical doctor, medical researcher and professor
- John Brodie Spence (c. 1824–1902), banker and politician in South Australia
- John Spence (footballer), footballer for Sunderland
- John Spence (zoo director), South Africa
- John P. Spence (politician) (1905-1981) Ontario politician
- John Spence (entrepreneur), a British-born founder and chairman of the Karma Group

== See also ==
- Johnnie Spence (1936–1977), British musical director
- Jonathan Spence (1936–2021), British-born historian
- John Spence Community High School, a secondary school in Preston, Tyne and Wear, England
- John Spencer (disambiguation)
