= War Memorial Children's Hospital =

War Memorial Children's Hospital may refer to the following children's hospitals:

- Children's Hospital at London Health Sciences Centre (known as War Memorial Children's Hospital from 1917 to 1985), London, Ontario, Canada
- Red Cross War Memorial Children's Hospital, Cape Town, Western Cape, South Africa
