= Opeolu Adeoye =

American physician

Opeolu Makanju Adeoye
- Education: University of Maryland, Baltimore County; University of Pittsburgh School of Medicine
- Scientific career
- Institutions: Washington University in St. Louis; University of Cincinnati Academic Health Center

Opeolu Makanju Adeoye is an American physician who is the BJC HealthCare Distinguished Professor of Emergency Medicine and department chair at the Washington University School of Medicine. He was elected Fellow of the National Academy of Medicine in 2022.

== Early life and education ==
Adeoye was an undergraduate student at the University of Maryland, Baltimore County (UMBC), where he majored in biochemistry. His father had a stroke at the age of 45 and his mother died from colorectal cancer at 40, so he became interested in medicine at a young age. He moved to the University of Pittsburgh School of Medicine for medical studies, and collaborated with Westinghouse High School to deliver a mentoring program for African-American teenagers. He also launched an educational initiative at the University of Pittsburgh School of Medicine, where he studied medical education and healthcare. He was awarded the Herbert W. Nickens scholarship. He moved to the University of Cincinnati College of Medicine for residency, where he specialized in emergency medicine.

== Research and career ==
Adeoye specialized in neurosurgery and emergency medicine. He directed the Greater Cincinnati stroke centre and led the Strategies to Innovate Emergency Care Clinical Trials (SIREN) network. He studied how acute-care interventions impact the outcomes of traumatic brain injuries and strokes. He has sought to understand how bodily proteins impact the outcomes of stroke, and how the circulation of immune cells (leukocytes) is affected by the inflammatory response. In 2018, he was awarded a $30 million grant from the National Institutes of Health to study the effectiveness of combination therapies in implementing tissue plasminogen activators. Adeoye was made chief medical officer of Sense Neuro Diagnostics, a technology that can provide information on brain function in real-time.

In 2020, Adeoye was appointed the BJC HealthCare Distinguished Professor of Emergency Medicine and elected chair of the department at Washington University in St. Louis. He was elected fellow of both the National Academy of Medicine and the American Society for Clinical Investigation in 2022.

== Selected publications ==
- William J Powers; Alejandro A Rabinstein; Teri Ackerson; et al. (24 January 2018). "2018 Guidelines for the Early Management of Patients With Acute Ischemic Stroke: A Guideline for Healthcare Professionals From the American Heart Association/American Stroke Association". Stroke. ISSN 0039-2499. PMID 29367334. Wikidata Q49789131. (erratum)
- Opeolu Adeoye; Richard Hornung; Pooja Khatri; Dawn Kleindorfer (2 June 2011). "Recombinant tissue-type plasminogen activator use for ischemic stroke in the United States: a doubling of treatment rates over the course of 5 years". Stroke. 42 (7): 1952–1955. doi:10.1161/STROKEAHA.110.612358. ISSN 0039-2499. PMC 4114342. PMID 21636813. Wikidata Q33966207.
- Joseph P Broderick; Opeolu Adeoye; Jordan Elm (16 June 2017). "Evolution of the Modified Rankin Scale and Its Use in Future Stroke Trials". Stroke. 48 (7): 2007–2012. doi:10.1161/STROKEAHA.117.017866. ISSN 0039-2499. PMC 5552200. PMID 28626052. Wikidata Q38669629.
