= Cheryl Forchuk =

Professor of mental health and ageing

- Born: Canada
- Education: University of Toronto; Wayne State University; University of Windsor
- Known for: Mental health and nursing
- Scientific career
- Fields: Nursing
- Workplaces: Lawson Health Research Institute, Canada
- Thesis: (1992)

Cheryl Forchuk OC OOnt is a professor of mental health and aging at the Lawson Health Research Institute, Canada.

== Early life ==
Forchuk studied Psychology and Nursing at the University of Windsor from 1972-1976. In 1980, she received a master's degree in nursing from the University of Toronto. In 1992, she received a Ph.D. degree in nursing from Wayne State University, USA.

== Career ==
Forchuk joined University of Western Ontario, London Health Sciences Centre, as a nurse specialist/nurse scientist and associate professor in 1994. In 2009, she became an assistant director at Lawson Health Research Institute and Associate Director Nursing Research at Western University. Currently, she is distinguished university professor at the Faculty of Health Sciences at University of Western Ontario. and the Beryl and Richard Ivey Research Chair in Aging, Mental Health, Rehabilitation and Recovery.

== Awards ==
Forchuk was elected fellow of the Canadian Academy of Health Sciences in 2015. She was awarded the Order of Ontario in 2017 for her contributions to addressing issues on mental health, poverty and homelessness. In 2020, she received the Hellmuth Prize.

In 2025, she was awarded as an Officer of the Order of Canada.

== Personal life ==
She lives in Brantford, Ontario.
