= CHWO =

CHWO may stand for:

- Children's Hospital of Western Ontario, now known as the Children's Hospital at London Health Sciences Centre
- CHWO, a radio station in the Greater Toronto Area that now has the call sign CFZM.
