= John David Spence =

Canadian physician

- Born: November 10, 1944 (age 81); Peru, Talara
- Died: August 10, 2025 (aged 80); London, Ontario
- Occupations: Neurologist, Internist and Clinical Pharmacologist
- Known for: Father of carotid plaque measurement

John David Spence CM (born November 10, 1944) was a Canadian medical doctor, medical researcher and Professor Emeritus at the University of Western Ontario. He was affiliated with the University of Western Ontario (where he taught Clinical Neurological Science) and the Robarts Research Institute, one of Canada's leading medical research organizations. Before his retirement from clinical practice in July 2022, he was also affiliated with the London Health Sciences Centre's University Hospital (where he set up and ran stroke prevention clinics). He was a recognized expert in stroke prevention and stroke prevention research, with more than 600 peer-reviewed publications since 1970. He delivered more than 600 lectures on stroke prevention in 42 countries. In 2015, he received the Research Excellence Award from the Canadian Society for Atherosclerosis, Thrombosis and Vascular Biology. In 2019, he was appointed a Member of the Order of Canada, and in 2020 he received the William Feinberg Award from the American Heart Association for excellence in clinical stroke research.

Dr. Spence was the director of the Stroke Prevention & Atherosclerosis Research Centre (SPARC), a unit of the Robarts Research Institute. With Maria Dicicco, RVT, he pioneered the measurement of total plaque area (TPA) in a patient's carotid artery using ultrasound technology. The ability to measure TPA gives doctors the ability to treat, and measure the change in, the amount of plaque in a patient's arteries and has given researchers the ability to measure the effectiveness of new drug treatment therapies for stroke prevention in high-risk patients with narrowing of the carotid arteries, the process of "Treating Arteries" was associated with a >80% reduction in the 2-year risk of strokes and heart attacks. Dr. Spence was recognized as "The Father of Total Plaque Area Measurement" and the importance of TPA measurement is that, in Dr Spence's words, "We can now treat arteries instead of just treating risk factors".

== Spence - Key Research Discoveries ==
Cerebral consequences of hypertension: treating high blood pressure prevents only arteriolar strokes. (.) This research led to the understanding that the effects of therapies, designed to reduce hypertension, on blood pressure need to be distinguished from other effects on atherosclerosis.

Effects of antihypertensive drugs on blood velocity and arterial flow disturbances 1976, 1980, 1995: these studies showed that antihypertensive drugs have different effects on blood velocity and arterial flow disturbances, which have implications for how effective they are at fighting the buildup of arterial plaque. (.)

Effects of grapefruit juice on drug metabolism: The discovery with Drs. David Bailey and Malcolm Arnold, that grapefruit juice markedly increases blood levels of a number of drugs that have low bioavailability because of gut wall first-pass metabolism by CYP3A4 made a major contribution to the understanding of pharmacokinetics, and has opened up a new field of pharmacology..

Ultrasound measurement of plaque: Beginning in 1990, Dr. Spence pioneered the use of carotid plaque measurement (as opposed to intima-media thickness) for research and for management of patients with carotid artery disease. (.). This has evolved to the use of 3-D plaque volume measurements for evaluation of new therapies. The effect of drug therapies on carotid plaque volume can now be evaluated in a very cost-effective way.

Development of quantitative traits for human atherosclerosis: Spence developed a number of quantitative traits that will advance the search for new genetic causes of atherosclerosis, and thus new therapeutic targets and new therapies for atherosclerosis. These are unexplained atherosclerosis and its progression, unexplained protection from atherosclerosis and unexplained regression of atherosclerosis. (;.)

Appropriate carotid endarterectomy: Showed in 2005 that with intensive medical therapy most patients with asymptomatic carotid stenosis cannot benefit from endarterectomy or stenting, and that the very small proportion (10%) who may benefit can be identified by microembolus detection on transcranial Doppler. Showed in 2010 that the proportion who could benefit had declined with more intensive therapy to less than 5%. SPARC's work was confirmed in 2010 by an international multicenter study, the ACES study. Dr. Spence led a study in the Canadian Atherosclerosis Imaging Network, on histological validation of imaging features of vulnerable plaque that will also serve to identify high-risk carotid plaques.

Physiologically individualized therapy for resistant hypertension. Reported in 2017 that in patients in three hypertension clinics in Africa, measuring plasma renin activity and aldosterone markedly improved blood pressure control, but permitting selection of the treatment that is appropriate to that patient, by identifying the physiological cause of the hypertension.

Effects of the intestinal microbiome on atherosclerosis He reported with colleagues in 2018 that patients with carotid atherosclerosis not explained by traditional risk factors had higher blood levels of toxic metabolites produced by intestinal bacteria from foods such as red meat and egg yolk. His group also found that blood levels of those toxic products are elevated with even moderate impairment of kidney function, such as seen in elderly patients. This has important implications for diet, and offers the possibility of an entirely new way of treating atherosclerosis: repopulation of the intestinal microbiome.

== Special Projects ==
1. Member of the "Joint Stroke Working Group" set up by the Ministry of Health and the Heart and Stroke Foundation.
2. Member of the Shape Task Force II which is recognized in the U.S. Centers of Excellence program in their work for heart attack prevention and eradication.
3. National stroke prevention program of the Argentina health organization training Argentinean physicians in vascular prevention.

== Education and Training ==
1. Ridley College.
2. M.D. University of Western Ontario.
3. Clinical Pharmacology training at the Cardiovascular Research Institute of the University of California at San Francisco.
4. M.B.A. from the University of Toronto.
5. Trained with Henry J. M. Barnett at University Hospital in London Ontario. Dr. Barnett is a leading stroke researcher who pioneered the use of aspirin in stroke prevention therapy.

== Personal life ==
Spence was the great-grandson of David Spence (Canadian Politician) and trained with Henry J. M. Barnett
