= Victoria Hospital (London, Ontario) =

- South West Local Health Integration Network
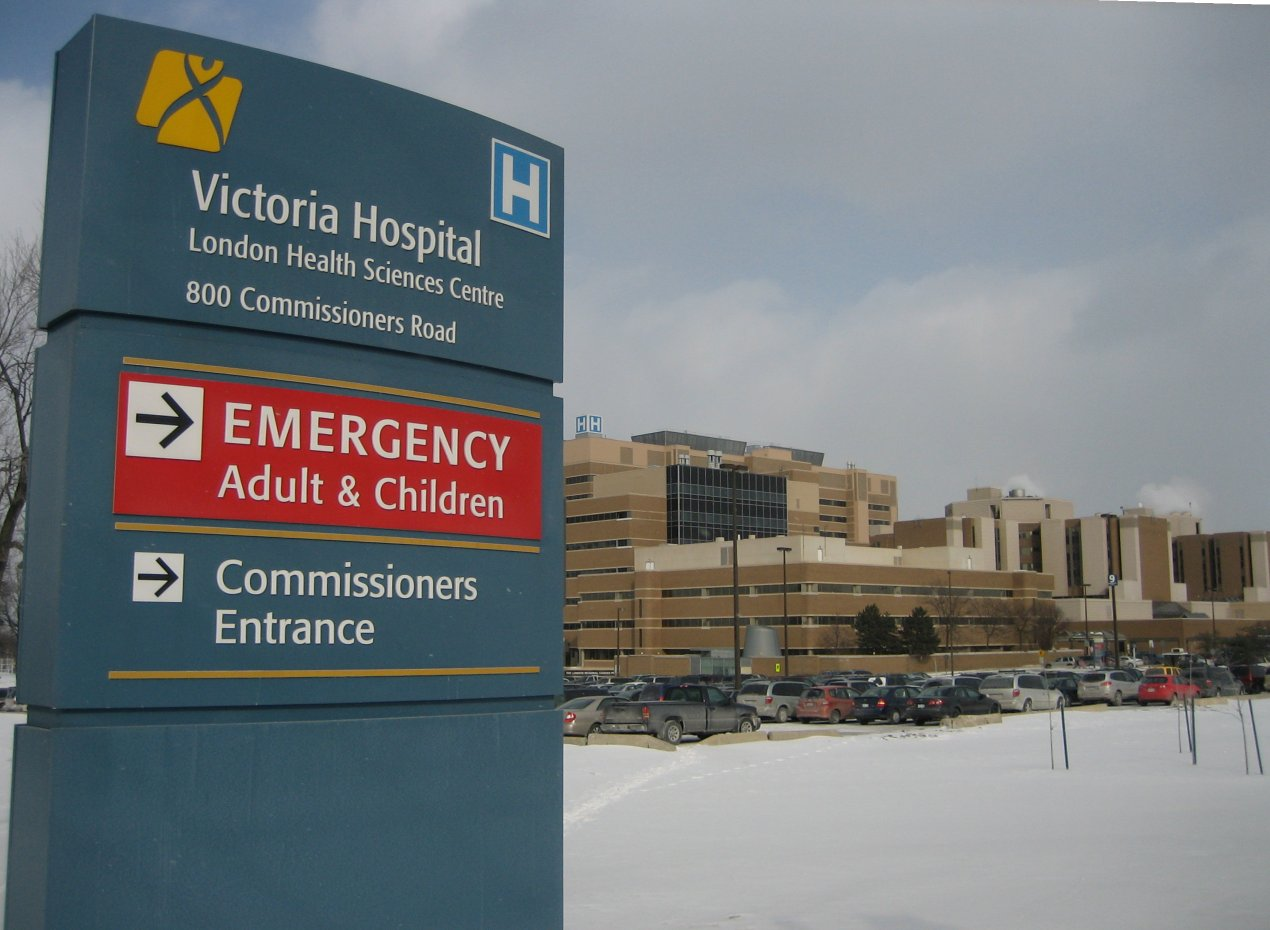
- Victoria Hospital

- Location in Ontario

Geography
- Location: 800 Commissioners Road East; London, Ontario; N6A 5W9
- Coordinates: 42.9592°N 81.2256°W

Organisation
- Care system: Medicare
- Type: Teaching
- Affiliated university: Schulich School of Medicine & Dentistry

Services
- Emergency department: Level I Trauma Centre
- Beds: 559
- Speciality: Multiple

Helipads
- Helipad: TC LID: CPW2

History
- Founded: 1874

Links
- Website: www.lhsc.on.ca

Victoria Hospital, in London, Ontario, Canada, is a large teaching hospital affiliated with the University of Western Ontario. Along with University Hospital it is part of the London Health Sciences Centre, which itself is the Lead Trauma Hospital of the Southwestern Local Health Integration Network.

London's first hospital was housed in a log cabin on the military barracks at Victoria Park, constructed in 1838. The aging hospital was replaced in 1875 by the London General Hospital, constructed on a new site in the city's south end. Pressure on the new hospital from the city's growing population led to a much larger hospital being constructed adjacent to London General Hospital, which was renamed in 1899 for the Diamond Jubilee of Queen Victoria. The hospital building was demolished and a larger building constructed on the same site in 1939, and three expansions were added up to 1967.

The Victoria Hospital Corporation acquired a federally operated military hospital in 1977, along with 80 acres (32 ha) of land. The new site was gradually expanded and became Victoria Hospital Westminster Campus. On June 13, 2005, most patient services were transferred to the newly renamed Victoria Hospital while the original hospital was renamed South Street Hospital, and other services continued to be transferred to the new site over the next several years. South Street Hospital closed permanently in 2013 and was demolished later that year.

== History ==
=== London General Hospital ===
Victoria Hospital traces its origins to the London General Hospital, constructed to replace an aging log cabin hospital operating in Victoria Park. The site of the London General Hospital, located on Ottoway Avenue (now South Street), was dedicated in 1874. The hospital opened the next year, with 56 beds on two floors.

=== Teaching hospital ===
In 1881, the Western University in London sought to create a Faculty of Medicine but lacked an appropriate facility. The following spring, the university purchased a cottage on St. James Street near the university campus to be renovated for a classroom facility. The medical school entered into an agreement with City Council to use the hospital for medical training, in exchange for an annual fee of $5.00 per student. The first class of sixteen students began instruction on October 1, 1882. The hospital itself opened a training program for nurses the following year, making London the third city in Canada with such a program.

=== Victoria Hospital ===
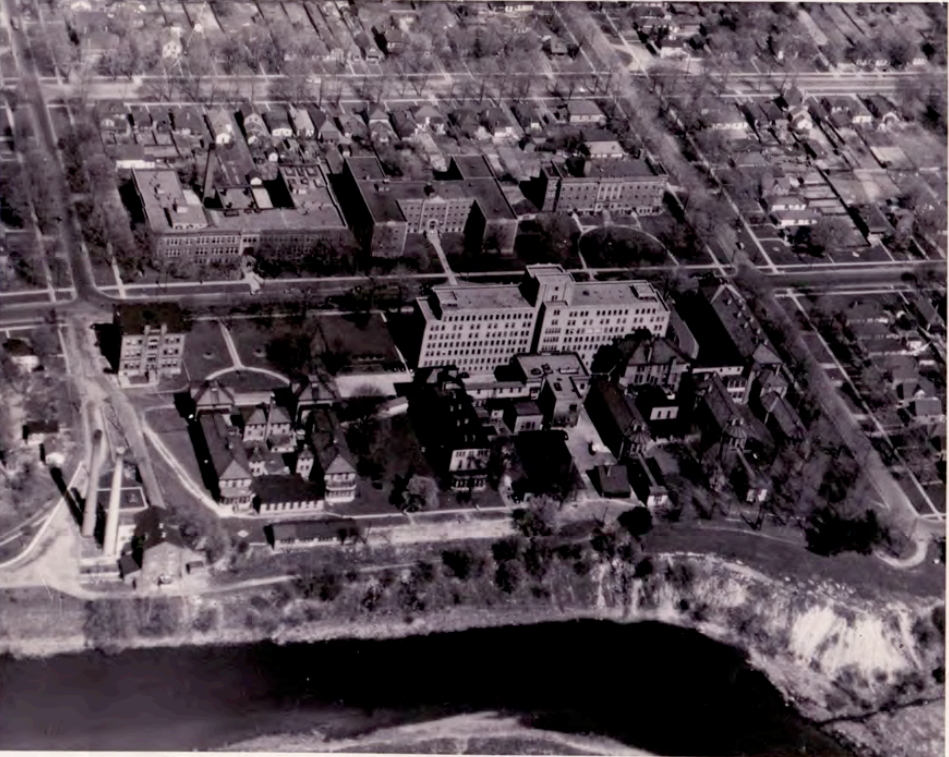
Aerial view of the former Victoria Hospital site c. 1945 on South Street. The hospital is at centre.

Growth of the city led to hospital overcrowding in the late nineteenth century. The hospital added a small expansion in 1890, however it was clear that the building would not be adequate for the city's long-term needs.

As Queen Victoria's Diamond Jubilee passed in 1897, the English monarch requested that all memorials of the event be dedicated to humanitarian purposes. The Queen's request and popularity presented an opportunity for the city to justify the cost of expanding the hospital. Throughout 1897–8, the City Council, local doctors, and public groups debated plans for construction of an expansion to the London General Hospital, or construction of a new hospital, and whether to expand on the current site or obtain land for a new hospital. In June 1898, after an election and much debate, City Council approved construction of a new 140-bed facility on the same site, at a cost of $70,000, with a plan to convert the existing hospital to a nurses' residence.

Victoria Hospital officially opened on November 16, 1899. Rooms in the new hospital's private ward were furnished by local benefactors, while public wards were furnished by a last-minute bulk purchase by the Hospital Trust from local factories. Due to lack of funds, the conversion of the old hospital was postponed indefinitely.

== See also ==
- Children's Hospital at London Health Sciences Centre, which shares facilities with Victoria Hospital
- Lawson Health Research Institute
