= Lewis Hugh Milburn =

Canadian physician and aerospace medicine specialist

Lewis Hugh Milburn (February 24, 1929 – February 24, 1992) was a Canadian physician and aerospace medicine specialist. In 1957, he became the first Black medical graduate of the University of Western Ontario's medical school, now the Schulich School of Medicine & Dentistry at Western University.

== Early life and education ==
Milburn was born in Windsor, Ontario, to Louis Milburn and Geneva Cross-Milburn. He attended Patterson Collegiate Institute in Windsor and McGill University in Montreal before graduating from medical school at the University of Western Ontario.

According to Western University, Milburn developed an interest in aviation while serving as an air cadet in Windsor. In 1947, he met Canadian flying ace Billy Bishop, who encouraged him to combine his interests in aviation and medicine by becoming a flight surgeon.

== Career ==
Milburn graduated from the University of Western Ontario medical school in 1957. Western University identifies him as the first Black student to graduate from the medical school.

After graduation, Milburn joined the United States Air Force as a flight surgeon. Western University reported that he later became the first Black Canadian flight surgeon and rose to become deputy director of aerospace medicine in the U.S. Air Force.

During the 1960s, Milburn held several aerospace-medicine posts, including Deputy Commander of the 820th Medical Group Aerospace Medical Service, Deputy Hospital Commander at Torrejón Air Base in Madrid, Spain, and Director of the 869th Medical Group Aero Medical Service. The Windsor Star reported that his military work took him to Spain and Africa, and that his humanitarian work in Africa earned him a commendation from the United States secretary of state. His death notice stated that in 1963 he received a Humanitarian Medical Commendation Medal from Secretary of State Dean Rusk for humanitarian relief work in Africa.

The Windsor Star also reported that Milburn declined a post as chief flight surgeon for the NASA space program, attributed to President Lyndon B. Johnson, because of his parents' illness, and returned to the Windsor–Detroit area to practise medicine.

Milburn later practised medicine in Detroit. He served on the staffs of Harper Grace Hospital and Detroit Riverview Hospital. He was a diplomate of the American Board of Psychiatry and Neurology and was licensed to practise in Ontario, Michigan, New York, California, Connecticut and Vermont. A 1972 issue of Michigan Medicine, published by the Michigan State Medical Society, listed Lewis H. Milburn, MD, as a physician in Detroit.

== Community service ==
Milburn was active in medical and community organizations in Detroit. His death notice stated that he served on the executive board of the Detroit Medical Society and was a delegate of the Wayne County Medical Society. It also stated that he received resolutions from Detroit City Council, the State of Michigan and the United States Senate, and community-service awards from the Underground Railroad Families Historical Foundation and Detroit Urban Center, the North American Black Historical Museum, and the Renaissance Detroit Mentor Foundation.

== Death ==
Milburn died at his home in Detroit on February 24, 1992, his 63rd birthday. He was survived by his wife Ada, sons David and Brent, grandson Alexander Lewis Milburn, and siblings Glynne Barnes, Dorothy White and Donald Milburn.

== Legacy ==
Western University and the Schulich School of Medicine & Dentistry have recognized Milburn as the medical school's first Black graduate. The university has described his career in medicine and aerospace medicine as an example for later generations of physicians.

== See also ==
- Black Canadians
