= Joseph Maraachli case =

Controversial case of terminal disease

Joseph Maraachli
- Born: January 22, 2010; Windsor, Ontario, Canada
- Died: September 27, 2011 (aged 1 year 8 months); Windsor, Ontario, Canada
- Parent(s): Moe and Sana Maraachli

The Joseph Maraachli case refers to an international controversy over the life of Joseph Maraachli, commonly known as Baby Joseph, a Canadian infant who was diagnosed with a rare progressive and incurable neurological disorder called Leigh's disease. After Canadian doctors refused to perform a tracheotomy, calling the procedure invasive and futile, Joseph's parents fought to have him transferred to the United States, arguing that while Joseph's disease was terminal, a tracheotomy would extend his life and allow him to die at home. After several months and efforts by American anti-abortion groups, Joseph was transferred to a Catholic hospital in St. Louis, Missouri, where the procedure was performed.

The successfully-obtained procedure extended Joseph's life for several months. Joseph died on Tuesday, September 27, 2011, at his home.

== History ==
=== Background ===
Joseph Maraachli was born on January 22, 2010. His parents, Moe Maraachli and Sana Nader, immigrated to Canada from Lebanon in the 1990s, settling in Windsor, Ontario.

In 2002, the couple's 18-month-old daughter, Zina, died from a degenerative disorder. After undergoing a tracheotomy, she was taken home and cared for by her parents for her final six months. Then when she was near death, her parents took her back to the hospital, hoping to make her as comfortable as possible.

Moe Maraachli once repaired computers, but gave up this work to take care of his wife Sana, who has lupus. The couple depended on Sana's disability payments and support from her family.

=== Beginning of medical issues ===
When Joseph was around three months old, his parents said they noticed he couldn't eat or breathe properly, and he wouldn't open his eyes or cry. In June 2010, they took him to a hospital in Michigan, a few miles away from Windsor, which is located directly on the Canada–United States border. At the Michigan hospital, he was diagnosed with a metabolic brain disease that the doctor said would make him developmentally delayed, and was treated, his health reportedly improving. However, in the car on the way back from a family trip to Toronto in October 2010, he stopped breathing, so he was rushed to an emergency room in Ingersoll and later transferred to the London Health Sciences Centre (LHSC) in London, Ontario.

=== Parents and doctors disagree ===
Tests and examinations on Joseph were carried out by eight specialists over a few weeks following his transfer to the LHSC. The doctors concluded that he was suffering from a "severe and progressively deteriorating neurological state" and was in a persistent vegetative state. They were in "unanimous agreement" that he did not have any chance of recovering and that there were no treatment options available to help him.

The parents disputed the conclusion that Joseph was in a persistent vegetative state, saying he responded to being tickled and jostled when he felt discomfort. The family wanted a tracheotomy for him, believing it would allow him to breathe on his own, and thus be taken out of the hospital so he could "die peacefully with mom, dad at home." They hoped the procedure could prolong Joseph's life by up to six months because it had extended his older sister Zina's life by six months when she was dying of the same condition. The couple also stated that, if their son was able to live longer due to the procedure, he would die "when God says he should."

The doctors at the hospital refused to perform a tracheotomy because they said it would needlessly protract Joseph's death and increase the risk of infection, pneumonia, and other complications. Since the time of Zina's tracheotomy, more had been learned about the condition, leading doctors to conclude it was not appropriate in Joseph's case. Dr. Douglas Fraser, a pediatric critical care specialist and the lead doctor handling the case, proposed that Joseph's breathing tube be removed, with the expectation that he would die soon afterward from his inability to breathe unaided. His parents refused to agree to this proposal.

=== Legal challenges ===
London Heath Services Centre directed the case to the Consent and Capacity Board of Ontario. It explained in a statement that it sought the Board's decision on "whether or not Joseph’s parents were complying with the principles for substitute decision-making under the provincial Health Care Consent Act in refusing to consent to the proposed treatment plan."

The hearing before the Board took place in January 2011. On January 22, the Board released its decision, holding that the course of action in the child's "best interests" would be "removal of the endotracheal tube without replacement, a Do Not Resuscitate order and palliative care."

The parents were ordered to consent to the removal of the breathing tube. They decided to appeal the Board's decision in the Ontario Superior Court of Justice, retaining a lawyer, Geoff Snow, through legal aid. The case was heard by Justice Helen Rady on February 17, 2011. An hour after the lawyers delivered their arguments, Justice Rady returned with her decision, upholding the Board's decision as "reasonable" and dismissing the family's appeal.

Removal of the breathing tube had been scheduled for the morning of February 18, but Rady moved the date to February 21, stating the intent of giving the family "adequate time to say their good-byes." The family was ordered to give consent for the breathing tube's removal by February 21.

On February 20, the family fired Snow, as he did not advise pursuing an appeal of Rady's ruling. With the support of Alex Schadenberg of the Euthanasia Prevention Coalition, they took on a new lawyer, Mark Handelman. The family refused to consent to the breathing tube's removal, and thus it was not removed on February 21. Handelman attempted to negotiate Joseph's transfer to the Children's Hospital of Michigan in Detroit. The Children's Hospital initially accepted the request, but later chose to reject the request after receiving the baby's medical file.

On February 28, the London Health Services Centre put out a media release, stating it was willing to transfer Joseph to his home but would remove the ventilator once he was there. Handelman confirmed that the hospital had made such an offer, but objected to its public disclosure, stating it had been presented during confidential negotiations. He said Joseph's parents had already rejected the offer prior to the media release, considering it "unacceptable."

On March 1, it was revealed that Handelman was no longer representing the family, though he did not disclose the reason. The family retained another lawyer, Claudio Martini, on March 5, and he announced the following week that they planned to file an appeal of the Superior Court decision.

=== Transfer to the United States ===
Various anti-abortion organizations such as Priests for Life, the Terri Schiavo Life & Hope Network, and the American Center for Law and Justice, among others, began helping the family and began negotiating in March 2011 with hospitals around the United States to have Joseph transferred. Priests for Life announced it had secured a jet which was standing by to immediately fly the family to any American hospital willing to care for Joseph.

On March 14, 2011, Priests for Life announced it had secured a transfer to SSM Cardinal Glennon Children's Medical Center, a non-profit Catholic hospital in St. Louis, Missouri, declaring victory in the "battle against the medical bureaucracy in Canada." Priests for Life also announced it would pay for Joseph's medical care at Cardinal Glennon.

Once Joseph was in Cardinal Glennon, Priests for Life said hospital officials were happy that Joseph was breathing mostly on his own, but the St. Louis Post-Dispatch reported that "Cardinal Glennon officials said they were 'puzzled' by those claims and said Joseph remained on a ventilator."

On March 21, 2011, doctors performed a tracheotomy on Joseph. He was expected to remain in the hospital for seven to ten days, then be transferred to a St. Louis pediatric specialty hospital, then be sent home with his family. Maraachli and Nader are an interfaith couple, being Muslim and Catholic, respectively; Maraachli said he wanted his son to be "raised in the religion of his mother."

==== Diagnosis ====
Doctors at the SSM Cardinal Glennon Children's Medical Center diagnosed Joseph with Leigh's disease, a rare neurometabolic disorder which causes the degeneration of the central nervous system. The disease is usually inherited, but no genetic link for Joseph was found after his parents were tested. The doctors at the SSM hospital said the tracheotomy they performed gave Joseph a more stable airway, extra mobility and comfort, and protected his lungs.

=== Going home ===
On April 21, 2011, Joseph was transported from the hospital in St. Louis to his home in Windsor, Ontario. Priests for Life paid for all of the medical bills incurred and the return flight home.

According to his father, at home Joseph was breathing on his own and showed signs of consciousness, such as opening his eyes or moving around in response to touch; his father also said that he thought that Joseph knew when he was holding him. Brother Paul O'Donnell, a friend of the Maraachli family, says he had seen Joseph turn his head to his father when his father spoke, and to his mother when his mother spoke, and also said he had seen him throw temper tantrums such as when his diaper was changed. At one point in the presence of a Vancouver Sun reporter, Joseph's father held out his finger and Joseph grabbed it.

With Joseph home, his father said, "I feel victorious. I feel I won and my baby's alive." O'Donnell described Joseph's condition at home as a miracle. Joseph's father said the fact that he had to travel to St. Louis to get care for his son angered him. However, the Vancouver Sun reported that he was positive about the outcome of his and others' efforts, and said he didn't think about when his son would die, but left that up to God.

=== Death ===
Joseph lived another six months after the tracheotomy, breathing on his own, and died peacefully in his sleep on September 27, 2011, at the age of 20 months. He had been living at home with his family since April 21, 2011. Frank Pavone said, "This young boy and his parents fulfilled a special mission from God. Amidst a Culture of Death where despair leads us to dispose of the vulnerable, [the Maraachli family] upheld a Culture of Life where hope leads us to welcome and care for the vulnerable."

A private funeral for Joseph was held on September 28. He was buried beside his sister Zina at a cemetery in Windsor.

=== Aftermath ===
On October 4, 2011, the Maraachlis held a press conference with the Terri Schiavo Life & Hope Network in which Moe Maraachli said he was considering a request for an investigation and a lawsuit against the Canadian doctors who refused to treat and release Joseph, noting that the family incurred over $46,000 in legal fees during the ordeal. Maraachli said he was angry at the Canadian doctors but thankful for the Cardinal Glennon "angel doctors".

Maraachli said Joseph wasn't suffering or in pain at home. Maraachli said he wants the Canadian medical system to change so that doctors are required to more seriously consider the wishes of the family of a dying family member. He said he would "go after" the Canadian doctors. Maraachli had a message for Joseph:

"I made a promise to my son: I will give you back your human rights and dignity if you pass away or not...Fly and tell God about what happened with you and about the doctor that tried to kill you. Your life touched the world."

== Impact ==
The case became a focal point for the ethical debate over the extent to which end-of-life care should be provided. The case draws many parallels to the Terri Schiavo case, where a court ordered the removal of the feeding tube of a woman in a vegetative state, in compliance with the consent authorized by her husband, despite protests from her parents. Schiavo subsequently died of dehydration. The Terri Schiavo Life & Hope Network, a foundation founded by Schiavo's family, was involved in the Maraachli case. The international anti-abortion community rallied around the family, offering support and money to help pay for the medical costs.
