= Mark J. Poznansky =

Research scientist, science administrator and science blogger

Mark J. Poznansky CM OOnt
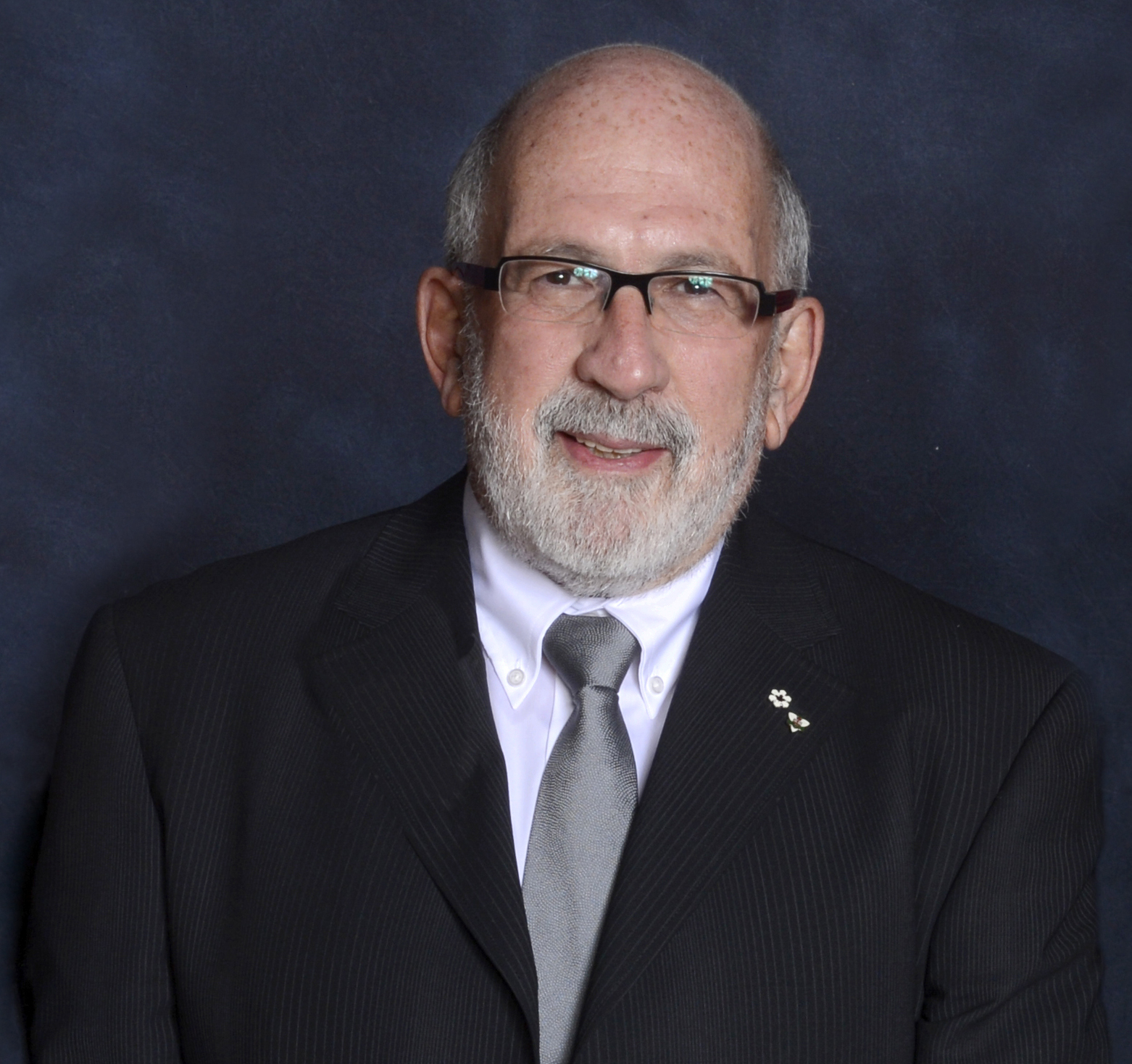
- Born: April 25, 1946 (age 80); Montreal, Quebec, Canada
- Education: McGill University
- Occupations: Scientist and Consultant
- Website: G2G Consulting Website Spindle Website Saved By Science Website

Mark J. Poznansky CM OOnt (born April 25, 1946) is a research scientist, science administrator and science blogger. He is the past president and CEO of the Ontario Genomics Institute (OGI) and was previously chair of the board of OGI, and the founder of G2G Consulting Inc. He is a member of the Order of Canada, a member of the Order of Ontario and was CEO, president and scientific director of Robarts Research Institute.

== Education and early career history ==
Born in Montreal, Poznansky was educated at McGill University, receiving his PhD in Physiology in 1970. Poznansky completed his postdoctoral training in Biophysics at Harvard Medical School in 1972, where he held the position of Lecturer in Biophysics until 1976. He also served as charge de recherche at the Collège de France in Paris from 1973 to 1974.

Poznansky returned to Canada in 1976, taking a position as associate professor of physiology at the University of Alberta in Edmonton. Over the next 18 years, he rose to the rank of Professor and his laboratory developed an international reputation both the areas of cholesterol and membrane biophysics as well as enzyme replacement therapy and the development of novel approaches to drug delivery. In 1984, Poznansky moved on to become the associate dean of medicine at the University of Alberta in Edmonton, a position he held for 9 years.

== Robarts Research Institute and the London years ==
In 1993, Poznansky arrived in London, Ontario, as president and scientific director of Robarts Research Institute. He presided over a period of growth, not only in funding and employment but in technology transfer as well. Under his helm from 1993 until 2007, Robarts Research Institute increased its staff from just over 100 to over 600. Annual research funding increased from $10 million per year to over $40 million annually and the Institute spun out 7 different companies including one that was sold to GE Healthcare.

While at Robarts, Poznansky served as president and CEO of London-based Viron Therapeutics Inc. The company was able to bring a candidate drug to the start of Phase II and raised $20 million to support future research efforts.

He was among a group that founded the London Biotechnology Incubator Inc., Ontario's first Life Sciences incubator. They were able to gain financial support to build a 50,000 sq. ft. facility in London.

The rapid physical and staffing growth of the Institute led to major financial issues in 2007, necessitating the take-over of the Robarts by the University of Western Ontario. Poznansky stepped down as scientific director at that time.

== G2G Consulting ==
In 2008, Poznansky founded G2G Consulting Inc., services such as program reviews, mediation, strategic planning, change management, leadership training and mentoring and management restructuring.

Poznansky developed a process to help the Spanish government support the life sciences industry. He worked with the Canada Foundation for Innovation.

He helped form a research partnership made up of Robarts Research Institute, Merck & Co, Merck Frosst Canada and GE Healthcare that was able to receive funding of $20 million over four years, resulting in many key research findings and publications on the subject of lung disease. Poznansky helped change the way the University of Alberta, Edmonton conducted research and helped facilitate the amalgamation of the research administration that occurred when Ottawa Civic and Ottawa General Hospitals merged to create The Ottawa Hospital. He also aided the Thunder Bay Regional Institute in attracting not only some of the "most respected health research minds in Canada" but those from around the globe.

Poznansky completed the negotiation and advanced negotiation workshops at the Harvard Negotiation Institute, Harvard Law School.

== Ontario Genomics Institute ==
Poznansky was appointed as president and CEO of the Ontario Genomics Institute (OGI) on December 1, 2010. He served in this capacity until August 1, 2017. At OGI, Poznansky helped develop the Think Synthetic Biology campaign that identified the role that synthetic biology can play in advancing research for the wellbeing of Ontarians.

== Spindle ==
On August 1, 2017, Poznansky joined Spindle, a strategic consulting firm that focuses on life and health sciences innovation, as a member of its Senior Advisory Group.

== Saved By Science Website ==
In November 2019, Poznansky launched Saved By Science, a website at www.savedbyscience.org where he blogs on four subjects related to the world of science - the environment, food, health and politics/policy. The website includes blogs on synthetic biology and climate change.

== Saved By Science: The Hope and Promise of Synthetic Biology ==
On September 22, 2020, ECW Press released Saved By Science: The Hope and Promise of Synthetic Biology. Kirkus Reviews said the book was "energetic and optimistic" and “shows how synthetic biology can be used to contend with major issues involving health, food, and the environment." An excerpt of Saved By Science: The Hope and Promise of Synthetic Biology appeared in the Toronto Star on September 19, 2020 and in Canadian Geographic on September 23, 2020 Dr. Poznansky was interviewed about the book on September 22, 2020 on SXM Canada Talks and the Gill Deacon Show on the Canadian Broadcasting Corporation English radio network.

== Chairs and board memberships ==
Poznansky is Chair of Let's Talk Science, Chief Science Advisor to the CEO of the Thunder Bay Regional Research Institute and a board member of the Innovation Institute of Ontario.

Poznansky is a founding member and past Chair of the Council for Health Research in Canada, a research advocacy group in Ottawa. He also chaired the Scientific Advisory Board of the Canadian Medical Discoveries Fund and the board of MDS Capital Corp.

He is a board member of the Consortium for the Barcode of Life.

He has sat on the boards of organizations such as Diabetogen, BioMark Inc. and TechAlliance, London. Poznansky has also been a member of science-related committees including the Science Advisory Committee of the Heart and Stroke Foundation of Canada and the Medical Research Council of Canada Grants Panel.

== Guest lecturing ==
Poznansky lectures on subjects related to the biopharmaceutical industry and research and administration and funding, including technology transfer. He also lectures on Jewish medical ethics as it pertains to human and animal experimentation.

In 2017, Dr. Poznansky lectured on the Scientific Revolution at the Dr. Louis Siminovitch Lecture Series.

He discussed Genomics Hype and Hope at the 2018 Notable Speakers Series held in Toronto.

Dr. Poznansky presented at a session at the 2019 Canadian Science Conference on: Policy Lessons in the Age of Technological Disruption.

== Other accomplishments ==
In 2005, Poznansky was made a member of the Order of Canada and a member of the Order of Ontario. He is also the recipient of the Queen Elizabeth II Golden Jubilee Medal.

Poznansky led the development of the book Using Our Heads, "a celebration of innovation that was supported by the Ontario Innovation Trust (OIT)."

He is one of the founders of the Canadian Medical Hall of Fame, and served on its board of directors from 1994 to 2001.

== Other books ==
- Reminiscences (2023, FriesenPress)
- The Giving Tree ... A Metaphor for Climate Change (2023, Dorrance Publishing Company), with Shoshana Israel.
