= Karma Group =

International hotel and resort company

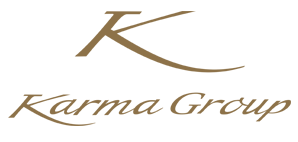
- Type: Resorts
- Industry: Hospitality
- Founded: 1993; 33 years ago in Goa, India
- Founder: John Spence
- Area served: Worldwide
- Key people: John Spence (Chairman)
- Products: Karma Club, Karma Group Investment, Fractional Ownership, Karma Points
- Website: karmagroup.com

Karma Group is an international hotel and resort company owned by English entrepreneur and hotelier, John Spence. As of 2025, it operates 42 properties worldwide. Its first property, Karma Royal Beach Club, opened in South Goa on 3rd Dec 1993.

== History ==
British-born John Spence (born 23 February 1961)Spence founded the company Royal Resorts in 1993. The group's first property was purchased in Goa on the west coast of India. The company sold fractional ownership in these Goa properties directly to India's middle class, then to affluent expatriate Indians living in Dubai and Oman. Royal Resorts then expanded and built more properties in the region, firstly under the Royal Resorts brand in Indonesia, (Karma Royal Candidasa, Karma Royal Jimbaran, Karma Royal Sanur) in the late 90s, and then under the Karma Resorts brand with the first property, Karma Jimbaran, opening on the island of Bali in 2005.

By the end of the 1990s, the company had opened 70 sales offices worldwide. In 2003, the group launched the Karma Resorts brand. The company continued to add properties to its portfolio, notably in Greece (Crete and Mykonos), Indonesia (Bali, Lombok, Java), India (Kerala and Jaipur), Germany (Bavaria), France (St Tropez and Carcassonne), and the Isles of Scilly (si-lee). In 2008, Karma Kandara was opened in the south of Bali with 78 Infinity Pool Villas and private beach. In 2013, Karma acquired the Cote D'Azur chateau Le Preverger, once the home of UK designer Laura Ashley. In 2014, Spence acquired the rights for Karma Rottnest on Rottnest Island, West Australia, off the coast of Perth, and managed it until it was handed back to the WA Government in 2022. Karma Resorts sponsored the Rottnest Channel Swim and were naming sponsors from 2015 to 2018.

In 2017, Karma Group entered into an agreement with Sanctum Hotels Group as part of a five-year plan to expand the Group's holdings to 60 resorts. In 2018, Karma Group opened new resorts in Thailand (Karma Apsara) and Vietnam (Karma Song Hoia). In 2019, it announced the opening of Karma Sitabani, in the Jim Corbett National Park, part of the Corbett Tiger Reserve, in Uttarakhand in Northern India. In December 2020, the company acquired Salford Hall (in the Cotswolds, England), near Stratford on Avon, which dates back to 1487.

In 2021, Karma Group expanded its operations in Spain by acquiring real estate in Andalusia.

In 2022 the company acquired Lake of Menteith Hotel in Stirlingshire, expanding its operations to Scotland.

In 2022 the group expanded to include Karma Munnar (Munnar, India), Karma Lake of Menteith (Stirling, Scotland).

In 2022, Karma Group took control of a Nile River Boat, Karma Karnak, which provides Nile cruises for its members. In 2023, land-based accommodation in Sharm El Sheik was also acquired, called Karma Sobek.

In 2023, Karma Group revived Karma Margaret River resort and added Karma Martam Retreat (Sikkim, India).

In 2023, Karma Kandara was extended with the Mentari Residences, 58 one- and two- bedroom apartments in a four-level apartment block, with three other apartment blocks in development.

In 2024, Karma Group took control of Maldives 16-cabin boat Karma Fushi, taking members on 4-7 day trips across the Maldives.

In 2024, Karma Group acquired a 36-room resort in Siem Reap, Cambodia, Karma Bayon.

As of 2024, Karma Group has properties in 27 locations. Over 90000 Club Members, and over 3,500 Staff Members. Projects in development include: Gili Meno (Lombok), Palawan (Philippines), Hakuba (Japan), Bahamas, Jimbaran (Bali), Mykonos (Greece), Sri Lanka, and Goa. Karma Boutique sells Karma-branded products.

== Public activities ==
Karma Group has been supporting Christel House India, a charity that supports inner city children from Bangalore since 2001 and supports similar initiatives in Bali and Vietnam.

In 2020–2021 during the COVID-19 pandemic, Karma Group vaccinated staff, their families, and community in India and Indonesia, and provided food donations to affected communities. Within the Karma Mayday initiative, the company teamed up with the Prince of Wales Trust to provide oxygen equipment for India.

In 2022, after the Russian invasion of Ukraine, Karma group set up Karma Refuge, which provides shelter and support to those fleeing the conflict.
