= Alastair Buchan =

British neurologist and researcher in stroke medicine

Alastair Buchan (born 16 October 1955) is a British neurologist and researcher in stroke medicine. His main research interest is how to make neuroprotection a reality in the clinic. From October 2008 until January 2017, he served as the Dean of Medicine and the Head of the Medical Sciences Division, University of Oxford. He currently holds the Chair of Stroke Research at the University of Oxford.

== Education ==
Buchan was educated at Repton School in Derbyshire and graduated in 1980 from his medical studies at the University of Cambridge, University of Oxford and Harvard University.

He undertook his post-graduate medical training with Sir David Weatherall in Oxford and completed his neurological training in North America, with Henry J. M. Barnett in London, Ontario and in stroke with Fred Plum in New York.

== Career ==
=== Early career ===
Buchan held staff positions as a consultant neurologist in London and Ottawa before becoming the Heart and Stroke Foundation Professor in Stroke Research in Calgary, Alberta in 1995.

During ten years in Calgary, Buchan built up a team which established a fully comprehensive regional Stroke Programme and led large multi-centre studies CASES, ASPECTS and FASTER. When he returned to Oxford in 2005, he left Calgary with an Acute Stroke Imaging Centre, an Experimental Imaging Centre and the Clinical Stroke Programme, which facilitate translation of the experimental research work in the laboratory to the clinical setting. For his services, the University of Calgary awarded Buchan an honorary Degrees of Laws (LLD) in May 2009.

=== Oxford ===
His early work at Oxford included obtaining funding from the MRC, the Leducq Foundation and the Dunhill Foundation to set up an Acute Stroke Programme in collaboration with Peter Jezzard and Peter Rothwell. He was the Translational Research Director for the UK Stroke Research Network. He also led the Oxford University bid for a Wellcome Clinical Research facility and successfully obtained funding for the new Acute Vascular Imaging Centre (AVIC).

Buchan was initially elected to the Chair of Clinical Geratology but now holds the Chair of Stroke Research, named for George Pickering, at the University of Oxford.

In 2006, Buchan was appointed Director for the National Institute for Health and Care Research (NIHR) Oxford Biomedical Research Centre, one of the five comprehensive centres. At the same time, he was charged with the task of heading the John Radcliffe Hospital Division of the Nuffield Department of Medicine. He established and chaired the cabinet of the UK Biomedical Research Directors for the other five centres in the country.

Appointed Dean and Head of the Medical Sciences Division in 2007, he was instrumental in establishing a number of new departments in the university, including the Nuffield Department of Clinical Neurosciences, the Department of Oncology, the Nuffield Department of Population Health, the Nuffield Department of Primary Health and the Radcliffe Department of Medicine, as well as the Oxford University Hospitals NHS Trust in November 2011.

In his previous position as Pro-Vice-Chancellor and Head of Brexit Strategy he brokered partnerships with the Universities and hospitals in Berlin to establish the Oxford-Berlin Research Partnership which includes a centre for Oxford in Berlin.

== Fellowships ==
In April 2007, he was made a Fellow of the Academy of Medical Sciences (FMedSci).
