= Ian McWhinney =

English physician and academic

Ian McWhinney OC FRCP FRCGP FCFP
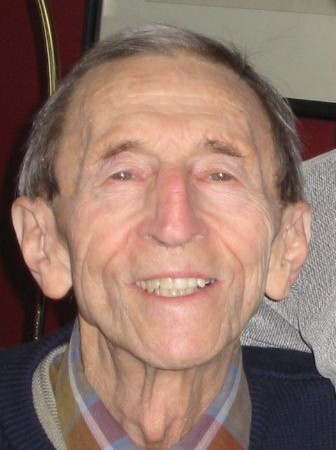
- Born: 11 October 1926; Burnley, England
- Died: 28 September 2012 (aged 85)
- Occupations: physician and academic
- Awards: Order of Canada, Canadian Medical Hall of Fame

Ian Renwick McWhinney (11 October 1926 – 28 September 2012) was an English physician and academic known as Canada's "Founding Father of Family Medicine" for his work in creating a family medicine program at the University of Western Ontario.

== Early life ==
Born in Burnley, England, he studied at Cheltenham College from 1940 to 1944. During World War II, he served with the Royal Army Medical Corps. After the war, he studied at Clare College, Cambridge and at St. Bartholomew’s Hospital at the University of London.

== Medical career ==
He practiced family medicine with his father in Stratford-upon-Avon for thirteen years.

He was inspired by particularly two articles, the work of James MacKenzie and a paper about postgraduate teaching in family practice in the New England Journal of Medicine. These led him to author his first book, The Early Signs of Illness: Observations in General Practice in 1964 and then gain a Nuffield Traveling Fellowship in family medicine with Robert Haggerty at Harvard University. By 1968, he had moved his family away from his father and to the University of Western Ontario as the first chair of family medicine in Canada. He became admired as the ‘Osler’ of Canadian family physicians.

He published around 110 articles during his lifetime and is best remembered for his influential A Textbook of Family Medicine.

In 1989, he published the Introduction to Family Medicine (ISBN 0-19-511518-X) which is now in its third edition. In his last years, he worked tirelessly on his writings; his memoir, "A Call to Heal: Reflections on a Life in Family Medicine" (ISBN 978-1-927352-10-6) was published posthumously in 2013.

In 1997, he was made an Officer of the Order of Canada. In 2000, he was awarded honorary degrees from the University of Oslo and the University of Western Ontario. In 2006, he was inducted into the Canadian Medical Hall of Fame.

== Death and legacy ==
McWhinney died on 28 September 2012.

The Ian McWhinney Family Medicine Education Award is presented to a teacher of family medicine who has demonstrated impact in Canada.
