= John Spence (businessman) =

British businessman

- Born: 23 February 1961 (age 65)
- Years active: 1981 — present
- Known for: Karma Group
- Title: Founder and Chairman of Karma Group
- Website: www.karmagroup.com

John Spence (born 23 February 1961) is a British-born founder and chairman of the Karma Group, an international boutique luxury hotel and resort group. In the 1980s, Spence worked as a manager for several bands including Culture Club, the Eurythmics, and Bananarama. In 1993, he founded Royal Resorts and developed the first resort in Goa. He was awarded EY Entrepreneur Award in 2010 and 2011.

In 2021, Spence co-authored "Next Generation Tourism" with Henry Squire and Patrick Bellew at the Yale School of Architecture. The book examines sustainable design and material use, with a focus on ecological strategies and emerging tourism models in Gili Meno, Indonesia, addressing sustainable development in sensitive island ecosystems.

== Life ==
Spence was born in England. His family worked in the aviation and tourism industries. In 1980, Spence studied at York University but dropped out after a few terms to become a guitarist. After failing as a musician, Spence worked as an agent and tour manager for several bands, such as Culture Club, the Eurythmics, and Bananarama.

Since the age of twenty, he has spent most of his life on the road and in hotels, traveling for business and pleasure all over the world. In 1984, he became involved in the hotel business in Tenerife, Canary Islands, with Global Hotel Alliance.In 1993, during a travel conference in India, he decided to resign from his position, liquidate his savings and sell his residence in London.

In 1993, Spence used all his funds to found Royal Resorts and develop his first resort in Goa, India coastline. By the end of the 1990s, the company had opened 70 sales offices worldwide. In 1996, First Royal Resort opens (Karma Royal Benaulim). In 2005, Spence rebranded the company to Karma Group – an international boutique luxury hospitality brand. Spence owns 100% of the company. In that year he moved to Perth. Spence served as a commissioner on the West Australian Tourism Board from 2006 to March 2010.

In 2010 and 2011, he won Ernst & Young Entrepreneur of the Year Awards. In 2015, the University of California honored Spence by awarding him a Distinguished Visiting Fellowship in the Department of Architecture and Urban Design. During COVID-19, as part of the Karma Mayday initiative, Spence teamed up with HRH The Prince of Wales Trust to provide oxygen equipment to India.

In its 32nd edition from 2018, Hotelier Indonesia highlighted that under the guidance of Spence, the Karma Group engaged in collaborations with various architects and designers to upgrade and establish new properties. The partnership with P-A-T-T-E-R-N-S Architects resulted in the development of projects like Karma Sanctum, Bali, and the addition of the Karma Beach Club to the Karma Kandara property.

In 2019, Spence has been awarded the Edward P. Bass Honorary Fellowship at Yale University's School of Architecture. This marked the first occasion on which Yale conferred this honor upon an individual for a second time.

== Hospitality Career and Recognitions ==
John Spence is known for his contributions to the hospitality industry through the Karma Group, a global luxury resort and lifestyle brand. He introduced the "Five Star Hippy" concept, blending luxury with wellness and entertainment, which has been implemented in Karma Group's properties across 12 countries, including Cambodia, Egypt, France, Germany, Greece, India, Indonesia, Italy, Spain, Thailand, the United Kingdom, and Vietnam. Since its founding, Karma Group has expanded its portfolio to 40 properties and offers bespoke services to its members, including the recently launched Karma Concierge.

In 2013 and again in 2019, Spence was appointed as the Edward P. Bass Distinguished Visiting Architecture Fellow at Yale University’s School of Architecture, making him the first person to receive this honor more than once. During his time at Yale, he collaborated with students on projects such as the design of a bodega in Spain’s Rioja region. Spence was also awarded a Distinguished Visiting Fellowship at the University of California, Los Angeles (UCLA) in 2015, where he worked with students to design a 40-room hotel in Mykonos for Karma Group. Additionally, he has collaborated with students at the University of Pennsylvania on various development projects, including a chateau in Carcassonne, France.

Spence’s company remains 100% privately owned, with no debt or leverage. Karma Group has diversified its offerings with the development of Karma Wines, a collaboration with winemakers across Tuscany, Bordeaux, and Crete. The group’s spirits portfolio includes a 10-year-aged Scotch whisky and Karma Gin, crafted from botanicals sourced from the regions where its resorts are located.

== Philanthropy and Social Impact ==
John Spence has been actively involved in philanthropic activities through Karma Group's "Karma Cares" initiative, supporting communities in regions where the company operates. Since founding Karma Group in Bangalore in 1991, the company has donated over $1 million to Christel House, a learning center for disadvantaged children in Bangalore, as well as schools in Venezuela, Mexico City, and South Africa. Spence also leads the annual "Penguin Walk" a fundraising event in St. Tropez, France, which has raised over £70,000 to provide university scholarships for Christel House students.

Karma Group has also supported charitable initiatives in Bali through the Bali Life Foundation and continues to sponsor children's welfare programs such as Children's Hope In Action (CHIA) in Vietnam. During the COVID-19 pandemic, Karma Group partnered with HRH The Prince of Wales Trust and the British Asian Trust to provide oxygen equipment in India, while also offering accommodation and shelter to Ukrainian refugees at its property in France.

In addition to its long-standing charitable efforts, Karma Group has contributed to environmental and health initiatives. The company supported vaccination efforts in Bali for staff and local communities during the COVID-19 pandemic and has been involved in various charity events, including sponsoring the "Road to Rome" charity race, which raised funds for the Motor Neurone Disease Foundation in 2024.
