= Children's Hospital at London Health Sciences Centre =

Coordinates: 42.9604°N 81.2266°W

- London Health Sciences Centre

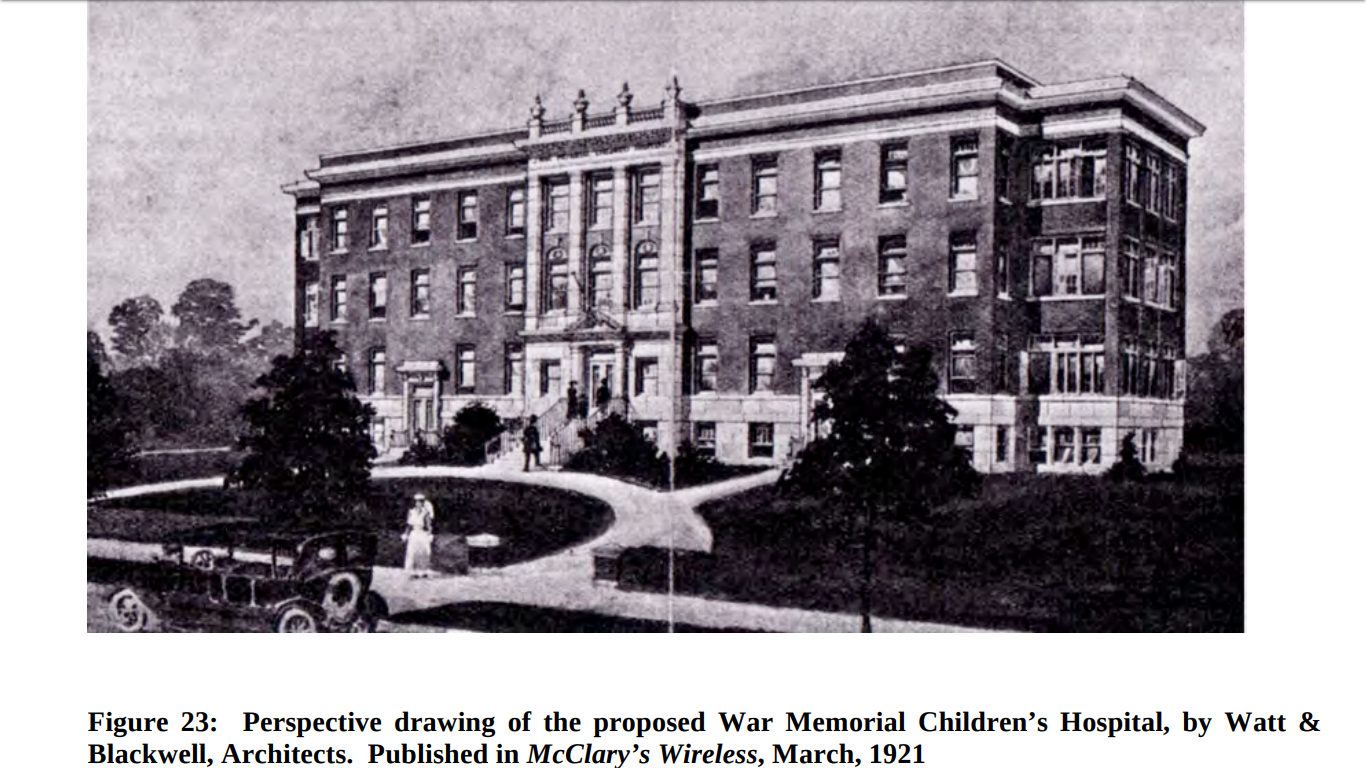
- Perspective drawing of the proposed War Memorial Children’s Hospital, March, 1921

Geography
- Location: 800 Commissioners Road East; London, Ontario, Canada

Organization
- Care system: Public Medicare (Canada) (OHIP)
- Type: Specialist
- Affiliated university: Schulich School of Medicine & Dentistry

Services
- Emergency department: Level I trauma centre
- Beds: 139 With 36 Bassinets
- Speciality: Pediatrics

History
- Founded: 1917

Links
- Website: www.lhsc.on.ca/About_Us/Childrens_Hospital/
- Lists: Hospitals in Canada

The Children's Hospital at London Health Sciences Centre is a children's hospital in London, Ontario, Canada that provides paediatric care for patients from the London metropolitan area and the rest of Southwestern Ontario.

A separate Children's hospital, named the War Memorial Children's Hospital was completed in 1922. It was built in the same art deco style as the School of Medicine and Nurse's residence that shared a block with it.

The Children's Hospital shared facilities with Victoria Hospital since 1985, when it was renamed Children's Hospital of Western Ontario. The Children's Hospital acquired its current name, in 2007, when the handsome 85-year-old building was determined to be too old to be worth updating, when the Children's Hospital was moved into the Victoria Hospital complex, across the street.

The Victoria Hospital complex is the largest hospital in southwestern Ontario.

The Globe and Mail called the hospital "One of Canada's most prestigious medical institutions".

In 1951 the Children's Hospital was the first facility in the world to deploy a Cobalt-60 Beam Therapy Unit to deliver radiation therapy to cancer patients.

In 2011 the hospital took the rare step of responding to a viral video. Fox News focussed on the hospital's recommendation to remove life support from a brain dead newborn. Other American sites characterized the hospital's recommendation as an example of a Canadian "death panel". The infant, known as "baby Joseph", had been born with a "severe and progressively deteriorating neurological condition." His body was only being kept alive through a ventilator and has a feeding tube. Hospital medical staff determined he would never be able to show any signs of consciousness, and recommended removing his life support tubes.

In October 2018 Ontario's first instance of a new kind of robot assisted brain surgery was performed at the hospital. The fourteen-year-old patient, had been suffering disabling epileptic seizures almost his entire life. In August 2019 he was deemed seizure free. The hospital is the only facility in Ontario performing robot-assisted stereoelectroencephalography surgery. Hospitals in Calgary and Montreal are also capable of performing this surgery.

In 2019 the hospital developed a dispute with the TLC Foundation. The local man who founded the organization was barred from visiting the hospital. In 2019 the hospital introduced a policy barring strangers delivering gifts to patients in person. The policy requires gifts to be vetted by hospital staff, to preserve the safety of patients, and to make sure no patient receives unwelcome visitors, or gifts.

A young patient, with brain cancer, who the Foundation's founder had been visiting for four years, released a video, shortly before Christmas, 2019, where he characterized the hospital's policy as stripping him of one of his few friends.
