= Charles George Drake =

Canadian neurosurgeon

- Born: July 21, 1920; Windsor, Ontario, Canada
- Died: September 15, 1998 (aged 78)
- Education: University of Western Ontario (BSc, MD)
- Occupation: Neurosurgeon
- Spouse: Ruth Pitts
- Awards: Order of Canada; Order of Ontario

Charles George Drake CC OOnt FRCSC (July 21, 1920 – September 15, 1998) was a Canadian neurosurgeon known for his work on treating aneurysms.

== Life ==
Born in Windsor, Ontario, he received his BSc and MD degrees from The University of Western Ontario.

In 1969, Dr. Drake became the first chair of the Department of Clinical Neurological Sciences at the University of Western Ontario. From 1974 until 1984 he was Chairman of the Department of Surgery at the University of Western Ontario. In 1986, he co-founded the Robarts Research Institute, which was Canada's only independent medical research centre until its recent merger with the university. While he practiced, he was a member of The Harvey Club of London, the oldest medical club in Canada.

He was the president of the Royal College of Physicians and Surgeons of Canada (1971–1973), the American Association of Neurological Surgeons (1977), the American College of Surgeons (1984–1985), the World Federation of Neurological Societies (1977–1981), the Society of Neurological Surgeons (1980), and the American Surgical Association (1986–1987).

In 1982 he was made an Officer of the Order of Canada and was promoted to Companion in 1998. In 1994 he was inducted in the Canadian Medical Hall of Fame. There is also a metal bust of his head outside the main entrance of London's University Hospital, where Drake practised. The bust was unveiled in 2003 by his wife Ruth and Della Reese, one of his former patients.

He married Ruth Pitts.

== Honours ==

| Ribbon | Description | Notes |
| | Order of Canada (CC) | Officer 20 April 1983; Companion 19 August 1998 |
| | Order of Ontario (O.Ont) | Member; 1989 |
| | 125th Anniversary of the Confederation of Canada Medal | 1992 |

== Other Honours ==
- F.N.G. Starr Award, Canadian Medical Association
- Harvey Cushing Medal, American Association of Neurological Surgeons

== Honorary Degrees ==
Honorary degrees

| Location | Date | School | Degree |
|---|---|---|---|
| Ontario | June 1982 | University of Toronto | Doctor of Laws (LL.D) |
| Nova Scotia | 1984 | Dalhousie University | Doctor of Laws (LL.D) |
| Ontario | 15 June 1987 | University of Western Ontario | Doctor of Science (D.Sc) |
