= London Health Sciences Centre =

Geography
- Location: 800 Commissioners Road East; London, Ontario; N6A 5W9
- Coordinates: 42.9603°N 81.2265°W

Organisation
- Care system: Medicare

History
- Founded: 1995

Links
- Website: www.lhsc.on.ca

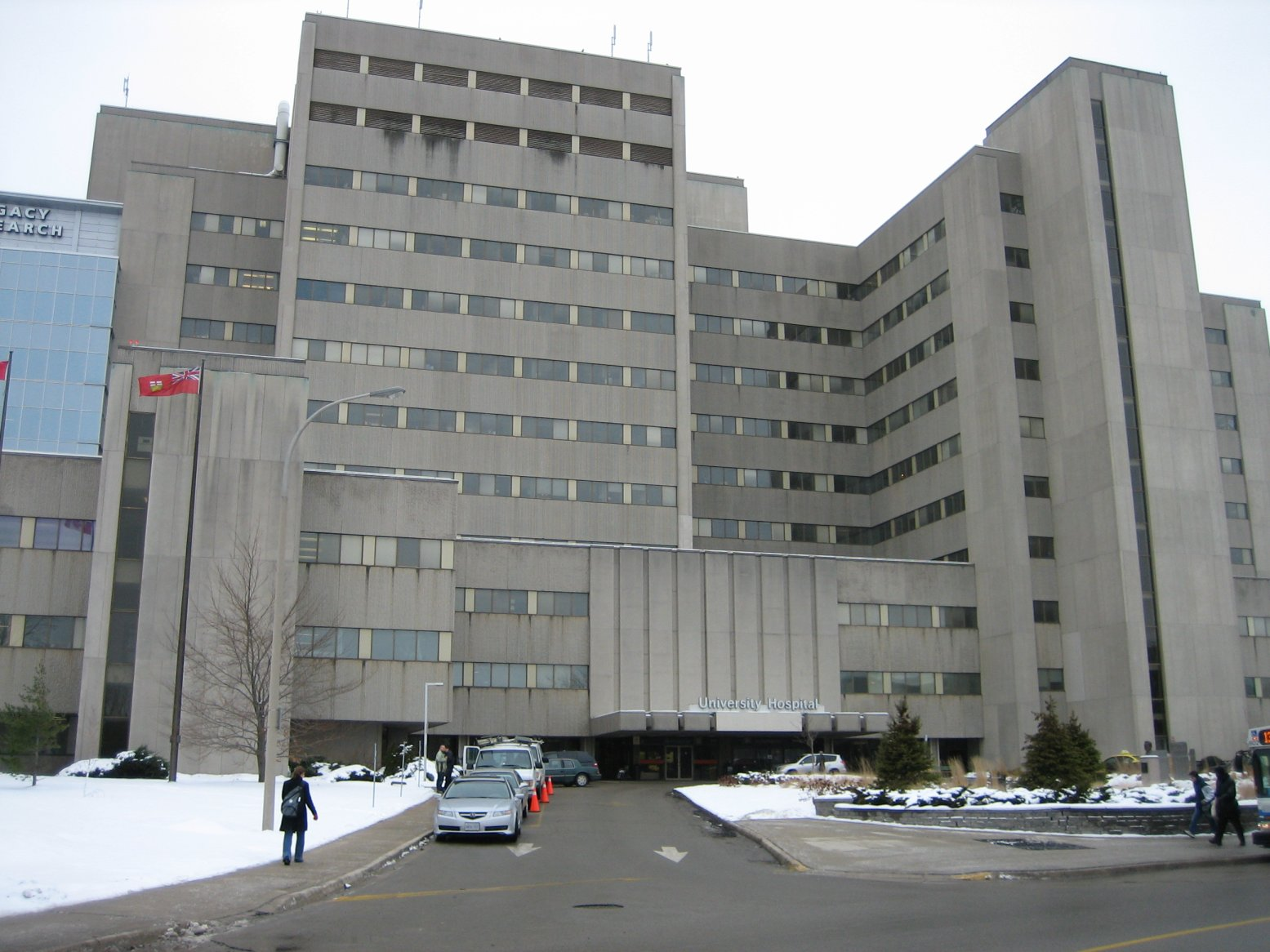
University Hospital main entrance

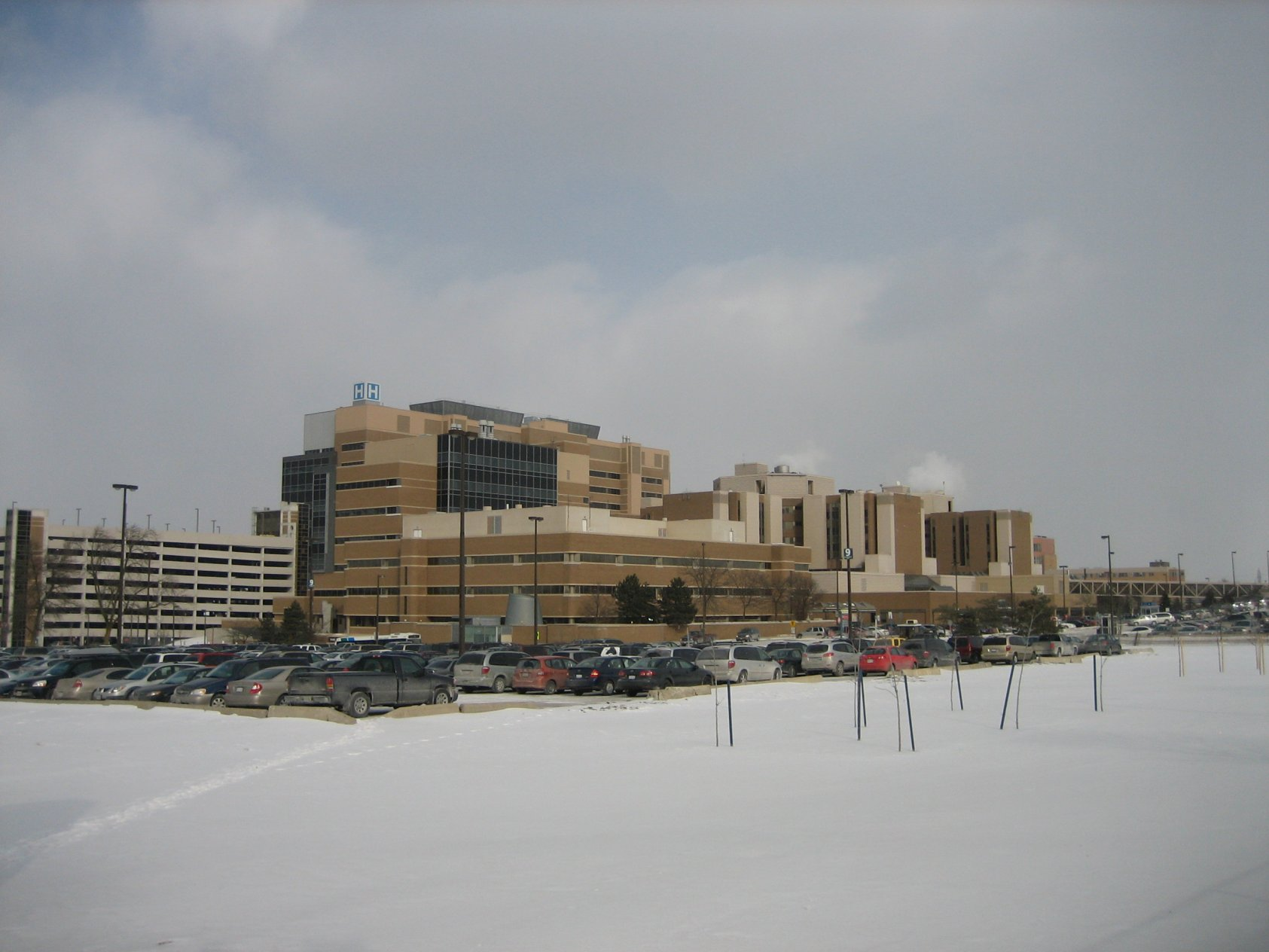
Victoria Hospital from the corner of Commissioners Road and Wellington Road

London Health Sciences Centre is a hospital network in London, Ontario and is collectively one of Canada's largest acute-care teaching hospitals. It was formed in 1995 as a result of the merger of University Hospital and Victoria Hospital. In affiliation with the Schulich School of Medicine & Dentistry at the University of Western Ontario, it trains more than 1,800 medical and care professionals annually. It operates two hospital facilities, University Hospital and Victoria Hospital which includes the Children's Hospital at London Health Sciences Centre.

== History ==
Donald Alexander Macdonald, Lieutenant-Governor of Ontario, officially opened the London General Hospital in 1875. Its legacy as a teaching hospital dates from 1882, when the Faculty of Medicine of the University of Western Ontario was opened at St. James Street. In 1887, there were 60 students, too many for the original site, and a new building was constructed at Waterloo and York Streets.

The biggest of changes came in 1921 after a new building was opened at South and Waterloo Street and in 1965 when the faculty moved to the university campus.

The London General Training School for Nurses opened in 1883 with total of three students. It was the third nursing school opened in Canada. All students were living in the hospital until the Nurses' Residence was opened in 1905. In 1975, the nursing program was transferred to Fanshawe College. Today, with the amalgamation of both the University Hospital campus and Victoria Hospital campus within London Health Sciences Centre, both are educational sites for nursing students from both Fanshawe College and the University of Western Ontario, in addition to public-health, dentistry and medicine students at the Schulich School of Medicine & Dentistry and the broader University of Western Ontario Faculty of Graduate Studies.

In January 2021, President and CEO Paul Woods apologized for travelling to the United States five times since the start of the COVID-19 pandemic in Ontario – including over the Christmas holidays – contrary to public health advice against non-essential international travel. Woods is a Canadian citizen and lives in London by himself, while his family lives in Michigan. All of his trips were approved by the London Health Sciences Centre Board. In November 2020, during a COVID-19 outbreak at University Hospital which killed 26 people, Woods had sent a memo to health workers under him admonishing them for not strictly following public health advice and stating that they should be held to a higher standard. Upon CBC News breaking the story, Woods issued a statement saying that he would respect public health advice on non-essential travel in the future. On January 11, Woods was fired as CEO, and the board retracted earlier statements that it had approved Woods's trips.

In 2021, Jackie Schleifer Taylor was appointed CEO. She went on medical leave in 2023. She left the job in June 2024. David Musyj, Windsor Regional Hospital's president, was appointed acting president of London Health Sciences Centre in May 2024.

== See also ==
- PolyAnalytik
