= Stroke (journal) =

- Discipline: Neurology
- Language: English

Publication details
- History: 1970–present
- Publisher: Lippincott Williams & Wilkins on behalf of the American Heart Association (United States)
- Frequency: Monthly
- Open access: After 12 months
- Impact factor: 7.9 (2023)

Standard abbreviations
- ISO 4: Stroke

Indexing
- CODEN: SJCCA7
- ISSN: 0039-2499 (print); 1524-4628 (web)
- LCCN: 70019475
- OCLC no.: 01714534

Links
- Journal homepage; Online archive; Online archive

Stroke is a peer-reviewed medical journal published monthly by Lippincott Williams & Wilkins on behalf of the American Heart Association. It covers research on cerebral circulation and related diseases, including clinical research on assessment of risk for stroke, diagnosis, prevention, and treatment, as well as rehabilitation. All articles become open access after a 12-month embargo. The editor-in-chief is Argye E. Hillis.

== Indexing and abstracting ==
The journal is indexed and abstracted in the following bibliographic databases:

- Biological Abstracts
- BIOSIS
- CAB Abstracts
- Chemical Abstracts
- CINAHL
- Current Contents
- Embase
- MEDLINE
- Science Citation Index Expanded

According to the Journal Citation Reports, the journal has a 2023 impact factor of 7.9, ranking it 15th out of 280 journals in the category "Clinical Neurology" and 4th out of 96 journals in the category "Peripheral Vascular Disease".
