= Lawson Health Research Institute =

Canadian research institute

Coordinates: 43.00014°N 81.2543°W

Lawson Research Institute is the research institute of St. Joseph's Health Care London and works in partnership with the University of Western Ontario.

== Timeline ==
- 1983: Supported by Sister Mary Doyle, former Executive Director of St. Joseph's, the Sisters of St. Joseph's establish the hospital's official research institute. LHSC and Upjohn jointly open the Victoria Upjohn Clinical Research Unit at South Street Hospital (formerly Victoria Hospital), focusing on Phase I-III clinical trials.
- 1987: The St. Joseph's research institute is named the Lawson Research Institute (LRI) in honour of London businessman and philanthropist Colonel Tom Lawson and his wife, Miggsie Lawson - close friends of Sister Mary Doyle and major supporters of the research mission.
- 1990: Victoria Hospital takes over the operation of the clinical research unit at South Street, renaming it the Victoria Clinical Trials Centre.
- 1997: The Victoria Clinical Trials Centre is renamed London Health Sciences Centre Research Inc. and becomes a fully incorporated research institute overseeing all hospital-based research within London Health Sciences Centre sites: Victoria Hospital, University Hospital and South Street Hospital.
- 2000: LRI and LHSCRI merge to form a joint venture: Lawson Health Research Institute.
- 2024: LHSC and St. Joseph's Health Care London unveiled new research institutes on October 16, 2024

== Research areas ==
Research Specialties include:

- Imaging
- Mental Health
- Surgical Specialties
- Mobility and Activity
- Aging and Geriatrics
- Endocrinology, Metabolism and chronic diseases

== Animal testing controversy ==
In August 2025, the Investigative Journalism Bureau of the University of Toronto revealed that secretive experiments on dogs were held at the Research Institute, where up to three-hour-long heart attacks were induced in the animals before killing them and removing their hearts.

Following public outcry, Ontario's Prime Minister Doug Ford announced he will propose a bill banning animal testing on cats and dogs in the province.

== See also ==
- Sunnybrook Research Institute
