= Robarts Research Institute =

Canadian university medical institute

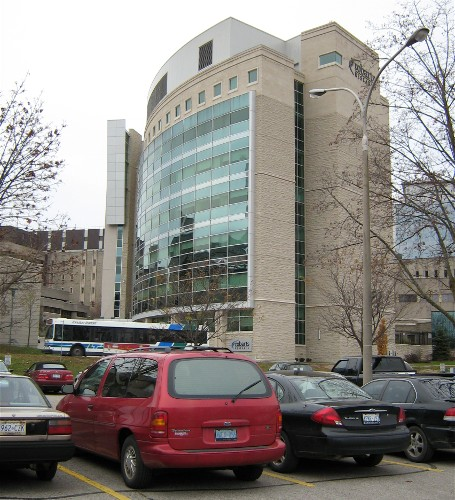
The Robarts Research Institute primary building

The Robarts Research Institute is a medical research institute at the University of Western Ontario, as part of the Schulich School of Medicine and Dentistry. Staff scientists work to investigate a range of diseases including heart disease, stroke, diabetes, Alzheimer's disease, and cancer.

== History ==
The institute was founded in 1986 by neurologist Henry Barnett, known for his discovery of aspirin as a preventive therapy for heart attack and stroke. Mark J. Poznansky became Scientific Director in 1993 and was awarded the Order of Canada in 2005 for his work at Robarts.

== Location ==
Robarts is located in London, Ontario (1151 Richmond Street, London, Ontario, Canada, N6A 3K7).
