= University Hospital (London, Ontario) =

Hospital in London, Ontario, Canada

- London Health Sciences Centre
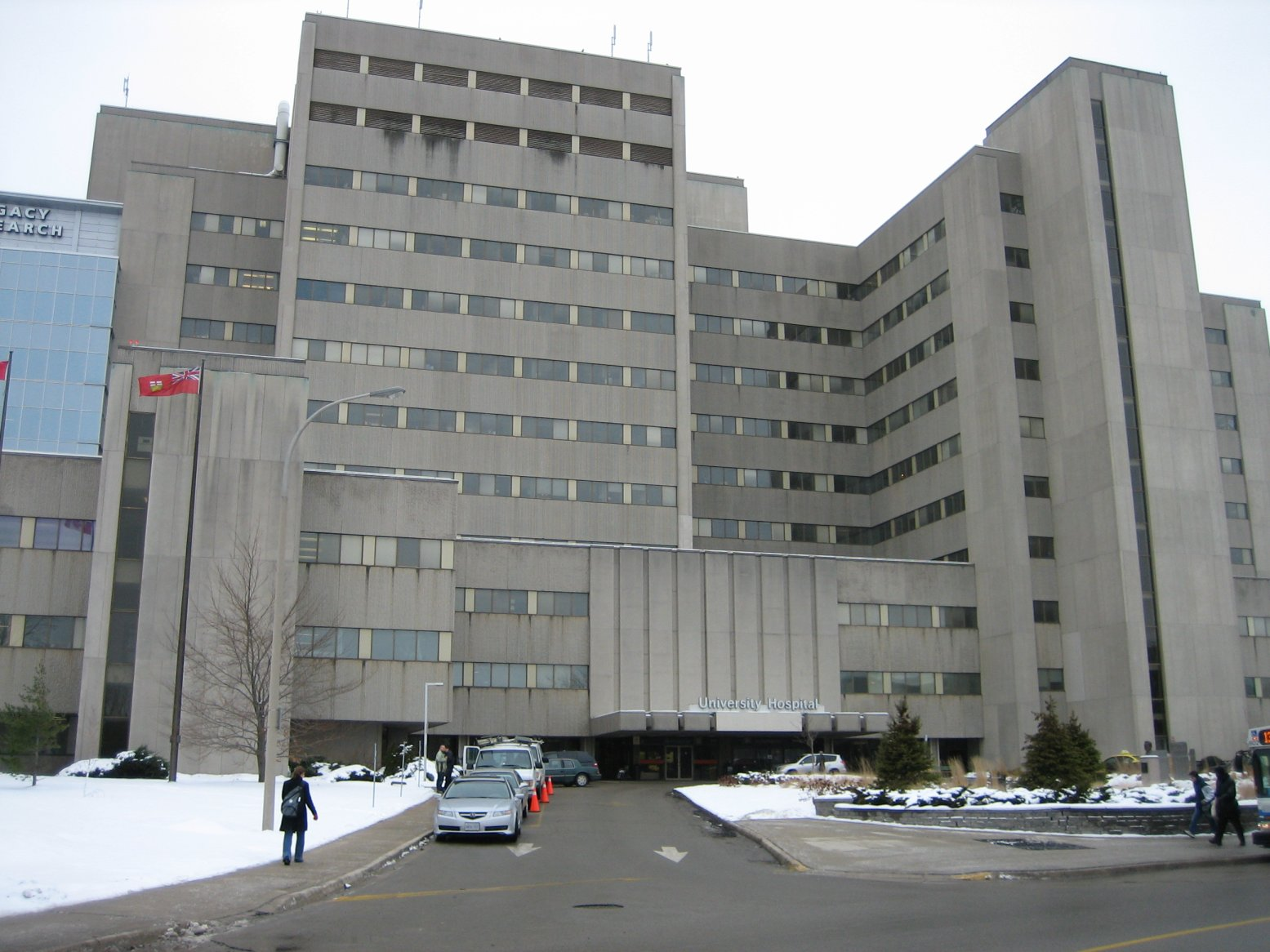

- Location in Ontario

Geography
- Location: London, Ontario, Canada
- Coordinates: 43.0125°N 81.275°W

Organization
- Care system: Public Medicare (Canada)
- Type: Teaching
- Affiliated university: Schulich School of Medicine & Dentistry

Services
- Emergency department: Level I trauma centre
- Beds: 418
- Speciality: Multiple

Helipads
- Helipad: TC LID: CPR4

History
- Founded: 1972

Links
- Website: http://www.lhsc.on.ca/
- Lists: Hospitals in Canada

University Hospital is a large teaching hospital in London, Ontario, Canada, that is affiliated with the University of Western Ontario's Schulich School of Medicine & Dentistry. It is part of the London Health Sciences Centre hospital network and the Lawson Health Research Institute, which manages clinical research across all London hospitals. The hospital was formally opened in September 1972 by Canadian neurosurgeon Wilder Penfield.

Neurosurgeon Charles Drake achieved international renown for his innovative surgery for brain aneurysms at University Hospital, which attracted patients and surgeons from around the world to London.
