= 2024 Canadian honours =

Canadian government recognitions

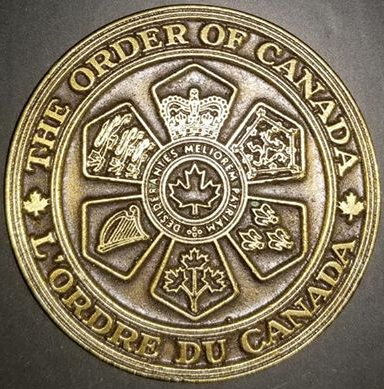
The Seal of the Order of Canada

The following are the appointments to various Canadian Honours of 2024. Usually, they are announced as part of the New Year and Canada Day celebrations and are published within the Canada Gazette during year. This follows the custom set out within the United Kingdom which publishes its appoints of various British Honours for New Year's and for monarch's official birthday. However, instead of the midyear appointments announced on Victoria Day, the official birthday of the Canadian Monarch, this custom has been transferred with the celebration of Canadian Confederation and the creation of the Order of Canada.

However, as the Canada Gazette publishes appointment to various orders, decorations and medal, either Canadian or from Commonwealth and foreign states, this article will reference all Canadians so honoured for the 2024 calendar year.

Provincial Honours are not listed within the Canada Gazette, however they are listed within the various publications of each provincial government. Provincial honours are listed within the page.

The first appointments to the Order of Canada were announced on December 28, 2023. Further appointments were announced on June 27th, 2024.

Appointments to the Order of Ontario were announced on January 1, 2024.

All listed postnominals are postnominals held by a person immediately prior to their appointment to a given order

== The Order of Canada ==
=== Companions of the Order of Canada ===
Undress ribbon of a Companion of the Order of Canada

- Hon. Serge Joyal PC OC OQ (This is a promotion within the Order.)
- J. Wilton Littlechild AOE MSC KC
- Ronald Stewart OC ONS (This is a promotion within the Order.)
- Monique Forget Leroux CM OQ (This is a promotion within the Order.)

=== Officer of the Order of Canada ===
Undress ribbon of an Officer of the Order of Canada

- Hon. Willie Adams
- Joséphine Bacon OQ
- Ian Burton
- Richard Burzynski
- William Arthur Stewart Buxton
- Chang Keun Choi
- Wenona Giles
- Réjean Hébert
- Louise Imbeault ONB
- Firdaus Kharas
- Linda Jane Manzer
- Albert D. Marshall
- Paul Myles O’Byrne
- Peter Robb Pearson
- Hon. Steven Lewis Point OBC
- Yusuf Altintas
- Pamela Geraldine Appelt
- Martha Rachel Friendly
- Mellissa Veronica Fung
- Chit Chan Gunn CM OBC (This is a promotion within the Order.)
- Beverley Jean Johnston
- Daniel Gérald Lavoie
- Lindsay Machan
- Daphne Maurer
- Charles M. Morin OQ
- Jack Cyril Pearpoint
- Stephen Shawn Poloz
- Kenneth John Rockwood
- Frances Estelle Reed Simons
- Douglas Wade Stephan
- Jozef Straus
- Vaira Vike-Freiberga GCB OQ (Honorary Appointment)
- Kent George Nagano GOQ MSM (Honorary Appointment)
- Richard Wayne Hill Sr. (Honorary Appointment)

=== Members of the Order of Canada ===
Undress ribbon for a Member of the Order of Canada

- Jodi Leanne Abbott
- Yisa Folasele Akinbolaji
- Sara Joy Angel
- Antonio Ariganello
- Nurjehan Aziz Vassanji
- Glen Baker
- Morris L. Barer
- Anne Bassett
- Ardyth Brott
- Alfredo Caxaj
- Susanne Craig
- Patrick Gordon Crean
- Michael de Adder
- Raquel Zegarra del Carpio-O’Donovan
- Debbie A. Douglas
- Bronwyn D. A. Drainie
- Deantha Rae Edmunds
- Jeffrey Mark Farber
- Deanne Fitzpatrick
- Louis Hugo Francescutti MSM
- Patricia Sybil Pritchard Fraser
- Tennys J. M. Hanson
- Gen. Raymond Roland Henault CMM MSC CD (Ret'd)
- Lorne Henry Hepworth SOM
- Victor Peter Hetmanczuk
- John Pearson Hirdes
- Lillie Johnson OOnt
- Timothy Robert Jones
- Richard Kroeker
- Gary Alan Kulesha
- Carol Anne Lee OBC
- Francine Lemire
- André Leon Lewis OM MSM
- Kim Thúy Ly Thanh CQ
- George Edward MacDonald
- Susan Margaret Macpherson
- Medhat Sabet Mahdy
- Lois McDonall
- Noella Maria Milne OOnt
- Deborah McColl Money
- Osama El-Sayed Moselhi
- Nikita James Nanos
- John Andrew Olthuis
- Linda M. Perry
- André Pierre Picard
- Bruce Godfrey Pollock
- Bryan Earl Prince
- Shannon Beth Prince
- Joel Andrew Quarrington
- Arun Ravindran
- James M. Richards OMC
- Martine Monique Roy
- Lino A. Saputo
- Josef Meier Spatz
- George Mark Paul Stroumboulopoulos
- Maia-Mari Sutnik
- David Kin-Kay U
- Zainub Verjee
- Flavio Volpe
- Joe Brock Average OBC
- Vickie Elaine Baracos
- Christi Marlene Belcourt
- David Gordon Ben
- Daniel Georges Bichet
- Bill Bissett
- John Allan Cairns OBC
- Mark Joseph Cameron MB MSM
- Pierre Chastenay
- Edward Herman Cole
- John Terry Copp
- Rev. Michael Creal
- Budhendranauth Doobay OOnt
- Nima Gyaltsen Dorjee
- Elder Jane Rose Dragon ONWT
- Marcelle Dubois
- Leonard John Edwards MSM
- Lee Edward Errett OOnt
- Brian Ross Evans
- William Anthony Fox
- Janine Elizabeth Fuller
- Rosemary Burns Ganley
- Arnie Gelbart
- Franklyn Griffiths
- Sylvia D. Hamilton ONS
- Madeleine D. Humer
- Jane Knott Hungerford OBC
- Cpt. Sidney Joseph Hynes ONL
- William Janzen
- Tina Jones OM
- Christina Jean Keeper OM MSM
- Judy M. Kent
- William James Gordon Kirby
- James Gregory Kyte
- Patrick Joseph Lahey
- Hon. Susan Elizabeth Lang
- Barry Paul Lapointe
- Myrna Eunilda Lashley
- Avril R. Lavigne
- Pierre Legault MSM
- Brandt Channing Louie OBC
- Bruce A. Lourie
- Zoe N. Lucas
- Mother Pierre Anne Rosaria Mandato
- Bruno Gottfried Marti OBC
- Theresa Helen Matthias
- James David Meekison
- Richard Kelly Miskokomon
- Colleen Louise Murphy
- Joyce Napier
- Javaid Abbas Naqvi
- Robert Panet-Raymond CQ
- E. Michael Perley
- Dan Poenaru
- Linda Rabeneck
- Stephen James Randall
- Solomon Ratt SOM
- Jonathan Scott Rose
- Bibudhendra Sarkar
- Frances Marjorie Shaver
- Donald George Simpson
- Marvin R. V. Storrow OBC
- Jack Edward Taunton
- Charles E. Weaselhead

== Royal Victorian Order ==
Undress ribbon for all grades of the Royal Victorian Order

=== Lieutenant of the Royal Victorian Order ===
- Ian Donald McCowan, lately Secretary to the Governor-General of Canada

== Royal Victorian Medal ==
Undress ribbon of the Royal Victorian Medal

- Marion O'Brien. Housekeeper, Rideau Hall, Ottawa, Canada.

== Provincial Honours ==
=== National Order of Québec ===
==== Grand Officers of the National Order of Québec ====
Undress ribbon for a Grand Officer of the National Order of Québec

- None

==== Officers of the National Order of Québec ====
Undress ribbon for an Officer of the National Order of Québec

- Carl-Éric Aubin
- Louis-Marie Beaulieu
- Bernard Bélanger
- Aline Desjardins
- Yves Doutriaux
- Paul-Albert Iweins
- Régine Laurent
- Elliot Lifson
- Ginette Noiseux

==== Knight of the National Order of Québec ====
Undress ribbon for a Knight of the National Order of Québec

- Lynda Beaulieu
- Michel Bélanger
- Yves Bergeron
- Guy Berthiaume
- Frédéric Bouchard
- Jean-Luc Boulay
- Jacques Bourgault
- Véronique Cloutier
- Pierre Cossette
- Paul Lafleur
- Yvette Mollen
- Marie-Philip Poulin
- Gino Quilico
- Jacynthe Thériault
- Charles Tisseyre

=== Saskatchewan Order of Merit ===
- Chief Mark Arcand
- Brynn Boback-Lane
- Floyd Favel
- Dr. Thomas Hadjistavropoulos
- Renu Kapoor, SVM
- Curtis Kleisinger
- Hon. Brad Wall
- Col. Malcolm Young, CD
- Greg Yuel
- Olivia Yuel

=== Order of Ontario ===
- Zanana Akande
- Dr. Martin Antony
- Hon. Todd L. Archibald
- Lise Bourgeois
- Rudolph Bratty
- Marilyn Denis
- Nick Di Donato
- Brian Dunne
- Diane Dupuy, C.M.
- Dr. Jeremy Freeman
- Dr. Vivek Goel, C.M.
- Brian Gover
- Margery Holman
- Royson James
- Kevin Junor, M.M.M., C.D.
- Catherine Karakatsanis
- Winston Kassim, C.M.
- Dr. Danielle Lussier, Ph.D.
- Prof. Alejandro Marangoni, O.C., F.R.S.C.
- Mina Mawani
- Dr. Howard Ovens
- Jeanne-Lucille Pattison
- Poonam Puri
- Elizabeth Richer
- Dr. Jean Seely
- Walied Soliman
- Juliana Sprott
- Jennifer Suess
- Joseph Vitale

=== Order of British Columbia ===
- John Anderson
- Brenda Crabtree
- Karimah Es Sabar
- Howard Grant
- Lily Lee
- Don Mattrick
- William P.J. McCarthy
- Colin James
- Imant Raminsh, CM
- Elana Rosenfeld
- Gary Segal, CM
- Catherine Ulrich

=== Alberta Order of Excellence ===
- Don Begg
- Will Ferguson
- Robert Foster
- Catherine Fraser, KC
- Hon. Stephen Mandel
- Kim Reuther
- Nancy Southern
- Dr. Garnette Sutherland, CM

=== Order of Prince Edward Island ===
- Kathryn Dau-Schmidt
- Dr. Ed MacDonald, CM
- Reginald "Dutch" Thompson

=== Order of Manitoba ===
- Elder Mae Louise Campbell
- Hon. Murray Sinclair, CC
- Hon. Myrna Driedger
- Dr. Brent Roussin
- Dr. Marcia Anderson
- David Johnston
- Robert Paley
- Robert Williams
- Chad Swayze
- Michel D. Lagacé
- James Cohen
- Connie Walker

=== Order of New Brunswick ===
- Kassim Doumbia
- Carmen Gibbs
- Robert K. Irving
- John Leroux
- Karen O. Taylor

=== Order of Nova Scotia ===
- Dr. Afua Cooper
- Hon. J. Michael MacDonald
- Prof. Allan E. Marble
- Rob Sobey, C.D.
- Joseph Shannon, C.M.

=== Order of Newfoundland and Labrador ===
- Everard "Bud" Davidge
- Clifford R. George
- Liam Hickey
- Chief Mi’sel Muinjij Joe, C.M.
- Andy Jones, C.M.
- Patrick O'Callaghan
- Guy J. Poole
- Dr. Andrea M. Rose

== Territorial Honours ==
=== Order of Nunavut ===
The Order of Nunavut was not awarded in 2024.

=== Order of the Northwest Territories ===
- Tammy Roberts
- David Hurley

=== Order of Yukon ===
- Dr. Nesta Leduc
- Mary Sloan
- Rudy Couture
