= COVID-19 Immunity Task Force =

Canadian government task force

The COVID-19 Immunity Task Force (CITF) was one of the Government of Canada's early efforts to track the 2020 coronavirus pandemic. An external, dedicated secretariat was established in order to maximize the efficiency of the CITF's work. The group terminated its mandate on March 31, 2024.

The group terminated its mandate on March 31, 2024. During the four-year period, the CITF provided several purposes and uses for the general Canadian population.

== Purpose ==
The CITF was to use a serology "to survey representative samples of the population for the presence of antibodies to the virus". Trudeau's press release on 23 April 2020, on the initiation of the CCITF listed several goals it would help to achieve notably that it would:

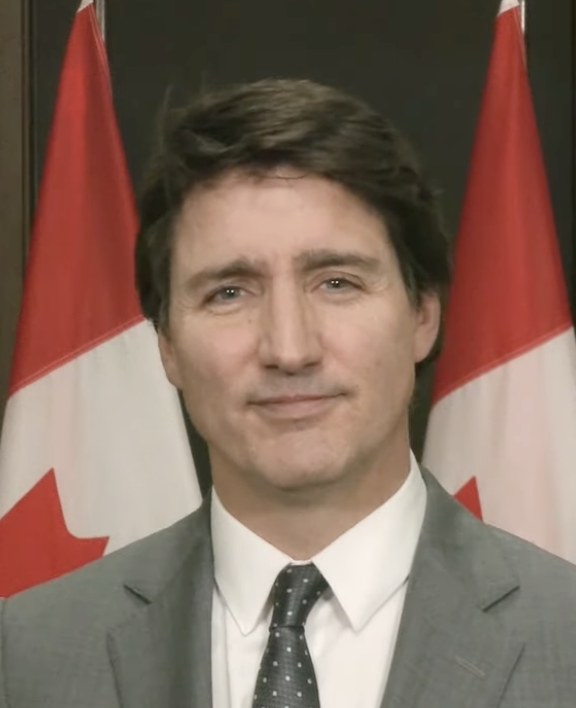
Canadian Prime Minister Justin Trudeau seen smiling in front of his country's flag

establish priorities and oversee the coordination of a series of country-wide blood test surveys that will tell us how widely the virus has spread in Canada and provide reliable estimates of potential immunity and vulnerabilities in Canadian populations.

Canada's government funded more than $1 billion for research into how to combat COVID-19 through the CITF.

- $40 million for the COVID-19 Genomics Network
- $23 million for the Vaccine and Infectious Disease Organization-International Vaccine Centre
- $29 million for the National Research Council of Canada
- $600 million through the Strategic Innovation Fund
- $10.3 million over 10 years, $5 million bonus to support the Canadian Immunization Research Network
- $114.9 million through the Canadian Institutes of Health Research

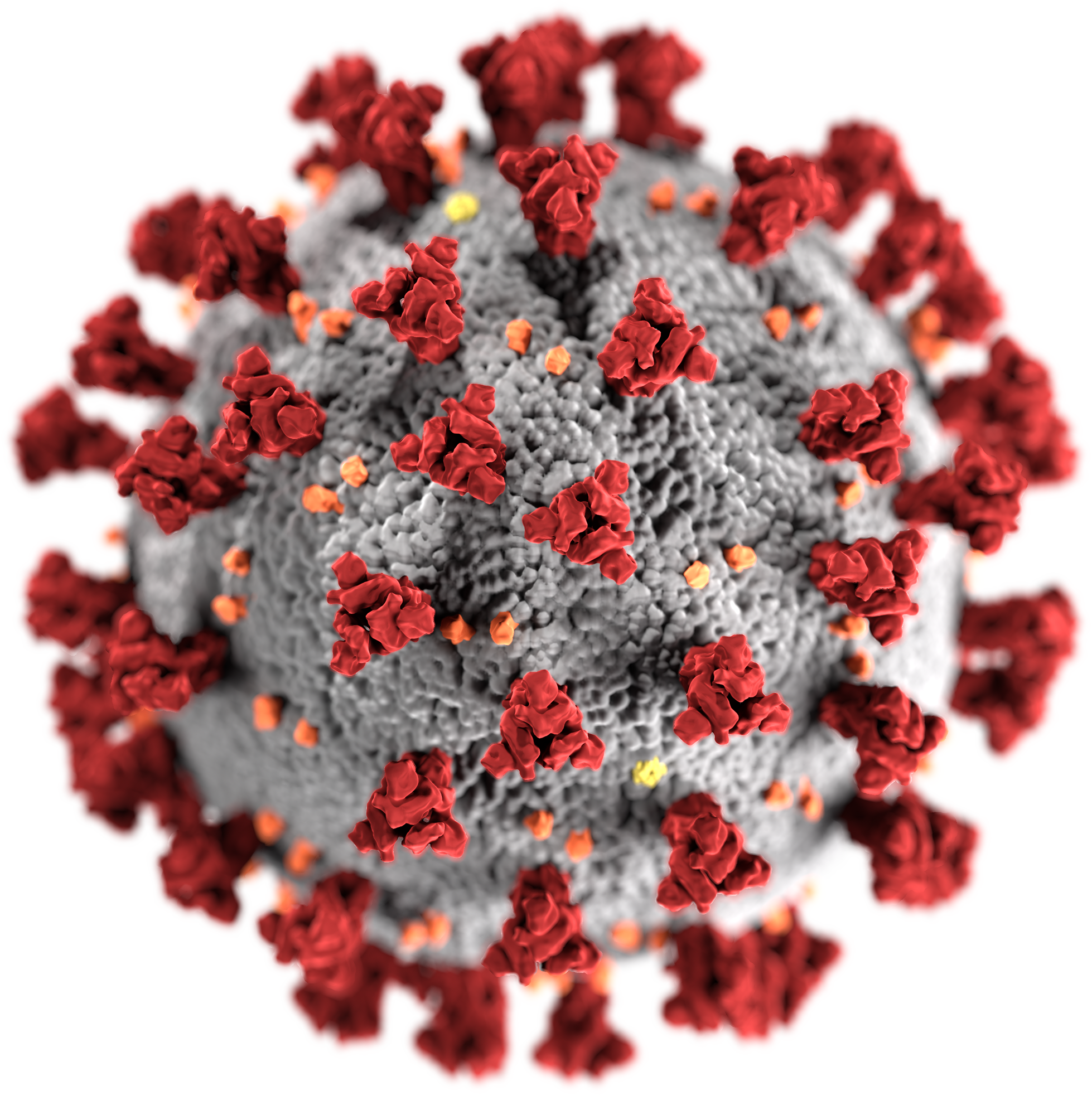
SARS-CoV-2 strand

A Vaccine Surveillance Reference Group (VSRG) was also established within the CITF to monitor the safety and effectiveness of COVID-19 vaccines made available in Canada.

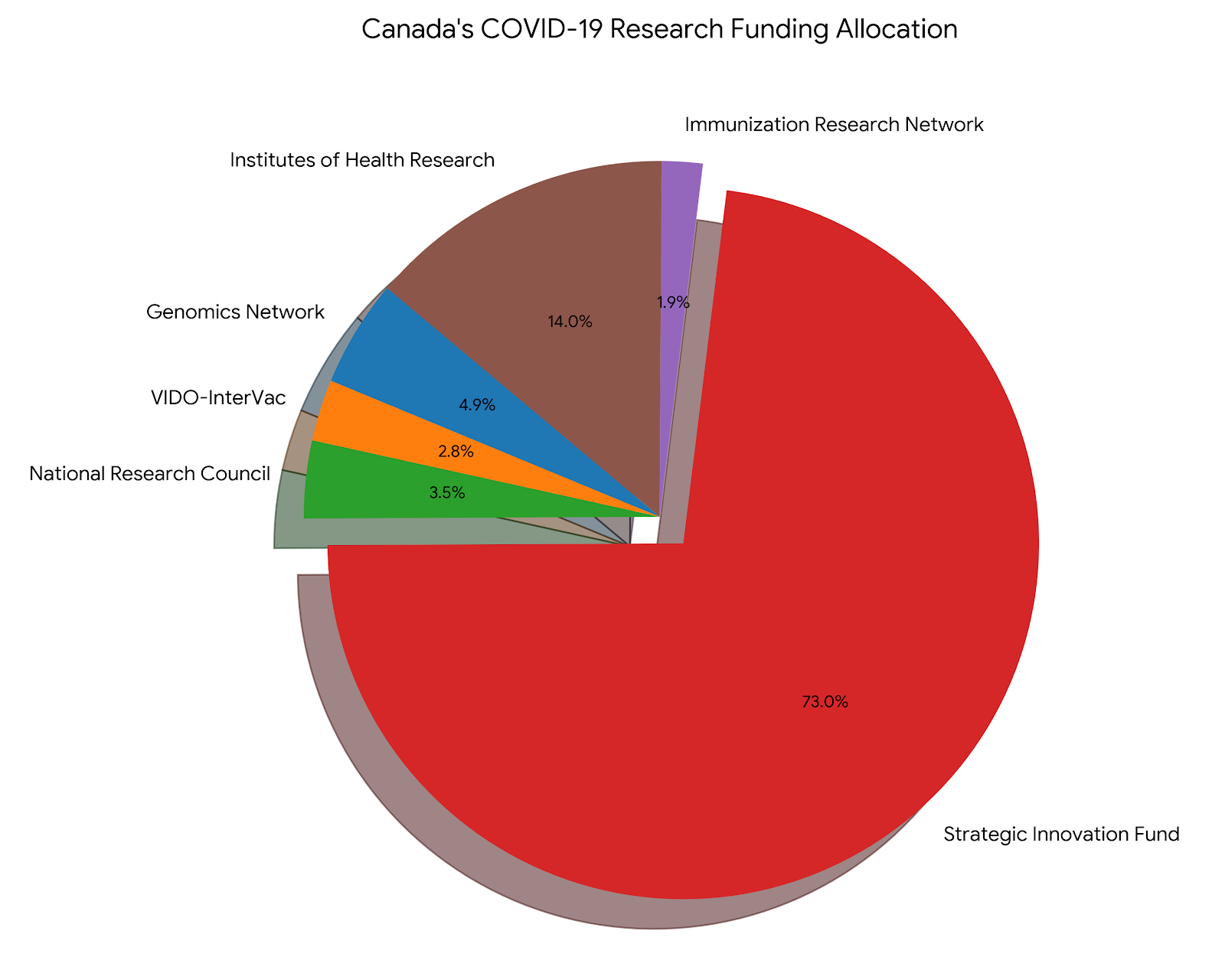
A pie chart showing the allocation of funds Trudeau put into each sector of the CITF.

The task force was to also estimate how many Canadians were immune to the SARS-CoV-2 virus.

== Findings ==
Catherine Hankins reported that less than 1% of 10,000 samples tested positive for antibodies to SARS-CoV-2.

The CITF also found that one in 100 Canadians were infected with COVID-19 during the first wave of the pandemic.

Canadian Blood Services analyzed over 30,000 blood samples in total.

== Task Force membership ==
The CITF Board was composed of doctors, infectious disease experts, and policy makers.

=== Leadership Group ===
Executive Committee

- David Naylor, Co-chair
  - Wrote "Learning from SARS" in 2003, a 200-page report on Canada's response to the SARS outbreak from 2002-2004.
- Catherine Hankins, Co-chair
  - Deputy Medical Officer of Health at Calgary Health Services
  - Helped identify E. Coli in uncooked hamburger, sent 49 samples to an Edmonton lab during the AIDS pandemic
- Timothy Evans, Executive Director
  - Senior Director of Health, Nutrition and Population Global Practice at the World Bank Group
- Heather Hannah
- Mona Nemer
- Howard Njoo
- Gina Ogilvie
- Jutta Preiksaitis
- Gail Tomblin Murphy
- Paul Van Caeseele

Government of Canada representatives

- Theresa Tam, Chief Public Health Officer of Canada
- Mona Nemer, Chief Science Advisor of Canada
- Stephen Lucas, Deputy Minister of Health of Canada

Members

The CCITF leadership group expanded on 2 May 2020. Its additional members as of March 2022 are:

- Carrie Bourassa
- Vivek Goel
- Philippe Gros
- Scott Halperin
- Charu Kaushic
- James D. Kellner
- Susan Kirkland
- Gary Kobinger
- Mel Krajden
- Christie Lutsiak
- Richard Massé
- Allison McGeer
- Deborah Money
- Kevin Orrell
- Jutta Preiksaitis
- Caroline Quach-Thanh (former)
- James Talbot (former)

Provincial & Territorial representatives

- Shelly Bolotin, Ontario
- Marguerite Cameron, Prince Edward Island
- Catherine Elliott, Yukon
- Richard Garceau, New Brunswick
- Heather Hannah, Northwest Territories
- Mel Krajden, British Columbia
- Christie Lutsiak, Alberta
- Richard Massé, Quebec
- Jessica Minion, Saskatchewan
- Michael Patterson, Nunavut
- Gail Tomblin Murphy, Nova Scotia
- Paul Van Caeseele, Manitoba
