= HIV/AIDS prophylaxis in British Columbia =

In January 2018, the provincial government of British Columbia (BC) began providing individuals at high risk of HIV infection with pre-exposure prophylaxis (PrEP) and post-exposure prophylaxis (PEP) at no cost. High risk individuals include men and trans women who have sex with men, people who inject drugs, and people who have sex with people living with HIV. One year following this policy change, which is delivered as part of the British Columbia Centre for Excellence in HIV/AIDS (BC-CfE)'s Drug Treatment Program, almost 3,300 people have been prescribed with PrEP or PEP.

The steps for obtaining PrEP in BC are as follows: speaking to a physician, getting some medical tests, enrolling and being given a prescription, and refilling the prescription. The effort was undertaken to better support the UNAIDS "90-90-90: treatment for all" targets.

== HIV/AIDS in British Columbia ==
As part of the global HIV/AIDS epidemic, BC experienced two distinct periods of rapid incidence growth rate. The first was in the 1980s among men who have sex with men, and the second was in the 1990s among injection drug users. At its peak in 1987, the rate of new HIV diagnoses in BC was roughly 31 cases per 100,000 population. The BC HIV incidence rate decreased thereafter and it was not until 2010 that the BC HIV incidence rate was less than the Canadian HIV incidence rate (7 per 100,000 population). As of 2017, the rate of new HIV cases reported in BC was 3.8 per 100,000 population.

=== Current state ===
As summarized in the BC Centre for Disease Control's Annual Surveillance Report, rates of new HIV cases differ based on location, gender, ethnicity, sexual orientation, and intravenous drug use. In addition to new HIV cases being highest in the Vancouver Coastal and Island Health Authorities, they were also highest among males, Caucasians (43% of new cases), gay, bisexual and other men who have sex with men (gbMSM), and among people who inject drugs. The dramatic decrease in new HIV cases among people who inject drugs is the main reason why the overall rate of new HIV cases has decreased. With an incidence rate of 182 cases, there are approximately 7,200 people living with HIV in BC.

== Policy effects ==
This policy has expanded access to preventative HIV medication in British Columbia. Individuals at high risk of contracting HIV can apply to receive PrEP no cost. The out-of-pocket cost of emtricitabine/tenofovir, a medication used to prevent HIV, was previously between $250 and $1,000 per month. Because the BC-CfE was able to negotiate a lower price with manufacturers of generic versions of Truvada, the program is able to offer the drug at no cost for high risk individuals. In its first six months, the program cost the BC government around $300,000. Of the nearly 3,300 people being prescribed PrEP through this new policy, 98.4% are male, 0.5% are female, and 1.1% identify as transgender, unspecified, or another form of gender identity. Provincial health authorities estimate that once the program has 5,000 participants, the rate of new HIV cases in BC will fall by 83% by 2026.

Another positive consequence is an uptake in the number of PEP kits being used. Between 2017 and 2018 there was a 23% increase in the number of PEP kit initiations, bringing the number of kit initiations up to 400.

There are also potential long-term savings to government through reduced healthcare costs. By preventing HIV infections, the BC government will save on the lifetime cost of antiretroviral therapy drugs and hospital costs for HIV/AIDS-related treatment. In the German setting, investing in PrEP coverage has a projected savings of €5.1 billion Euros over a 40-year period. In the United States, the medical cost savings for each case of HIV prevented is roughly US$229,800.

== Coverage in other areas of Canada ==
- Alberta: Starting October 2018, full coverage for generic versions of PrEP are available for individuals with Alberta Health Care and individuals that meet the eligibility criteria.
- Saskatchewan: Starting April 2018, PrEP is available at no cost to all Saskatchewan residents.
- Manitoba: As of May 2024, PrEP is available at no cost to all Manitoba residents.
- Ontario: People that can access free PrEP coverage in Ontario include those with a federal insurance plan, people under the age of 25 through the OHIP+ program, and individuals over 65 who are on the Ontario Disability Support Program or Ontario Works.
- Quebec: In Quebec there is no program that offers free coverage for PrEP; rather, the price is indexed according to a person's income. If prescribed to Quebec Health Insurance Plan (RAMQ), PrEP will cost roughly $87 per month.
- Nova Scotia: Starting July 2018, PrEP is available as a benefit under provincial Pharmacare. Income level and the type of Pharmacare program an individual is enrolled in will determine the amount of coverage.
- New Brunswick: PrEP may be covered for those on the New Brunswick Drug Plan.
- Newfoundland and Labrador: PrEP is a listed benefit in the Newfoundland and Labrador drug plan formulary.
- Prince Edward Island: PrEP is available at no cost to all P.E.I. residents.
- Yukon: PrEP is available at no cost to all Yukon residents as of January 2021.
- Northwest Territories: Coverage for PrEP is only available through the Non-Insured Health Benefits (NIHB) Program".
- Nunavut: Coverage for PrEP is only available through the Non-Insured Health Benefits (NIHB) Program".

== Other considerations ==
=== Safe sex ===
Since PrEP only protects against HIV and does not protect against blood-borne infections (e.g., hepatitis C) or other STIs (e.g., herpes, syphilis, chlamydia, gonorrhoea), there is concern that increasing access to PrEP may increase rates of sexually transmitted infections by encouraging fewer safe sex practices like condom use. Others find evidence that suggests access to PrEP actually decreases the number of sexual partners and the number of men reporting unprotected anal sex.

=== Barriers to access ===
Another policy consideration is potential barriers to access. Of current prescribers, 88% pick their medication up directly from St. Paul's hospital while 12% have the medication shipped to their physician's office outside of Vancouver. While the bulk of the program participants live in Metro Vancouver, there is ongoing concern that physician knowledge and access to primary care physicians in areas outside of Metro Vancouver are preventing access. To sign up for the program, a potential participant needs to have a physician submit a form on their behalf to the BC-CfE. Not everyone at risk of contracting HIV has a primary care physician or a physician they feel comfortable enough talking with about their sexual activity and previous drug use. Also, some physicians refuse to fill out the prescription, citing process complexity or instead suggesting the person engage in fewer risky behaviours.
