= Sharon Walmsley =

Canadian HIV researcher, educator and clinician

- Born: 1957 (age 68–69); Canada

Academic background
- Education: MD, 1983, Schulich School of Medicine and Dentistry; MSc, 1998, University of Toronto
- Thesis: A randomized trial of the use of N-acetylcysteine for the prevention of trimethoprim-sulfamethoxazole hypersensitivity reactions when used for the prevention of pneumocystis carinii pneumonia in patients with human immunodeficiency virus infection (1998)

Academic work
- Institutions: University Health Network; University of Toronto
- Main interests: HIV/AIDS

Sharon Lynn Walmsley FCAHS CM (born 1957) is a Canadian HIV researcher, educator, and clinician. She is a professor in the Temerty Faculty of Medicine at the University of Toronto and Senior Scientist at Toronto General Hospital.

== Early life and education ==
Walmsley was born in 1957. After completing her medical degree at Western University's Schulich School of Medicine and Dentistry, Walmsley began interning at Wellesley Hospital. She encountered Toronto's first HIV/AIDS patient on her first night as an intern in 1983, which started her interest in the virus. Hillar Vellend, the Chief of Infectious Diseases at the Toronto General Hospital (TGH), consulted on the case and encouraged Walmsley to pursue HIV/AIDS research as a career.

== Career ==
Following the AIDS crisis of the 1980s, Walmsley oversaw the testing of antiretroviral drugs to improve the life expectancy of those with the disease. She joined TGH as a clinician-researcher in 1992 and helped establish Canada's first dedicated HIV/AIDS clinic. In 2006, Walmsley was recognized by Pride Toronto for her efforts in combating HIV/AIDS.

Walmsley was named a Member of the Order of Canada in 2017 "for her advancement of HIV/AIDS research that has led to a broader understanding of the disease's effects on women as well as to improved treatment options." During the COVID-19 pandemic, Walmsley became the principal investigator of the study SafeTy and Efficacy of Preventative COVID Vaccines (STOP-CoV). The purpose of the study was to investigate the effect of COVID-19 vaccines on producing antibodies that protect against the COVID-19 virus and any new variants. She was later elected a Fellow of the Canadian Academy of Health Sciences for research in HIV/AIDS, and in particular aging and issues around long-term care with HIV.

== Personal life ==
Walmsley is married to architect Bruce Hinds.
