= Robert Brunham =

Robert Brunham may refer to:

- Robert Brunham (politician), member of parliament for Bishop's Lynn (now King's Lynn) in Norfolk, England, 1402 and 1417
- Robert C. Brunham, Canadian infectious disease specialist
