= Fiona Brinkman =

Canadian medical researcher

Fiona S. L. Brinkman
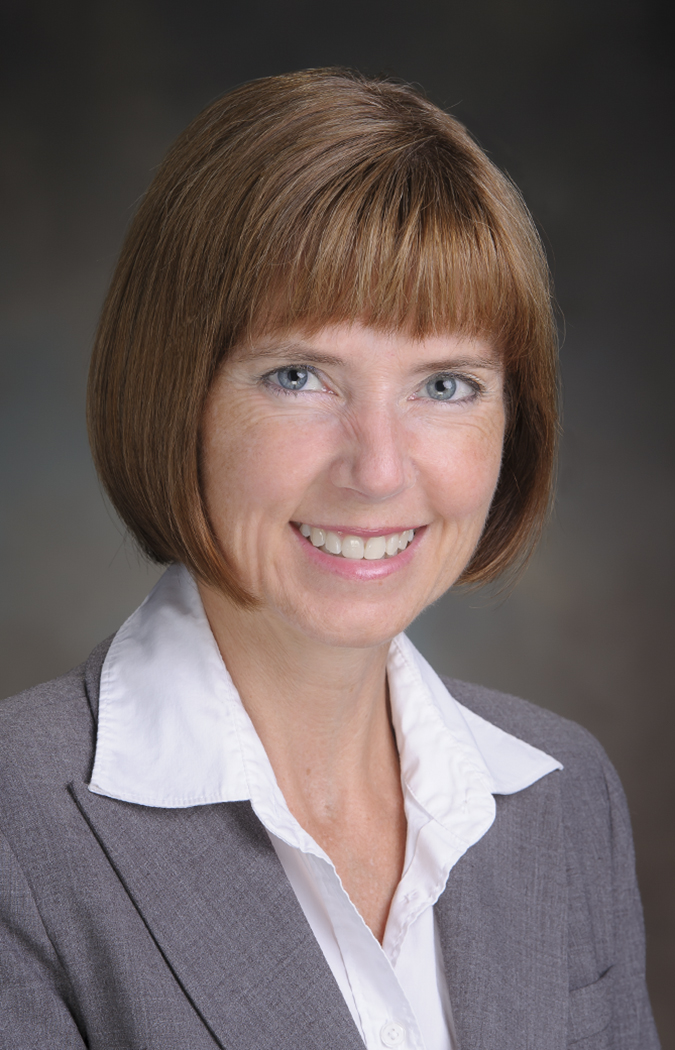
- Brinkman in 2013
- Born: Fiona Susan Lillian Lawson Brinkman; 1967 (age 58–59); Melbourne, Australia
- Education: University of Waterloo (BSc); University of Ottawa (PhD)
- Known for: PSORTb; IslandViewer; OrtholugeDB; Pseudomonas genome database
- Awards: Fellow of the Royal Society of Canada (2018); MIT Technology Review TR100 (2002)
- Scientific career
- Fields: Bioinformatics, Microbial genomics, Microbiology
- Workplaces: Simon Fraser University
- Doctoral advisor: Jo-Anne Dillon

Fiona Brinkman (née Lawson) is a professor in Bioinformatics and Genomics in the Department of Molecular Biology and Biochemistry at Simon Fraser University in British Columbia, Canada, and is a leader in the area of microbial bioinformatics. She is interested in developing "more sustainable, holistic approaches for infectious disease control and conservation of microbiomes".

== Education ==
Brinkman received her B.Sc. in Biochemistry from the University of Waterloo in 1990 and earned her Ph.D. under the supervision of Dr. Jo-Anne Dillon at the University of Ottawa in 1996. She completed two post-doctorate fellowships at the University of British Columbia under the guidance of Drs Robert (Bob) Hancock and Ann Rose. Though originally trained as a microbiologist, she developed an interest in bioinformatics throughout her graduate and postdoctoral studies, combining the fields when she started her own group focused on pathogen/microbial bioinformatics at Simon Fraser University in 2001.

== Research ==
Brinkman's current research interests center around improving understanding of how microbes evolve and improving computational methods that aid the analysis of microbes and the development of new vaccines, drugs and diagnostics for infectious diseases. Increasingly her methods have been applied for more environmental applications. She is noted for developing PSORTb, the most precise method available for computational protein subcellular localization prediction and the first computational method that exceeded the accuracy of some common high-throughput laboratory methods for such subcellular localization analysis. This method aids the prediction of cell surface and secreted proteins in a bacterial cell that may be suitable drug targets, vaccine components or diagnostics. She has also developed bioinformatics methods that aid the more accurate identification of genomic islands (i.e. IslandViewer) and orthologs (i.e. OrtholugeDB). Her research has provided new insights into the evolution of pathogens and the role that horizontal gene transfer and genomic islands play. She confirmed the anecdotal assumption that virulence factors (disease-causing genes in pathogens) are disproportionately associated with genomic islands. She was among the first researchers to use whole genome sequencing to aid infectious disease outbreak investigations ("genomic epidemiology"), integrating genome sequence data with social network analysis. She was involved in the Pseudomonas Genome Project and is the coordinator of the Pseudomonas genome database, a database of Pseudomonas species genomic data and associated annotations that is continually updated. She has also developed databases (i.e. InnateDB and the Allergy and Asthma Portal) to aid more systems-based analysis of immune disorders and the immune response to infections in humans and other animals - databases that have aided the identification of new immune-modulating therapeutics. She has a growing interest in applying her methods to environmental applications as part of a broader interest in developing approaches for more holistic, sustainable infectious disease control and microbiome conservation - developing approaches that may select less for antimicrobial resistance, improve the tracking of pathogens and their origins, and better factor in the important role of societal changes and the environment in shaping microbiomes.

== Awards ==
- Fellow, Royal Society of Canada (2018)
- Thomson Reuter's Highly Cited Researcher (2014)
- Women's Executive Network – Canada's Top 100 – Trendsetters and Trailblazers (2009)
- Canadian Society of Microbiologists Fisher Award (2007)
- Michael Smith Foundation for Health Research Senior Scholar (2007–2012)
- Canadian Institutes of Health Research New Investigator (2005–2010)
- Canadian Who's Who (2005)
- Canada's Top 40 Under 40 (2003)
- Innovation and Science Council of British Columbia (now the BC Innovation Council) Young Innovator Award (2003)
- MIT Technology Review TR100 (2002) as one of the top 100 innovators in the world under the age of 35
- Michael Smith Foundation for Health Research Scholar (2001–2006)

== Professional service ==
Brinkman has a long-standing interest in bioinformatics training, improving the curation of biological/bioinformatics data, and developing effective bioinformatics data standards and databases including the Pseudomonas aeruginosa Community Annotation Project and Pseudomonas Genome Database.

She chairs the Scientific Advisory Board for The European Nucleotide Archive (EMBL-EBI) and serves as a member of several other boards, including the Genome Canada Board of Directors and the Scientific Advisory Board for REACTOME. Brinkman also co-leads the Integrated Rapid Infectious Disease Analysis (IRIDA) Project and Consortium and is a founding member of the Genomic Epidemiology Ontology (GenEpiO) Consortium and the Food Ontology (FoodOn) Group.

In the Vancouver academic community, Brinkman currently serves as the co-director of the Bioinformatics Graduate Training Program run through Simon Fraser University, the University of British Columbia, and the BC Cancer Agency and as the SFU representative for the Canadian Society of Microbiologists. She is a Core Faculty Member for the Canadian Bioinformatics Workshops.

Notable graduates from her lab include Jennifer Gardy.

== Personal biography ==
The daughter of Scottish parents, Brinkman was born in Melbourne, Australia, in 1967. She immigrated to Canada as a child where she grew up primarily in Mississauga, Ontario. Brinkman lives in Coquitlam with her family, including a son and a daughter.

== See also ==
- List of University of Waterloo people
