= Lauren Meyers =

American integrative biologist

- Citizenship: American
- Education: Harvard University (BS); Stanford University (PhD)
- Scientific career
- Fields: Biology
- Workplaces: University of Texas at Austin
- Doctoral advisor: Marcus W. Feldman

Lauren Ancel Meyers is an American integrative biologist who holds the Denton A. Cooley Centennial Professorship in Zoology at the University of Texas at Austin and membership in the Santa Fe Institute External Faculty. Since 2022, she has served as an elected member of the Harvard Board of Overseers.

== Career ==
Meyers earned her Bachelor of Arts degree, magna cum laude, in mathematics and philosophy at Harvard University (1996) and her PhD in biological sciences at Stanford University (2000). She then did post-doctoral work with the National Science Foundation for two years.

Meyers specializes in network epidemiology and works in conjunction with the Centers for Disease Control and Prevention and other agencies on diseases such as COVID-19, pandemic influenza, Ebola, HIV, Swine flu, and Zika. When the COVID-19 pandemic appeared she quickly realized it presented a unique danger and had long feared about such a pandemic. Her team formed the COVID-19 Modeling Consortium and coordinates with the White House Coronavirus Task Force. Meyers and other epidemiologists knew that the 2009 swine flu pandemic could have been much worse and that much better preparations for a future pandemic were needed. She is concerned that people will not take necessary precautions for the COVID-19 pandemic. Her team discovered that every day of delay in implementing social distancing measures added 2.4 days to the length of an outbreak. On 30 June 2020, she predicted that without major and quick behavior change at least some locales will require a Stage 5 (red) shutdown. Meyers emphasizes that COVID-19 does spread silently. Meyers further states that trait of COVID-19, coupled with its rapid transmission interval, only an average of 4 days, makes COVID-19 very dangerous. By comparison, this is very different from SARS, which has an 8-day transmission interval and is more visible.

== Academic positions ==
- Director, University of Texas at Austin (UT) COVID-19 Modeling Consortium (2020-)
- Professor, Department of Integrative Biology and Department of Statistics & Data Science, UT (2011-)
- Founding Chair, Department of Statistics & Data Science, UT (2011-2014)
- Associate Professor, Integrative Biology, UT(2007-2011)
- Associate Director, Division of Statistics and Scientific Computation, UT (2008-2010)
- Assistant Professor, Integrative Biology, UT (2003-2007)
- External Faculty, Santa Fe Institute (SFI), Santa Fe, New Mexico (2003- )
- NSF Postdoctoral Fellow at Emory University (Advisor: Bruce Levin) and SFI (2000-2002)

== Honors and awards ==
- Denton A. Cooley Centennial Professorship, UT (2018- )
- Joseph Lieberman Award for Significant Contributions to Science (2017)
- William H. and Gladys G. Reeder Faculty Fellow, UT (2011-2013, 2016–2018)
- Fellow, University of Texas Institute for Molecular and Cellular Biology (2006-2010, 2014–2015)
- Center for Excellence in Education - Excellence and Achievement Award (2013)
- Donald D. Harrington Faculty Fellowship, UT (2010-2011)
- College of Natural Sciences Teaching Excellence Award, UT (2005)
- MIT Technology Review TR100: One of 100 Top Global Innovators Under 35 (2004)
- National Science Foundation Postdoctoral Fellowship in Biological Informatics (2000-2002)
- Santa Fe Institute Postdoctoral Fellowship (2000-2002)
- Samuel Karlin Prize for Ph.D. Thesis in Mathematical Biology (2000)
- Steinmetz Fellowship, Santa Fe Institute (1999)
- National Defense Science & Engineering Graduate Fellowship (1996-1999)
- U.S. Congressional National Science Scholar (1991-1995)

== Education ==
- Emory University and Santa Fe Institute, National Science Foundation Postdoctoral Fellow, 2000-2002
- Stanford University, PhD, 1996-2000
- Harvard University, BA, 1991-1996

== Selected publications ==
- Lauren Ancel Meyers; Babak Pourbohloul; M E J Newman; Danuta M Skowronski; Robert C Brunham (2005). "Network theory and SARS: predicting outbreak diversity". Journal of Theoretical Biology. 232 (1): 71–81. doi:10.1016/j.jtbi.2004.07.026. PMC 7094100. PMID 15498594. Zbl 1442.92174. Wikidata Q39698246.
- J. Arjan G M. de Visser; Joachim Hermisson; Günter P. Wagner; et al. (2003). "Perspective: Evolution and detection of genetic robustness". Evolution. 57 (9): 1959–1972. doi:10.1111/j.0014-3820.2003.tb00377.x. PMID 14575319. Wikidata Q34271971.
- Shweta Bansal; Bryan T Grenfell; Lauren Ancel Meyers (2007). "When individual behaviour matters: homogeneous and network models in epidemiology". Journal of the Royal Society Interface. 4 (16): 879–91. doi:10.1098/rsif.2007.1100. PMC 2394553. PMID 17640863. Wikidata Q28754461.
