= Sarah B. Henderson =

Canadian environmental health scientist

- Education: Ph.D. University of British Columbia BA.Sc. University of British Columbia
- Scientific career
- Fields: environmental health, fire
- Workplaces: Environmental Health Services, BC Centre for Disease Control
- Website: http://www.spph.ubc.ca/person/sarah-henderson/

Sarah B. Henderson (born January 8, 1978) is a senior environmental health scientist at the British Columbia Centre for Disease Control and a public health professor at the University of British Columbia.

== Early life and education ==
Henderson was born in Toronto, Ontario, and excelled in math and science classes which led to pursue scientific fields later in life. Henderson earned a bachelor of applied science (BASc) from the University of British Columbia in 2000, focusing on environmental engineering. She worked in the field of pollution control and reduction. She also worked in Uganda developing gravity fed water systems before earning her Ph.D. Henderson then switched her focus from environmental engineering to environmental epidemiology and earned a PhD from University of British Columbia in 2009.

== Research and career ==
As the senior environmental health scientist at the BC Centre for Disease Control, Henderson leads in research focused on environmental health and safety, including air pollution from wildfires, and extreme weather events that is then applied for policy within British Columbia. Her most recognized research has projected the health impacts, including respiratory and cardiovascular health, and global mortality impacts, as a result of smoke exposure from wildfires. The research on global mortality impacts was the culmination of her post doctorate work and brought wildfire smoke into perspective on the global scale. Some of her more current research has focused on improving the methods to predict the minimum height of forest fire smoke within the atmosphere, including using machine learning and data from the CALIPSO satellite to better assess population exposure to forest fire smoke. She has also researched the comparative health impacts of smoke from wild versus prescribed fires, in order to better understand the health impacts of varying smoke regimes.

=== Public engagement ===
Henderson has spoken on a variety of news outlets, including CityNews Vancouver and CBC News Network, informing viewers about the health precautions they should take because of poor air quality from wildfires. She has advised those with pre-existing conditions (including asthma, and COPD), pregnant women, young children, and the elderly to take extra care because they will have a harder time breathing the smokier air. Henderson has suggested precautions such as spending time in clean air shelters, such as community centers, shopping malls, and libraries, or investing in an air cleaner for your house.

== Selected publications ==
- Application of land use regression to estimate long-term concentrations of traffic-related nitrogen oxides and fine particulate matter in Environmental science & technology, 2007
- Estimated global mortality attributable to smoke from landscape fires, in Environmental health perspectives, 2012
- Temporal stability of land use regression models for traffic-related air pollution R Wang, SB Henderson, H Sbihi, RW Allen, M Brauer – Atmospheric Environment, 2013
- Three measures of forest fire smoke exposure and their associations with respiratory and cardiovascular health outcomes in a population-based cohort, in Environmental Health Perspectives, 2011
- Correlation between co-exposures to noise and air pollution from traffic sources, in Occupational and Environmental Medicine, 2009
- Exposure assessment for estimation of the global burden of disease attributable to outdoor air pollution, in Environmental Science & Technology, 2012
- Extreme air pollution events from bushfires and dust storms and their association with mortality in Sydney, Australia 1994–2007, in Environmental Research, 2011

== Awards and recognition ==
Named a Leader in Fire Science for her notable work on health impacts and mortality rates as related to smoke exposure, as related to forest fires.
