= Mel Krajden =

Canadian physician

Mel Krajden OBC is a Canadian physician who is a professor of pathology and laboratory medicine at the University of British Columbia in Vancouver, British Columbia. He is the medical director of the BCCDC Public Health Laboratory. Krajden obtained his BSc, MD, and FRCPC (Internal Medicine) at McGill University, followed by a fellowship in Infectious Diseases at Stanford University. He is also the medical director of the Public Health Laboratory at the British Columbia Centre for Disease Control. His research focuses on the prevention and care of hepatitis, human papillomavirus, and human immunodeficiency virus.

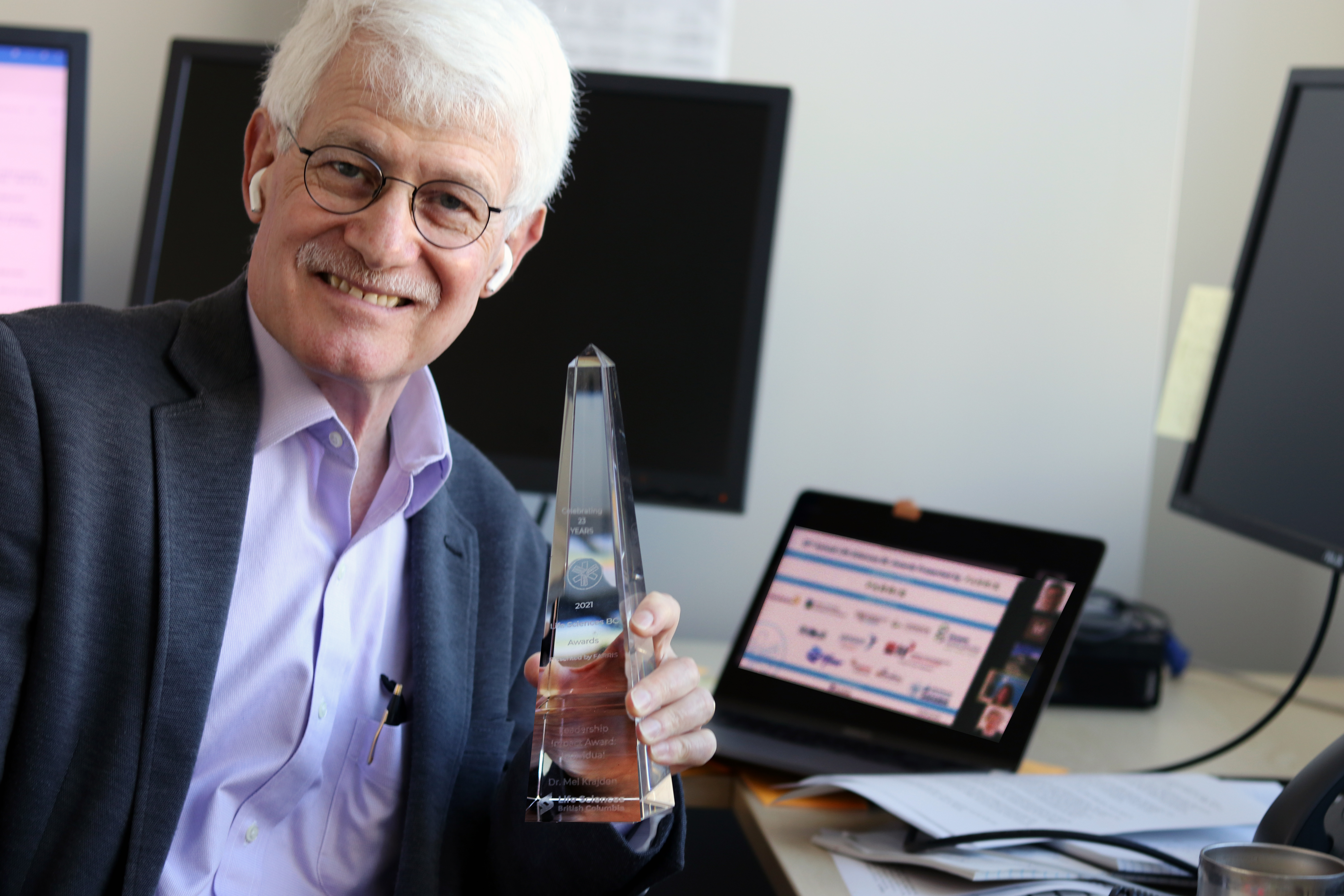
Krajden was awarded Life Sciences BC's Individual Leadership Impact Award on September 23, 2021, for exceptional leadership in addressing COVID-19's unique pandemic challenges.

During the COVID-19 pandemic, Krajden played a key leadership role in Canada's public health response. Under his direction, the BC Centre for Disease Control, Public Health Laboratory, developed an accredited COVID-19 test within 10 days of the SARS-CoV-2 genome being released. He was a leading member of the national government's COVID-19 Immunity Task Force. He led many COVID-19 research projects including:

- RESPOND in February 2020 to sequence the SARS-COV-2 genome from Genome British Columbia, part of Genome Canada,
- R2ESPOND, a Canadian Institutes of Health Research funded project to research to link between genomic and heath outcomes for COVID-19 infections
- EXPands, a project to address the world-wide reagent shortage at the beginning of the pandemic critical for patient testing to create reagents that could be validated in a College of American Pathologists accredited laboratory, and produced in scale meet the growing testing needs in British Columbia,
- a project to link transmission metadata to viral genotype and serological responses of COVID-19,
- SAfER a return-to-work study that tracked and collected data over time on infection, immunity, contacts, and clinical symptoms for 1,500 volunteer employees at BC based biotechnology companies,

Krajden was also a collaborator on many COVID-19 research projects, including: COVID-19 Germline Analysis, Immunological research on antibody and cell-mediated responses, examining the biological properties of Variants of Concern and well therapeutics work, the role ACEII plays, and, the infection rate of COVID-19 in children and youths.

Krajden serves on Health Canada's Expert Advisory Committee on Blood Regulation and Expert Advisory Committee on Cells, Tissues, and Organs. His role on these is because of his "expertise in medical microbiology, immunology, internal medicine and infectious diseases". Krajden is also the Treasurer of the Association of Medical Microbiology and Infectious Disease Canada.

In addition to more than 400 publications in peer-reviewed journals, Krajden has been quoted in the lay press on subjects such as human metapneumovirus, and SARS.

Krajden was appointed as a member of the Order of British Columbia in 2020.
