= Gina Ogilvie =

Canadian public health researcher

Academic background
- Education: MSc, clinical epidemiology, 2001, University of British Columbia; DrPH, 2012, UNC Gillings School of Global Public Health; MD, McMaster University
- Thesis: Trends in care for HIV positive pregnant women in British Columbia, 1994-1999 (2001)

Gina Suzanne Ogilvie is a Canadian global and public health physician. She is a Tier 1 Canada Research Chair in Global Control of HPV related diseases and prevention, and Professor at the University of British Columbia in their School of Population and Public Health.

== Early life and education ==
Ogilvie received her medical degree from McMaster University where she also completed a speciality in Family Medicine and a fellowship in Population Health and Primary care. Prior to this, she also earned her Masters of Science degree at the University of British Columbia (UBC) and her Doctorate in Public Health from the UNC Gillings School of Global Public Health.

== Career ==
Upon receiving her Doctorate in Public Health in 2012, Ogilvie became a senior research advisor at B.C. Women's Hospital & Health Centre and assistant director of the Women's Health Research Institute. By 2015, she was the senior public health scientist and medical director at the British Columbia Centre for Disease Control and received a Tier 1 Canada Research Chair in Global Control of HPV related diseases and prevention at UBC's School of Population and Public Health. While continuing to work as a senior research advisor, she became the Principal Investigator for the QUEST HPV Study at the Vaccine Evaluation Center and Integrated Global Control of HPV Related Diseases and Cancer research program. In recognition of her work, she was the recipient of UNC's Michael S. O’Malley Alumni Award for Publication Excellence in Cancer Population Sciences.

In 2018, Ogilvie published a large-scale study titled “Effect of Screening with Primary Cervical HPV Testing vs Cytology Testing on High-grade Cervical Intraepithalial Neoplasia at 48 Months,” that showed a more effective cervical cancer screening than the conventional pap smear test. In the study, her research team found that liquid-based cytology screening for HPV was the most effective option. Following her study, Ogilvie received a $10 million grant from federal health minister Ginette Petitpas Taylor towards cervical cancer detection and vaccination. She also became the recipient of the 2018 YWCA Women of Distinction Award in the category of Research & the Sciences.

In 2020, Ogilvie received the University of British Columbia's Killam Research Prize in recognition of outstanding research and scholarly contributions. In 2021, Ogilvie and colleague Teresa Liu-Ambrose were elected to the Canadian Academy of Health Sciences
