= Agatha Jassem =

Canadian clinical microbiologist

- Education: University of British Columbia
- Occupation: clinical microbiologist

Agatha Jassem is a Canadian clinical microbiologist and the program head of the Virology Lab at the British Columbia Centre for Disease Control Public Health Laboratory, and a clinical associate professor in the Department of Pathology & Laboratory Medicine at the University of British Columbia in Vancouver, British Columbia, Canada.

Jassem obtained her PhD at the University of British Columbia, followed by a fellowship in Clinical Microbiology at the National Institutes of Health. Her research focuses the detection of healthcare-and community-associated infections, emerging pathogens, and drug resistance determinants.

During the COVID-19 pandemic response, Jassem led research efforts on COVID-19 breakthrough infections from vaccinated individuals, SARS-CoV-2 population level seroprevalence, antibody response as well as collaborating on research on securing reagents for COVID-19 during world-wide shortages, and the role of ACEII.
