= Catherine Hankins =

Canadian epidemiologist

- Born: 1949 (age 76–77); Alberta, Canada

Academic background
- Education: BA, MD, University of Calgary; MSc, London School of Hygiene and Tropical Medicine; PhD, University of Amsterdam

Catherine Anita Hankins OC (born 1949) is a Canadian epidemiologist. Hankins was the Deputy Medical Officer of Health at Calgary Health Services before accepting a faculty position at McGill University.

== Early life and education ==
Hankins was born in 1949. She earned her Bachelor of Arts degree in French and medical degree from the University of Calgary. In recognition of her contributions to AIDS research, the institution recognized Hankins as a Distinguished Graduate in 1993. Hankins subsequently earned her Master's of Science degree from the London School of Hygiene and Tropical Medicine and her PhD from the University of Amsterdam.

== Career ==
In 1983, Hankins was appointed Deputy Medical Officer of Health at Calgary Health Services as the country dealt with the AIDS epidemic. While serving in this role, she found meat linked to E. coli which caused kidney failure in three children and she sent 49 raw hamburger samples to a laboratory in Edmonton. Hankins was also appointed chairwoman of the National Task Force on HIV-AIDS and Injection Drug Use where she encouraged the use of safe injection sites and legalization of drugs. She urged the country to move quickly in response to the HIV/AIDS pandemic and said that if Ottawa doesn't respond to her group's call then "there will be the continuation of the HIV epidemic, and expansion of that epidemic into the heterosexual population who do not inject drugs." Hankins was soon called by the Quebec government to oversee a public health campaign on the importance of safe sex practices and condom use. However, days, before that campaign was set to launch, Thérèse Lavoie-Roux, caved to pressure from a Catholic lobby group and pulled the campaign.

By 2002, Hankins was recruited by the United Nations to serve as their Chief Scientific Adviser to UNAIDS in Geneva where she led the scientific knowledge translation team focusing on "ensuring ethical and participatory HIV prevention trial conduct, convening mathematical modelling teams, and supporting country implementation of proven biomedical HIV prevention modalities." A decade later, in 2012, the Amsterdam Institute for Global Health and Development appointed Hankins as Deputy Director of Science where she would "oversee a range of HIV prevention research, including intervention and demonstration projects, as well as scientific knowledge translation." The following year, she was elected a Member of the Order of Canada for "her contributions to combatting the spread of HIV/AIDS in Canada and abroad" and was hired to teach at McGill University.

During the COVID-19 pandemic in North America, Hankins was named to the leadership team of the national COVID-19 Immunity Task Force. In this role, she aimed to get an antibody test approved and standardized across the country and define how the virus was spread. In order to complete this objective, the Task Force funded a survey carried out by Statistics Canada to find out how many Canadians were infected by COVID by November.
