= Canadian AIDS Society =

Canadian charity

- Société canadienne du sida
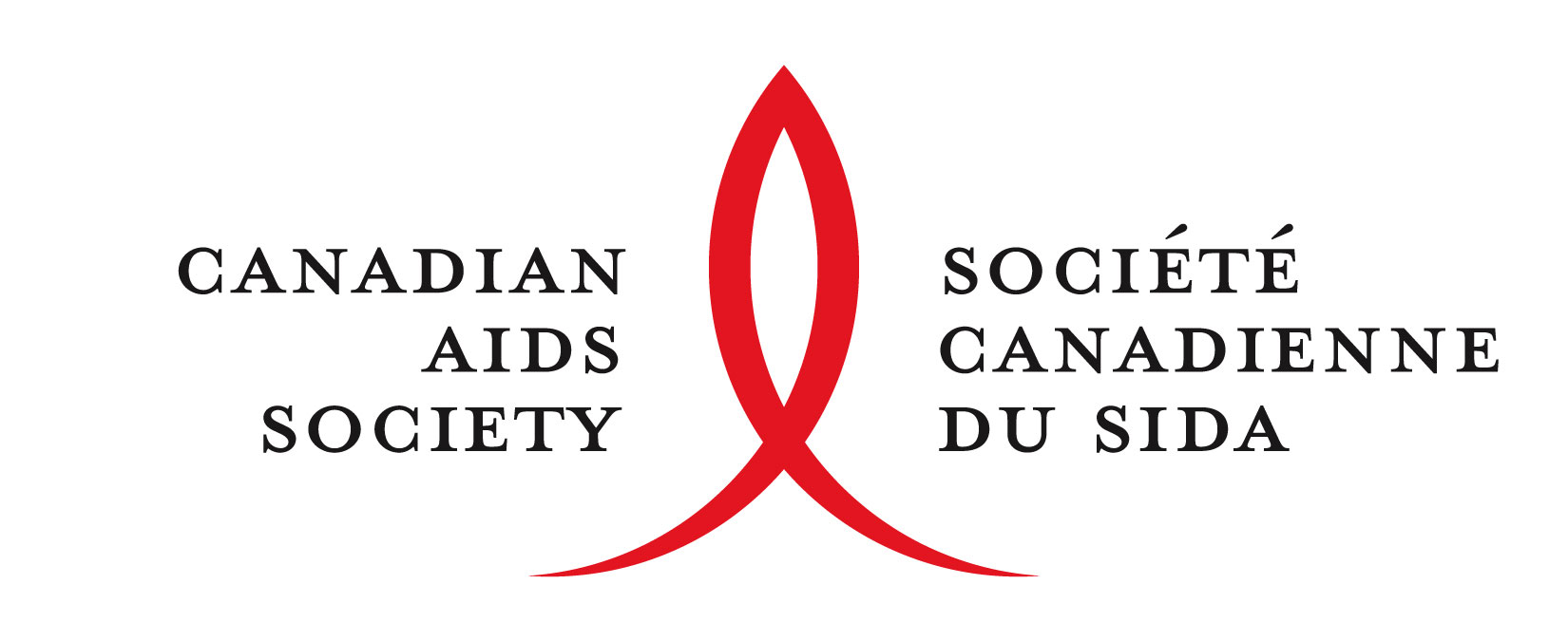
- Formation: May 12, 1987; 39 years ago
- Type: Charitable organization April 1, 1988
- Legal status: Active
- Purpose: Support and advocate for those affected by HIV/AIDS
- Headquarters: 355-1554 Carling Avenue; Ottawa, Ontario; K1Z 7M4
- Official languages: English; French
- Executive Director: Ken Miller
- Website: www.cdnaids.ca

The Canadian AIDS Society (CAS) is a national charitable organization dedicated to advocating for AIDS Service Organizations across Canada. Established in 1987 amidst the growing HIV/AIDS crisis and an inadequate governmental response, CAS initially began as a grassroots movement and later formalized into a coalition, incorporating in 1988. The decision to relocate to Ottawa was strategic, aiming to enhance engagement with governmental bodies.

Throughout its history, CAS has been involved in shaping national policies related to HIV/AIDS, including advocating for the development and renewal of the National AIDS Strategy (NAS) in Canada. CAS has also worked to secure funding for HIV/AIDS initiatives nationwide, facing challenges such as resistance from government officials.

CAS conducts community outreach and awareness campaigns, managing initiatives such as National HIV Testing Day, AIDS Walk Canada, and the stewardship of the Canadian AIDS Memorial Quilt. These programs aim to raise awareness and provide support to individuals affected by HIV/AIDS across the country.

In recent years, CAS has expanded its efforts to promote HIV testing and sexual health advocacy, emphasizing the importance of sustained access to testing resources, while continuing to address the needs of those impacted by HIV/AIDS within Canada's public health landscape.

== History ==
The Canadian AIDS Society (CAS) was established in response to the growing HIV/AIDS crisis in Canada during the 1980s. At that time, the Canadian government's response to the epidemic was largely inadequate, resulting in insufficient support and resources to address the challenges posed by HIV/AIDS. Faced with bureaucratic inactivity and the absence of a coordinated national strategy, local organizations, including AIDS Service Organizations (ASOs), recognized the need to unite their efforts. The formation of CAS stemmed from discussions and collaborations among representatives of these ASOs during national conferences on HIV/AIDS held in Montreal in 1985 and Toronto in 1986. These conferences played a crucial role in mobilizing efforts to combat the epidemic on a broader scale, leading to the establishment of CAS as a national umbrella organization.

In 1987, the CAS hosted its national conference in Ottawa, using the proximity to the nation's capital to engage with federal government agencies and to educate government officials about the needs of community-based AIDS organizations. across the country.

Initially operating as an informal network, CAS became a formalized coalition upon its incorporation in 1988. Led by Michael Phair, its first board chair from Edmonton, CAS relocated to Ottawa and obtained charity status, providing greater access to government channels and a more stable funding base. The membership of CAS grew from 16 to 27 organizations at the time of incorporation. With formalization, CAS could represent AIDS Service Organizations (ASOs) across the nation, advocating for their interests at the national level, which continuing to champion the concerns of local ASOs. The decentralized structure of CAS ensured that member organizations retained influence in the decision-making processes of the coalition. This emphasis on accountability to local organizations was imperative for CAS to uphold its credibility and effectiveness as a national advocacy entity.

Since 1988, the Canadian AIDS Society (CAS) has reserved a seat on its board of directors for a person living with HIV/AIDS (PHA). Following the establishment of the First Annual Forum for PHAs in 1992, CAS has addressed a broad spectrum of issues relevant to PHA, including treatment and research, income security, housing and hospice care, and health promotion strategies.

=== National AIDS Strategy ===
The Canadian AIDS Society (CAS) was involved in advocacy efforts related to the development and renewal of the National AIDS Strategy (NAS) in Canada. Despite initial challenges, such as resistance from Minister of Health Jake Epp, CAS initiated advocacy efforts for a National AIDS Strategy to address the escalating epidemic. Political momentum increased with the appointment of Perrin Beatty as Minister of Health in 1989, who committed to developing the NAS during the 5th International Conference on AIDS in Montreal. CAS established itself as a credible organization on Parliament Hill, gaining direct access to Minister Beatty and influencing policy discussions. Their efforts led to the release of the first phase of the NAS in 1990, with an annual budget of $37.3 million. CAS advocated for the renewal and expansion of the NAS through various means, including negotiations and policy development.

In 1993, Phase II of the NAS was launched, allocating $42.2 million annually over five years. CAS retained its position as a significant stakeholder in the negotiations for the National AIDS Strategy (NAS), ultimately securing the renewal of Phase III, which was renamed the Canadian Strategy on HIV/AIDS in 1998. This renewal was endorsed by Minister of Health Allan Rock and included ongoing government funding of $42.2 million annually. By then, CAS had grown to over 120 member organizations and expanded its staff to 22 employees, consolidating its position as a legitimate voice in Canadian politics and a vital advocate for AIDS Service Organizations (ASOs) nationwide.

== Structure ==
=== Member organizations ===
The Canadian AIDS Society (CAS) acts as a representative body for AIDS Service Organizations (ASOs) across Canada, spanning multiple provinces and cities. Eligibility for membership requires organizations to be community-based and volunteer-driven, with a primary focus on HIV/AIDS activities.

=== Evolution of governance and representation ===
The Canadian AIDS Society (CAS) is overseen by a board of directors, which includes two representatives from each region of Canada, one of whom is required to be HIV-positive. Additionally, CAS has two at-large board seats for one male and one female member, ensuring gender-diverse representation. One board seat is allocated for a young person living with HIV.

=== Funding ===
CAS has received funding from the federal government through the Public Health Agency of Canada. However, since the reorganization of funding priorities for HIV and Hepatitis C in 2016, CAS has not received any federal funding. This shift, alongside broader underfunding issues for HIV/AIDS service organizations in Canada, has provoked strong criticism from various stakeholders, including CAS's national partner, the HIV Legal Network.

== Programs and campaigns ==
=== AIDS memorial quilt ===
In 1989, the Persons With AIDS (PWA) Coalition in Halifax organized the Canadian Tour of the American Names Project AIDS Memorial Quilt across Canada as part of a larger North American Tour. Collaborating with local AIDS activists, they exhibited the quilt to coincide with local Pride Week activities, with each host city required to raise $10,000 to cover the costs of hosting the quilt.

The quilt journeyed through seven Canadian cities during the months of June and July:

- Halifax June 1 to 3 Saint Mary's University Tower
- Montreal June 8 to 11 Montréal Velodrome
- Ottawa June 15 to 18 Lansdowne Park Coliseum building
- Toronto June 22 to 24
- Winnipeg June 29 to July 1 University of Winnipeg Athletic Center
- Calgary July 4 to 6 Olympic Plaza
- Vancouver July 13 to 16 Vancouver Art Gallery

As the quilt traveled, local panels were created to remember those who died of AIDS. The Canada Quilt took shape during the US Quilt's tour, with new Canadian panels. Returned to Halifax in July, these panels formed the first sections of the Canadian AIDS Memorial Quilt. Although separate from the US Quilt, the Names Project in Canada follows identical procedures. In October 1989, the Halifax PWA Coalition exhibited the Canadian quilt at the final display of the entire US quilt on The Ellipse in Washington, D.C.

In 1992, the Canadian AIDS Society (CAS) cared for the Quilt until 1994. The Names Project Canada located in Halifax took over in June 1994, growing the quilt from 400 to over 640 panels. Originating as a response to the AIDS epidemic, the quilt commemorates lives and raises funds for AIDS service organizations.

=== National HIV testing day ===
On June 27, 2019, CAS hosted its second annual event in collaboration with local health workers and community organizations. Over 100 community organizations established HIV testing sites for Canada's annual National HIV Testing Day, which is held each year.

=== STBBI testing during the COVID-19 pandemic ===
In collaboration with the University of Ottawa and Ottawa Public Health, CAS partnered with local organizations such as the AIDS Committee of Ottawa (ACO) in piloting the GetaKit project, which facilitated the first testing of HIV self-testing home kits in Ottawa on April 23, 2020.

Approved by Health Canada on November 3, 2020, the first HIV self-testing home kits serve as a tool to reduce the number of undetected infections.
