= Susan Kirkland =

Canadian epidemiologist

- Born: 1956 (age 69–70); British Columbia, Canada

Academic background
- Education: BSc, MSc, 1987, University of Waterloo; PhD, 1996, University of Toronto
- Thesis: Postmenopausal hormone use and ischemic heart disease: a retrospective cohort study (1996)

Academic work
- Institutions: Dalhousie University

Susan Anne Kirkland (born 1956) is a Canadian epidemiologist. She is the associate director of the Geriatric Medicine Unit at Dalhousie University and one of three Principal Investigators on the Canadian Longitudinal Study on Aging.

== Early life and education ==
Kirkland was born in 1956 and raised in British Columbia. She earned her Bachelor of Science degree and Master's degree from the University of Waterloo before enrolling at the University of Toronto for her PhD.

== Career ==
Upon completing her PhD, Kirkland joined the faculty of Dalhousie University's Department of Community Health and Epidemiology in 1992. During her tenure at the school, Kirkland became one of three Principal Investigators on the Canadian Longitudinal Study on Aging to understand the process of ageing. She was also appointed the Director of the Atlantic Interdisciplinary Research Network and named a University Research Professor at Dalhousie.

During the COVID-19 pandemic in Canada, Kirkland was appointed to the national COVID-19 Immunity Task Force Leadership Group by Prime Minister Justin Trudeau. While serving in this role, the Canadian Longitudinal Study on Aging received funding to study how the SARS-CoV-2 affects the ageing population who are shown to be at greatest risk for severe outcomes from COVID-19 disease. She was also recognized by the AGE-WELL network with their Fellow Award for her "long-term, substantial contributions to research and innovation in technology and aging, and to the AGE-WELL network."
