= Jennifer Gardy =

Canadian biochemist

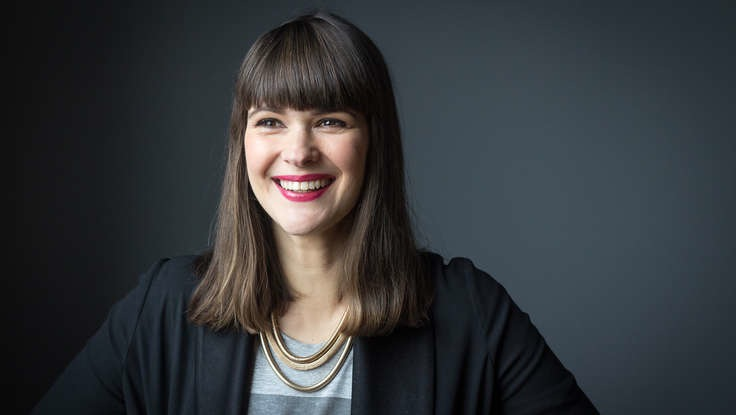
- Dr. Jennifer Gardy
- Born: July 3, 1979 (age 47); Vancouver, British Columbia, Canada
- Education: University of British Columbia, Simon Fraser University, McGill University
- Known for: Epidemiology, Genomics, Bioinformatics
- Awards: National Academy of Medicine, 2021
- Scientific career
- Fields: Molecular Biology, Biochemistry, Bioinformatics
- Workplaces: BC Centre for Disease Control; University of British Columbia, Bill & Melinda Gates Foundation
- Doctoral advisor: Fiona Brinkman

Jennifer Gardy is a Canadian scientist, educator and broadcaster, with expertise in the fields of molecular biology, biochemistry, and bioinformatics. Since February 2019 she has been the Deputy Director, Surveillance, Data, and Epidemiology on the Global Health: Malaria team at the Bill & Melinda Gates Foundation. She was previously an associate professor at the University of British Columbia's School of Population and Public Health, a Canada Research Chair in Public Health Genomics, and a Senior Scientist at the BC Centre for Disease Control. She is an occasional host of CBC's The Nature of Things, a science communicator, and a children's book author. She was elected to the National Academy of Medicine in 2021 as an International Member.

== Education ==
Gardy received her PhD in molecular biology and biochemistry from Simon Fraser University in 2006. Previously, she earned a BSc in Cell Biology and Genetics from the University of British Columbia (2000) and a Graduate Certificate in Biotechnology from McGill University in 2001.

== BC Centre for Disease Control ==
Dr. Gardy began working for the BC Centre for Disease Control (BCCDC) in 2009. During Dr. Gardy's time at the BCCDC, her team published the first paper to use next-generation DNA sequencing to reconstruct person-to-person disease transmission events in a large outbreak of tuberculosis. This and subsequent work from her team helped to establish the new field of pathogen genomic epidemiology. In 2014, she was made the Canada Research Chair (Tier 2) in Public Health Genomics.

== Bill & Melinda Gates Foundation ==
In her current role at the Gates Foundation, Dr. Gardy oversees strategy and investment activities for the Malaria Surveillance, Data, and Epidemiology portfolio, which focuses on empowering National Malaria Control Programs to use better-quality data and advanced analytics for malaria strategic planning, decision-making, and policy-setting. Her portfolio includes work related to strengthening routine surveillance systems for malaria, improving data use within malaria programs, malaria genetic and genomic surveillance, and geospatial and mathematical modeling to understand malaria epidemiology.

== Media ==
Jennifer Gardy has appeared on Discovery Channel Canada's Daily Planet. Jennifer Gardy has made regular appearances on CBC's documentary series The Nature of Things and hosted these episodes:

- Bugs, Bones & Botany: The Science of Crime
- Myth or Science
- Myth or Science 2: The Quest for Perfection
- Dreams of the Future
- Myth or Science 3: You Are What You Eat
- Myth or Science 4: In the Eye of the Storm
- While You Were Sleeping (The Science of Sleep)
- Myth or Science: The Secrets of Our Senses
- Myth or Science: The Power of Poo

== Selected publications ==
- Gardy JL, Johnston JC, Shannon JHS et al. 2011. Whole genome sequencing and social-network analysis of a tuberculosis outbreak. N Engl J Med 364:730-739.
- Lynn, DJ, Gardy JL, Hancock REW, Brinkman FSL. 2010. Systems-Level Analyses of the Mammalian Innate Immune Response. Book chapter in Systems Biology for Signaling Networks, Springer Publishing, NY.
- Gardy JL, Lynn, DJ, Brinkman FSL, Hancock REW. 2009. Systems biology of the innate immune response: emerging approaches and resources. Trends in Immunology 30:249-262.
- Vivona S, Gardy JL, Ramachandran S, Brinkman FSL, Raghava GPS, Flower DR, Filippini F. Computer-aided biotechnology: from immunoinformatics to reverse vaccinology. Trends in Biotechnology. 26:190-200.
- Brown KL, Cosseau C, Gardy JL, Hancock REW. 2007. Complexities of targeting innate immunity to treat infection. Trends in Immunology. 28:260-6.
