= Robert C. Brunham =

Canadian infectious disease specialist

- Born: Creston, British Columbia, Canada

Academic background
- Education: BSc, MD, 1972, University of British Columbia

Academic work
- Institutions: University of British Columbia; British Columbia Centre for Disease Control; University of Manitoba

Robert Conrad Brunham FRSC OBC is a Canadian infectious disease specialist. He is the former Director of the UBC Centre for Disease Control and executive director and Scientific Director of the British Columbia Centre for Disease Control.

== Early life and education ==
Brunham was born and raised in Creston, British Columbia, Canada where he completed his undergraduate and medical degree at the University of British Columbia (UBC). Following this, he trained under King Holmes at the University of Washington before becoming a physician scientist at the University of Manitoba.

== Career ==
While working at the University of Manitoba, Brunham led their adult infectious disease program and became their Chair of Microbiology in 1987. In these roles, he focused his laboratory on addressing basic issues in chlamydial pathogenesis and host response. During the HIV/AIDS pandemic in the 1980s, Brunham led efforts to treat Manitobans suffering from the disease. He also was one of the first researchers to report on the sexually transmitted disease chlamydia. As a result of this discovery, he established a chlamydia laboratory and focused on becoming an independent chlamydial biologist. As a result of his research and academic success, Brunham was elected a Member of the American Society for Clinical Investigation in 1991.

Brunham returned to his home province in 1999 to become the Academic Director of the British Columbia Centre for Disease Control (BCCDC). At the BCCDC, he used the provincial databases to track the impact of Chlamydia control efforts on transmission dynamics and chronic infection sequelae, such as pelvic inflammatory disease, ectopic pregnancy, and infertility. Brunham also led British Columbia's tactical and strategic response during the 2002–2004 SARS outbreak which included the testing and developing of a SARS vaccine. In recognition of his co-leadership in the SARS Accelerated Vaccine Initiative, Brunham was also the co-recipient of the 2005 Canadian Institutes of Health Research Partnership Award.

Following the SARS outbreak, Brunham was amongst the first adopters of genomics technologies in public health which he demonstrated during a local tuberculosis outbreak. He also led an effort to sequence several hundred pandemic H1N1 genomes to explore viral evolutionary dynamics in the context of a pandemic at the 2010 Winter Olympics. As a result of his efforts, Brunham was elected a Member of the Order of British Columbia. Brunham stepped down from his role as Executive and Scientific Director of the BCCDC in 2014 to oversee the Vaccine Research Laboratory at the UBC Centre for Disease Control. Upon leaving his position, Brunham was awarded the Dr. Don Rix Award for Lifetime Achievement for his contributions during the HIV/AIDS and SARS pandemics. The following year, he was also named a fellow of the Royal Society of Canada.

During the COVID-19 pandemic, Brunham was appointed to sit on the Government of Canada's COVID-19 Vaccine Task Force to ensure the purchase, distribution and delivery of a safe and effective vaccine. He also collaborated with Natalie Strynadka on a project aimed at predicting changes to SARS-CoV-2.
