= Caroline Quach-Thanh =

Canadian pediatric microbiologist, epidemiologist and infectious diseases specialist

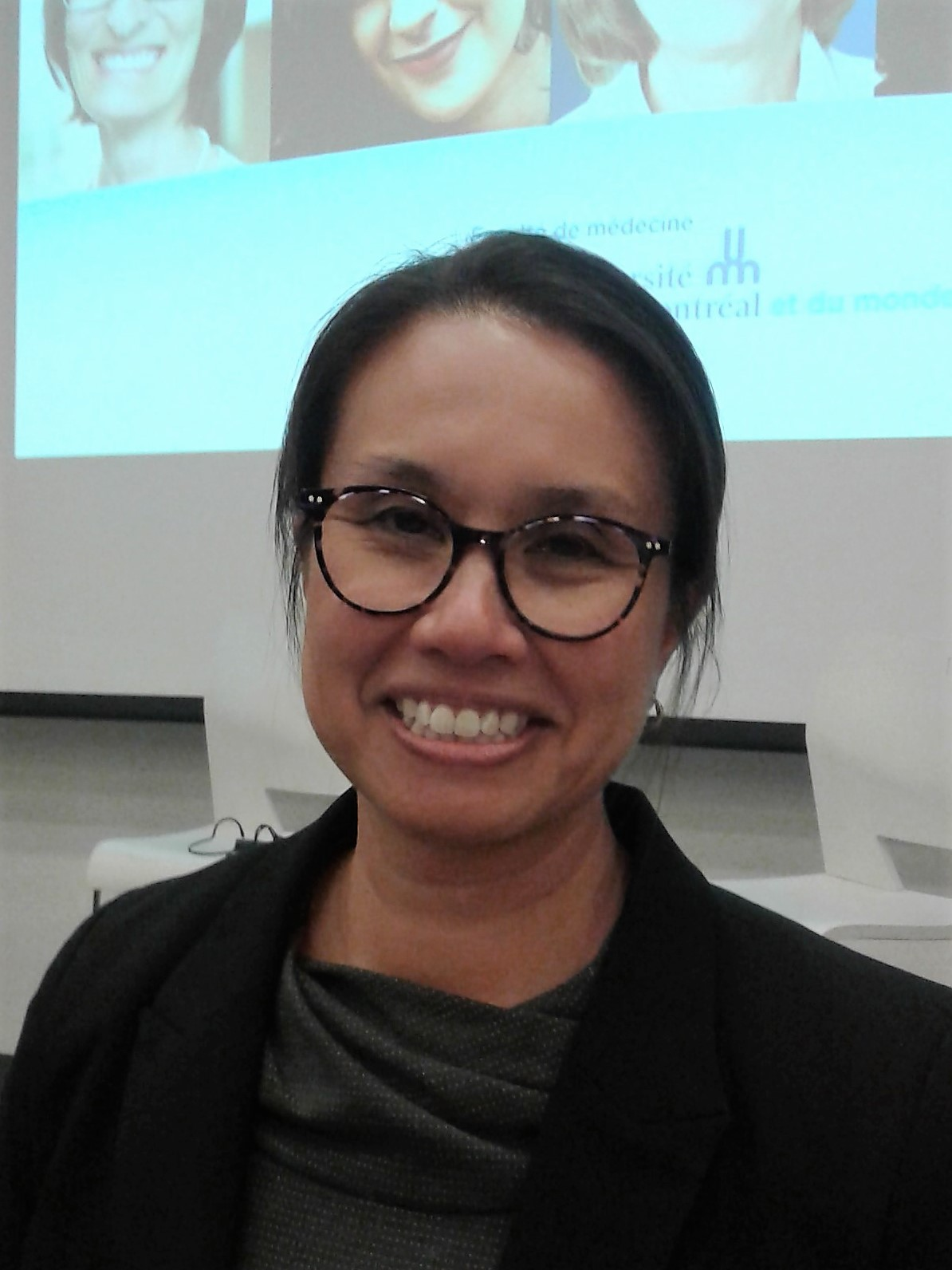
- Born: March 15, 1972 (age 54)
- Occupation: Researcher

Caroline Quach-Thanh CM OQ (born March 15, 1972) is a Canadian pediatric microbiologist, epidemiologist and infectious diseases specialist. She is a professor in the Université de Montréal Faculty of Medicine and Medical Lead in the Infection Prevention and Control Unit at CHU Sainte-Justine. She served as the Chair of the National Advisory Committee on Immunization (NACI) before and during the COVID-19 pandemic, and oversaw the development of usage guidelines for COVID-19 vaccines in Canada.

== Background ==
Born March 15, 1972, Caroline Quach-Thanh completed medical school in 1995, and a residency in pediatrics in 1998 at the University of Montréal. She then pursued her post-doctoral studies in pediatric infections and microbiology (2002), the a Master's degree in Epidemiology (2003) at McGill University. She is a Merit Seeker Research Chair under Fonds de recherche du Québec - Santé.

== Career ==
Quach-Thanh served as Chair of the Association of Medical Microbiology and Infectious Disease (AMMI) Canada from 2014-2016. She served as Chair of the National Advisory Committee on Immunization (NACI) from 2018 to 2021, having first served as a member and then Vice-Chair since 2017, as well as the Québec Immunization Committee at l'Institut national de santé publique du Québec. In this role, she has spoken publicly against “vaccine disinformation” and has described vaccination as a collective responsibility. She was a member of the Advisory Committee on Immunization Practices (ACIP), serving as a liaison representative on behalf of NACI.

She is also a member of the INSPQ’s Québec Immunization Committee, including having served as Chair from March 2015 to June 2019.

Quach-Thanh co-delivered a presentation alongside NACI executive secretary Matthew Tunis at the 2018 Canadian Immunization Conference titled "What's new at NACI?" discussing the expansion of NACI's roles and responsibilities.

Quach-Thanh has donated at least $50,000 to the Sainte Justine Children's Hospital Foundation.

She previously served as Medical Director of the McGill University Health Centre (MUHC) Vaccine Study Centre, a clinical research program that had (at the time) ran “over 75” studies in vaccines and epidemiology.

=== COVID-19 ===
In response to criticism and confusion following NACI’s recommendations (such as its changing guidance on the AstraZeneca product), she admitted that the council’s members were exhausted from the totality of their workload.

The Collège des médecins du Québec applauded Dr. Quach-Thanh for her contributions to Québec's health care system and for her work for the public during the COVID-19 pandemic. Quach’s colleague at the University of Montreal, Daniel Jutras, praised her for the “some 700 interviews” she delivered during the course of the COVID-19 pandemic.

Quach-Thanh is a member of the COVID-19 Immunity Task Force, serving as Chair of the Vaccine Surveillance Reference Group. After concluding her role at NACI, she participated in a study for the task force evaluating effects of COVID-19 vaccines in children. The Government of Canada provided approximately $1.8 million in funding for the study.

On October 18, 2021, Quach-Thanh was quoted in a press release stating that PCR testing should be used in a school setting for asymptomatic students due to their relative sensitivity, whereas rapid antigen tests should be reserved for children displaying symptoms.

== Research ==
Quach-Thanh's research interests surround infection prevention, particularly hospital-acquired infections and vaccine-preventable diseases. She has published over 100 scientific articles in the PubMed database.

She has contributed to around fifteen epidemiological reports from the Institut national de santé publique du Québec. She has also written several chapters in books on pediatric infections, as well as pharmacology.

Her expertise is regularly called on to share important information on new outbreaks of pathogens, and vaccination.

=== Influenza ===
In 2020, she received a $2.1 million grant from the Canadian Institutes of Health Research to study the risk of reinfection from SARS-CoV-2, the virus that causes COVID-19, among health care workers.

Quach-Thanh was awarded the Canada Research Chair in Infection Prevention and Control on November 1, 2020. The focus of her project, “from Hospital to Community”, is minimizing healthcare-associated infections as well as evaluating the risks and benefits of vaccine regimens. She was awarded $1,400,000 for the period of November 1, 2020 - October 31, 2027 from the Social Sciences and Humanities Research Council under the Canada Research Chairs Program.

== Accolades ==
In 2014, Quach-Thanh received an award for excellence in research from the Montreal Children's Hospital Foundation, under sponsorship by Pfizer. In 2016, she was awarded the John Embil Mentorship Award in Infectious Diseases by the Canadian Foundation for Infectious Diseases.

She was recognized in 2019 and 2020 among Canada's Most Powerful Women: Top 100, in the Manulife-sponsored category of science and technology.

In 2026, she was named as an Member of the Order of Canada.
