= HIV/AIDS in Canada =

HIV/AIDS was first detected in Canada in 1982. In 2018, there were approximately 62,050 people living with HIV/AIDS in Canada. It was estimated that 8,300 people were living with undiagnosed HIV in 2018. Mortality has decreased due to medical advances against HIV/AIDS, especially highly active antiretroviral therapy (HAART).

== History ==
1981: Doctors in the U.S. begin reporting abnormally high rates of rare forms of pneumonia and cancer in young, gay men. At first, the disease is called Gay-Related Immune Deficiency (GRID). By the end of the year, similar diseases are reported in injection drug users.

1982: The disease is renamed Acquired Immune Deficiency Syndrome (AIDS) and it is realized that the infection can be sexually transmitted. Cases are reported in hemophiliacs and blood transfusion recipients. The first cases of AIDS are reported in Africa and Canada reports its first case of AIDS in March of this year.

1983: It was discovered that women can become infected with AIDS through heterosexual sex meanwhile the World Health Organization (WHO) begins global surveillance of AIDS. Cases of AIDS are reported in multiple countries worldwide. Canada forms a national task force on AIDS. Le Comité sida aide Montréal (CSAM) is formed from a working group called ARMS that is funded by the Quebec Government with a triple mandate of prevention, advocacy, and care.

1984: The AIDS Committee of Toronto (ACT) initiates the first AIDS Awareness Week.

1985: The Canadian Red Cross begins testing all blood products for HIV and the first Canadian Conference on AIDS is held in Montreal.

1986: The first commercial blood test for HIV is licensed by the US Food and Drug Administration (FDA). It is discovered that HIV can be passed from mother to child through breastfeeding. The Canadian AIDS Society (CAS) is established and the first Canadian AIDS Research Conference is held in Toronto. According to Gary Kinsman, the first AIDS activist action in Canada was held in front of the British Columbia Legislature in Victoria. The march was organized by what would go on to become the Vancouver Persons With AIDS Coalition. The march was a demand for a Class D antiviral lab test and funding for AZT (azidothymidine) treatment.

1987: Vancouver activist Kevin Brown, a founder of the Positive Living Society of British Columbia, lobbies the federal government for access to the anti-retroviral drug, AZT. Clinique L’Actuel, specializing in HIV care, is established in Montreal. The WHO develops the first global strategy on AIDS and AIDS becomes the first disease ever to be debated at the UN General Assembly. Bill 34 is introduced in the parliament of British Columbia, which granted the government the power to quarantine individuals affected with HIV/AIDS and isolate them in a region. This incited mixed reactions, including a huge uproar from local HIV/AIDS activists.

1989: The lack of a coordinated government response prompted numerous Canadians, along with members of ACT UP NYC, to participate in the highly publicized demonstrations at the Fifth International AIDS Conference in Montreal in June. Tim McCaskell took the stage with other activists during the opening ceremony where he stated: "On behalf of people with AIDS from Canada and around the world, I would like to officially open this Fifth International Conference on AIDS!" During the conference, Perrin Beatty, the newly appointed federal Minister of Health and Welfare, acknowledged the absence of a national AIDS plan in Canada.

1997: Two-Spirit activist Albert McLeod co-founds the Canadian Aboriginal AIDS Network (CAAN). Since its creation CAAN has performed advocacy, engaged in research, and provided community based services with the goal of helping Canadian Indigenous people with HIV/AIDS.

1998: There is an explosive outbreak of HIV among injection users in Vancouver. The city becomes known as the place with the highest percentage of people living with HIV in the developed world. Doctors start to notice the first drug-resistant strains of HIV. The Canadian Working Group on HIV and Rehabilitation is established.

1999: The WHO announces that HIV/AIDS has become the fourth largest killer worldwide and the first Canadian Conference on AIDS is held in Montreal. It is discovered that a single dose of nevirapine is effective in reducing mother-to-child transmission during pregnancy.

2000: The United Nations Secretary-General creates the Global Fund to Fight HIV/AIDS, Tuberculosis, and Malaria.

2001: The National Aboriginal Council on HIV/AIDS is established to identify and address shared Indigenous community and Public Health Agency of Canada priorities and provide advice informed by community knowledge, lived experience and relevant practice specific to the needs of Indigenous peoples.

2002: AIDS becomes the leading cause of death worldwide in people aged 15–59 years.

2003: The WHO announces the “3 by 5” Initiative to bring treatment to 3 million people worldwide by 2005. The first officially sanctioned supervised injection site in North America opens in Vancouver's Downtown Eastside.

2004: UNAIDS launches the Global Coalition on Women and AIDS to raise the visibility of the impact of HIV/AIDS on women and girls worldwide. The WHO supports the provision of sterile injection equipment to reduce HIV transmission.

2005: Health Canada approves a rapid HIV antibody test for sale to health professionals in Canada, which enables point-of-care (POC) testing that can provide an accurate HIV antibody test result in two minutes.

2006: The UN convenes a follow-up meeting and issues a progress report on the implementation of the Declaration of Commitment on HIV/AIDS. The 16th International AIDS Conference is held in Toronto.

2007: The WHO and UNAIDS recommend that “male circumcision should always be considered as part of a comprehensive HIV prevention package.” The Canadian HIV Vaccine Initiative (CHVI) is established as Canada's contribution to global efforts to develop a safe and effective vaccine.

2008: The 20th anniversary of World AIDS day. With funding from the Public Health Agency of Canada (PHAC), the Canadian AIDS Treatment Information Exchange (CATIE) extends its mandate to become the national Knowledge Exchange Broker of information for the prevention, treatment, care, and support for people living with and vulnerable to HIV/AIDS.

2009: UNAIDS calls for the implementation of programs to work toward the virtual elimination of mother-to-child transmission of HIV by 2015.

2010: The Vienna Declaration, a statement seeking to improve community health and safety by calling for the incorporation of scientific evidence into illicit drug policies, is launched at the 18th International AIDS Conference in Vienna, Austria.

2011: For the first time, WHO includes transgender people as a group at increased risk for HIV infection in their guidelines. The Supreme Court of Canada rules that InSite, Vancouver's supervised injection site, can continue to operate without the continual threat of legal interference.

2012: New Canadian HIV guidelines for planning pregnancy are published to help health care practitioners advise HIV-positive people about issues related to fertility and pregnancy. Despite growing scientific evidence that HIV treatment dramatically reduces the risk of transmission when the viral load is undetectable, the Supreme Court of Canada rules that an HIV positive person has a legal duty to disclose his or her HIV status to a sexual partner before having sex that poses a “realistic possibility” of HIV transmission. According to the ruling, a person living with HIV does not have to disclose his or her HIV status to a sexual partner before having vaginal sex if a condom is used and the HIV-positive person has a low viral load. The Canadian Institutes for Health Research (CIHR) announces funding to support the Aboriginal HIV and AIDS Community-Based Research Collaborative Centre and the REACH CBR Collaborative Centre in HIV/AIDS.

2013: The Quebec Ministry of Health publishes the first Canadian interim guidance on pre-exposure prophylaxis (PrEP). The Working Group on Best Practice for Harm Reduction Programs in Canada releases updated and comprehensive best practice recommendations for Canadian harm reduction programs.

2014: Canadian medical experts release important expert consensus statement on HIV and the criminal law. British Columbia releases new HIV testing guidelines for all adults, which recommends that providers routinely offer HIV testing to all patients. The Quebec Ministry of Health adopts a consensus statement on viral load and HIV transmission risk developed to inform the delivery of risk-reduction counseling.

2015: The Canadian Positive People Network (CPPN), a new independent network for and by people living with HIV and HIV co-infections, is formed to represent the needs of all persons and communities affected by HIV and HIV co-infections. Canada endorses the UNAIDS 90-90-90 global HIV treatment targets.

2016: Health Canada approves the use of daily oral Truvada for use as PrEP to reduce the risk of sexual transmission of HIV. The Association of Medical Microbiology and Infectious Disease Canada (AMMI) releases a position statement recommending that ART be initiated in adults as soon as HIV is diagnosed regardless of immune cell (CD4 T Cell) count. Nearly 250 Canadian organizations sign a statement calling for the implementation of prison-based needle/syringe programs.

2017: CATIE joins other national and international organizations in signing on the Prevention Access Campaign's Undetectable=Untransmittable (U=U) campaign.

2018: PHAC releases “Reducing the health impact of sexually transmitted and blood borne infections in Canada by 2030: A pan-Canadian STBBI framework for action”, which provides a roadmap for collaborative and complementary actions to reduce the impact of STBBIs in Canada and supports and contributes the achievement of global STBBI targets.

2019: The Sex Information and Education Council of Canada releases updated Canadian Guidelines for sexual health education. The Government of Canada releases “Accelerating our response: Government of Canada five-year action plan on sexually transmitted and blood-borne infections,” which outlines the government's priorities for the action plan released in 2018.

== Quarantine Legislation and intervention ==
=== Bill 34 ===
One way the Canadian government responded to the HIV/AIDS crisis was through quarantine legislation. A prominent example of this occurred in British Columbia when Bill 34, otherwise classified as the Quarantine Bill, was presented by Premier Bill Vander Zalm of the British Columbia Social Credit Party. The Bill allowed the government to force individuals affected with HIV/AIDS to quarantine in a designated area. Isolation was to be regulated by 2 levels: isolation and modified isolation, overseen by the Solicitor General of Vancouver. The intentions of the Bill were highly controversial both before and after it was introduced in 1987. Organizations such as AIDS Coalition to Unleash Power (ACTUP), the Coalition for Responsible Health Legislation (CRHL) and Persons With AIDS Society (PWAS) believed the Bill should be abolished. The Bill was eventually passed, but was never enforced due to the lobbying of the aforementioned activists, particularly the CRHL. The Coalition for Responsible Health Legislation argued that individuals should have personal responsibility and autonomy for themselves and their partners. Many of these organizations advocated for an anti-testing component, because the only treatment available at the time was azidothymidine (AZT). Testing for the medication was not used preventatively but rather to identify, quarantine, and discriminate against those living with AIDS.

=== Section 22 ===
Section 22 of the Health Protection and Promotion Act states that a medical officer “...may require a person to take or to refrain from taking any action that is specified in the order in respect of a communicable disease.” This caused fear, as the threat was that the Medical Officer could remand someone who is deemed to be putting other people at risk, namely HIV-positive patients. Ian Gemmill, the Associate Medical Officer of Health in Ottawa, was responsible for all of the Section 22 orders in the city. Ottawa had a disproportionately large representation of Section 22s, with thirty-seven orders in the city compared to the four from the rest of Ontario. This was criticized, namely by the Ontario AIDS Network, who complained to the Ministry of Health during the fight for anonymous testing. One point of criticism was that people would avoid testing for HIV, as the result of testing positive would entail the Medical Officer using Section 22 to trace contacts and criminalize patients who acted “unsafe”, which Gemmill would extend to any form of sexual contact.

== Prevalence across Canada ==
According to the 2016 national HIV estimates, there were approximately 63,110 Canadians with HIV by the end of 2016 which represents a 5% increase since 2014. The increase in deaths can be explained as new HIV infections are isolated and fewer deaths among those infected due to better treatment options. A federal study found that among the 63,110 individuals in Canada living with HIV, nearly half (49.1%) were gay, bisexual and other men who have sex with men and 14.6% were among people who inject drugs. This study also looked at heterosexual contact among those born in Canada or in a country no on the HIV-endemic list and found that this group represented 17.6% of the population. They also found that heterosexual contact among people born in a country where HIV is endemic was 15% of the total population of individuals affected.

The study by the Federal Government found that approximately 9.6% of individuals affected in Canada were Indigenous. This represents a 5% increase from the 2014 estimate. The HIV prevalence rate for Indigenous peoples in Canada estimated for 2016 is two times higher (362 per 100,000) than the general population. In this study, both the general population and the Indigenous population that has been isolated both saw a 5% increase in HIV rates from 2014 to 2016. As well, there are many external factors that have contributed to the increased prevalence described. Culture, poverty, and self-determination are key health determinants for Indigenous populations. To understand the competing paradigms between western medicine and Indigenous tradition, researchers have included traditional Indigenous approaches in addressing health concerns.

This infection is distributed across geographic regions unequally and has affected provinces with varying severity. The two provinces with the largest proportion of new infections in 2017 were Ontario (38.9% of the overall total) and Quebec (27.9% of the overall total). As well, Quebec and Saskatchewan have the highest rates out of any province with 8.0 new infections per 100,000 and 15.5 new infections per 100,000 respectively.

The distribution of new infections across Canada disproportionately affects certain populations within the country such as gay, bisexual, and other men who have sex with men, Indigenous people, and people from countries where HIV is endemic. Another factor to consider when discussing HIV/AIDS prevalence across the country is the use of injection drugs (exposure) as they have resulted in increased prevalence of HIV in users. When discussing the prevalence of HIV/AIDS in Canada, it is important to take into account these factors and the role that they play in supporting individuals affected.

== Prevention and support ==
In 2019, the Government of Canada invested $22.85 million in HIV/AIDS research through the Canadian Institutes for Health Research. This money went towards supporting a community of researchers, people living with HIV and their caregivers, health advocates, pharmaceutical and biotechnology companies to generate knowledge about prevention, treatment, management, and a cure for HIV/AIDS and other sexually transmitted and blood-borne infections.

Many organizations have been instituted by Indigenous peoples to combat the elevated rates of HIV/AIDS in Indigenous communities. This is seen from the Canadian Aboriginal AIDS Network and similar organizations run by Indigenous peoples. Acknowledging the unique risk factors that Indigenous people face is important but the unequal access to care is also a crucial determinant in their susceptibility to health problems.

The idea that AIDS had begun in Africa, and specifically affected Haitians as well as Black people, was growing and spreading. This resulted in the blame of the spreading AIDS being placed on Black communities and overrepresentation of Black queer and Black communities being displayed as diseased people. The triple H was used to refer to those who were affected by AIDS, including homosexuals, Haitians, and hemophiliacs. There were no services for people of colour and Indigenous people. This in turn resulted in the formation of organizations such as Black CAP. Though this organization was receiving a little bit of funding, it was not equal to what other groups were receiving, clearly demonstrating the racism occurring at the time. The collaboration of Black led and focused organizations, including but not limited to COMBAT, Black CAP, and BWC, began doing work around AIDS/HIV. Some work that Black CAP did was to hand out condoms and discuss AIDS and AIDS prevention, but also provide counselling. These community outreaches were essential in giving black people living with HIV/AIDS a safe space to discuss their experience and break the barriers in their society that they were facing.

== HIV/AIDS service organizations ==
- AIDS Committee of Toronto (ACT) is a well established AIDS service organization, primarily recognized for their work in the 1990s. Despite the organization's significant work for the AIDS community, it was dominated by white gay men with the notion that they needed to hold their ownership over AIDS. As a result, most work was targeted towards helping HIV-positive gay men rather than all HIV-positive individuals. This was problematic for many as the organization had control over education and funding during the AIDS epidemic but was sending away many women with the claim that they were not contracting AIDS/HIV. Indigenous people seeking service from ACT would face the same rejection, despite there being a lack of services for Indigenous people. AIDS activist Nicole Tanguay has spoken out about feeling as though there was a wall blocking out HIV-positive women. Tanguay holds the government responsible for not educating people about HIV-positive women and the divide between ACT and other HIV/AIDS organizations such as Black CAP, South Asian AIDS Network, and the Two Spirits.
- AIDS Network
- Alliance for South Asian AIDS Prevention (ASAAP)
- AVI Health & Community Services
- Black Coalition for AIDS Prevention (Black CAP) originally started as a program under ACT. However, as the organization grew, and due to many holding the belief that AIDS had originated from Africa, much of their work was questioned and always second guessed. Some believe that Black CAP intervention put HIV/AIDS on the map in terms of bringing up conversation within the Black community. Their work had to be quite discreet so that those visiting were not at risk of outing themselves as HIV-positive.
- Canadian AIDS Society (CAS)
- Canadian AIDS Treatment Information Exchange (CATIE)
- Gay Men's Sexual Health Alliance
- Health Initiative for Men (HIM)
- Max Ottawa
- Zami was an organization for Black and West Indian gays and lesbians in Toronto. Over the years, Zami had many different initiatives. It was initially a support group for individuals who felt disconnected from Pride and the LGBT community and thus seeking a place to connect with others. Zami had opportunities to be involved in a variety of initiatives and events, notably the Simon Nkoli Anti-Apartheid Committee and eventually this led them towards HIV/AIDS work.

== Significant research ==
The PrEP Implementation Project (PRIMP) is a multicomponent study which began in 2020 investigating strategies for increasing PrEP uptake among urban gay, bisexual men in Ontario and British Columbia.

== See also ==
- Canadian Foundation for AIDS Research
- HIV/AIDS in North America
- HIV/AIDS prophylaxis in British Columbia
