= Ron Paley =

Canadian composer

Ronald "Ron" Frank Paley OM (born November 20, 1950) is a Canadian composer, arranger, pianist, electric bassist, and big-band leader based in Winnipeg.

== Formation ==
Paley earned his B.Mus. at the University of Manitoba in 1972, studying piano under William Aide; he also studied under Ray Santisi at Berklee College of Music (1972–73), and privately in New York under Richie Beirach (piano), Bob Brookmeyer (composition, 1989–90), and others. Paley toured internationally from 1973 to 1975 as the electric bassist in turn with the Buddy Rich big band, and the Woody Herman big band. He recorded three albums with the latter band, including an album ("The Main Event") with Frank Sinatra.

== Musician, director, and band leader ==
Upon his return to Winnipeg, Paley rose to prominence on the local music scene as a composer, arranger, and leader of both big bands and small ensembles. He is a perennial act at the Jazz Winnipeg festival (either with the Ron Paley Big Band, or in small ensembles), has performed in concert with the Winnipeg Symphony Orchestra & the Royal Winnipeg Ballet, and has performed a concert of new music sponsored by Winnipeg's new music concert organization "Groundswell". In 2014, Ron Paley was presented with the BreakOut West "Heritage Award"—an honor bestowed upon an artist with "a demonstrated, outstanding body of work over a long period of time -- a real icon in the community".

The Ron Paley Big Band was formed in 1976, and has since performed numerous jazz concerts and dances, appeared at Expo 86 as part of a western Canadian tour, and traveled widely in Manitoba. The small ensemble performed at the 1987 Montreal International Jazz Festival.

Paley was also the musical director for the University of Manitoba stage band from 1976 to 1986, and filled the same role for two local TV shows, CKND's 'Friday Night Live' (1987), and CBC's 'Jerry and Ziz' (1979).

== Composer and arranger ==
His composition credits include two works for big band with symphony orchestra (We've Got It, 1979; Sound Cells, 1987), and two works for jazz trio with symphony orchestra (Rhythm Changes, 1978; Rhythm and Blues, 1987). These four works were premiered by Paley with the Winnipeg Symphony Orchestra. He also has written more that 25 pieces for big band alone (including the extended Interior Alternatives, 1989), as well as several third-stream items, notably Happiness Is a String Quartet Playing the Blues (1977), Saxophone Quintet (1981), and Shades of Jazz (1981). A number of his works were premiered at concerts sponsored by the Manitoba Composers Association, of which Paley is a member.

Paley was commissioned by the Royal Canadian College of Organists in 2002 to compose a work for choir and organ based upon the text of Psalm 122. He was thereafter commissioned by the National Arts Centre to write a fanfare for the Toronto Symphony Orchestra for the occasion of the Royal Visit. In 2004, his big band toured with the Royal Winnipeg Ballet, performing jazz arrangements of Rodgers and Hart tunes for "A Cinderella Story". Paley received a 2007 commission from the Winnipeg Singers for a choral work based on the text of three Shakespearean sonnets.

Paley was appointed as a member of the Order of Manitoba in 2024.

== Influence ==
Winnipeg Free Press jazz writer Chris Smith notes that "any number of longtime local musicians have performed in Paley's orchestra over the years, and many still do. It is considered both a good gig and training ground". Numerous well-established players include the Ron Paley Big Band in their pedigree, or cite Paley as an influence:

- Earl MacDonald – Juno-nominee, arranger, composer, jazz pianist, Director of Jazz Studies at the University of Connecticut
- Dr. Richard Gillis – trumpeter, recording artist, University of Manitoba Faculty of Music professor
- Ken Gold – saxophonist, recording artist, director of Small Jazz Ensembles at the University of Manitoba Faculty of Music
- Will Bonness – Winnipeg-based jazz pianist, composer, music educator
- Andrew Littleford – Winnipeg-based trumpeter, recording artist, music educator

== Discography ==
- Boxton (1977, Neptune NRP-1/London DL-3016)
- Ron Paley Big Band Jazz Rocks & Swings (1986, Foresight RP-2/Black-Hawk BKH-534)
- The Big Band Dance Album (1987, CKWG/87)
- The Sea of Time (1998, Foresight Records)
- Bring 'Em Back (2011, Paron)
- The More You Know (2018, Big Round Records BR 8951)
