= Teresa Liu-Ambrose =

Canadian physical therapist

Academic background
- Education: BSc, 1994, MA, 1998, PhD, 2004, University of British Columbia
- Thesis: Studies of fall risk and bone morphology in older women with low bone mass (2004)

Academic work
- Institutions: University of British Columbia

Teresa Yeong Lih Liu-Ambrose is a Canadian physical therapist. She is a Canada Research Chair of Physical Activity, Mobility, and Cognitive Neuroscience at the University of British Columbia.

== Early life and education ==
Liu-Ambrose completed her Bachelor of Science degree in physical therapy in 1994 at the University of British Columbia and remained at the institution for her Master's degree in 1998 and PhD in 2004. During her post-doctoral fellowship at UBC, she was the recipient of the Alice Wilson Award from the Royal Society of Canada and a 2006 Career Investigator Award.

== Career ==
Upon completing her post-doctoral fellowship in 2006, Liu-Ambrose joined the faculty at UBC as an assistant professor in their Department of Physical Therapy. While serving as an assistant professor, she focused on preventing both neurocognitive and physical decline in older adults. In 2010, she led the Brain Power Study which found that "12 months of once-weekly or twice-weekly progressive strength training improved executive cognitive function" in women between the ages of 65 and 75 years old. The follow-up study became the first to prove that both cognitive and economic benefits were sustained after formal cessation of a tailored exercise program. Two years later, her research team also led the first randomized controlled trial to "compare the efficacy of both resistance and aerobic training to improve executive cognitive functions necessary for independent living." The results showed that implementing a seniors’ exercise program could improve their neurocognitive and physical decline.

As a result of her research into preventing both neurocognitive and physical decline in older adults, Liu-Ambrose was appointed a Tier 2 Canada Research Chair of Physical Activity, Mobility, and Cognitive Neuroscience in 2012. Following her appointment, Liu-Ambrose was also named the co-director of the Centre for Hip Health and Mobility alongside David Wilson and Pierre Guy. She was later elected to the Royal Society of Canada's College of New Scholars, Artists and Scientists.

During the COVID-19 pandemic, Liu-Ambrose was one of three principal investigators of the Canadian Longitudinal Study on Aging Covid-19 Study: Understanding the Impact of COVID-19 on Brain Health. The aim of the project was to investigate the impact of COVID-19 on cognitive function, brain structure and brain function in adults aged 55 to 80 years. In 2021, Liu-Ambrose was elected to the Canadian Academy of Health Sciences and named the recipient of the John McNeill Excellence in Health Research Mentorship Award.
