= Anne S. Bassett =

Canadian psychiatrist

Anne S. Bassett CM

Academic work
- Discipline: Psychiatry
- Institutions: University of Toronto

Anne Susan Bassett CM is a Canadian psychiatrist, specifically in mental behaviour. She is a full professor and Canada Research Chair in Schizophrenia Genetics and Genomic Disorders at University of Toronto. Bassett is also a Clinician Scientist at CAMH and a Senior Scientist at the Toronto General Research Institute. As a result of her work in psychiatry, Bassett was awarded a Distinguished Fellowship from the American Psychiatric Association.

She was appointed as a Member of the Order of Canada in 2023. She currently resides in Toronto.
