= Jean-Luc Boulay =

French-born canadian chef and television personality

Jean-Luc Boulay CQ
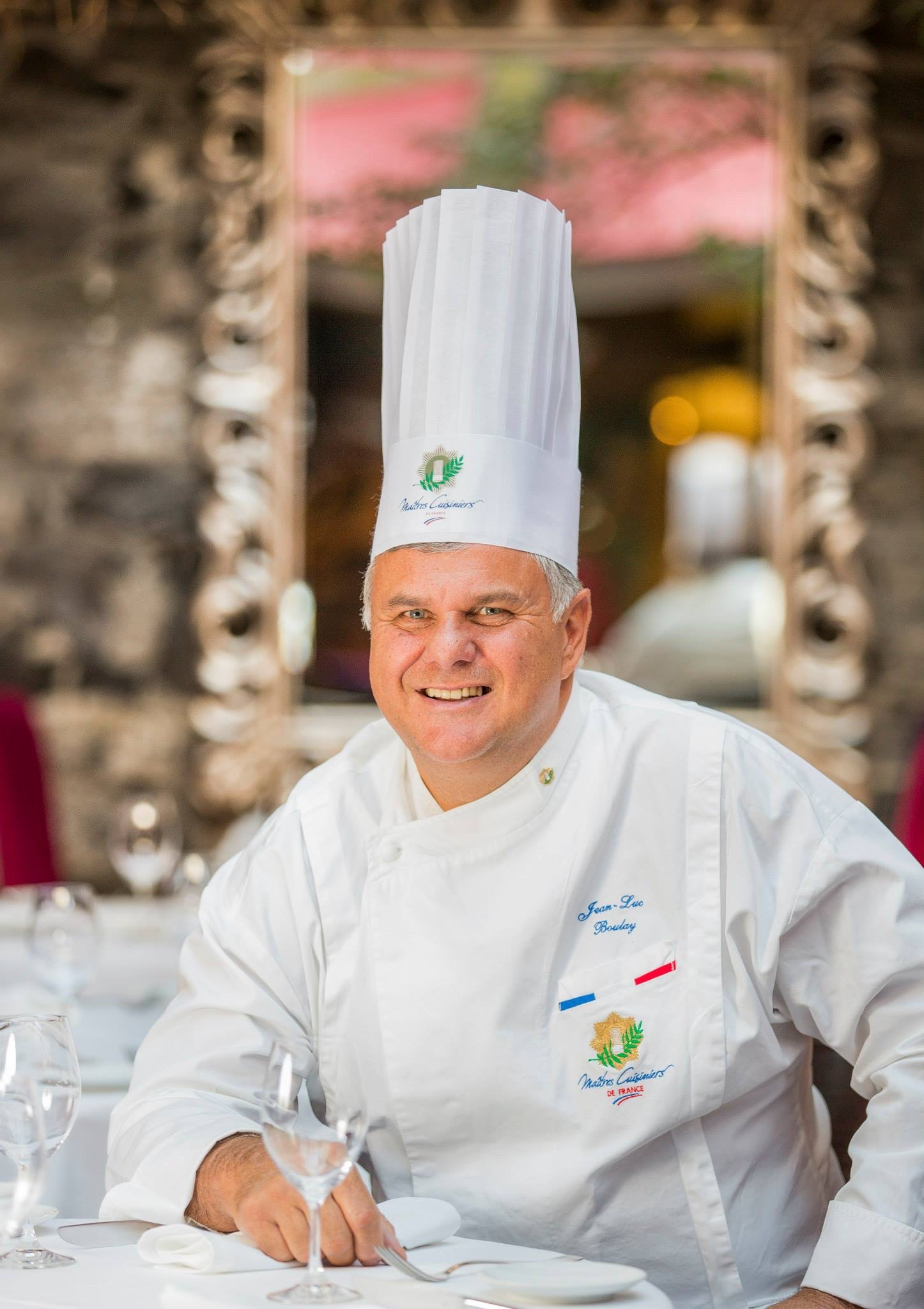
- Born: 1955 (age 70–71); Marolles-les-Braults, Sarthe, Pays de la Loire, France
- Culinary career
- Cooking style: French gastronomy, Québec-inspired Nordic cuisine, Foie Gras
- Current restaurant(s): Le Saint-Amour, Chez Boulay - Bistro boréal, Les Botanistes
- Television show: Quebec’s top cooking competition TV show Les chefs! broadcast on ICI Radio-Canada Télé since 14 June 2010

Jean-Luc Boulay CQ (born 1955) is a French-born chef, restaurateur and television personality who emigrated to Canada in 1976, and founded his first restaurant Le Saint-Amour in Quebec City with his business partner Jacques Fortier in 1978, which over the years was repeatedly honoured and is recognized as one of the best fine dining restaurants in Quebec and Canada, specializing in local products such as foie gras, and also known as Paul McCartney’s favourite restaurant in town. In April 2012, he opened with chef Arnaud Marchand a Nordic-inspired restaurant, Chez Boulay - Bistro boréal, located on rue Saint-Jean, a lively street of Old Quebec. In April 2019, he also opened the restaurant Les Botanistes which pays particular homage to plant-based dishes, with his business partners Pierre Joubaud and Arnaud Marchand.

Along with Normand Laprise and Pasquale Vari, Jean-Luc Boulay is one of the three permanent judges on Quebec’s top cooking competition TV show Les chefs!, which has been broadcast on ICI Radio-Canada Télé since 2010 for 13 seasons, and hosted by Élyse Marquis et Daniel Vézina.

Boulay's recognition and awards include being named French Master Chef (Maître cuisiner de France) in March 2012, Officer to the Ordre National du Mérite Agricole in France in 2017, and Chevalier to the Ordre national du Québec in 2024.
