= Deanne Fitzpatrick =

Canadian artist

Deanne Fitzpatrick CM
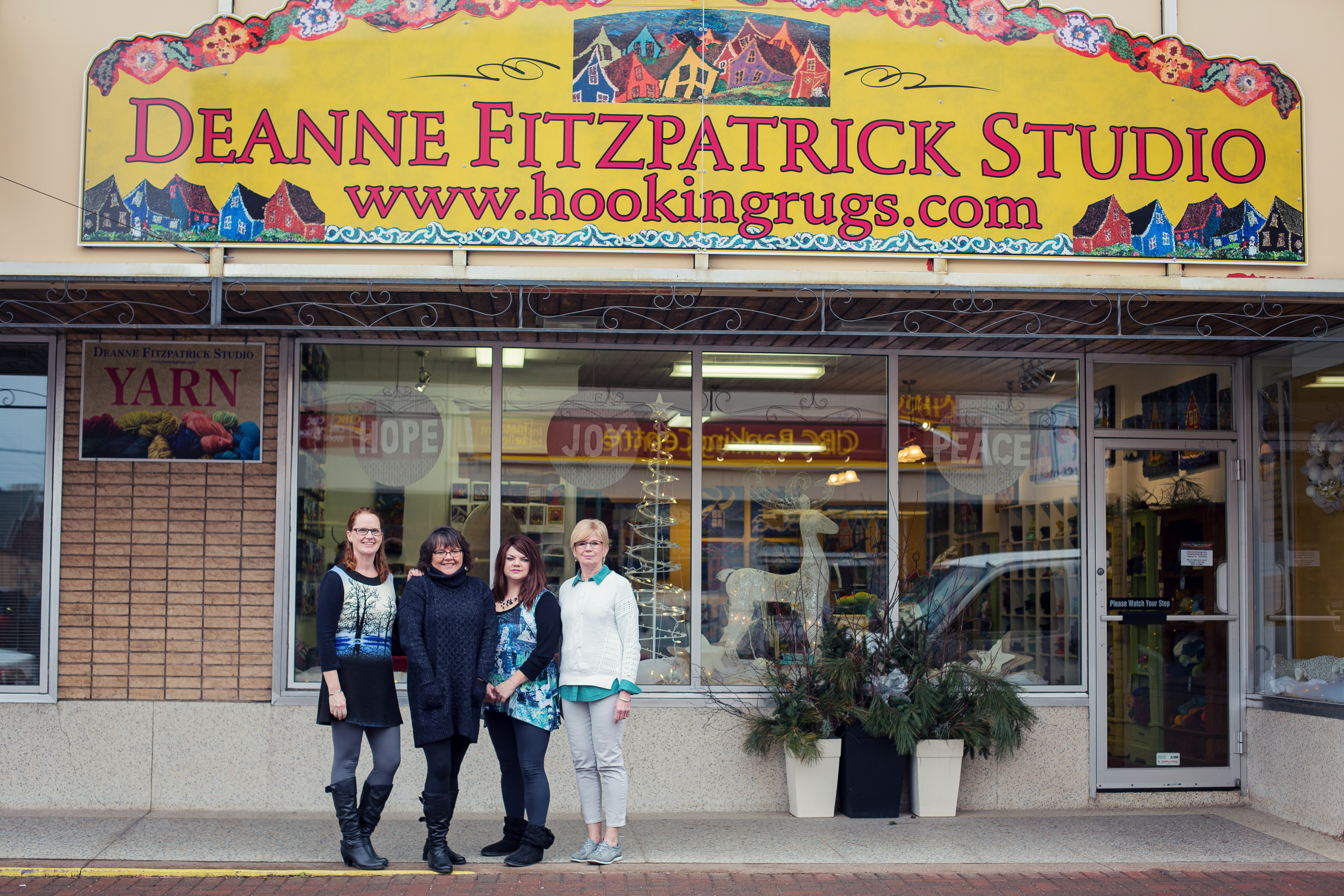
- Deanne Fitzpatrick and friends in front of her studio
- Born: Placentia Bay, Newfoundland and Labrador, Canada
- Known for: Rug-hooking
- Awards: Order of Canada
- Website: hookingrugs.com

Deanne Fitzpatrick CM is a Canadian artist based in Amherst, Nova Scotia. Born in Placentia Bay, Newfoundland, she started hooking rugs in 1990 and now operates a studio in Amherst where she sells and displays her work. Fitzpatrick's work is on display in permanent collections at the Art Gallery of Nova Scotia, the Canadian Museum of History, the Nova Scotia Art Bank and the Art Gallery of Newfoundland and Labrador. In 2016, she was named Canadian Rug Hooking Artist of the Year by the Hooked Rug Museum of North America. She was awarded the Order of Canada in 2023 in recognition of her contributions to rug-hooking as an art form.

== Publications ==
- Fitzpatrick, Deanne (1999). Hook Me a Story: The History and Method of Rug Hooking in Atlantic Canada. Nimbus Publishing. ISBN 978-1-5510-9279-9.
- — (2005). Secrets of Planning & Designing a Hand-Hooked Rug. Huxley Communication. ISBN 978-1-8819-8245-6.
- — (2006). East Coast Rug-Hooking Designs: New Patterns from an Old Tradition. Nimbus Publishing. ISBN 978-1-5510-9569-1.
- — (2010). Inspired Rug Hooking: Turning Atlantic Canadian Life into Art. Nimbus Publishing. ISBN 978-1-5510-9780-0.
- —; Fitch, Sheree (2013). Singily Skipping Along. Nimbus Publishing. ISBN 978-1-7710-8091-0.
- — (2014). Simply Modern: Contemporary Design for Hooked Rugs. Nimbus Publishing. ISBN 978-1-7710-8216-7.
- — (2016). Rug Hooking with Deanne Fitzpatrick. Ampry Publishing. ISBN 978-0-8117-1767-0.
- — (2019). Making a Life: Twenty-five Years of Hooking Rugs. Nimbus Publishing. ISBN 978-1-7710-8723-0.
- — (2021). Meditations for Makers: Daily Affirmations for a Creative Life. Nimbus Publishing. ISBN 978-1-7747-1002-9.
- — (2022). The Sunday Letters. [s.p.] ISBN 978-1-7387-2760-5.
- — (2025). Landscape Rug Hooking: A Painterly Approach to Creating the Landscapes You Love. Schiffer Craft. ISBN 978-0-7643-7001-4.
