= Wenona Giles =

York University professor and Fellow of the Royal Society of Canada

Professor Wenona Giles OC FRSC
- Born: Abadan, Iran
- Citizenship: Canadian
- Occupation: Professor Emerita. York University
- Spouse(s): Peter Murphy. Retired CTV News Journalist and Anchor

Academic background
- Education: B.A., English and French Literature, Santa Clara University; M.A., PhD, Anthropology, University of Toronto
- Thesis: (1987)
- Doctoral advisor: Gavin Alderson Smith

Academic work
- Discipline: Social Cultural Anthropology
- Sub-discipline: forced migration, globalization, gender, nationalism and war
- Institutions: York University
- Website: www.yorku.ca/wgiles

Wenona Mary Giles OC FRSC is a professor emerita in the Department of Anthropology at York University. In 2018, she was elected a Fellow of the Royal Society of Canada. In 2024 she was appointed an Officer of the Order of Canada. Through the university, Giles helped launch the Borderless Higher Education for Refugees (BHER) project which allowed people in refugee camps to earn degrees, diplomas and certificates from Moi and Kenyatta Universities in Kenya, and from York University and UBC in Canada.

== Early life and education ==
Although she was born in Iran, Giles holds both UK and Canadian citizenship.

After earning her Bachelor of Arts at Santa Clara University in 1971, Giles earned her Master's degree and PhD in Anthropology at the University of Toronto. Her dissertation was titled "Motherhood and Wage Labour in London: Portuguese Migrant Women and the Politics of Gender."

== Career ==
In the early 1990s Giles began teaching at York University in Toronto and became a research associate of York's Centre for Refugee Studies. In 1993, she began to coordinate the international Women in Conflict Zones Research Network based at the Centre for Refugee Studies. Around this time she also published "Maid in the Market: Women's Paid Domestic Labour". Giles co-coordinated the Women in Conflict Zones Research Network, (with Maja Korac), until 2004. That same year, she co-edited (with Jennier Hyndman) the book "Sites of Violence: Gender and Conflict Zones." The book is composed of essays using a feminist lens to understand how conflict and war are gendered and racialized.

From 2005 to 2008, Giles was the principal investigator for a Social Sciences and Humanities Research Council (SSHRC) funded project titled "The Globalization of Homelessness in Long-Term Refugee Camps." With Jennifer Hyndman, she developed the "A Canadian Refugee Research Network: Globalizing Knowledge," that was part of their project titled "The Globalization of Protracted Refugee Situations" (GPRS) initiative. The goal of this initiative was to understand the reasons for and impacts of long-term refugee situations. Building on that project, Giles led and developed the Borderless Higher Education for Refugees (BHER) project with Don Dippo from 2011 through the Centre for Refugee Studies at York University. In February 2013, the Canadian International Development Agency granted them more than $4.5 million over a five-year period to help launch BHER. The following month, Giles was recognized by York University as a research leader at the 2013 Research Gala.

In 2013, with the assistance of Don Dippo and York's Centre for Refugee Studies, Giles launched the Borderless Higher Education for Refugees (BHER) project. In October 2015, 59 people in a Dadaab refugee camp began to earn certificates, diplomas and degrees from Moi and Kenyatta universities in Kenya and York and UBC in Canada. The Project continues to this day in the Dadaab and Kakuma camps in Kenya.

In 2016, Giles co-authored a book with Jennifer Hyndman titled "Refugees in Extended Exile: Living on the Edge." The book was critical of contemporary humanitarian aid efforts and the vulnerable status of refugees.

Besides refugees, Giles has also focused her research on the lives of Portuguese women in Toronto and London, UK. In 2017, she donated her research conducted in the 1980s and 1990s to the Clara Thomas Archives and Special Collections at the York University Libraries.

Giles retired from York University in October 2018 but is still a Research Associate in the Centre for Refugee Studies. A month after her retirement, she was elected a Fellow of the Royal Society of Canada.

She was appointed as an Officer of the Order of Canada in 2023.

== Selected bibliography ==
The following is a list of publications by Giles:

- Maid in the Market: Women's Paid Domestic Labour (1994)
- Development & Diaspora: Gender and the Refugee Experience with Helene Moussa and Penny Van Esterik (1996)
- Portuguese Women in Toronto: Gender, Immigration, and Nationalism (2002)
- Feminists Under Fire: Exchanges Across War Zones editor (2003)
- Sites of Violence: Gender and Conflict Zones with Jennifer Hyndman (2004)
- Portuguese Women in Toronto: Gender (2012)
- When care goes global: locating the social relations of domestic work (2014)
- Refugees in Extended Exile: Living on the Edge with Jennifer Hyndman (2017)
- A Better Future: The Role of Higher Education for Displaced and Marginalized People with Jacqueline Bhabha and Faraaz Mahomed. (2020).
