= Pseudomonas Genome Database =

Database of genomic annotations

Content
- Description: comparative genomics for Pseudomonas genomes.
- Organisms: Pseudomonas

Contact
- Research center: Simon Fraser University
- Laboratory: Department of Molecular Biology and Biochemistry
- Authors: Geoffrey L Winsor
- Primary citation: Winsor & al. (2011)

Access
- Website: www.pseudomonas.com

The Pseudomonas Genome Database is a database of genomic annotations for Pseudomonas genomes.
