= Scott Halperin =

Canadian immunologist, professor of pediatrics, microbiology, and immunology

Scott Halperin is a Canadian immunologist, professor of pediatrics, microbiology, and immunology at Dalhousie University, the head of Pediatric Infection Diseases at IWK Health Centre, and the director of the Canadian Center for Vaccinology.

== Biography ==
Halperin received a B.Sc. from Stanford University, and an M.D. from Cornell University. He did his postdoctoral research in pediatric infectious diseases at the University of Virginia and University of Minnesota.

== Career ==
Halperin's research focuses on pertussis and other vaccine-preventable diseases. In 2020, the Canadian Centre for Vaccinology at Dalhousie University was approved by Health Canada to begin clinical trial for a potential COVID-19 vaccine, led by Halperin. Halperin's research also focuses on public health policy in relation to the COVID-19 pandemic.

== Awards ==
From 2004 to 2009, Halperin held the CIHR/Wyeth Pharmaceuticals clinical research chair in vaccines. He received a certificate of merit from the Canadian Paediatric Society in 2009, as well as the Max Forman Senior Research Prize from the Dalhousie Medical Research Foundation, also in 2009.
