= Régine Laurent =

Haitian Canadian nurse (born 1957)

- Born: 9 October 1957 (age 68); Port-au-Prince, Haiti
- Occupation: Nurse
- Notable work: Head of Quebec's Special Commission on the Rights of the Child and Youth Protection

Régine Laurent OQ (born 1957) is a Haitian Canadian nurse who from 1980 spent 35 years working at Montreal's Santa-Cabrini Hospital. From 2009 to 2017, as the first black woman to head the Fédération interprofessionnelle de la santé du Québec (FlQ), the trade union for health services in the Province of Quebec, she successfully negotiated improved conditions for health workers from the provincial government. In May 2019, she was appointed head of Quebec's Special Commission on the Rights of the Child and Youth Protection.

== Early life ==
Born on 9 October 1957 in Port-au-Prince, Haiti, Régine Laurent was brought up in a well-to-do home together with her two brothers. Her father was a lawyer and her mother, a schoolteacher. When she was 11, the family emigrated to Canada, settling in Montreal. While studying nursing at the Cégep, she gave birth to her first son when she was 18.

== Career ==
After obtaining her diploma in 1979, she was engaged as a nurse of the Santa Cabrini Hospital in February 1980, after which she gave birth to her second son. She worked in several departments, including the postpartum unit which she loved. When she was unable to obtain summer holidays around 1983, she became involved in the hospital's union, becoming its president in 1985. During the 1990s, she served in various union positions. She left her partner, bringing up her children alone with the assistance of her mother. In 2004, Laurent became president of the nurses union Alliance interprofessionnelle de Montréal (AIM), a position she maintained until 2009. As such, she headed a union with some 6,000 members, including nurses and therapists from Montreal, Montérégie and Laval. In 2009, she was elected president of the Fédération interprofessionnelle de la santé du Québec.

Her action as a trade unionist included the strikes of 1989 and above all 1999, which demonstrated the importance of maintaining stability in health units and established a modern perspective in trade unionism for nurses, namely a clear focus on the patient.

In May 2019, Régine Laurent was appointed head of Quebec's Special Commission on the Rights of the Child and Youth Protection.

== Recognition ==
On Laurent's retirement from the FlQ in 2017, the members of the National Assembly of Quebec paid tribute to the "exceptional career of Régine Laurent" in a message which concluded: "Lastly, that it fully recognize Régine Laurent’s contribution to the advancement of equality for women, people from culturally diverse communities and workers in our society." Laurent was named an Officer of the National Order of Quebec in 2024.
