= Deborah Money =

Canadian obstetric and gynaecological infectious disease specialist

Deborah Money CM

Academic background
- Education: BSc, Microbiology; MD, 1985, University of British Columbia

Deborah McColl Money CM is a Canadian obstetric and gynaecological infectious disease specialist. As a professor at the University of British Columbia, she was the first non-US President of the Infectious Diseases Society for Obstetrics and Gynecology from 2010 until 2012.

== Early life and education ==
Money was born to Scottish-Canadian parents Irene and Tom, a Professor Emeritus in Chemistry at the University of British Columbia (UBC). Growing up, she attended Crofton House School where she earned a job working in Edith and Pat McGeer's laboratory on UBC's Point Grey campus helping with basic tasks. Money earned her Bachelor of Science and medical degree from UBC, followed by her residency in Obstetrics and Gynecology. As she completed her residency, Money joined the Infectious Diseases Society for Obstetrics and Gynecology and accepted a fellowship in reproductive infectious diseases at the University of Washington.

== Career ==
Following her fellowship, Money returned to Canada and became the first individual in the country with this combined training. She subsequently joined the Oak Tree Clinic and worked with David Patrick to convince the provincial government to institute universal testing for all pregnant women. She also began specializing in obstetric and gynecological infectious diseases at B.C. Women's Hospital & Health Centre.

As a professor at UBC, Money became the first non-US President of the Infectious Diseases Society for Obstetrics and Gynecology from 2010 until 2012. While serving in this role, she received funding from the Canadian Institutes of Health Research and Genome British Columbia to research how micro-organisms affect human health. Her project used genome sequencing tools to determine what contributes to a healthy balance of microorganisms in the vagina, and how an imbalance may be associated with preterm delivery, genital tract infection and overall reproductive health. Upon stepping down as president, Money began leading the Vancouver portion of a national study on how pregnant women who have been vaccinated can pass on antibodies to their baby. In recognition of her academic achievements, Money received the 2013 Woman of Distinction Award in the Technology, Science & Research category from the YWCA Metro Vancouver and was awarded the Queen Elizabeth II Diamond Jubilee Medal.

In 2016, Money was appointed Executive Vice Dean of the Faculty of Medicine where she would "provide operational leadership to Department Heads and School Directors, as well as oversight of academic standards and the administrative functions of the Faculty." While serving in this role, Money became the lead investigator for the HPV in HIV Study Group which studied the safety and potential efficacy of vaccination against the human papillomavirus (HPV) in HIV-positive women. In recognition of her accomplishments, Money was the recipient of the Women's Health Research Institute's Career Contribution to Women's Health Research Award and Lifetime Achievement Award from the Infectious Diseases Society of Obstetrics and Gynecology.

In her final year as Executive Vice Dean of the Faculty of Medicine, Money was awarded a Red Ribbon Award from AIDS Vancouver in recognition of her "years of work and dedication to help support people living with HIV/AIDS." During the COVID-19 pandemic in Canada, Money received $3.1 million in funding from the COVID-19 Immunity Task Force to research antenatal serum samples of pregnant women. The aim was to track trends in the level of SARS-CoV-2 infection amongst pregnant women in all provinces and territories of Canada. She also announced her decision to not stand for reappointment of Executive Vice-Dean following her term ending June 30, 2020.

She was appointed as a Member of the Order of Canada in 2023. She currently resides in Vancouver.
