= Vienna Declaration (drug policy) =

The Vienna Declaration (2010) was a call for evidence-based drug policies prompted by the failure of traditional drug policies in the HIV/AIDS pandemic.

== Background ==
The Vienna Declaration was published in July 2010 prior to the XVIII International AIDS Conference, 2010 (AIDS 2010), which took place on 18–23 July 2010. The conference's focus was on human rights and its quintessential role in HIV/AIDS pandemic response. The Vienna Declaration was the second formal declaration in an International AIDS Conference, the first was the Durban Declaration (2000). The declaration was a communal effort by: the International AIDS Society, the International Centre for Science in Drug Policy (ICSDP), and the British Columbia Centre for Excellence in HIV/AIDS. The Lancet published a copy of the Vienna Declaration text along with a series of articles and comments on HIV in people who use drugs within the same period of the declaration's release. It initially had its own website (www.viennadelcaration.com) which contained: statements of support, an overview of the declaration. The website has since been taken down. By the end of the conference, the Vienna Declaration had 12,725 signatures.

In 2010, human rights and universal access in HIV/AIDS responses were the central focus of HIV/AIDS organizations, governments, stakeholders, etc. The 1988 IV International AIDS Conference marked a shift — biomedical to social, political, economic, and human rights — in the perspective from which HIV/AIDS was viewed. Target 6.B of the Millennium Development Goals set 2010 as the target year for universal access to HIV/AIDS treatment, prevention, and services. The Declaration of Commitment (2001) set 2010 as a target year to meet specified population goals. The Political Declaration of Commitment (2006) emphasized the importance of government participation, in addition to all other organizations, agencies and individual, in creating an environment conducive to HIV/AIDS prevention, intervention, and services by ensuring human rights and individual freedoms.

The Great Recession reduced the amount of public funding given towards HIV/AIDS organizations and causes.

== Vienna Declaration ==
The declaration listed the harms of the traditional, punitive drug policies and offered drug-policy recommendations in the harm reduction category as alternatives.

== Harms of traditional drug policies ==
=== Financial ===
The "War on Drugs" drug control policy was a failure, money spent was not only wasted but served to actually cause more damage to society.

A macroeconomic black drug market – valued at $320 billion a year, or the 21st economy in the world – emerged because of traditional drug policies.

=== Social and human rights ===
The criminalization of drug users has led to the highest global incarceration rates, in which racial disparities at the disproportionately-targeting hands of drug-law enforcement are evident. The incarceration rates change entire community social structures, and in turn functions.

Severe human rights violations have been committed at the expense of punitive drug control methods. Individuals have been forced to trade portions of their civil rights in exchange for security.

=== Health and HIV ===
The criminalization of drug users — and their subsequent institutionalization — increases the amount, severity and frequency of HIV epidemics within that cohort. The epidemics are exacerbated because institutions have little to no HIV prevention services.
