= Non-Insured Health Benefits =

The Non-Insured Health Benefits (NIHB) program provides medically necessary coverage for eligible First Nations and Inuit in Canada. It is administered by Health Canada and covers benefit claims for certain drugs, dental care, vision care, medical supplies and equipment, short-term crisis intervention mental health counselling, and medical transportation. In Canada, provinces and territories deliver health care services, which can be accessed by First Nations people and Inuit. The NIHB program provides health-related goods and services not insured by provinces and territories or other private insurance plans.

Health care providers must submit cases to Health Canada for review to access all vision care, transportation, and counselling, most dental, medical supplies and equipment benefits, and for some drug benefits.

== Overview ==
The NIHB program covers a range of healthcare benefits, including:

- Prescription drugs (from a managed formulary)
- Dental care
- Vision care
- Medical supplies and equipment (MS&E)
- Short-term crisis-intervention mental health counselling
- Medical transportation to access necessary care

A key principle of NIHB is that it acts as a payer of last resort—services must be accessed first through provincial, territorial, or private private plans, and only residual needs are covered by NIHB.

== Coverage of benefits ==
Benefits are considered for coverage when:

- listed on an NIHB benefit list or schedule
- intended for home or other ambulatory care settings
- prior approval or predetermination is obtained (if required)
- unavailable through other health or social programs
- prescribed by a licensed health professional
- provided by a recognized provider.

== Eligibility ==
Non-insured health benefits are available for eligible First Nations people and Inuit in Canada, as well as infants under one year whose parent is eligible.

=== Inuit ===
Inuit must be Canadian residents and must be beneficiaries of the Nunavut Land Claims Agreement or beneficiaries of the Inuvialuit Final Agreement. Inuit living in Nunavut or the Northwest Territories are automatically registered for the program when they receive their territorial health care card. If they live outside the land claim settlement area they must register with the land claim organization and provide documentation to the government to receive an 'N' number, a personal identification number.

=== First Nations ===
First Nations people must be Canadian residents and a Registered Indian according to the Indian Act in order to access NIHB programs.

== Recent updates (2023–2025) ==
A list of recent NIHB program updates highlights improvements and policy changes:

- March 2025:
  - Expanded Shingrix (herpes zoster vaccine) coverage
  - New feeding supply replacement guidelines
  - Recognition of registered dietitians as recommenders for breast pumps
  - Single-use negative-pressure wound therapy now covered (up to 8 weeks)
- December 2024:
  - Paxlovid authorized as an open benefit (no prior approval needed) for COVID-19 treatment
  - Biologic drug coverage adjusted in Alberta and Atlantic regions under biosimilar policy
- Other notable changes (2023–2024):
  - Guardian insulin pump kits and sensor coverage for type 1 diabetes (patients ≤19)
  - Removal of prior-approval restriction on sole prescribers under client safety measures
  - Open coverage for mesalazine, naloxone auto-injectors/nasal spray, and Slynd (drospirenone)

== Controversy ==
Health Canada asserts the program exists to support First Nations people and Inuit in reaching an overall health status that is comparable with other Canadians. Many First Nations groups assert that health benefits are an inherent Aboriginal and treaty right and are constitutionally protected.

Only Treaty 6 specifically mentions health care, which includes a clause for a medicine chest to be held at the Indian agent's home and a clause for emergency help. Other treaty negotiations included a discussion about medical services, and doctors were often in attendance when treaty annuities were paid out. The medicine chest clause and historical documentation of treaty discussions have been interpreted by First Nations groups to signal a responsibility for the government to provide ongoing healthcare.

From the government of Canada's perspective, there were no statutory or treaty obligations for providing health care to Indigenous people, though health services would be provided when medically necessary. Though they recognized that medical care had been written into Treaty 6, the government provided health services on humanitarian rather than on legal grounds.

== Drug Benefit List ==
The Drug Benefit List (DBL) is a list of drugs that are covered by the NIHB program. Updates are issued quarterly and drugs are frequently added or removed from the list. The DBL also provides a tool for doctors and pharmacists to encourage the use of generic drugs.
