= Association of Medical Microbiology and Infectious Disease Canada =

Canadian medical specialty organization

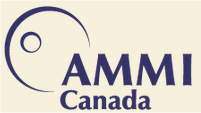
- Predecessor: The Canadian Association of Medical Microbiology (CAMM) and the Canadian Infectious Diseases Society (CIDS)
- Founded: 2004
- Type: Non-profit professional association
- Purpose: Medical Microbiology and Infectious Diseases
- Headquarters: 192 Bank Street; Ottawa, Ontario; K2P 1W8
- Region served: Canada
- Key people: Todd Hatchet (President); Sarah Forgie (President-Elect); Caroline Quach-Thanh (Past-President)
- Website: ammi.ca

The Association of Medical Microbiology and Infectious Disease Canada (AMMI Canada) is a Canadian national medical specialty association composed of specialists in infectious diseases and medical microbiology, clinical microbiologists and researchers specializing in preventing, diagnosing, and treating infections. The association is a national specialty society recognized by the Royal College of Physicians and Surgeons of Canada. The association promotes the prevention, diagnosis, and treatment of human infectious diseases through our involvement in education, research, clinical practice and patient advocacy. Position papers and guidelines in support of this mission are published in the official Journal of the Association of Medical Microbiology and Infectious Diseases - JAMMI (an open access journal) and/or posted on the organization's website. Prior to January 1, 2016, these were published in the Canadian Journal of Infectious Diseases and Medical Microbiology The annual meeting of the association occurs in the spring at which members present information of mutual interest.

== History ==
AMMI Canada was formed in 2004 with the merger between the Canadian Association of Medical Microbiology (CAMM) and the Canadian Infectious Diseases Society (CIDS). CAMM was incorporated under the Companies Act in 1961 under the name of the Canadian Association of Medical Bacteriologists while CIDS was formed in 1977. The organizations formed in recognition of the similar "activities, interests, and goals for infectious diseases and medical microbiology specialists."

== Governance ==
AMMI Canada is governed by a Council composed of thirteen members: the President, President-Elect, Past President, Treasurer, Secretary, Medical Microbiology Section Chair, Infectious Disease Section Chair, and six Members of Council. The council also has three ex-officio members.

AMMI Canada's vision is: "Fewer infections. Fewer outbreaks. Healthy Canadians" and its mission is to "advance the prevention, diagnosis, and treatment of infections." AMMI Canada's strategic planning goals and initiatives are defined in six areas. These are: antimicrobial stewardship and resistance, infection prevention and control, education and knowledge translation, advocacy, human health resources planning and research. Specific details are available on the Association website.

== Partnerships ==
The association collaborates with the Canadian Foundation for Infectious Diseases in raising money to support infectious diseases research in support of its mission. Corporate partners of the CFID include AbbVie, BD, BioMérieux, Gilead Sciences, KPMG, Merck, and Sunovion.

== Education ==
AMMI Canada's principal event is the AMMI Canada-CACMID Annual Conference, jointly hosted with the Canadian Association for Clinical Microbiology and Infectious Diseases (CACMID). The conference typically takes place in April, and has been hosted in cities such as Charlottetown, PEI (2015), Victoria, BC (2014), Québec City, QC (2013), Vancouver, BC (2012), Montréal, QC (2011), and Edmonton, AB (2010). The 2016 meeting was held in Vancouver. Abstracts of the meeting are available in the official journal.

The AMMI Canada-CACMID Annual Conference is host to the awards and student awards presentations, where AMMI Canada's Distinguished Service Award, Lifetime Achievement Award, Honorary Membership, and Residency Fellowships are presented. The Annual Conference is also where other organizations, such as CACMID, the Canadian College of Microbiologists, and the Canadian Foundation for Infectious Diseases present their awards.

Attendees of the Annual Conference can also obtain Continuing Education Credits.

In addition to the organization's joint conference, AMMI Canada also collaborated with the Canadian Paediatric Society for co-developed learning opportunities at the 2014 Canadian Immunization Conference held in December 2014.
