= British Columbia Centre for Disease Control =

BC Centre for Disease Control
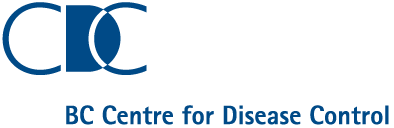

Agency overview
- Preceding agencies: Special Health and Treatment Services (1955); Vancouver Bureau (1977); British Columbia Centre for Disease Control (1986)
- Jurisdiction: British Columbia
- Headquarters: 655 West 12th Avenue Vancouver, BC, Canada
- Agency executive: Dr. Réka Gustafson, Vice President, Public Health and Wellness and Deputy Provincial Health Officer
- Parent agency: Provincial Health Services Authority
- Website: Official website

The BC Centre for Disease Control (BCCDC) is the public health arm for British Columbia's Provincial Health Services Authority.

The BCCDC is located at 655 West 12th Avenue, Vancouver, BC. The centre has tuberculosis and sexually transmitted infections (STI) clinics as well as outreach clinics in high prevalence areas throughout BC.

The BCCDC is the centralized purchaser of all non-travel vaccines for the province, is responsible for provincial environmental health issues and carries out both public health and medical sciences research. It aims to provide provincial and national leadership in public health through "surveillance, detection, treatment, prevention and consultation" services. It also aims to provide analytical and policy support to all levels of government and health authorities. It is linked to the University of British Columbia for research and teaching.

== Organizational service lines ==
- Clinical Prevention Services (CPS)
- Communicable Diseases and Immunization Services (CDIS)
- Environmental Health Services (EHS)

== Partnerships ==
The BCCDC maintains partnerships with organizations throughout Canada, including regional health authorities, the Government of British Columbia, the University of British Columbia, Simon Fraser University, the Public Health Agency of Canada, Health Canada, BC Communicable Disease Policy Advisory Committee, and the BC environmental Health Policy Committee.

=== Foundation ===
The BCCDC Foundation for Public Health is the charitable partner of the BCCDC, engaging donors and partners to raise funds for initiatives to address issues such as vaccine uptake, environmental health risks and communicable diseases. The foundation accepts donations from members of the public, government agencies, philanthropic organizations and the health care and pharmaceutical industries. Funds are allocated to broad or specific programs including supporting scientific research at academic institutions like the University of British Columbia, as well as agencies responding to public health emergencies such as COVID-19 and the opioid epidemic.

Donors to the foundation include:

- AbbVie
- Alere
- BioMérieux
- Blackbird Interactive
- British Columbia Teachers' Federation (BCTF)
- Canadian Pharmacists Association
- Congregation Beth Israel
- Electronic Arts
- Gilead Sciences
- GlaxoSmithKline
- Janssen Pharmaceuticals
- LifeLabs
- London Drugs
- Merck
- New England Biolabs
- Orbis Investment Management
- Pacific Blue Cross
- PAX Technology
- Pfizer
- Provincial Health Services Authority (PHSA)
- Randstad Interim
- RBC Foundation
- Roche
- Salesforce
- Sanofi
- Stingray Radio
- Teradici
- Unbounded Canada Foundation
- Vancouver Dispensary Society
- Vancouver Foundation

== Public health activities ==
=== COVID-19 ===
On April 30, 2020, the BCCDC published guidance alongside the BC Ministry of Health on interpreting the results of polymerase chain reaction (PCR) tests for detection of SARS-CoV-2, the virus that causes COVID-19.

== Notable people ==
- Jennifer Gardy, deputy director of Surveillance, Data and Epidemiology at the Bill & Melinda Gates Foundation
- Reka Gustafson, Vice President of Public Health and Wellness at BCCDC, and Deputy Provincial Health Officer under the BC Ministry of Health
- Agatha Jassem, head of the Virology Lab at British Columbia Centre for Disease Control, Public Health Laboratory
- Mel Krajden, medical director at the British Columbia Centre for Disease Control, Public Health Laboratory
