= List of members of the Order of Manitoba =

The following is a full list of members of the Order of Manitoba, both past and current, in order of their date of appointment.

== 1999 and 2000s ==
=== 1999 ===
- Peter Liba, CM OM

=== 2000 ===
- Edward R. Schreyer, PC CC CMM CD
- W. John McKeag, CM CD
- Pearl McGonigal, CM
- Yvon Dumont, KStJ
- Duff Roblin, PC CC
- Howard R. Pawley, PC OC
- Israel H. Asper, OC QC
- Robert Beamish, CM
- Burton Cummings, OC
- James M. C. Daly
- R. E. "Reg" Forbes
- Edwin Jebb
- Sol Kanee, OC
- Mary Kelekis
- Susan Lambert
- Leo Mol, OC RCA
- Alfred M. Monnin, OC QC
- William Norrie, CM QC
- David Northcott
- Pamela Blanche Rebello
- Strini Reddy
- Mary Richard
- George Taylor Richardson
- Roger Marshall Smith
- Arnold T. Spohr
- Baldur R. Stefansson, OC
- Bramwell Bernard Tovey

=== 2001 ===
- Lloyd Axworthy, PC OC
- Clarence Lyle Barber, OC
- Heather Bishop, OC
- Hyacinth Colomb
- Gary Albert Filmon, PC OC
- Richard Martin
- Carol Shields, CC FRSC
- Gwendolyn E. Wishart

=== 2002 ===
- Bill Brace
- Saul M. Cherniack, PC CM QC
- Adrian Darveau, OMI
- Ajit Kaur Doel
- Naranjan S. Dhalla, CM FRSC
- Tina Keeper
- Sterling R. W. Lyon, PC OC
- Frederick George McGuinness, CM
- Leonore M. Saunders
- Murray Smith
- E. Jane Ursel

=== 2003 ===
- Monty Hall
- Elaine Ali
- Leonard A. Bateman
- James Arthur Coulter
- Charles E. Curtis, FCA
- Joseph Du, CM
- Waldron N. Fox-Decent, CM CMM OM CD
- Wesley C. Lorimer
- Loreena McKennitt, CM
- Arnold Naimark, OC FRSC
- Nelia Premachuk
- Clarence Tillenius, CM
- Larry Phillip "Phil" Fontaine

=== 2004 ===
- John Harvard, PC
- Leonard Joseph Cariou
- Thérèse Champagne
- Harvey Max Chochinov, FRSC FCAHS
- Henry G. Friesen, CC FRSC
- Virginia Guiang
- Benjamin Hewak
- Vern Hildahl
- Samuel M. Katz
- Arthur V. Mauro, OC QC
- Don Robertson
- Val Werier, CM
- June Marion James

=== 2005 ===
- Randy Bachman
- Gladys Evelyn Cook
- Albert D. Friesen
- Irene Grant
- Chander Gupta
- Edward Head
- Terrance Hind
- Martin Johnson
- Ovide Mercredi
- Kathleen M. Richardson
- Glenora Slimmon
- Maurice Strong

=== 2006 ===
- Neil Bardal
- Jennifer Botterill
- James W. Burns
- Albert Cerilli
- Eileen Collins
- Arnold Frieman
- Evelyn Hart
- Clara Hughes
- Cindy Klassen
- Donald Russell Pratt
- Len Smith
- Neil Young

=== 2007 ===
- Gail Asper
- Clifford H.C. Edwards
- Ivan Eyre
- Janice Filmon
- Elmer Hildebrand
- John Albert Jack
- Lynn B. Johnston
- Verna J. Kirkness
- June S. Menzies
- Ken Ploen
- Paul G. Thomas
- Ed Wood

=== 2008 ===
- John Bock
- Catherine (Myrtle) deMeulles
- David Glenn Friesen
- David Gislason
- Helen Preston Glass
- Romulo Magsino
- Robert Ronald McLean
- Sophia Rabliauskas
- Hartley Richardson
- Peter Sawatzky
- Evelyn Shapiro
- Muriel Smith

=== 2009 ===
- Abdo (Albert) El Tassi, C.M.
- Yhetta Miriam Gold, C.M.
- Kevin P. Kavanagh, C.M.
- Sylvia Kuzyk
- Philip S. Lee
- Guy Maddin
- Roland Mahé
- Joseph Meconse
- Sylvia Ostry, C.C.
- Frank Plummer, O.C.
- Corrine Scott
- Emőke Szathmáry, C.M.
- Josephine Wright

== 2010s ==
=== 2010 ===
- Norma Bailey
- Marjorie Blankstein, C.M.
- Gary Albert Doer
- David Grewar
- Elijah Harper
- Kerry L. Hawkins
- Betty Hopkins
- Kathryn Knowles
- C. Wilbert (Bert) Loewen
- Carmel Olson
- Robert (Bob) Smith
- Keith Ursel

=== 2011 ===
- Fred Penner
- Jim Carr
- Patrick Choy
- Art DeFehr
- Rayleen De Luca
- Henry Idonije
- Eugene Kostyra
- Raymond Lavallee
- Susan Lewis
- Kathy Mallett
- Raymond Poirier
- Miriam Toews

=== 2012 ===
- Mark Chipman
- Pauline Clarke
- James Coyne
- Darlene Dziewit
- Len Flett
- Étienne Gaboury
- Crystal Kolt
- Art Miki
- Randy Moffat
- Brian Postl
- Bob Silver
- Al Simmons
- Leslie Spillett
- Deborah Thorlakson

=== 2013 ===
- David Chartrand
- Francis Doyle
- Olga Fuga
- Helen Granger Young
- George Nicholas Heshka
- Tse Li Luk
- Diane Redsky
- H. Sanford Riley
- Allan Ronald
- Richard J. Scott
- Ray St. Germain
- Miriam Toews
- Eleanor Woitowicz

=== 2014 ===
- Lorraine Brandson
- Bob Brennan
- Tom Denton
- Don Duguid
- Sam Fabro
- Raymonde Gagne
- Allan Gotlieb
- Israel Idonije
- Bob Irving
- Jennifer Jones
- Hermann Lee
- Roland Penner
- Carole Vivier
- Doris Sarah Young

=== 2015 ===
- Rachel Alao
- Chad Allan
- Karen Beaudin
- Tom Cochrane
- Dian Cohen
- Wilma L. Derksen
- Dan Johnson
- Sheldon Kennedy
- Donald R. J. Mackey
- Mitch Podolak
- Khhem Kamarie (Monica) Singh
- Jonathan Toews

=== 2016 ===
- Paul Albrechtsen
- Marileen Bartlett
- Maria De Nardi
- Dhali Dhaliwal
- Chief Betsy Kennedy
- Gary Kobinger
- Wanda Koop
- Reggie Leach
- Bernadette Smith
- Susan Thompson
- Wanbdi Wakita

=== 2017 ===
- David Angus
- Marlene Bertrand
- Doreen Brownstone
- Selwyn (Sel) Burrows
- Philipp R. Ens
- Anne Lindsey
- Lisa Meeches
- Rey D. Pagtakhan
- Phillip James (Jim) Peebles
- Robert (Bob) Picken
- Paul Robson
- Beverly Suek

=== 2018 ===
- David Barnard
- Michael P. B. Belhumeur
- Jacqueline Blay
- Barbara Bruce
- Sara J. Israels
- Robert T. Kristjanson
- Bill Loewen
- Bernice Marmel
- Robb Nash
- Ken Opaleke
- Grant N. Pierce
- Cheryl Rockman-Greenberg

=== 2019 ===
- Vivian Bruce
- Jason Chuback
- Marcel Desautels
- James Ehnes
- Kathy Hildebrand
- Arvid Loewen
- Clarence Nepinak
- Steven Schipper
- Trudy Schroeder
- Harvey Sector
- Joy Smith
- Michael West

== 2020s ==
=== 2020 ===
- Dr. Stephen Borys — director and CEO of the Winnipeg Art Gallery
- Mitch Bourbonniere
- Mary Courchene
- Dr. Krishnamurti Dakshinamurti — emeritus professor in the University of Manitoba faculty of medicine and senior advisor to the St. Boniface Hospital Research Centre
- Bill Elliott — founding executive director of FortWhyte Alive
- Richard Frost — CEO of The Winnipeg Foundation (TWF)
- Tina Jones — Chair of the Health Sciences Centre (HSC) Foundation board
- Dr. Marion Lewis
- Margaret Morse — Manitoba’s first speech therapist
- Stuart Murray
- Scott Oake — sportscaster for CBC Sports, Sportsnet, and Hockey Night in Canada
- Dr. Ernest Rady

=== 2021 ===
- Steve Bell
- Franklin (Lynn) Bishop
- Ruth Christie
- Dr. Michael Eskin — global leader in canola research and one of the world’s leading food science writers
- Dr. Gordon Goldsborough — president of the Manitoba Historical Society
- Gregg Hanson — former president and CEO of Wawanesa Mutual
- Kyle Irving — co-owner of Eagle Vision
- Ava Kobrinsky — co-founding director of the Winnipeg Folk Festival
- Claudette Leclerc — president and CEO of the Manitoba Museum and Fellow of the Canadian Museum Association
- Doris Mae Oulton — chair of the Nellie McClung Foundation and the Canadian Federation of University Women Charitable Trust
- Greg Selinger — 21st Premier of Manitoba
- Arni Thorsteinson

=== 2022 ===
- Mohamed El Tassi
- Andre Lewis — artistic director and CEO of the Royal Winnipeg Ballet
- Andrew Paterson — president and CEO of Paterson GlobalFoods
- Shirley Richardson
- Desiree Scott — Olympic gold and bronze medallist in soccer
- Darcy Ataman
- James Eldridge
- Doug Harvey
- Leo Ledohowski — owner and executive chair of Canad Inns
- Megumi Masaki
- Alix Jean-Paul
- Marcy Markusa — host of CBC Manitoba’s Information Radio

=== 2023 ===
- Jamie Brown — CEO and executive producer of Frantic Films
- David (Ace) Burpee — radio host on 103.1 Virgin Radio
- John Einarson
- Charles Huband (posthumous)
- Janis Johnson — longest serving Manitoba senator
- Terumi Kuwada
- Dr. Lorrie Kirshenbaum
- Gerry Price
- Alvina Rundle
- Dr. Richard Smith
- Elaine Stevenson
- Amarjeet Warraich — former commissioner on the Manitoba Human Rights Commission

=== 2024 ===
- Elder Mae Louise Campbell
- Hon. Murray Sinclair — former Manitoba senator
- Hon. Myrna Driedger — former Speaker of the Legislative Assembly of Manitoba
- Dr. Brent Roussin
- Dr. Marcia Anderson
- David Johnston
- Robert Paley
- Robert Williams
- Chad Swayze
- Michel D. Lagacé
- James Cohen
- Connie Walker

=== 2025 ===
- Maria Chaput
- Rebecca Gibson
- Gordon Giesbrecht
- Digvir S. Jayas
- Glen Kruck
- Trudy L. Lavallee
- Kenneth Paupanekis
- Kristie Pearson
- Walter John Schroeder
- Charlie Spiring
- Felix C. Walker
- Marion F. Willis

=== 2026 ===
- Tracy Dahl
- Andrew Harris
- Chantal Kreviazuk
- Jocelyne Larocque
- Dr. Peter MacDonald
- Ash Modha
- Brian Pallister
- Dr. Joss Reimer
- Diane Roussin
- Elder Billie Schibler
- Dr. Lotfollah Shafai
- Douglas Stephen
