= EvidenceNetwork.ca =

- Abbreviation: EvidenceNetwork.ca
- Formation: 2011
- Type: Creates original media content on public policy topics for publication in the mainstream media and links journalists with policy experts to provide access to non-partisan, evidence-based information.
- Legal status: active
- Purpose: To provide evidence-based research and experts to journalists covering health policy issues.
- Headquarters: Winnipeg, Manitoba, Canada
- Region served: Canada
- Official language: English
- Lead: Dr. Shannon Sampert (Director and Editor-in-Chief), Kathleen O'Grady, Managing Editor
- Parent organization: University of Winnipeg
- Affiliations: Canadian Institutes for Health Research, Canadian Foundation for Healthcare Improvement, Manitoba Health Research Council, George and Fay Yee Centre for Healthcare Innovation
- Staff: 4
- Website: http://www.evidencenetwork.ca

EvidenceNetwork.ca is a Canadian organization that creates media content on public policy topics for publication in the mainstream media and links journalists with policy experts to provide access to non-partisan, evidence-based information. According to their annual reports, they have published hundreds of original articles in every major media outlet in Canada every year since 2011, reprinted over 3700 times across media outlets All of their content carries a Creative Commons license.

EvidenceNetwork.ca was created under the direction of Dr. Noralou Roos, the Founding Director of the Manitoba Centre for Health Policy and co-founded with Dr. Sharon Manson Singer, professor, School of Public Policy at Simon Fraser University. Dr. Shannon Sampert, former Politics and Opinions Editor at the Winnipeg Free Press and academic at the University of Winnipeg edited the project from 2017-2018. Kathleen O'Grady Research Associate at Concordia University was the Managing Editor from 2011-2019. EvidenceNetwork.ca ceased operations as of the end of 2019 but the content and the site remains online under the direction of Canadian Foundation for Healthcare Improvement until at least 2024.

The initiative was originally funded with a grant from the Canadian Institutes of Health Research (CIHR), the Manitoba Health Research Council (MHRC) and the George and Fay Yee Centre for Healthcare Innovation. Additional support was provided by the Canadian Foundation for Healthcare Improvement (CFHI). It is currently funded by CFHI with support from individual CIHR institutes.

== Background ==
EvidenceNetwork.ca was established to address the complex debates leading up to the 2014 renegotiation of the Canada Health Accord, and after, to highlight evidence on health policy issues across the country. The Director, Dr, Roos, says, "Health policy issues are increasingly complex and are too often taken over by politics and ideology. We thought the best way to serve the Canadian public would be to create an accessible and reliable resource where journalists can quickly find independent experts and evidence on issues as they arise."

The site provides evidence-based information on controversial health policy issues for journalists such as the sustainability of the health care system, the impact of the aging population, the rising costs of drugs, accessibility and appropriateness of care, pharmaceutical policy, obesity, mental health, and the role of the private sector. There is also a section on the comparison between Canadian and international models of healthcare. The site offers background papers and provides a comprehensive list of experts from across the country that journalists can contact quickly as they report on breaking health policy stories.

The British Medical Journal's Evidence-Based Medicine highlighted the work of the network as an example for how to facilitate "the science and art of combining opinion and evidence." University Affairs says of the initiative, "The project aims to break the traditional pattern of academics writing for other academics in journals that aren't read by the mainstream press, or of professors avoiding the media, leaving a select few to appear again and again." J-Source, a professional publication for the Canadian media says of the network, "it's an ambitious initiative to get the latest and best findings in health sciences and policy research into the broader public conversation by engaging the media." In an article for Healthcare Policy, Dr. Roos et al. state that the project "seeks to improve the Canadian healthcare system and, ultimately, the health of Canadians by ensuring that our best health policy evidence is understood by journalists and accurately communicated to Canadians and policy makers."

EvidenceNetwork.ca was established in consultation with experienced media advisors, health and health policy researchers and third party evidence brokers including the Canadian Foundation for Healthcare Improvement, the Canadian Institute for Health Information and the Health Council of Canada.

== Commentaries ==
The network of more than 80 scholars dedicated to evidence-based health research and policy direction also regularly publishes commentaries (OpEds) and articles in the mainstream media. The network has published more than 1200 commentaries and articles in the Canadian press since its inception, and has made all of the articles available for free re-use and dissemination by putting a Creative Commons license on the material. In 2012, the organization published a compendium of their Creative Commons content in an ebook, Canadian Health Policy in the News: Why Evidence Matters. In 2014, they released a second free ebook collection of commentaries, Making Evidence Matter in Canadian Health Policy.

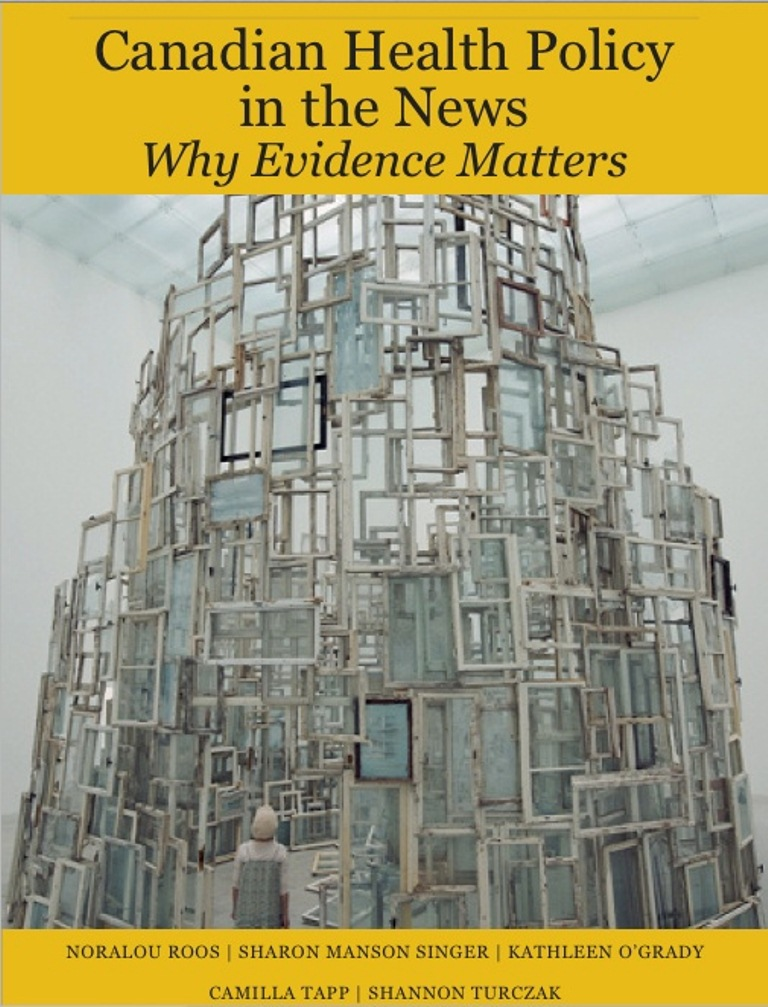
Book cover for the free Creative Commons book (2013) by EvidenceNetwork.ca, available at: http://umanitoba.ca/outreach/evidencenetwork/archives/8941

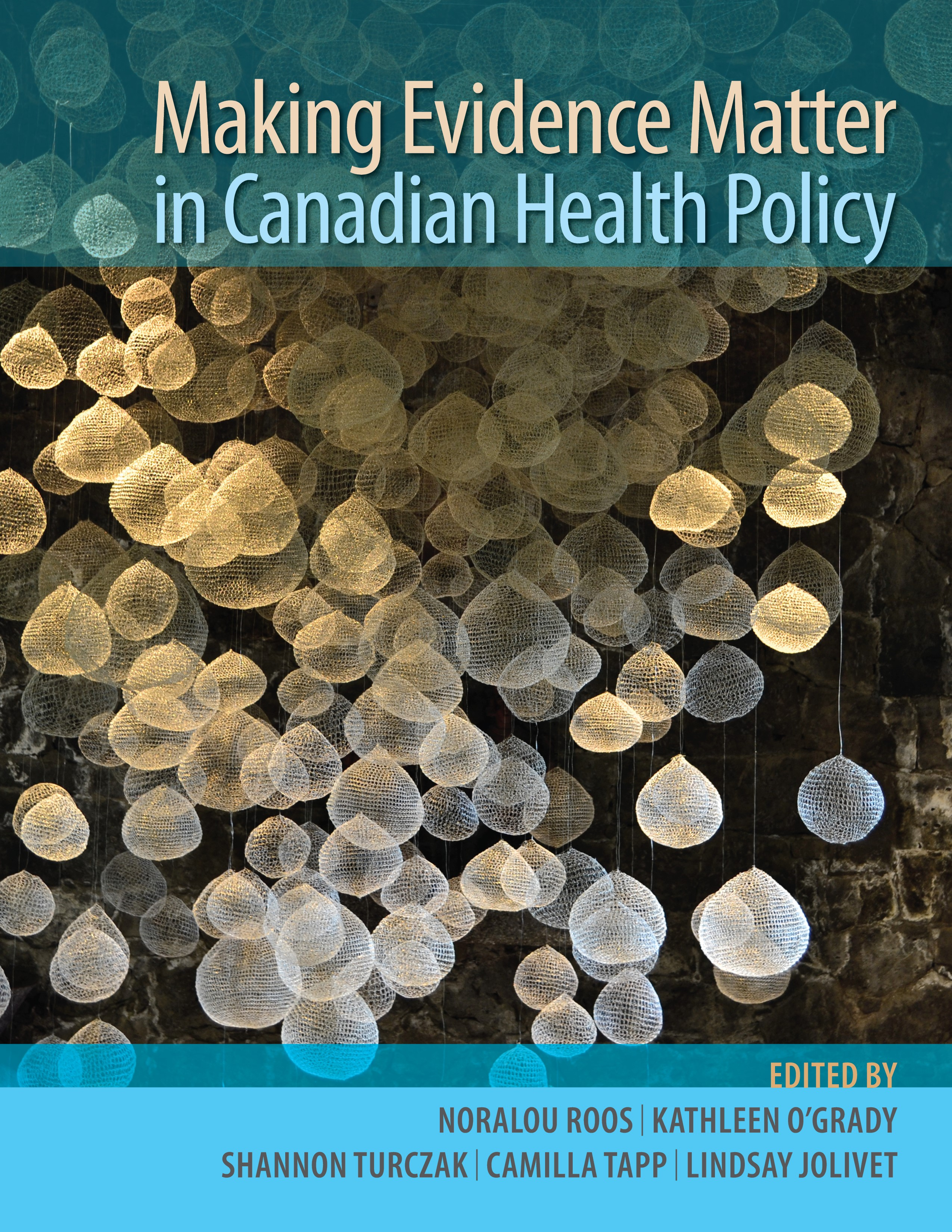
Book Cover for the free Creative Commons book (2014) by EvidenceNetwork.ca, available at: http://umanitoba.ca/outreach/evidencenetwork/archives/17545

A sample of the network's published commentaries includes:

- "Four points about the pending challenge against medicare" by Colleen Flood and Kathleen O'Grady
- "We need to talk about poverty and health" by Carolyn Shimmin
- "Age-friendly communities create a healthier society for everyone" by Verena Menec
- "Social assistance reform can lead to better health for all" by Gary Bloch
- "Patent protection for drugs should come at a price" by Marc-Andre Gagnon
- "More health care does not mean better health" by Robert Brown
- "Childhood hunger is a Canadian public health crisis" by Elizabeth Lee Ford Jones
- "Canada Health Transfer changes: The devil is in the details" by Livio Di Matteo
- "The kids aren't all right" by Elizabeth Lee Ford Jones
- "The case against healthcare user fees" by Raisa Deber and Noralou Roos
- "Seniors are not a threat to health care" by Noralou Roos and Nicholas Hirst
- "What aging tsunami? Why some memes are bad for our health" by Alan Cassels
- "Time for Canada to improve our health care performance" by Colleen Flood
- "Preserving medicare means making changes" by Gregory Marchildon
- "North American fads, fallacies and foolishness in health care reform" by Theodore Marmor
- "Our surprisingly expensive pharmaceuticals" by Marc-Andre Gagnon
- "Why the health system is broken" by Marc-Andre Gagnon
- "How we can save our healthcare system without going broke" by Cy Frank
- "Wrestling with big pharma" by Colleen Flood
- "Prescription painkillers on the rise in Canada" by Ann Silversides
- "Defined benefit versus defined contribution pension plans: Why all the fuss?" by Robert L. Brown
- "Time for Ottawa to change course on health care" by Allan Maslove
- "Expanding CPP easier said than done" by Robert L. Brown

The Director of the initiative, Dr. Noralou Roos has said in an interview, "There are key discussions going on in health policy, and academics typically have that evidence, and it's important for those discussions in the media to be informed by evidence as much as possible."

== See also ==
- Canadian Institutes of Health Research
- Canadian Institute for Health Information
- University of Manitoba
- Health Council of Canada
- Manitoba Health Research Council
- Manitoba Centre for Health Policy
