= Janette Gray =

Australian Sister of Mercy and theologian

Personal life
- Born: 1 February 1952 Adelaide, Australia
- Died: 24 December 2016 (aged 64) Melbourne, Australia

Religious life
- Religion: Roman Catholic
- Order: Sisters of Mercy

Janette Patricia Gray RSM (1952–2016) was an Australian Sister of Mercy who was the first non-Jesuit academic Principal of Jesuit Theological College, Parkville, Melbourne. A fund established in Gray's honour promotes the education and leadership of women in theology and is called the Janette Gray RSM Fund.

== Early life ==
Born 1 February 1952 in Adelaide, South Australia, Gray studied at Macquarie University (Sydney) receiving a BA and Dip.Ed before becoming a sister of Mercy in 1997. She took first vows at the Convent of Mercy (Angas St, Adelaide) in 1977 and final vows in St Francis Xavier Cathedral, Adelaide in 1984. Gray completed a MTheol at the Melbourne College of Divinity and went on to do a PhD in Theology at the University of Cambridge, UK.

== Work ==
Gray's teaching subject areas included Christology, women in the church, faith and culture and the theology of the human person. She was a Senior Lecturer in Theology at the University of Notre Dame Australia, Western Australia 1999-2003, Faculty of Jesuit Theological College, Parkville, Melbourne 2004-2014, Lecturer & Supervisor at the United Faculty of Theology (UFT), Pilgrim College and Yarra Theological Union (YTU) (latterly University of Divinity, Melbourne). For years Gray was a book review editor for Pacifica, recognised as the leading ecumenical journal in Australasia. She was also a member of the National Council of Churches in Australia’s (NCCA) Faith and Unity Commission 2013-2016. At the time of her death, Sr Janette Gray was completing a book on a French Dominican who had proved very influential in preparing for the Second Vatican Council: Theology for Global People: Marie-Dominique Chenu. This dissertation, which was edited by Kathleen Williams, was published posthumously in 2019.

== Feminism ==
Gray's first book, Neither Escaping Nor Exploiting Sex: Women's Celibacy (1995), emerged from her Masters in Theology for the Melbourne College of Divinity. Her supervisors and examiners called for its publication. In the book she explored how celibate women live their sexuality and how their personal challenges yield valuable ideas about human relationships and ecological awareness. The book symbolised a lifelong, passionate concern to educate herself and others.

During her time at Cambridge, Gray, Ann Gilroy, and Kathleen O’Grady resurrected a speaker series called: Women’s Voices in Religion. This series was originally begun in 1990-91 organised by Teresa Elwes resulting in an edited collection published in 1992. In turn, they published an edited collection “Bodies, Lives, Voices: Gender in Theology” and the series continued under Carrie Pemberton 1997-98.

== Other work ==
Gerald O'Collins includes Gray in his book “Portraits: Popes, Family, and Friends” along with Mother Teresa of Calcutta and Cardinal Carlo Maria Martin.

== Publications ==
- Gray, J. (2019). M-D Chenu's Christian anthropology: nature and grace in society and church. Hindmarsh. ISBN 978-1-925872-65-1. OCLC 1101278152
- Gray, J. (1995) Neither escaping nor exploiting sex: women's celibacy. Slough St Pauls. (5 Citations) ISBN 1875570586
- Bodies, lives, voices: gender in theology. Ann L. Gilroy, Janette Gray, Kathleen A. O'Grady. Sheffield: Sheffield Academic. 1998. ISBN 1-85075-854-9.
- Gray, J. (2016) "Campaigning to Ban Landmines: A Theologian Reflection, p.122-127. Chapter in A path is made by walking it: reflections on the Australian network to ban landmines, 1991-2006. Patricia Pak-Poy, ICBL Australian Network to Ban Landmines. East Kew, Vic.: David Lovell Publishing in conjunction with ICBL Australian Network to Ban Landmines.
