= Emőke Szathmáry =

Canadian academic and university administrator

Emőke Jolán Erzsébet Szathmáry
- Born: January 25, 1944 (age 82); Hungary
- Citizenship: Hungary; Canada
- Education: University of Toronto, BA anthrop 1968, PhD anthrop 1974
- Known for: genetics of the indigenous peoples of North America, focusing on the causes of type-2 diabetes, the genetic relationships within and between North American and Asian peoples, and the microevolution of subarctic and arctic populations. Her field research involved Ottawa, Ojibwa and Dogrib peoples in Ontario and the Northwest Territories.
- Spouse: Dr George A Reilly (m. 1974)
- Awards: LL.D.: Univ Toronto, 2001, York Univ, 2008 & McMaster Univ, 2008; D.Sc.(h.c.), Univ Western Ont, 2003; D.Litt. S, Univ St Michael's Coll, 2004; Franz Boas Distinguished Achievement Award, Hum Biol Assoc, 2007; Canada's Most Powerful Women: Top 100, Women's Executive Network, 2004; Order of Canada, Canada, 2003; Distinguished Lecturer, Amer Anthropol Assoc, 1998; Fellow of the AAAS, 1995; Fellow of the Arctic Institute of North America, 1989
- Scientific career
- Fields: physical anthropology human genetics
- Workplaces: Professor, Dept Med Genetics and Biochem, Univ Man, Winnipeg, 1996- Prof, Dept Antrop, Univ Man, Winnipeg, 1996- Pres & Vice Chancellor, Univ Man, Winnipeg, 1996–2008 prof biology, McMaster Univ, Hamilton, 1994–1996 prof antrop, McMaster Univ, Hamilton, 1994–1996 provost & vpres, McMaster Univ, Hamilton, 1994–1996 hon prof, Dept Zool, Univ Western Ont, London, 1989–1994 prof, Dept Antrop, Univ Western Ont, London, 1989–1994 dean, Fac Social Sci, Univ Western Ont, London, 1989–1994 assoc mem, Dept Biol, McMaster Univ, Hamilton, 1985–1988 chmn, Dept Antrop, McMaster Univ, Hamilton, 1985–1988 prof antrop, McMaster Univ, Hamilton, 1983–1988 assoc prof antrop, McMaster Univ, Hamilton, 1978–1983 asst prof antrop, McMaster Univ, Hamilton, 1975–1978 asst prof antrop, Univ Trent, Peterborough, 1974–1975 chair, Council Western Canada University Press 2007–2008 co-chmn, Adv Comm Diabetes, Man Min Health 2000–2003 exec Comm & bd Assoc Univ & Colls Canada 2000-200 JW Dafoe Found 1996–2008; Assoc Univ & Coll Canada 2007–2008; Manitoba Museum Found 1997–2006; Can Genet Dis Netwrk, 2003–2007; Prime Min Adv Com Sci & Tech 2005–2007; Ed-in-Chief Am J Physl Anthropol 1995–2001; Ybk Physl Anthropol 1987–1991 exec Comm Am Assoc Physl Anthropol 1987–1991, 1995–2001; Hum Biol Council, 1985–1989 pres Hum Biol Council, 1990- 1992; Can Assoc Physl Anthropol 1975–1979

Emőke J.E. Szathmáry, CM OM FRSC (born January 25, 1944, in Hungary) is a physical anthropologist, specializing in the study of human genetics. Dr. Szathmáry served as the 10th President and Vice-Chancellor of The University of Manitoba, 1996–2008.

Dr. Szathmáry's first administrative post was as chairman of the department of anthropology at McMaster University, a position she left to become Dean of the Faculty of Social Science at the University of Western Ontario. She left this position to serve as provost and vice-president (academic) at McMaster University in Hamilton, Ontario, before going to her position at the University of Manitoba. Szathmáry was appointed a member of the Order of Canada in 2003. In 2004, she was named one of Canada's top 100 most powerful women by the Women's Executive Network and the Richard Ivey School of Business. In 2005, she was made a Fellow of the Royal Society of Canada. She was named also as a Distinguished Lecturer by the American Anthropological Association, which is the highest recognition given by the anthropological discipline for a lifetime of exemplary scholarship.

== Publications (partial list) ==
- Prehistoric Mongoloid Dispersals, Takeru Akazawa (Editor), Emoke J. E. Szathmáry (Editor)
- Out of Asia: peopling the Americas and the Pacific, Journal of Pacific History, 1985, Robert Kirk, Emöke J. E. Szathmary, editors
- Szathmáry, Emőke J. E. (1993). "INVITED EDITORIAL – mtDNA and the Peopling of the Americas". Am. J. Hum. Genet. 53 (4): 793–799. PMC 1682381. PMID 7692724.
- Szathmáry (1981). "Genetic markers in Siberian and northern North American populations". Yearbook of Physical Anthropology. 24: 37–73. doi:10.1002/ajpa.1330240503.
- Szathmáry (1984). "Human biology of the arctic". Handbook of North American Indians: 64–71.
- Szathmáry, Emőke (1979). "Blood groups of Siberians, Eskimos, and subarctic and northwest coast indians: the problem of first origins and genetic relations". The First Americans: Origins, Affinities, and Adaptations.
- Szathmáry, Emöke J.E. (2011). "David Damas (1926–2010)". Arctic. 64 (1). Arctic Institute of North America: 125. doi:10.14430/arctic4091. (obituary)
- Szathmáry, Emőke J. E. (22 October 2006). "Address to the Commemoration in Winnipeg of the 50th Anniversary of the Hungarian Uprising". Canada-Hungary Educational Foundation / Fondation éducative Canada-Hongrie (CHEF). Archived from the original on 2011-10-03.
- Little, Michael A.; Kennedy, Kenneth A. R. (eds.). Histories of American Physical Anthropology in the Twentieth Century. contributor
- Szathmary, J.E. (1986). "Diabetes in arctic and subarctic populations undergoing acculturation". Collegium Antropologium. 10: 145–158.
- Szathmary, J.E. (1990). "Diabetes in Amerindian populations: The Dogrib studies". In Swedlund, A.C.; Armelagos, G.J. (eds.). Disease in populations in transition. New York: Bergin & Garvey. pp. 75–103.
- Szathmary, J.E. (1994). "Non-insulin dependent diabetes mellitus among aboriginal North Americans". Annual Review of Anthropology. 23: 457–482. doi:10.1146/annurev.anthro.23.1.457.
- Szathmary, J.E. (1994). "Factors that influence the onset of diabetes in Dogrib Indians of the Canadian Northwest Territories". In Joe, J.R.; Young, R.S. (eds.). Diabetes as a disease of civilization. Berlin: Moutoun de Gruyter. pp. 229–267.

== Directorships (partial) ==
- International Institute for Sustainable Development
- Power Corporation of Canada, since 1999, Director, Member of Audit Committee and Member of Related Party & Conduct Review Committee
- Power Financial, since 1999
- Great-West Lifeco since 2006
- Can Credit Manag Found 2001-
- Univ Arctic 2007-
- St Boniface Gen Hosp, Manitoba 1996–2008
- Advanced Foods and Materials Network
- Canada Life Financial Corporation
- Great-West Life Capital Trust
- The Canada Life Assurance Company

Academic offices
Preceded by Arnold Naimark	President of the University of Manitoba; 1996-2008	Succeeded by David Barnard
