= Swedlund =

Swedlund is a Swedish surname. Notable people with the surname include:

- Alan C. Swedlund (born 1943), American anthropologist and academic
- Nils Swedlund (1898–1965), General and Supreme Commander of the Swedish Armed Forces, uncle of Sten (see below)
- Sten Swedlund (1937–2014), Rear Admiral and Chief of the Coastal Fleet, nephew of Nils (see above)
