= Canada–Iceland relations =

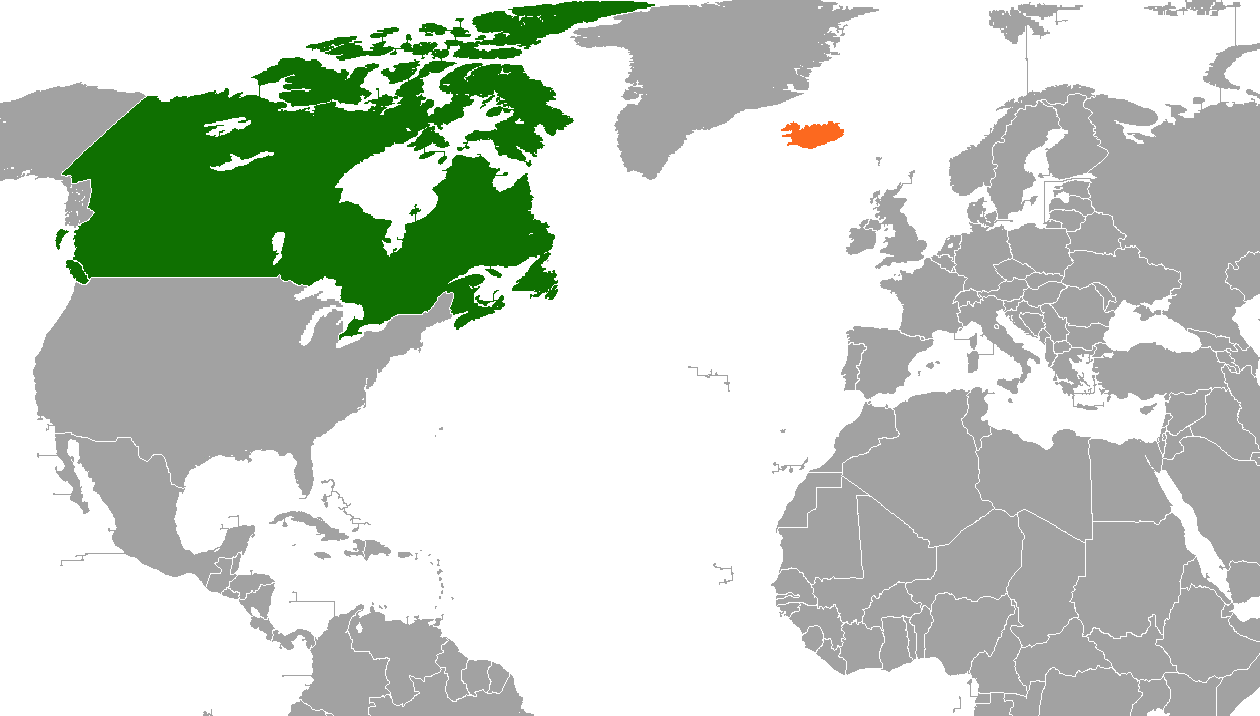

- Canada: Iceland

Canada and Iceland have longstanding foreign relations. Contact goes back over a thousand years, but formal diplomatic relations began in 1947. Both nations are members of the Arctic Council, NATO, OECD, and WTO. Additionally, Canada holds observer status in the Barents Euro-Arctic Council.

== History ==
Relations between Iceland and present-day Canada began over one thousand years ago when Icelander Leif Erikson landed in L'Anse aux Meadows in Newfoundland to establish a colony. However, the colony did not last long, and much of the fate of the migrants is unknown. The first permanent migrants from Iceland arrived in Canada in 1874 to work on the rail lines at Kinmount, Ontario. Between 1870 and 1914, thousands of Icelanders migrated to North America, with most moving to Canada.

In 1940, during World War II, Canadian troops were based in Iceland, along with troops from the United Kingdom and the United States to counter German advances in the north Atlantic. Canadian Prime Minister William Mackenzie King said this action was made by the Canadian Government at the request of the Government of the United Kingdom. Canadian Prime Minister Mackenzie King announced on 18 June 1940 that the first contingent of the Canadian Expeditionary Force had landed in Iceland. In 1942, Iceland opened a consulate in Winnipeg. Soon after the war, in 1947, both nations officially established diplomatic relations.

In 1948, Iceland appointed an ambassador to Canada with residence in Washington, D.C. In 1949, Canada appointed a non-resident ambassador to Iceland based in Oslo, Norway. In May 2001, Iceland established an embassy in the Canadian capital of Ottawa and Canada followed suit by opening an embassy in Reykjavík.

== High-level visits ==
Prime Ministerial visits from Canada to Iceland

- Prime Minister Pierre Trudeau (1981)
- Prime Minister Justin Trudeau (2023)

Prime Ministerial and Presidential visits from Iceland to Canada

- President Ásgeir Ásgeirsson (1961, 1967)
- Prime Minister Bjarni Benediktsson (1964)
- President Kristján Eldjárn (1975)
- President Ólafur Ragnar Grímsson (1991)
- Prime Minister Davíð Oddsson (2000)
- Prime Minister Halldór Ásgrímsson (2005)
- Prime Minister Geir Haarde (2007, 2008)
- Prime Minister Sigmundur Davíð Gunnlaugsson (2013, 2014)
- President Guðni Th. Jóhannesson (2023)

== Cultural relations ==
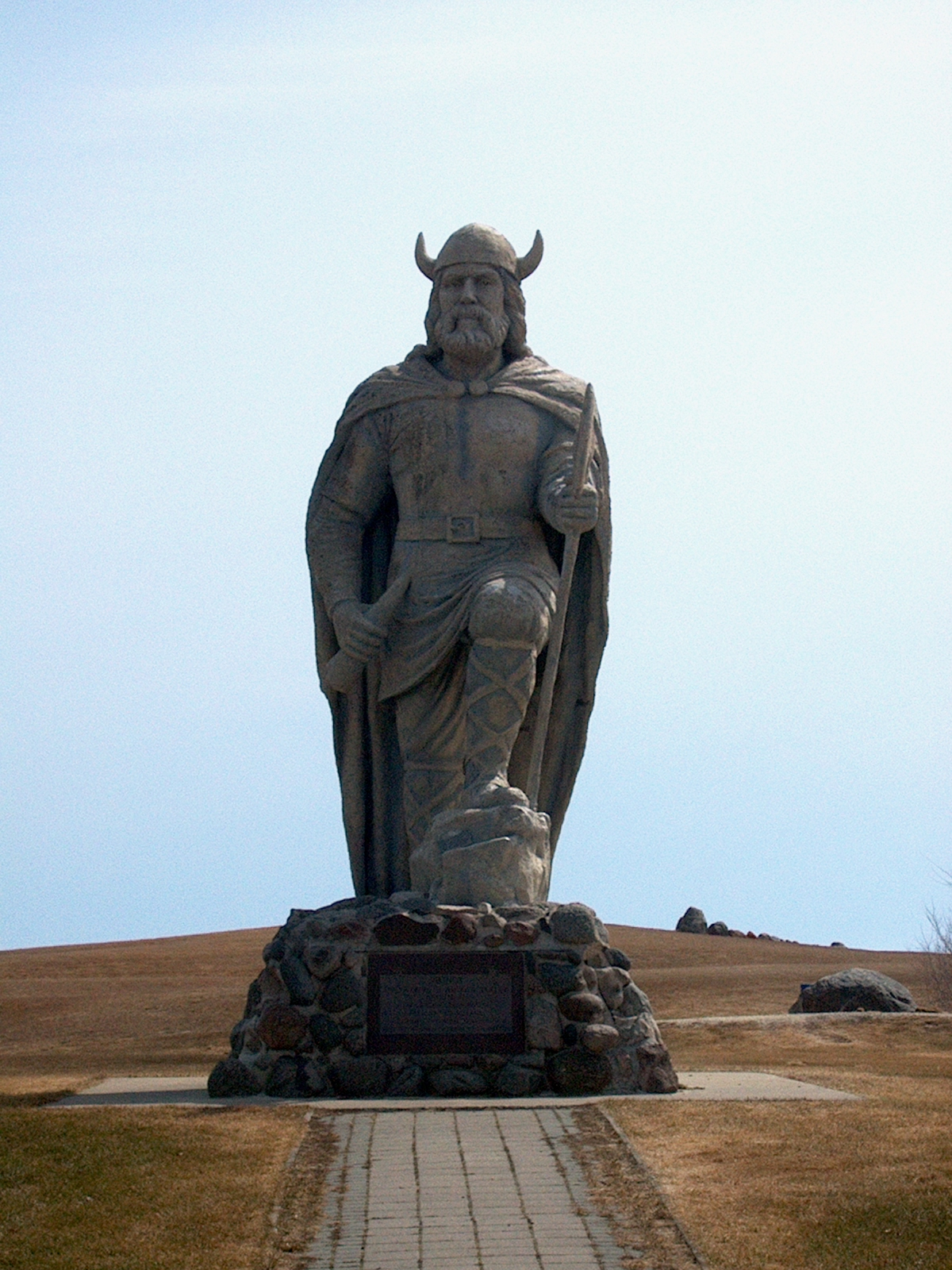
Viking statue in Gimli, Manitoba.

Minister of Labour Immigration in Manitoba, Nancy Allan, said "No country in the world is closer connected to Manitoba than Iceland".

There is a community of Icelandic descent concentrated mainly in Gimli, Manitoba. In 2008 in Canada, 88,875 people have some ethnic Icelandic background, 30,550 of them in Manitoba. This equates to about a third of Iceland's current population.

In 1999, Halldór Ásgrímsson, Icelandic Minister for Foreign Affairs and External Trade said:

Iceland and Canada have shared close and friendly ties for a long time. A large proportion of the Icelandic population migrated to Canada during the latter part of last century and the early part this century. Today, we find by far the largest population outside Iceland, in Canada.

Neil Bardal was an active member of the Icelandic community in Manitoba and served as a former honorary consul general of Iceland, past president of the Icelandic National League of North America and director of the Canada Iceland Foundation. In 2006, he was the recipient of the Order of Manitoba for his leadership work in the Icelandic community. In 2000, Bardal was awarded the Knight's Cross of the Icelandic Order of the Falcon, the highest honour bestowed by the Icelandic government. Former United States Consul to Winnipeg, Mary Speer, described Bardal as a "tireless advocate for strong Canadian-Icelandic relations."

Another descendant of Canada's Icelandic community, Janis Gudrun Johnson was appointed to the Senate of Canada in 1990 by then-Prime Minister of Canada Brian Mulroney. Throughout her time in the Senate, Johnson has been a strong proponent of close Canada–Iceland relations and cultural ties. From November 28–29, 2014, Johnson accompanied Canadian Minister of Foreign Affairs John Baird on a bilateral visit to Reykjavik to discuss a variety of bilateral issues including responsible resource development, expanding the European Free Trade Association free-trade relationship, international security issues and the objectives of the Arctic Economic Council.

== Economic relations ==
In 1975, the Icelandic Government urged Canada to establish a 200-mile offshore fishing limit to protect itself from overfishing by foreign fleets. The Foreign Minister of Iceland, Einar Aguisson, said "we sincerely hope Canada will establish an offshore limit of 200 miles". The Icelandic President Kristján Eldjárn said during a tour of Canada that "Iceland can't wait any longer because of depleted fish stocks and if Canada joins us we will then have an important ally."

In 1998, the two countries signed a trade and economic cooperation agreement. In 2007, Canada signed a free trade agreement with the European Free Trade Association which includes Iceland. This agreement came into force July 1, 2009.

Under this trade agreement, Canadian exports to Iceland such as industrial products received tariff reductions. This included prefabricated buildings, cathode ray tubes, steel structures, aluminum structures, and doors and windows. Tariffs on Canadian frozen french fries exported to Iceland will be reduced by about 40 per cent.

In 2008, Canada was Iceland's 20th largest trade partner with the top Icelandic export sectors being fish, crustaceans, molluscs (C$11.1m), chemicals (C$4.1m) and machinery (C$3.7m).

In February 2009, the Government of Manitoba proposed an initiative where skilled, unemployed workers from Iceland would work to fill vacancies in Manitoba to help Icelanders affected by the 2008–2012 Icelandic financial crisis. The Manitoba and Icelandic governments signed off on the initiative in 2009. However, the process was delayed by the federal government's rules around the Temporary Foreign Worker Program. This frustrated the Icelandic Government. A representative of the Icelandic government's Directorate of Labour said "It has moved slower than I expected, and that's bad, not the least for those who are unemployed, because time doesn't work for them."

In late 2010, the opposition party in Iceland suggested that the country should scrap its currency in favour of switching to a new currency after the very serious banking collapse in 2008. Seven out of ten Icelanders surveyed agreed with changing to a new currency if it meant more economic prosperity. The favoured currency of choice was the Canadian dollar due to the closeness of cultural customs between Canada and Iceland. Neither governments would comment and a speech by Canada's ambassador to Iceland was cancelled in March 2012, when the matter became more prevalent.

== Disputes ==
In early 2010, the government of Iceland protested its exclusion by the government of Canada from a meeting on Arctic sovereignty attended by ministers from, in addition to Canada, Denmark, Norway, Russia and the United States.

Canada’s then Minister of Foreign Affairs, Lawrence Cannon, defended his decision not to include fellow Arctic Council members Finland, Iceland and Sweden, on the grounds that the meeting was exclusive to members of the Arctic five.

== Transport links ==
=== Sea ===
Iceland has had direct shipping connections with the Canadian province of Newfoundland across the North Atlantic Ocean. The fishing banks off the shore of Newfoundland were frequent destinations for the Icelandic trawlers.

Shipping line Maersk Line offers a container service from Montreal to Reykjavík and also a service from Vancouver to Reykjavík. Eimskip, an Icelandic company, operates between Argentia, Newfoundland and Halifax, Nova Scotia to Reykjavík.

=== Air ===
In 2007, the Canadian Transport Ministry announced an Open Skies agreement with Iceland, under the Government of Canada's Blue Sky policy. Canadian Minister of International Trade David Emerson said "This Blue Sky agreement will complement the recent free trade agreement signed with Iceland and other countries of the European Free Trade Association, and will help facilitate stronger business ties and enhance tourism between Canada and Iceland".

There are direct air links between the two countries. In May 2007, Icelandair commenced flights between Halifax and Iceland. In August 2007, Icelandair announced they intended to start flights between Toronto and Iceland. Flights started in May 2009 between Reykjavík and both Toronto and Halifax.

Starting in March 2013, Icelandair upgraded its seasonal service from Toronto to Reykjavík to year-round. It also launched year-round service from Edmonton starting from March 2014.

== Resident diplomatic missions ==
- Canada has an embassy in Reykjavík.
- Iceland has an embassy in Ottawa and a consulate-general in Winnipeg.

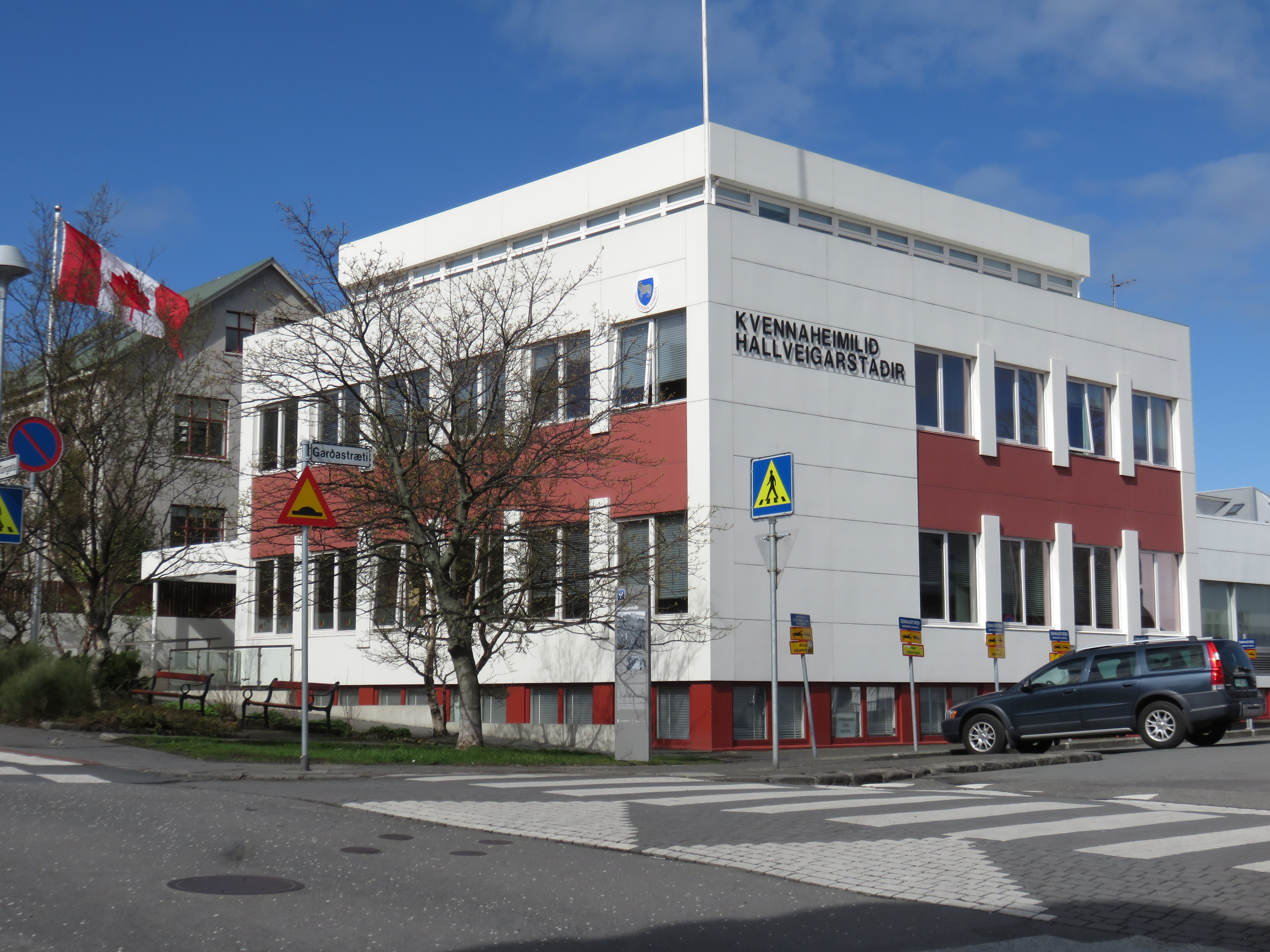
Embassy of Canada in Reykjavík

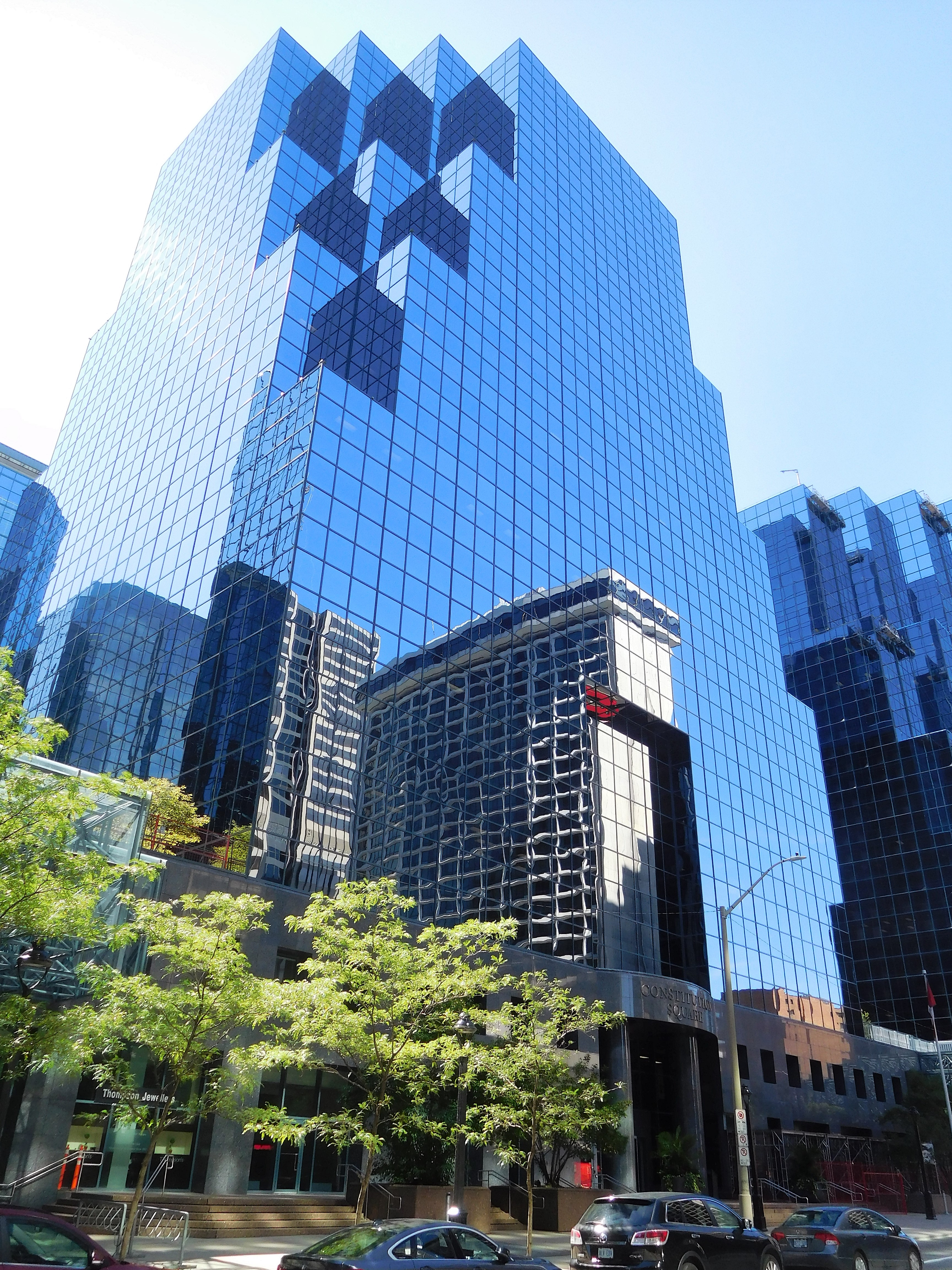
Building hosting the Embassy of Iceland in Ottawa

== See also ==
- Foreign relations of Canada
- Foreign relations of Iceland
- Ambassador of Iceland to Canada
- Icelandic Canadians
- New Iceland
- Viking Age
