= Manitoba Health Research Council =

Canadian provincial agency

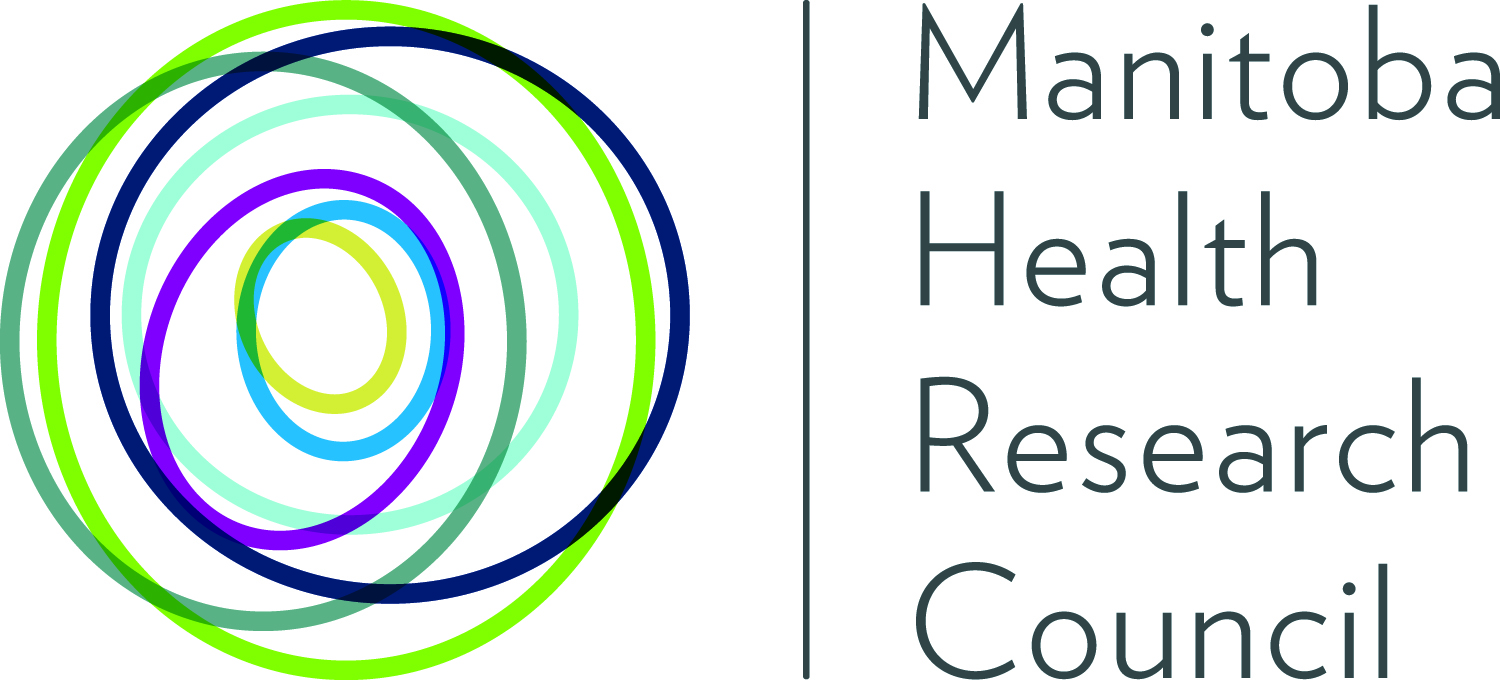
- Abbreviation: MHRC
- Formation: 1982–2014
- Type: Provincial agency under the Ministry of Jobs and the Economy
- Legal status: inactive; dissolved into Research Manitoba in 2014.
- Purpose: Promote and support health sciences research in Manitoba via grants, awards and fellowships funded by the provincial government
- Headquarters: Winnipeg, Manitoba, Canada
- Location: 205-445 Ellice Avenue, Winnipeg, MB Canada R3B 3P5
- Region served: Manitoba
- Official language: English
- Executive Director: Christina Weise, Executive Director; Dr. Brian Postl, Council Chair
- Staff: 7
- Website: http://www.mhrc.mb.ca

The Manitoba Health Research Council (MHRC), was a provincial agency based in Winnipeg, Manitoba, Canada, that supported health sciences research through grants, awards and fellowships funded by Manitoba's provincial government. The MHRC reported to and advised the Ministry of Innovation, Energy and Mines.

MHRC was folded into Research Manitoba in 2014 with a renewed focus and mandate.

== History ==
The MHRC was created from the idea of three local scientists. Dr. Arnold Naimark, Dr. Henry Friesen and Dr. Lyonel Israels began discussions with the Manitoba provincial government in 1980, expressing their concern about the lack of provincial funding for scientific investigation. Several other provinces had allocated funding to health research by this time, including Quebec, Ontario, Saskatchewan and Alberta, and the doctors told the Minister of Health that Manitoba needed a competitive edge to both recruit and retain scientists in the province.

The Ministry of Health agreed, and the MHRC was born. The initial funding topped $300,000, and by April 1981, the MHRC awarded its first grants to scientists in disciplines that included medicine, engineering, psychology and nursing. However, it was not until 1982 that the MHRC was officially established after the Manitoba Health Research Council Act was passed by the Legislative Assembly of Manitoba.

Since the 1980s, the size and the scope of the MHRC has expanded dramatically. According to Research Media, MHRC more than doubled the number of funded applications between the period 2005 to 2011. Most recently, funding for the MHRC topped $6 million, a sum dedicated to grants, fellowships, awards and other research programs. In total, since its inception 31 years ago, the MHRC has supported more than 1,300 health researchers with their projects.

Initially the organization reported to the Ministry of Health, but in 2002, with the creation of the Department of Science, Technology, Energy and Mines—now named Innovation, Energy and Mines—the MHRC received its funding and coordinated its research portfolio with this newly created ministry. Presently, the organization is under the direction of the Ministry of Jobs and the Economy.

The current Executive Director of MHRC is Christina Weise. Dr. Brian Postl is the Chair of the Council, which is composed of 14 government-appointed members.

== Mission ==
The MHRC's mission is to support, coordinate and connect the health research community in the province through its funding programs, as well as to advise the Ministry of Innovation, Energy and Mines on key policy issues.

In the fall of 2005, the Government of Manitoba asked MHRC to lead a provincial strategy for health research in consultation with the community, which included the Creating our Future Summit. More than 140 people attended the conference in May 2006, spanning the health disciplines and including academics, business, non-profit organizations, front line workers and government.

The Envisioning the Future strategic plan which resulted identified the MHRC as the coordinating body for health research in the province, and emphasized the need to recruit, retain and support the best faculty in the health sciences. It further reinforced the need to ensure robust research networks, and communication between disciplines and stakeholders. Notably, it emphasized the need for MHRC to help stakeholders "move research evidence into practice."

Along with the strategic plan came stable, increased funding, and a clear mandate to promote the growth of health research in the province.

== Programs and fellowships ==
The MHRC offers a wide range of high-profile grants and awards to both emerging and established health sciences researchers in the province.

Since its inception in the 1980s, MHRC has offered operating grants and trainee awards, as well as postdoctoral fellowships, graduate studentships and PhD Dissertation Awards to encourage budding researchers.

More recently, MHRC has added funding for 10 or more Manitoba Research Chairs to recruit and retain established researchers with international recognition in their field. MHRC has also developed a number of programs and partnerships for clinical scientists, including professorships, Clinical Fellowships and funding for MD and PhD programs.

Bridge Funding was established by MHRC to offer support to researchers whose funding has been cut or has ended from other agencies, and is intended for a research project that is already in progress. MHRC has also created a fund to support building capacity in health services research, in partnership with the Canadian Institutes of Health Research.

The organization's funded work in recent years has included a wide variety of projects, including grant funding to EvidenceNetwork.ca, as well as studies on human thyroid carcinoma, mental health in Canadian soldiers, suicide among First Nations communities and relationships between patients and family caregivers.

At stakeholder request, the organization has also supported clinical research into the controversial liberation therapy treatment for multiple sclerosis in conjunction with the Saskatchewan Health Research Foundation. Both organizations are members of the National Alliance of Provincial Health Research Organizations, a collaboration of agencies that meets to share ideas and work together on projects.

Most recently, an MHRC-funded study published in 2013 found that patients who leave the hospital against doctors' advice are significantly more likely to be readmitted or die within the following six months than those who follow clinical instruction and remain in hospital until discharge.

== Select partner organizations ==
- The Manitoba Institute of Child Health
- Innovation, Energy and Mines, Province of Manitoba
- CancerCare Manitoba
- Faculty of Science, The University of Winnipeg
- Health Sciences Centre, Winnipeg
- Hôpital St-Boniface Hospital
- Life Science Association of Manitoba
- School of Health Studies, Brandon University
- University of Manitoba
- Winnipeg Regional Health Authority

== See also ==
- Canadian Institutes of Health Research
- Canadian Institutes of Health Research
- Health Council of Canada
- EvidenceNetwork.ca
- Manitoba Centre for Health Policy
