= Maureen O'Neil =

Maureen O'Neil OC
- Education: Carleton University

Maureen O'Neil OC was made an Officer of the Order of Canada in 2011 in recognition for "her contributions to international development, gender equality and human rights". She is the President of the Canadian Foundation for Healthcare Improvement. She has previously served as President of the International Development Research Centre, President of the North-South Institute, and Ontario Deputy Minister of Citizenship.

O'Neil served as the Canadian representative on the UN Commission on the Status of Women, coordinator for Status of Women Canada, and was the deputy head of delegation to the 1985 World Conference on Women.
