= Canadian Foundation for Healthcare Improvement =

Canadian non-profit organization

Canadian Foundation for Healthcare Improvement Fondation canadienne pour l’amélioration des services de santé
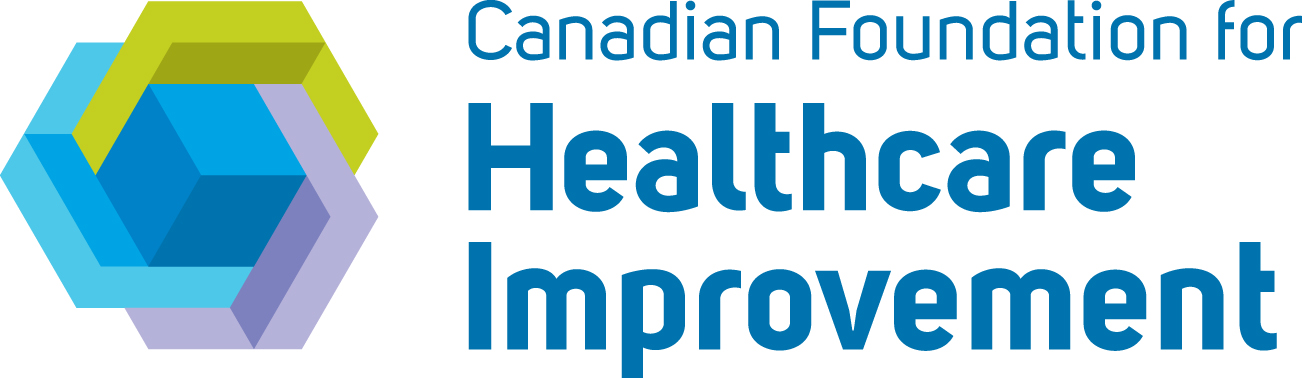
- Abbreviation: CFHI
- Formation: 1996 (formerly known as Canadian Health Services Research Foundation, CHSRF)
- Type: Non-profit, health policy, Canadian registered charity
- Legal status: active
- Purpose: The improvement and transformation of healthcare in Canada via policies, programs, research and leadership development.
- Headquarters: Ottawa, Ontario, Canada
- Location: 150 Kent Street, Suite 200, Ottawa, Ontario K1P 0E4 Canada
- Region served: Canada
- Official language: English, French
- President: Jennifer Zelmer
- Board chair: Lynn Stevenson
- Staff: 80
- Website: Official website

The Canadian Foundation for Healthcare Improvement (CFHI; French: Fondation canadienne pour l’amélioration des services de santé) is a non-profit and non-partisan organization based in Ottawa, Ontario, Canada that collaborates with governments, policy makers, researchers, front-line clinicians, patients and practice leaders, as well as non-profit and professional organizations to accelerate healthcare improvements and transform Canada's healthcare systems.

== History ==
CFHI was founded in 1996 with an endowment from the Canadian federal government. Originally called the Canadian Health Services Research Foundation (CHSRF) (the name changed in 2012), the organization was created to support evidence-informed decision-making in the organization, management and delivery of health services through funding research, building capacity and transferring knowledge. Programs such as Executive Training for Research Application (EXTRA) were developed and, over time, the Foundation began to evolve from an emphasis on building applied health services research to supporting the adoption of innovative practices across Canadian healthcare systems.

The current President of CFHI is Maureen O'Neil, O.C., who has held the position since 2008; Dr. Lynn Stevenson, Associate Deputy Minister of Health in the B.C. Ministry of Health, is the chair of the board of directors. O'Neil is also Chair of the Advisory Council on Corporate Social Responsibility of Canada's Export Development Corporation, and a member of the Board for eHealth Ontario.

CFHI collaborates closely with Health Canada and many provincial and territorial health authorities across the country. They also support the improvement efforts of large regional agencies, such as hospitals, clinics, and community care facilities in neighbourhoods throughout Canada to accelerate healthcare improvement. Evaluation and performance management is embedded into all collaborations as part of the CFHI mandate to make sure all programs are efficient, responsive and productive.

Since 2007, CFHI has hosted an annual conference, "CEO Forum," a one-day event that brings together CEOs, senior leaders, deputy ministers and prominent experts to share their knowledge, perspective and experience on key issues in healthcare policy and management. Its 2013 CEO Forum in Montreal with Ipsos Public Affairs was entitled, "Patient and Family-centred Care and Efficiency: Complementary Aims?" which focused on the point of care delivery.

== Programs ==
CFHI has established a Patient Engagement program which involves senior healthcare administrators and policy-makers from across Canada, along with patients, families and caregivers, working together to improve the design, delivery and evaluation of health services, so that these services might centre on the needs of patients and families.

The organization launched the Atlantic Healthcare Collaboration for Innovation and Improvement in Chronic Disease in 2012, a patient-centred approach to manage chronic diseases in Atlantic Canada. This program involves regional health authorities working together across four provinces to develop cost-effective approaches to manage chronic diseases, with the needs of patients and their families at the forefront. The CEO of Capital District Health Authority in Nova Scotia, which participates in the effort, called it "one of the most important healthcare collaborations ever to take root" in the region.

The organization has also partnered with the Department of Health and Social Services in the Northwest Territories to create an approach to manage chronic diseases, with a focus on diabetes, renal disease and mental illness, that is integrated, territory-wide and culturally appropriate.

== Fellowships and training ==
CFHI's flagship fourteen month leadership development program is the Executive Training for Healthcare Improvement program. Groups of health professionals working in senior management positions, including doctors and nurses in executive positions, can apply for the fellowship, which offers training in implementation of research evidence and skills development to improve their organizations. EXTRA is supported by a number of partnering organizations, including the Canadian Nurses Association and the Canadian Medical Association.

In conjunction with the Commonwealth Fund, CFHI provides funding for a Canadian to participate in the Harkness Fellowship Award with colleagues from other countries. The award is geared to mid-career researchers, policy makers, journalists and others to spend a year conducting a research study on a health policy topic in the United States in consultation with a mentor who is an expert in the field.

The Naimark Fellow Award is named after Arnold Naimark, and is awarded annually to health services leaders who demonstrate professional excellence and outstanding achievement in healthcare improvement. CFHI's annual Excellence Through Evidence Award recognizes a health services leader who has successfully implemented evidence-informed innovations in care and service delivery.

OnCall is CFHI's regular webinar series which has run for more than six years, and focuses on health systems transformation, patient and citizen engagement, population needs and mental health.

== Select publications ==
- An Innovative Strategy in Organizational Transformation: Creating and Implementing a Transition Support Office Within a University Health Centre
- Knowledge in Action: Healthcare Management and Governance Innovation Lab
- Accelerating Healthcare Improvement in Canada: A Review of Policy Options to Sustain, Improve and Transform Healthcare
- Funding Health and Social Care in Montréal, Québec: A Review of the Methods and the Potential Role of Incentives
- Reviewing the Potential Roles of Financial Incentives for Funding Healthcare in Canada
- Strengthening Primary Health Care Through Primary Care and Public Collaboration
- A Comparative Study of Three Transformative Healthcare Systems: Lessons for Canada
- On-going Mythbusters series challenging widely held beliefs about the Canadian healthcare system with current evidence, translated into multiple languages

== Select partner organizations ==
- Canadian Nurses Association
- Canadian Medical Association
- Canadian College of Health Leaders
- Northwest Health and Social Services
- Northshore Tribal Council
- EvidenceNetwork.ca
- Capital Health
- Institut national de santé publique du Québec
- Canadian Patient Safety Institute

== See also ==
- Canadian Partnership Against Cancer
- Commonwealth Fund
- Health Canada
- Canadian Feed the Children
