= St Aloysius College, Adelaide =

Coordinates: 34°55′43″S 138°36′12″E

St Aloysius College
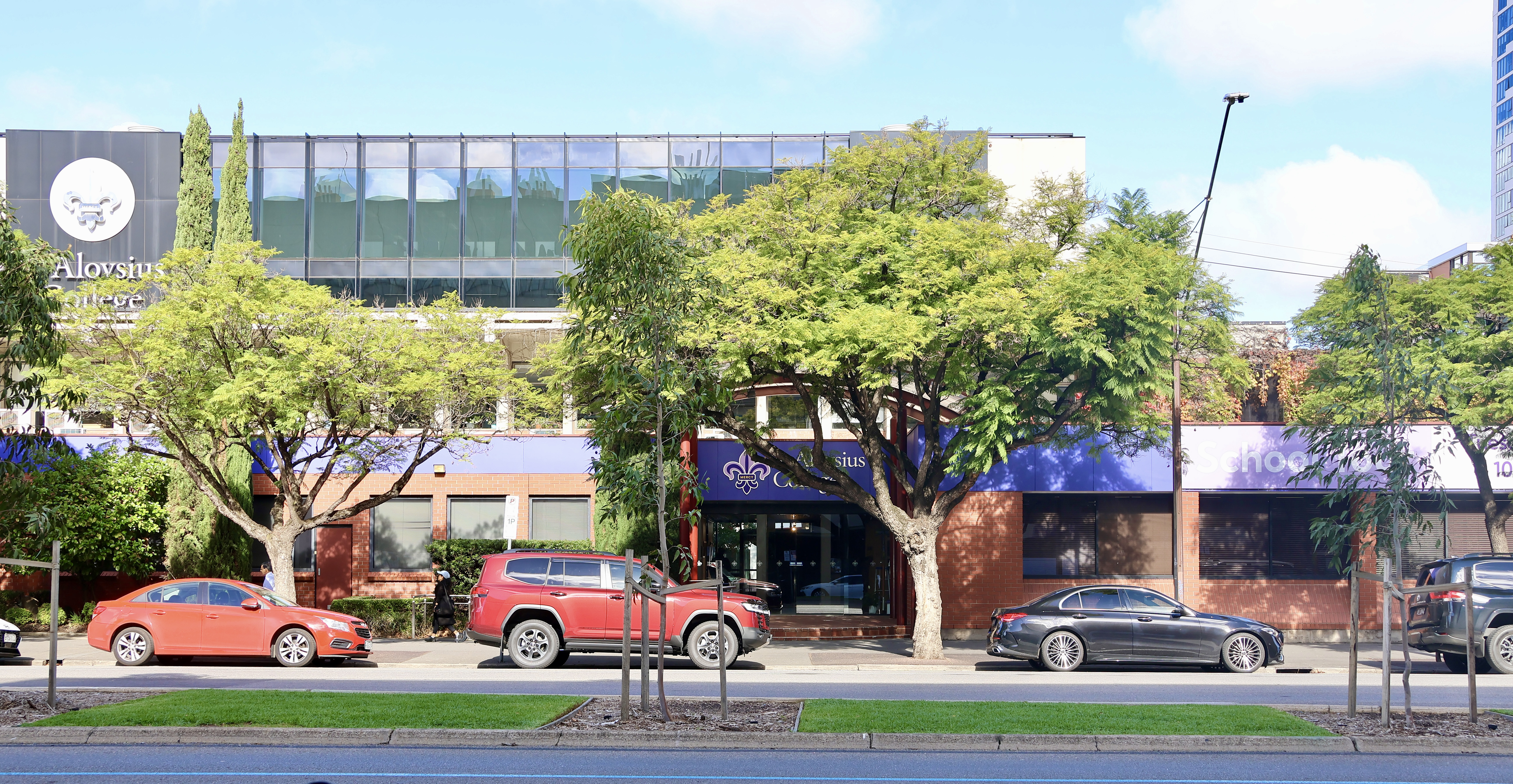
- The college in 2026
- Adelaide, S.A; Australia

Information
- Type: Independent, single-sex, day school
- Motto: Loyal En Tout; Loyal in all
- Denomination: Catholic
- Established: 1880; 146 years ago
- Principal: Paddy McEvoy
- Enrolment: 1300
- Colours: Purple and gold
- Website: www.sac.sa.edu.au

St Aloysius College is a Catholic, day school for girls, situated in Adelaide, South Australia.

St Aloysius College, also known as "SAC", was established by the Sisters of Mercy in 1880, and educates over 1300 students from Reception to Year 12. The school is home to the SA Adelaide Language Centre, established in 1994 and accredited by English Australia for English language tuition.

== History ==
The first Sisters of Mercy were Irish sisters who came to Adelaide from Argentina in 1880, following unrest in Buenos Aires. The same year, the sisters purchased the large home of George Dutton Green in Angas Street, behind St Francis Xavier's Cathedral, and established a convent and school, St Angela's. Part of the order went to Mount Gambier. The original building was extended at various times, and the school was renamed St Aloysius in 1901. In 1920 Mother Cecilia Cunningham received a substantial inheritance from wealthy Argentinian relatives which was used to extend the convent buildings and to build the beautiful chapel. The sisters finally left Angas Street in 2005, at which time the school took control of the entire complex of buildings.

== Notable alumnae and staff ==
- Shabana Azeez, actress
- Sister Diedre Jordan AC MBE, former headmistress of the school then long term Chancellor of Flinders University; as of 2007 Chancellor Emeritus of the university
- Sister Janet Mead (1938–2022), best known for recording a rock version of "The Lord's Prayer"
- Dame Roma Mitchell, first female Governor of South Australia and first female chief justice.
- Clare Moore, Australian musician
- Sister Patricia Pak Poy, former principal of the school, educator, and activist, known for her contributions to social justice, particularly for the ban on the use of landmines
- Sister Judith Redden, school principal in 2007; awarded the Order of Australia for services to Indigenous education

== Social justice ==
SAC has a Social Justice group for the students and this group leads the school community on social justice issues. During the school year, SAC organises fundraising activities, in particular, the school walkathon, "Mercy Day" and "The Can Drive". Other events often occur during the school year, when social justice issues arise. For example, during the February 2009 Victorian bushfires, students collected clothing and supplies to donate to those affected by the bushfires.

== Extracurricular activities ==
=== Sport ===
Students are encouraged to participate in sport during both the summer and winter seasons. For senior students, beach volleyball, basketball, tennis, water polo and softball can be played in the summer, with soccer, netball, hockey and basketball available in winter. A wider range of sports are available for primary school students.

=== Music ===
SAC is known for its extensive music program. Students are encouraged to learn a musical instrument and join in with the musical ensembles at school. In 2008, a grand piano was bought and the St Aloysius Stage Band and vocalists went on a tour of China. St Aloysius College also attends music events around Adelaide and participates in competitions. Recently some of the students went on tour in Vietnam.

=== Duke of Edinburgh ===
The Duke of Edinburgh program is available for students from year 8 onwards, with hundreds of students having an involvement in the program. See Duke of Edinburgh Award

== House system ==
Upon attending their first day at St Aloysius, each student is assigned a house team. Each team is named after a saint. Competitions are arranged between the house teams, with the main competitions being the school swimming carnival and athletic carnivals. The house teams are:

- St Clares – white
- St Annes – purple
- St Margarets – yellow
- St Teresas – green

== See also ==
- List of schools in South Australia
