= Manitoba Centre for Health Policy =

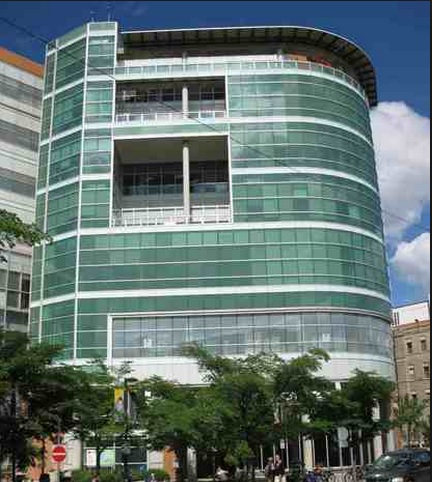
- MCHP is located in the Brodie Centre, on the University of Manitoba's Bannatyne Campus
- Abbreviation: MCHP
- Formation: 1991
- Founder: Dr. Noralou Roos and Dr. Leslie Roos
- Type: Academic Institute
- Legal status: active
- Purpose: Data repository; Concept dictionary; Knowledge Translation; Reports; Publications; Health Information
- Headquarters: Winnipeg, Manitoba, Canada
- Location: Rady Faculty of Health Sciences, 408-727 McDermot Ave., University of Manitoba, Winnipeg, MB Canada R3B 3P5
- Region served: Manitoba
- Official language: English
- Director: Dr. Nathan Nickel
- Parent organization: University of Manitoba
- Staff: 60+
- Website: https://umanitoba.ca/manitoba-centre-for-health-policy/

Manitoba Centre for Health Policy (MCHP) is a public, not-for-profit research unit within the Rady Faculty of Health Sciences at the University of Manitoba (Winnipeg, Manitoba, Canada). MCHP provides and uses population-level administrative data to inform health policy, social policy and health and social service delivery provincially, nationally and internationally. MCHP also creates population-based research on health and the social determinants of health.

== History of MCHP ==
The Manitoba Centre for Health Policy (MCHP) was founded in 1991 by Drs. Noralou Roos and Leslie Roos to study population health and health care services evaluation in Manitoba. MCHP developed and maintains a population-based data repository on behalf of the Government of Manitoba for use by local, national and international research communities. The Manitoba Population Research Data Repository (Repository) contains data on the health, social and economic status of Manitobans, and is used to determine provisions of health and social treatment and prevention services. The Centre’s work is based in Manitoba, but research has also been applied at the national and international levels.

Before the creation of MCHP, founders Drs. Noralou Roos and Leslie Roos conducted numerous health services and population health studies between 1973 and 1990 using data from the Manitoba Health Services Commission, now Manitoba Health. This research broke ground in how data was linked between health services and population health research. Dr. Noralou Roos held a National Health Research Scientist award for 25 years and was awarded a Canada Research Chair in Population Health from 2001-2007 as a result of this research. In 2021, Dr. Noralou Roos was inducted into the Canadian Medical Hall of Fame for her contribution to population health research by using linked administrative data to analyze the social determinants of health. Research by both Drs. Noralou Roos and Leslie Roos created recognition among peers, government and health care service providers of the benefits of population health research in Manitoba. MCHP was created as a result of these efforts.

== Research ==
The population-based data repository contains a large scope of data. The primary research focus has been on Manitobans’ health status and the social determinants of health, however, the addition of a growing number of social data sets into the Repository has allowed MCHP to expand their scope, supporting health equity, and exploring topics like the well-being of Manitoban children. Relationship building and an organizational commitment to reconciliation has led to expanded work in partnership with Métis, First Nations and Inuit organizations, exploring gaps in outcome and provision of services for these populations.

Some examples of research topics arising from the repository include:

- acute and chronic diseases;
- inequities of health and healthcare use;
- use of nursing homes, primary care, hospital care, emergency departments, urgent and critical care;
- use of prescription drugs and alcohol;
- use of family services, income assistance, and social housing;
- cost of hospital care and smoking;
- Paramedic services data and health system contact after methamphetamine has been consumed;
- educational outcomes; and
- evaluation of screening and prevention programs.

Manitoba Health commissions research projects each year which are released publicly. Other research projects are led by research scientists and graduate students both within MCHP, as well as researchers outside of the institute.

== Manitoba Population Research Data Repository ==
MCHP houses the Manitoba Population Research Data Repository, a large collection of person-level data about Manitoba residents that has been de-identified (anonymized) and can be linked.

As of January 2025, there are 98 active data files that are updated annually, and a large number of additional data files that are brought in on a project-basis. The Repository can be accessed by authorized researchers, graduate students and data analysts at MCHP and at nine remote access sites located at the University of Manitoba (Bannatyne campus) and Winnipeg Regional Health Authority facilities.

Most of these data are obtained from administrative data that are collected by Manitoba Health to help administer the universal healthcare system in Manitoba. Data in the Repository provides information relating to health and health services use (e.g., diagnoses, prescriptions, emergency department visits), social services (e.g., income assistance, social housing, involvement with the justice system), education (e.g., Early Development Index, high school graduation) and surveys (e.g., Canadian Community Health Survey).

MCHP also maintains a public documentation library which contains data descriptions and a concept dictionary. The purpose of the library is to provide current information about the data files within the Manitoba Population Research Data Repository, and methods for using the data in population-based research. Data descriptions provide information about the data file, relationships between data sets, data quality reports, and data dictionary with descriptive and statistical details about all data elements. The concept dictionary outlines methods developed at MCHP for analyzing data in the repository, including project-specific approaches, suggested readings and references.

== Privacy, confidentiality and security ==
Users of data in the Repository receive mandatory training about the privacy, confidentiality and security practices at MCHP to protect the privacy of service providers (e.g., doctors) and users (e.g., patients). All data in the Repository are void of information that can be used to identify individuals. Data are protected by a high level of physical and virtual security at access locations.

== The Team ==
MCHP staffs approximately 60 personnel including researchers, data managers, research managers, data analysts, research coordinators, research support, information technologists, knowledge mobilization specialists, finance officers, graduate students and research assistants.

== Collaborators ==
MCHP collaborates with government departments and agencies to maintain and expand the Repository through data sharing agreements. Stakeholders that represent relevant government departments, government agencies, and service providers also participate as co-investigators or advisory group members.

== See also ==
- University of Manitoba
- Manitoba Health Research Council
- Canadian Institute for Health Information
- Canada Health Act
- CIHI
- Health care in Canada
- Knowledge mobilization
- Manitoba Health
- Metadata
- Social determinants of health
