= Kathleen Williams (theologian) =

Australian religious Sister of Mercy and theologian

Kathleen Williams R.S.M.
- Occupations: religious Sister of Mercy; theologian

Academic background
- Education: University of Divinity
- Thesis: Lonergan and the transforming immanence of the transcendent : towards a theology of grace as the dynamic state of being-in-love with God (1998)

Academic work
- Discipline: Systematic Theology
- Institutions: Yarra Theological Union, University of Divinity
- Main interests: grace and theological anthropology, method in theology and mystical theology, Bernard Lonergan
- Website: https://ytu.edu.au/faculty/profiles-of-ytu-lecturers-and-staff/kathleen-williams/

Kathleen Williams RSM is an Australian Sister of Mercy and a theologian at the University of Divinity.

== Education ==
Kathleen Margaret Williams RSM has completed a Bachelor of Arts, a Master of Education (Admin), a Master of Theological Studies and a Doctor of Theology.

== Career ==
Williams lectures in systematic theology at Yarra Theological Union, a member college of the University of Divinity, in Melbourne, Australia. Her areas of focus include grace and theological anthropology, method in theology and mystical theology.

She has a particular research interest is the work of Canadian Jesuit priest, philosopher and theologian Bernard Lonergan. Williams doctoral dissertation, Lonergan and the transforming immanence of the transcendent : towards a theology of grace as the dynamic state of being-in-love with God, was completed in 1998 at the Melbourne College of Divinity.

Williams is a former member of the Executive Council of WOCATI (World Conference of Associations of Theological Institutions).

Williams now supervises postgraduate research students. She also has a particular interest in intercultural theological education. For the past five years has been involved in designing and implementing a program in theology for the women religious sisters in Papua New Guinea, thirteen of whom were the first to graduate in 2019 with a Diploma in Pastoral Ministry.

After fellow Australian Sister of Mercy Janette Gray died in 2017, Williams edited Gray's PhD dissertation which had been undertaken at the University of Cambridge. At the time of her death, Gray was completing a book based on her thesis, The Christian anthropology of M.-D. Chenu, which she had completed in 2010. Marie-Dominique Chenu was on a French Dominican who had proved very influential in preparing for the Second Vatican Council. Gray's book, edited by Williams, M-D Chenu’s Christian Anthropology: Nature and Grace in Society and Church was published posthumously in 2019. The book was launched by Gerald O’Collins, SJ, at gatherings in both Melbourne and Adelaide in May 2019.

The Global Church Project included Williams in its list of "Australian and New Zealander Female Theologians you should get to know in 2020".

== Publications ==
- Gray, Janette (2019). M-D Chenu's Christian Anthropology: Nature and Grace in Society and Church. edited by Kathleen Williams. ATF Press, Hindmarsh. ISBN 978-1-925872-65-1. OCLC 1101278152
- Williams, Kathleen (2018) God's Image Revealed in Authentic Living: Mutual Enrichment through the Drama of Theological Education across Cultures. In: Enfleshing theology: embodiment, discipleship, and politics in the work of M. Shawn Copeland. Lexington Books/Fortress Academic, Lanham, pp. 185–197. ISBN 9781978704053
- Williams, Kathleen (2016) Graced Friendship and Being Oneself: Releasing Excellence. In: Grace and Friendship. Theological Essays in Honor of Fred Lawrence, from his grateful students, edited by M. Shawn Copeland and Jeremy D. Wilkins, with a Foreword Tribute by Frederick E. Crowe. Marquette University Press, Milwaukee, pp. 355–375. ISBN 9781626007109
- Williams, Kathleen (2012) Objectified Conversion as Foundational in Theology: A Conversation between Rosemary Haughton and Bernard Lonergan, S.J. In: Lonergan Workshop: Ongoing Collaboration in the Year of St. Paul, Boston.
- Williams, Kathleen (2009) Christian Living and Critical Enquiry: Friendly Authenticity and Theology as Integrative. In: Together in Ministry: Essays in honour of John Paver. Uniting Academic Press, Melbourne, pp. 169–179. ISBN 9780980580310
