= Leslie Roos =

Canadian researcher

Leslie Leon Roos Jr. (born July 20, 1940 in San Francisco) is a Distinguished Professor in the Rady Faculty of Health Sciences at the University of Manitoba. He was elected as a fellow of the Royal Society of Canada in 2010. He is also a fellow of the Canadian Academy of Health Sciences and was a founding director of the Manitoba Centre for Health Policy.

== Education and academia ==
He received a Bachelor of Arts (Distinction) and Phi Beta Kappa, Psychology, from Stanford University in 1962, a Doctor of Philosophy, Political Science, from the Massachusetts Institute of Technology in 1966, and completed his Postdoctorate, Political Science in 1967. After academic appointments at Brandeis and Northwestern Universities, Roos came to the University of Manitoba, Faculty of Administrative Studies (now the Asper School of Business) in 1973 and moved to the Faculty of Medicine in 1990. Roos joined the Department of Community Health Sciences in the Faculty of Medicine at the University of Manitoba in 1980. The Manitoba Centre for Health Policy (MCHP), which he co-founded with his wife Noralou Roos, has performed a major public service by allowing public policy to be informed and verified by its information rich data.

== Research ==
Roos has worked in the field of enabling information-rich research environments and was responsible for pioneering the use of routinely collected administrative data for research purposes.

Roos was a lead member of the team awarded 2.8 million dollars in the first round of Canadian Foundation for Innovation competition to create a Data Laboratory in 1999- this was literally pioneering the idea of a data laboratory in Canada, since CFI had traditionally only funded wet labs. Supported by the information highway initiative in the mid-1990s, and more recently the Lupina Foundation, Roos also pioneered an Internet-based institutional memory/learning structure, the Concept Dictionary, which has the potential for revolutionizing both the training of researchers and to help communicate the concepts and findings thus making the work done in Manitoba over the last 2 decades accessible to others working in this area. This work represents an effort to document, find and transfer concepts and techniques, both within the local research group and to a more broadly defined user community. Concepts and associated computer programs are made as "modular" as possible to facilitate easy transfer from one project to another. The tools, taken together, make up a knowledge repository and research production system that aid local work and have great potential internationally. The merging of documentation and researcher-to-researcher dissemination keeps costs manageable and provides an innovative method of Knowledge Transfer. Approximately 2 million hits a year have recently been recorded in the Concept Dictionary. Roos also promoted the Concept Dictionary using the Epidemiology Supercourse (over 4000 lectures posted on the Internet, of which he has contributed 6). This design has proved popular with students who have audited his courses from the community and with registered students.

Roos' contributions include a number of papers comparing health and health care in Canada and the United States, looking at how socioeconomic status affects Manitoban's access to health care, and analyzing alternative approaches to funding Canadian Medicare. Roos is currently focusing on critical issues in child health and risk assessment. His work is multidisciplinary with particular implications for improving observational studies in health and education.

== Recognition ==
He has published over 240 peer-reviewed papers and book chapters. In 2004, he was honored as a “Highly Cited Investigator” by the Institute of Scientific Information; he had received approximately 15,200 Google citations as of November 2020. Roos held a Career Scientist Award from the National Health Research and Development Program for over twenty years and was an Associate of the Canadian Institute for Advanced Research. He was the first Canadian Fellow of the Association for Health Services Research. His work contributed substantially to the Manitoba Centre's receipt of the 2001 Health Services Research Advancement Award from the Canadian Health Services Research Foundation and the 2005 Regional Knowledge Translation award from the Canadian Institutes for Health Research.
