= Noralou P. Roos =

American researcher

Noralou Preston Roos FRSC OC (born April 21, 1942, in Pomona, California) is an American-Canadian professor emerita of community health sciences. She has won several awards for her work in health policy, public health, publicly funded health care, and advocacy of evidence-based medicine and health promotion.

== Biography ==
Noralou Preston grew up in California and Oregon with a sister and two brothers. Their parents were married for 67 years. She graduated with an A.B. in 1963 from Stanford University. She married Leslie Leon Roos Jr. on June 17, 1963, in Santa Clara, California. He was born in 1940 in San Francisco. She and her husband both became graduate students at Massachusetts Institute of Technology. She graduated with a Ph.D. in political science in 1968 from Massachusetts Institute of Technology. Her Ph.D. thesis The Turkish Administrative Elite was supervised by Frederick W. Frey (1929–2020). She was at Northwestern University for three years before joining the University of Manitoba in 1972.

Noralou P. Roos is a professor emerita in the Department of Community Health Sciences of the Faculty of Medicine, University of Manitoba. From 1973 to 1998, she was a National Health Research Scientist supported by Canada's National Health Research and Development Program. She has received numerous national and international fellowships and grants. She has published extensively in books and journals in collaboration with her husband. As of the year 2021, according to the Institute for Scientific Information, she is among the leading 100 Canadian scientists in terms of citations to her publications.

Noralou Roos was the founding co-director, with her husband Leslie Roos, of the University of Manitoba's Manitoba Centre for Health Policy (MCHP) and became a co-director of the Get Your Benefits (GYB) project supported by The Winnipeg Foundation. She and her collaborators have researched variations in the medical practices of physicians, outcomes in surgery, factors in the quality of medical care, variations in health care use, and quality, reliability, and use of data in managing the Canadian health care system, Leslie and Noralou Roos have a daughter, son and four grandchildren.

== Awards and honours ==
- 1988 — Woman of the Year Award from YWCA of Manitoba
- 2005 — Appointed Member of the Order of Canada
- 2009 — Elected to the Life Sciences Division, Academy of Science of the Royal Society of Canada
- 2011 — Elected to Fellowship in the Canadian Academy of Health Sciences
- 2016 — Appointed Officer of the Order of Canada
- 2020 — Vanier Medal from the Institute of Public Administration of Canada (IPAC)
- 2021 — Manitoba 150 Women Trailblazers Award
- 2022 — Inducted into Canadian Medical Hall of Fame

== Selected publications ==
- Roos, N. P.; Roos, L. L. (1981). "High and low surgical rates: Risk factors for area residents". American Journal of Public Health. 71 (6): 591–600. doi:10.2105/AJPH.71.6.591. PMC 1619829. PMID 7235097.
- Roos, N. P.; Wennberg, J. E.; McPherson, K. (1988). "Using diagnosis-related groups for studying variations in hospital admissions". Health Care Financing Review. 9 (4): 53–62. PMC 4192882. PMID 10312632.
- Roos, N. P.; Shapiro, E.; Tate, R. (1989). "Does a small minority of elderly account for most health care expenditures? A sixteen-year perspective". The Milbank Quarterly. 67 (3–4): 347–369. doi:10.2307/3350220. JSTOR 3350220. PMID 2517569.
- Roos, N. P.; Havens, B. (1991). "Predictors of successful aging: A twelve-year study of Manitoba elderly". American Journal of Public Health. 81 (1): 63–68. doi:10.2105/AJPH.81.1.63. PMC 1404917. PMID 1898500.
- Mustard, C. A.; Roos, N. P. (1994). "The relationship of prenatal care and pregnancy complications to birthweight in Winnipeg, Canada". American Journal of Public Health. 84 (9): 1450–1457. doi:10.2105/AJPH.84.9.1450. PMC 1615180. PMID 8092370.
- Decoster, C.; Roos, N. P.; Carrière, K. C.; Peterson, S. (1997). "Inappropriate hospital use by patients receiving care for medical conditions: Targeting utilization review". Canadian Medical Association Journal. 157 (7): 889–896. PMC 1228213. PMID 9327796.
- Reid, Robert J.; Roos, Noralou P.; MacWilliam, Leonard; Frohlich, Norman; Black, Charlyn (2002). "Assessing Population Health Care Need Using a Claims-based ACG Morbidity Measure: A Validation Analysis in the Province of Manitoba". Health Services Research. 37 (5): 1345–1364. doi:10.1111/1475-6773.01029. PMC 1464032. PMID 12479500.
- Roos, Leslie L.; Brownell, Marni; Lix, Lisa; Roos, Noralou P.; Walld, Randy; MacWilliam, Leonard (2008). "From health research to social research: Privacy, methods, approaches". Social Science & Medicine. 66 (1): 117–129. doi:10.1016/j.socscimed.2007.08.017. PMID 17919795.
- Roos, N. P.; O'Grady, K.; Singer, S. M.; Turczak, S.; Tapp, C. (2012). "Making Evidence on Health Policy Issues Accessible to the Media". Healthcare Policy. 8 (2): 37–45. doi:10.12927/hcpol.2012.23134. PMC 3517871. PMID 23968614.
