= Arnold Naimark =

Canadian physician and academic

Arnold Naimark OC OM FRSC

9th President of the University of Manitoba
- In office 1981–1996
- Preceded by: Ralph Campbell
- Succeeded by: Emőke Szathmáry

Personal details
- Born: August 24, 1933 (age 93) Winnipeg, Manitoba, Canada
- Education: University of Manitoba

Arnold Naimark OC OM FRSC (born August 24, 1933) is a Canadian physician, academic, and former President of the University of Manitoba.

== Biography ==
Born in Winnipeg, Manitoba, he received a B.Sc.Med. degree in 1957, a Doctor of Medicine degree in 1957, and a Master of Science degree in 1959 from the University of Manitoba.

In 1963, he joined the faculty of the University of Manitoba as an Assistant Professor of Medicine and Physiology. He was appointed Associate Professor in 1965 and Professor in 1967. He was Acting Head of the Faculty from 1966 to 1967 and Head from 1967 to 1971. He was Dean of Faculty of Medicine from 1971 to 1981. From 1981 to 1996, he was the President and Vice-Chancellor.

In 1996, he was appointed Director, Centre for the Advancement of Medicine.

In 1991, he was made an Officer of the Order of Canada "as one of Canada's most distinguished university presidents and an education administrator of international repute". In 2003, he was awarded the Order of Manitoba. In 1987, he was made a Fellow of the Royal Society of Canada. He has received honorary degrees from Mount Allison University and University of Toronto. In 2013, he was inducted into the Canadian Medical Hall of Fame.

The Naimark Fellow Award in his honour recognizes professional excellence among Canada's health services leaders, and is awarded annually by the Canadian Foundation for Healthcare Improvement.
