= Janis Johnson =

Canadian politician (born 1946)

The Honourable Janis G. Johnson CM OM

Canadian Senator from Manitoba
- In office September 27, 1990 – September 27, 2016
- Appointed by: Brian Mulroney
- Succeeded by: Mary Jane McCallum

Personal details
- Born: April 27, 1946 (age 80) Winnipeg, Manitoba, Canada
- Party: Conservative
- Spouse: Frank Moores (1973–2005; his death)
- Children: 1
- Education: University of Manitoba (BA)
- Occupation: Businesswoman; public affairs consultant

Janis Guðrún Johnson CM OM (born April 27, 1946) is a retired Canadian politician who served as a senator, representing the province of Manitoba.

Serving her position for 26 years until her retirement, Johnson is the longest-serving senator of Manitoba. She is also the longest-serving Conservative member of Senate, and was the first woman to serve as the national director of the former Progressive Conservative Party of Canada.

== Early life and education ==
Janis Guðrún Johnson was born in Winnipeg on 27 April 1946, to Doris Marjorie Blöndal and George Johnson. George was the Minister of Health and Public Welfare in the Manitoba Legislature, later becoming the province's 20th Lieutenant Governor. Her mother was of Icelandic ancestry.

Johnson attended Kelvin High School and the University of Winnipeg Collegiate, where she graduated in 1965. She went on to receive a Bachelor of Arts degree in political science with honours standing in 1968 from the University of Manitoba. She was also a leader of the university's students' union.

== Career ==
After completing her degree in 1968, Johnson moved to Ottawa, where she was a youth policy advisor to the Robert Stanfield, then-leader of the Progressive Conservative Party of Canada. She went on to become policy advisor to the party president.

From 1971 to 1979, Johnson worked closely with Frank Moores, helping to organize his campaign for Premier of Newfoundland, which led to the defeat of Joey Smallwood in 1971. (Johnson and Moores would later marry in 1973.)

In 1979, she returned to Manitoba and became an advisor to Premier Sterling Lyon, whereafter she set up the first Progressive Conservative Women's Caucus of Winnipeg. She also worked as a freelance consultant in public affairs as well as being a lecturer in the University of Manitoba's Faculty of Continuing Education.

In 1983, she served as Manitoba co-chair of Brian Mulroney's successful campaign for national PC leadership, becoming the first woman to serve as the national director of the federal PC Party in September.

In 1985, Johnson established a public policy and communications firm in Winnipeg, called Janis Johnson & Associates, which worked in the areas of women's health and equality, Indigenous affairs, and cultural policy. That year, she joined the Canadian National Railways board of directors, where she served until 1990; Johnson notably convinced CN to establish a head office daycare, a first in Canada's corporate sector.

=== Senate career ===
In 1990, Johnson was appointed to represent the province of Manitoba in the Senate by Prime Minister Brian Mulroney. She was a senior member of the Standing Senate Committee on Foreign Affairs and International Trade, the Senate Committee on Energy, the Environment and Natural Resources, and Senate Chair of the Canada-United States Inter-Parliamentary Group.

Johnson's first speech in the Senate was about the Mulroney government's anti-abortion bill, which she voted against.

In 2014, Johnson became the Honorary Chair of Nature Canada's Women for Nature Initiative.

In 2015, Johnson was named among 30 senators in an audit of Senate expenses. She criticized the report, but later repaid the $22,706 it said she owed in questionable travel expenses, maintaining that they were legitimate and the report was incorrect.

Johnson retired from the Senate on September 27, 2016, exactly 26 years after she was appointed. She was the longest-serving Conservative member of the Senate and Manitoba's longest-serving senator.

=== Volunteerism ===
Johnson has also been active in the volunteer sector. Active in the Icelandic Festival of Manitoba, she founded the Gimli Film Festival in 2000, which she continues to chair.

She was also a founding member of the Manitoba Special Olympics board and sat on the Canadian Special Olympics board for 10 years. Johnson has also served on the advisory board of the Royal Winnipeg Ballet, as well as the board of directors of the University of Winnipeg, Prairie Theatre Exchange, and the Winnipeg Art Gallery.

She also contributed to the founding of the Mature Women's Health Clinic (now the Women's Health Centre) and assisted in the development of Qaumajuq at the Winnipeg Art Gallery.

== Personal life ==
Johnson was the second wife of Frank Moores, whom Johnson worked closely with and helped to organize his (successful) campaign for Premier of Newfoundland in 1971.

The two married in 1973, and had one son, Stefan Moores, in 1975.

== Awards and honours ==
Johnson is the recipient of many honours, including:

- Velia Stern Outstanding Student Award from the University of Manitoba (1968)
- Queen's Silver (1977), Golden (2003), and Diamond (2012) Jubilee Medals
- Doctor of Laws honorary degree from the University of Manitoba (2018)
- Canada 125 Medal for Community Service (1993)
- Special Olympics Award for Volunteerism (1994)
- Business and Professional Women's Award (1995)
- Winnipeg School Division 125th Anniversary Award (1996)
- Outstanding Alumni Award from the University of Manitoba (2009)

In August 2000, she became one of the few Canadians to be awarded Iceland's Order of the Falcon by the Government of Iceland, for her efforts in promoting Canada–Iceland relations.

In 2022, Johnson was appointed to the Order of Canada, and in July 2023, was inducted into the Order of Manitoba.

In 2014, she was the first Honorary Chair of Women for Nature, an initiative of Nature Canada, one of the country's leading nature and outdoors advocacy organizations.
