= Patricia Pak Poy =

Australian religious sister, educator and activist

Patricia Geraldine Pak Poy
- Born: October 16, 1935; Darwin, Northern Territory, Australia
- Died: February 24, 2026 (aged 90); Adelaide, South Australia
- Education: St Aloysius College, Adelaide
- Occupations: Humanitarian, religious sister, and educator
- Known for: Social justice advocacy, particularly for the ban on the use of landmines.

Sister Patricia Pak Poy was an Australian religious sister, educator and activist known for her contributions to social justice, particularly for the ban on the use of landmines.

== Life and education ==
Pak Poy was born on 16 October 1935 in Darwin, Australia to Chinese immigrant parents, Alberta Chee Quee and William Pak Poy. She and her five siblings grew up in Darwin, where their father owned a general store. The family evacuated to Adelaide during World War II to escape the impending threat of Japanese bombings in Darwin.

She attended St Aloysius College, Adelaide from the age of six, and later, the University of Adelaide, where she studied arts and trained to become a teacher. Following a year as a lay teacher at St Aloysius College, she entered the Sisters of Mercy in 1957 and made her Final Profession in 1962. In 1963, she obtained a Diploma of Education and travelled to the United States for further studies. From July 1970 to May 1976 she returned to Adelaide undertake the role of Principal of St Aloysius College.

Patricia Pak Poy died on 24 February 2026 in Adelaide, South Australia at the age of 90.

== Humanitarian work ==
After joining the Sisters of Mercy, Pak Poy dedicated herself to education and social justice causes. She was involved in many social justice projects, including the opening of Catherine House, a crisis centre in Adelaide for women experiencing homelessness, as well as the Catholic Commission for Justice and Peace, and Australian Catholic Relief.

Her work took her to Asia, where she collaborated with the Jesuit Refugee Service to improve the lives of refugees in Thailand, Cambodia, and Vietnam. During this time, she became acutely aware of the urgent need for landmine clearance in Cambodia and the need for support of the civilian victims. This experience prompting her to start advocating for a ban on the use of landmines, which she did by studying refugee law and networking globally with Human Rights and humanitarian organisations and councils.

== The ban of landmines ==
She made contact with the Halo Trust whilst in the UK at Oxford University, and upon returning to Australia, Pak Poy took on the role of the first National Coordinator of the Australian Network of the International Campaign to Ban Landmines (ICBL-AN). Under her leadership, the organisation played a crucial role in changing Australian government policy. In 1995, ICBL-AN launched a petition calling for a total ban on anti-personnel landmines.

In 1997, she represented Australia as a non-government member of the Australian Delegation to the discussions and negotiations for the UN Review of the Convention on Certain Conventional Weapons and Protocol II and the Convention on the Prohibition of the Use, Stockpiling, Production and Transfer of Antipersonnel Mines and on their Destruction. She was present when the then Australian Minister for Foreign Affairs, Alexander Downer, signed the Ottawa Treaty, banning the use of landmines

The treaty came into force on 1 March 1999 and in that same year, the International Campaign to Ban Landmines (ICBL), headed internationally by Jody Williams, was awarded the Nobel Peace Prize

== Awards and recognition ==
Pak Poy has been recognised in Australia and internationally for her humanitarian work, including:

- 1997 - International Campaign to Ban Landmines (ICBL) campaign is awarded the Nobel Peace Prize
- 1998 - Member of the Order of Australia, "for service to the community particularly as national coordinator of the Australian Network of the International Campaign to Ban Landmines since its inception in 1993."
- 1998 - Returned Services League ANZAC Peace Prize
- 2002 - Human Rights Award from the Human Rights and Equal Opportunity Commission
- 2003 - Honorary Doctorate from the Australian Catholic University

== Memberships ==
- Chief Patron of the UN Association of Australia (SA Division)
- Human Rights Council of Australia.
- Hope Adelaide Inc.
- Chair of the Management Committee of the Incorporated Association of Australian Sisters of Mercy (Mercy Works Inc.)

== Publications ==
- Pak-Poy, Patricia & Tasmanian Peace Trust (1998). Building our capacity for peace. Tasmanian Peace Trust, [Hobart].
- Fisher, Rosie & Pak-Poy, Patricia & South Australia. Children's Interests Bureau (1986). Children are residents too! : children in the housing estate : a set of guidelines for planning. Children's Interests Bureau, [Adelaide].
- Pak-Poy, Patricia (Contributor) & United Faculty of Theology - Jesuit Theological College (Contributor) & Gray, Janette (Creator) (2006). Campaigning to Ban Landmines: A Theological Reflection. David Lovell.
- Pak-Poy, Patricia (Contributor) & United Faculty of Theology - Uniting Church Theological College (Contributor) & Massam, Katharine (Creator) (2006). Ethics and Theology in the Public Square: the Australian Network of the International Campaign to Ban Landmines. David Lovell.
- Pak-Poy, Patricia & Catholic Commission for Justice and Peace (Australia) (1980). Development education : some thoughts on education to justice in the Australian context : a short paper prepared in response to an invitation of the bishops of the Episcopal Committee for Development and Peace. Catholic Commission for Justice and Peace, Brickfield Hill [N.S.W.].
- Pak Poy, Patricia & Pak-Poy, Patricia, (editor.) & International Campaign to Ban Landmines. Australian Network, (contributor.) (2006). A path is made by walking it : reflections on the Australian Network to Ban Landmines, 1991-2006. David Lovell Publishing in conjunction with ICBL Australian Network to Ban Landmines, East Kew, Vic.
