= George J. Armelagos =

American anthropologist

- Born: May 22, 1936; Detroit, Michigan
- Died: May 15, 2014 (aged 77); Atlanta, Georgia
- Education: University of Michigan (BA) (1958); University of Colorado (MA) (1963); University of Colorado (PhD) (1968)
- Occupation: Anthropologist
- Organization: Emory University
- Awards: Viking Fund Medal (2005); Franz Boas Award for Exemplary Service to Anthropology (2008); Charles Darwin Award for Lifetime Achievement to Biological Anthropology (2009)

George J. Armelagos (May 22, 1936 – May 15, 2014) was an American anthropologist, and Goodrich C. White Professor of Anthropology at Emory University in Atlanta, Georgia. Armelagos significantly impacted the field of physical anthropology and biological anthropology. His work has provided invaluable contributions to the theoretical and methodological understanding human disease, diet and human variation within an evolutionary context. Relevant topics include epidemiology, paleopathology, paleodemography, bioarchaeology, evolutionary medicine, and the social interpretations of race, among others.

Armelagos is regarded as one of the founders of paleopathology and nutritional anthropology.

== Early life and education ==
Armelagos was the son of Greek immigrants and he was born in Lincoln Park, Michigan. He received a B.A. with honors in Anthropology from the University of Michigan-Ann Arbor in 1958. He then entered the Medical School at Michigan-Ann Arbor (1958), transferred a year later into the Rackham Graduate School in Anthropology at Michigan (1959), where he met Jack Kelso. He would later follow Kelso to the Anthropology Department at the University of Colorado, Boulder where he received both his M.A. (1963) and Ph.D. (1968) degrees. It was at Colorado that he formulated his early ideas the nature of disease and the need for a bio-cultural approach to explain the relationship between the evolution of disease and the human response to it.

Upon graduating from the University of Colorado, Armelagos taught at the University of Utah (1965–1968) and was then hired at the University of Massachusetts, where he aided in the creation of the Ph.D. program in Anthropology.

== Career ==
During his 22-year career at the University of Massachusetts, Armelagos would train over a dozen anthropologists that would themselves contribute to research in human variation and adaptation, paleopathology, and skeletal biology and hold high ranking positions in the major associations for the discipline. He chaired Section H (Anthropology), American Association for the Advancement of Science (AAAS)(1997), and was President of the American Association of Physical Anthropologists (1987–1989). His graduate students included Owen Lovejoy, John Lallo, Ann Magennis, Rebecca Huss-Ashmore, Dennis van Gerven, Michael Blakey, Jerome Rose, Pamela Bumsted, David Carlson, Lesley Rankin-Hill, Debra Martin, Anne Grauer, Alan H. Goodman, and Brenda Baker. While a professor at the University of Massachusetts he would receive many awards, including the University Distinguished Teacher (1973) and the Chancellor's Medalist (1980).

Retiring from Massachusetts in 1990 his career was far from over. He would serve three years as chair of the Anthropology Department at the University of Florida and affiliate curator at the Florida Museum of Natural History before taking his current position as the Goodrich C. White Professor of Anthropology at Emory University in Georgia where he has trained a whole new generation of anthropologists (Tad Schurr, Kristin Harper, Bethany Turner, Amber Campbell Hibbs, and Molly Zuckerman) working on understanding the evolution of disease from a biocultural approach receiving the George Cuttino Award for Mentoring (2002). He was the Viking Fund Medalist, Wenner Gren Foundation, (2005), considered one of anthropology's highest honors. Armelagos received the Franz Boas Award for Exemplary Service to Anthropology, American Anthropological Association (2008) and the Charles Darwin Award for Lifetime Achievement to Biological Anthropology, American Association of Physical Anthropologists (2009). Armelagos published over a dozen books and monographs, has numerous book chapters and well over 250 journal articles.

== Death ==
He died at his home in Atlanta from pancreatic cancer. He was 77.

== Awards and recognition ==
- Chancellor's Lecture, University of Massachusetts, 1980
- Chancellor's Medalist, University of Massachusetts, 1980
- Distinguished Lecture, General Anthropology Division, American Anthropological Association. 1994
- Distinguished Lecture, Biological Anthropology Unit, American Anthropological Association, 2005
- Viking Fund Medal, 2005
- Frans Boas Award for Exemplary Service, 2008
- Charles Darwin Award for Lifetime Achievement, 2009
- Journal of Anthropological Research Distinguished Lecture, 2009

== Bibliography ==
- Armelagos, George J. 1969. Disease in Ancient Nubia. Science 163 (3864): 255 259. (reprinted once)
- Alan C. Swedlund and George J. Armelagos. 1969 Une Recherche in Paleo demographie: la Nubia Soudanaise. Annales: Economies, Societies, Civilizations 24(6): 1287 1298.
- George J. Armelagos and John R. Dewey. 1970. Evolutionary Response to Human Infectious Disease. Bioscience 20: 241 275.
- George J. Armelagos, J. Mielke, K. O. Owen, D. P. Van Gerven, J. R. Dewey and P. E. Mahler. 1972. Bone Growth and Development in Prehistoric Populations from Sudanese Nubia. Journal of Human Evolution 1: 89 119.
- Dennis P. Van Gerven, Dennis P., David S. Carlson and George J. Armelagos. 1974. Racial History and Bio Cultural Adaptation of Nubian Archaeological Populations. Journal of African History XXIV (4): 555 564.
- George J. Armelagos and Alan McArdle. 1975. Population, Disease and Evolution. In Population Studies in Archaeology and Biological Anthropology. Alan C. Swedlund, ed. Society for American Archaeology, Memoir 30:1 10. American Antiquity 40(2) Part 2:1-10.
- James A Moore., Alan C, Swedlund and George J. Armelagos. 1975. The Use of the Life Table in Paleodemography. In Population Studies in Archaeology and Biological Anthropology. Alan C. Swedlund, ed. Society for American Archaeology, Memoir 30:57 70. American Antiquity 40(2) Part 2.
- George J. Armelagos, George J., Alan Goodman and Kenneth H. Jacobs. 1978. The Ecological Perspective in Disease. In Health and the Human Condition: Perspectives in Medical Anthropology, M.H. Logan and F. Hunt, eds. pp. 71–84. North Scituate, Massachusetts: Duxbury Press.
- Mensforth, Robert P., C. Owen Lovejoy, John W. Lallo and George J. Armelagos. 1978. The Role of Constitutional Factors, Diet, and Infectious Disease in the Etiology of Porotic Hyperostosis and Periosteal Reactions in Prehistoric Infants and Children. Medical Anthropology 2(1): 1 59.
- Jerome R. Rose, John W, Lallo and George J. Armelagos. 1978. Histological Enamel Indicator of Childhood Stress in a Prehistoric Population. American Journal of Physical Anthropology 49(4): 511 516.
- Debra Martin and George J. Armelagos. 1979. Morphometrics of Compact Bone: An Example from Sudanese Nubia. American Journal of Physical Anthropology 51(4): 571 57
- Alan H. Goodman, Jerome R. Rose and George J. Armelagos. Enamel Hypoplasias as Indicators of Stress in Three Prehistoric Populations from Illinois. Human Biology 52(3): 515 528
- Peter Farb and George J. Armelagos. 1980. Consuming Passions: The Anthropology of Eating. Boston: Houghton Mifflin.
- E. Bassett, M. Keith, G. J. Armelagos, D. Martin, and A. Villanueva. 1980. Tetracycline Labeled Human Bone from Prehistoric Sudanese Nubia (A.D. 350). Science 209:1532 1534.
- Peter Farb and George J. Armelagos. 1980. The Food Connection 1980. Natural History 89(9): 26 30.
- Rebecca Huss-Ashmore, Rebecca, Alan H. Goodman and George J. Armelagos. 1982. Nutritional Inferences from Paleopathology. In Advances in Archaeological Method and Theory, 5:385 473. M. Schiffer, ed., New York: Academic Press
- George J. Armelagos, David S. Carlson and Dennis P. Van Gerven. 1982. The Theoretical Foundations and Development of Skeletal Biology. In A History of Physical Anthropology, 1930 1980. F. Spencer, ed. Pp. 305 328. New York: Academic Press.
- C. Owen Lovejoy, Robert P. Mensforth and George J. Armelagos. 1982. Five Decades of Skeletal Biology as Reflected in Pages of the American Journal of Physical Anthropology (1930 1940). In A History of Physical Anthropology, 1930 1980, F. Spencer, ed. pp. 329–336. New York: Academic Press.
- Mark N. Cohen and George J, Armelagos. Editors. 1984 Paleopathology at the Origins of Agriculture. Orlando, FL: Academic Press.
- Pete Farb and George J. Armelagos. 1985. Anthropologie Des Coutumes Alimentaires Paris: DeNoel (Translation of Consuming Passions The Anthropology of Eating).
- Alan C. Swedlund and George J. Armelagos. Editors. 1990. Disease in Populations in Transition: Anthropological and Epidemiological Perspective. South Hadley: Bergin and Garvey.
- George J. Armelagos, Alan H. Goodman and Kenneth Jacobs. 1991. The Origins of Agriculture: Population Growth During a Period of Declining Health. In Cultural Change and Population Growth: An Evolutionary Perspective. W. Hern. ed. Population and Environment 13(1): 9-22.
- R. L. Miller, R.L. G. J. Armelagos, S. Ikram, N. De Jonge, F. W. Krijer, A. N. Deedler. 1992. Paleoepidemiology of Schistosoma infection in Mummies. British Medical Journal 304: 355–356
- Lynn M. Sibley George J. Armelagos and Dennis P. VanGerven. 1992. Obstetric Dimensions of the True Pelvis in a Medieval Population from Sudanese Nubia. American Journal of Physical Anthropology 89(4): 421–430.
- Alan H. Goodman and George J. Armelagos. 1996. Race, Racism and the New Physical Anthropology. In Race and other Misadventures: Essays in Honor of Ashley Montagu in his Ninetieth Year. L. Reynolds and L. Lieberman, eds. pp. 174–186. Dix Hills, New York: General Hall, Inc.
- Ronald Barrett, Christopher W. Kuzawa, Thomas McDade and George J. Armelagos. 1998. Emerging Infectious Disease and the Third Epidemiological Transition. Annual Review Anthropology 27: 247–271. Palo Alto: Annual Reviews Inc.
- Armelagos, George J. 1998. The Viral Superhighway The Sciences 38 (1): 24-29 (reprinted 18 times).
- George J. Armelagos and Alan H. Goodman. Race, Racism, and Anthropology. 1998. In Building a New Biocultural Synthesis: Political-Economic Perspectives on Human Biology. Alan H. Goodman and Thomas Leatherman, eds. pp 359–377. Ann Arbor: University of Michigan Press.
- Ryan Brown and George J. Armelagos. 2001. Apportionment of Racial Diversity: A review. Evolutionary Anthropology 10:15-20.
- George J. Armelagos, Kristi Kohlbacher, Kristy R. Collins, Jennifer Cook, and Maria Karfield-Daugherty. 2001. Tetracycline Consumption in Prehistory. In Tetracyclines in Biology, Chemistry and Medicine. M. Nelson, W. Hillen, and R.A. Greenwald, eds. pp. 217–235. Basil: Birkhauser Verlag AG.
- George J. Armelagos. 2003. Bioarcheology as Anthropology. In Archaeology is Anthropology. S. D. Gillespie and D. Nichols, ed. PP. 27–41. Archeological Papers of the American Anthropological Association Series, No 13.
- George J. Armelagos. 2004. Emerging disease in the third epidemiological transition. The Changing Face of Disease: Implications for Society. N. Mascie-Taylor, J. Peters and S. T. McGarvey. Boca Raton, FL, CRC. Society for the Study of Human Biology Series, 43: 7-23.
- George J. Armelagos 2004. Du Bois, Boas and Study of Race. Hamline Review. 28: 1-21.
- George J. Armelagos and Kristin N. Harper. 2005. Genomics at the Origins of Agriculture, Part One. Evolutionary Anthropology. 14 (2):68-77. Part Two. I4 (3):100-121.
- Armelagos, George J. 2008. Biocultural Anthropology at its Origins: Transformation of the New Physical Anthropology in the 1950s. Chapter 20, pg 269–282. In A. J. Kelso (Ed.), The Tao of Anthropology. Gainesville: University of Florida Press.
- Kristin N. Harper, Paolo S. Ocampo, Bret M. Steiner, Robert W. George, Michael S. Silverman, Shelly Boltin, Allan Pillay, Nigel J. Saunders, and George J. Armelagos. 2008. On the Origin of the Treponematoses: A Phylogenetic Approach. PLoS Neglected Tropical Diseases, 2 (1):e148.
- Kristin N. Harper, Hsi Liu, Paolo S. Ocampo, Bret M. Steiner and George J. Armelagos. 2008. The evolution of the acidic repeat protein (arp) gene in Treponema pallidum: implications for pathogenicity and history. FEMS Immunology & Medical Microbiology. 53(3): 322–332.
- George J. Armelagos. 2009. The Paleolithic Disease-scape, the Hygiene Hypothesis, and the Second Epidemiological Transition. The Hygiene Hypothesis and Darwinian Medicine. Pg. 29–43. G. A. Rock, ed. Birkhauser Publishing, Basel, Switzerland.
- George J. Armelagos, Alan H. Goodman, Kristin N. Harper and Michael L. Blakey. 2009. Enamel Hypoplasia and Earlier Mortality: Bioarchaeological Support for the Barker Hypothesis. Evolutionary Anthropology 18: 261–271.
- George J. Armelagos. 2010. Omnivore's Dilemma: The Evolution of the Brain and the Determinates of Food Choice. Journal of Anthropological Research 66(2):161-186.
- Nelson, Mark, Jeffery Hochberg, Andrew Dinardo, George J. Armelagos. 2010. Spectroscopic Characterization of Tetracycline in Skeletal Remains of an Ancient Population from Sudanese Nubia 350CE-550CE. American Journal of Physical Anthropology 143: 151–154.
- George J. Armelagos and Kristin N. Harper. 2010. Emerging Infectious Diseases, Urbanization and Globalization in the Time of Global Warming in The New Blackwell Companion to Medical Sociology. pp. 291–311. William C. Cockerham, ed. Hoboken, NJ: Wiley Publishing.
- Molly K. Zuckerman and George J. Armelagos. 2011. The origins of the biocultural dimensions in bioarchaeology. Social Bioarchaeology. Sabrina C. Agarwal and Bonnie Glencross, eds. pp. 15–43. Malden, MA: Wiley Publishing.
