= Canadian Feed the Children =

Toronto charity

Kinvia, Previously known as Canadian Feed The Children
- Formation: 1986
- Type: Non-governmental organization
- Website: https://kinvia.ca/

Canadian Feed The Children, now known as Kinvia, is a Canadian charity, based in Toronto, Ontario. It is a secular non-governmental organization (NGO), working in international development, and partners with community-based groups working to alleviate poverty in developing countries including Bolivia, Ethiopia, Ghana and Uganda, and in Indigenous communities in Canada. It is a registered Canadian charity with a mission to unlock children's potential through community-led action in Canada and around the world.

The organization has programs that focus primarily on food security, including nutrition, education and capacity-building.

== History ==
The agency was founded in 1986 as Canadian Feed The Children in the province of British Columbia, Canada. In the early 1990s, the head office moved to Toronto, Ontario, and application was made under the Canada Corporations Act, Part II, to form a corporation without share capital and also to obtain a charitable registration number. Consumer and Corporate Affairs Canada issued a Letters Patent dated July 10, 1992, in the name of Canadian Feed The Children. In 2019, the Canadian government provided 2 million CAD in funding to the organization as part of a three-year project to improve the empowerment of girls and women in Ethiopia and Ghana. The charity experienced hardship in 2022, attributed to lower donations as a result of high inflation rates. The organization is part of the Canadian International Education Policy Working Group (CIEPWG).

== Finance and accountability ==
Fiscal responsibility and accountability is important to Canadian Feed The Children. The organization has been recognized for its best practice in financial accountability, governance and transparency by Queen's University Centre for Governance and the Certified Professional Accountants of Ontario, being named a finalist in the Voluntary Sector Reporting Awards in 2011, 2012 and 2013 and winning the award in its category in 2012, 2013 and 2014 to earn Exemplar status.

The organization was also one out of a selective group of Canada-based non-profits certified by Imagine Canada under its Standards Program in May 2013 and has maintained that accreditation since.

For details on Canadian Feed The Children's revenues and expenses, please see its annual report and audited financial statements.

== See also ==
- UN Millennium Development Goals
