= David Barnard =

Canadian computer scientist (born 1951)

David Barnard OM

11th President of the University of Manitoba
- In office 2008–2020
- Preceded by: Emőke Szathmáry
- Succeeded by: Michael Benarroch

5th President of the University of Regina
- In office 1998–2005
- Succeeded by: Robert Hawkins

Personal details
- Born: 1951 (age 74–75)
- Education: University of Toronto

David T. Barnard OM (born 1951) is a Canadian computer scientist and academic, who served as the 11th president and vice-chancellor of the University of Manitoba from 2008 to 2020. He was also chair of Universities Canada.

== Professional biography ==
Barnard received a Bachelor of Science degree from the University of Toronto in 1973, followed by a Master of Science degree in 1975, and a Ph.D. in 1981, all in Computer Science.

Barnard also holds a Diploma of Christian Studies (Dip.C.S.) in theological studies from Regent College, University of British Columbia, and a Master of Laws from Osgoode Hall, York University.

He began his academic career at Queen's University in 1977, eventually becoming a Professor in the Computing and Information Science Department.

In 1996, he was appointed Vice-President (Administration) and Controller at the University of Regina, where he went on to serve as President and Vice-Chancellor from 1998 to 2005. From 2005 to 2008, he was the COO and Chief Technology Officer of iQmetrix.

Barnard began serving a five-year term as president and vice-chancellor of University of Manitoba in 2008. In 2011, Barnard made a formal statement of apology and reconciliation to residential school survivors in front of the Truth and Reconciliation Commission of Canada, the first leader of a post-secondary institution to do so. He was appointed to a second five-year term in 2013 and his term was extended for two more years in 2016. His term ended on June 30, 2020. He was subsequently appointed President Emeritus by the University of Manitoba Board of Governors.

=== Board positions ===
Some of the institutions that Barnard was or is currently a board member of include:

- Bank of Canada (2005-2007)
- Canada West Foundation
- Canadian Research Knowledge Network
- Canadian Scholarship Trust Foundation
- CentrePort Canada
- Digital Research Alliance of Canada (2020-2023)
- Greystone Capital Management (since 2007)
- 2018 Manitoba Electoral Divisions Boundaries Commission.
- NetSecure Technologies (since 2007)
- Order of Manitoba Advisory Council
- Payments Canada
- Royal Society of Canada
- Saskatchewan Power Corporation (2000-2003)
- Saint Boniface Hospital (since 2008)
- World University Service of Canada

== Honours ==
In 2018, he was made a member of the Order of Manitoba, as well as being elected as a new Fellow of the Royal Society of Canada.
