= Gladys Cook =

Gladys Evelyn Taylor Cook OM (August 18, 1929 - May 9, 2009) was a Canadian Dakota elder and activist. Her Dakota names were Topah-hde-win and Wakan-maniwin.

Cook was a native of the Sioux Valley First Nation in Manitoba. At the age of 4, she was sent to a residential school in Elkhorn, Manitoba, where she remained until she was 16. While there, she was forced to deny her heritage. While there, she was raped four times, the first time in 1937. After leaving school she moved to Yankton, South Dakota, to work as a hospital housekeeper. At the end of the Second World War, she worked on a hospital ship ferrying wounded soldiers from Guam and Hawaii to San Diego, California. After her return to Yankton, she married a local, Cliff Cook, also Dakota, in 1950. With him she had three children; he was alcoholic, and beat her and their children, so eventually she left him and moved to Portage la Prairie, Manitoba. There, she worked at another residential school and cleaned local homes. She left her children with family during this time. Cook would become a leader in the Anglican Church. From 1978 until 1996, she coordinated the National Native Alcohol and Drug Abuse Program in Portage la Prairie. She also educated people about the abuses which went on in residential schools and Native Christianity. In 1991, she confronted her rapist at a school reunion, ultimately forgiving him. Cook died in Portage la Prairie.

In her life, Gladys was involved in different activities and with different groups such as: The Crime, Alcohol and Drug Committee; the Youth Justice Committee, the Quest Group Home for Girls, the Women’s Correctional Centre, the Saint Norbert Foundation, the Agassiz Youth Centre. She was a member of the Anglican Church and was always helping Indians who were abused at the residential schools.

== Awards ==
During her life Gladys won multiple awards including the Governor General's Award, the Order of Manitoba, the 125th Anniversary of the Confederation of Canada Medal, the Premier's Volunteer Service Award, the YM/YWCA Woman of Distinction Award, the Manitoba Medical Association Award for Health or Safety Promotion, the Order of Rupertsland and the National Aboriginal Achievement Award.
