= Bob Brennan =

New Zealand missionary priest (1941–2026)

- 안광훈
- Born: Robert John Brennan; 14 December 1941; Auckland, New Zealand
- Died: 21 March 2026 (aged 84); Seoul, South Korea
- Citizenship: Korean (from 2020)
- Ordained: 3 July 1965

Robert John Brennan (Korean: 안광훈; 14 December 1941 – 21 March 2026) was a New Zealand priest. He was a social activist and missionary with the Missionary Society of St. Columban in South Korea.

== Early life ==
Born in Auckland on 14 December 1941, Brennan was the son of Sadie Marie Brennan (née Collins) and Robert Edward Brennan. He spent his childhood in Auckland, where he was educated at St Peter's College. Brennan joined St Columban's in 1959, and trained for the missionary priesthood in Australia. He was ordained a priest by James Liston at St Patrick's Cathedral, Auckland, on 3 July 1965.

== Life in South Korea ==
Brennan was sent to South Korea in 1966, and following two years of learning the Korean language, spent 12 years in the poor coal-mining mountainous area of Kang Won Province. As well as being the parish priest, he established credit unions to support local farmers, and built a clinic run by the Franciscan Missionaries of Mary.

In 1979, Brennan handed over his parish to a Korean priest, and undertook studies at the Jesuit School of Theology at Berkeley in California, completing a master's degree in sacred theology. In 1980, he returned to Seoul, where he was involved in housing rights, and advocated for people being dispossessed of their homes in the name of redevelopment. On 4 September 2012, he was awarded the City of Seoul's Grand Prize for Social Welfare, in recognition of his 32-year fight for and on behalf of evictees in the city. The mayor of Seoul, Park Won-soon, made the award at a public ceremony, saying in his address of congratulations:

"The blue-eyed foreigner is a model of selfless dedication and sacrifice on behalf of the poorest members of our city".

From 2004, Brennan ran the Samyang Resident Solidarity, assisting people looking for jobs and providing small loans. In 2012, Brennan was granted honorary citizenship of the city of Seoul, in recognition of his community services including financial services, job counselling, and housing for the homeless and evictees. He was quoted as saying: "I, myself, have been evicted from my house three times and I will go anywhere if someone without a home needs my help". In identifying with his Korean mission, Brennan adopted the Korean name Ahn Gwang-hoon. In 2014, he was awarded the Asan Foundation Grand Peace Prize, worth ₩300 million, which he used to further his work.

Brennan was granted Korean citizenship in 2020, and in 2022 he published his autobiography, Of Saints and Sinners: A Lighthearted Look at a Life.

Brennan died in Seoul on 21 March 2026.
