= Alan C. Swedlund =

- Born: January 21, 1943 (age 83); Sacramento, California
- Education: University of Colorado Boulder
- Scientific career
- Fields: Anthropology; Biocultural anthropology
- Workplaces: University of Massachusetts Amherst

Alan C. Swedlund (born January 21, 1943) is a biological anthropologist and Emeritus Professor at the University of Massachusetts Amherst. Early in his career he was an assistant professor at Prescott College, Prescott, AZ. His research focuses primarily on the history of the human population, and on health and disease. He is the author of Shadows in the Valley: A cultural history of Illness, Death and Loss in New England, 1840-1916.

== Early life and education ==
Swedlund was born in Sacramento, CA and grew up in Colorado. He received his B.A. and Ph.D. from the University of Colorado Boulder.

== Career ==
Swedlund was hired as assistant professor at the University of Massachusetts Amherst in 1974 and joined George Armelagos in developing a curriculum and Ph.D. degree in biological anthropology. Swedlund served as Chair of the Department of Anthropology from 1990 to 1995, completed his academic career at the University of Massachusetts Amherst, and is Professor Emeritus in the department.
