= Kathleen O'Grady =

Canadian author and academic

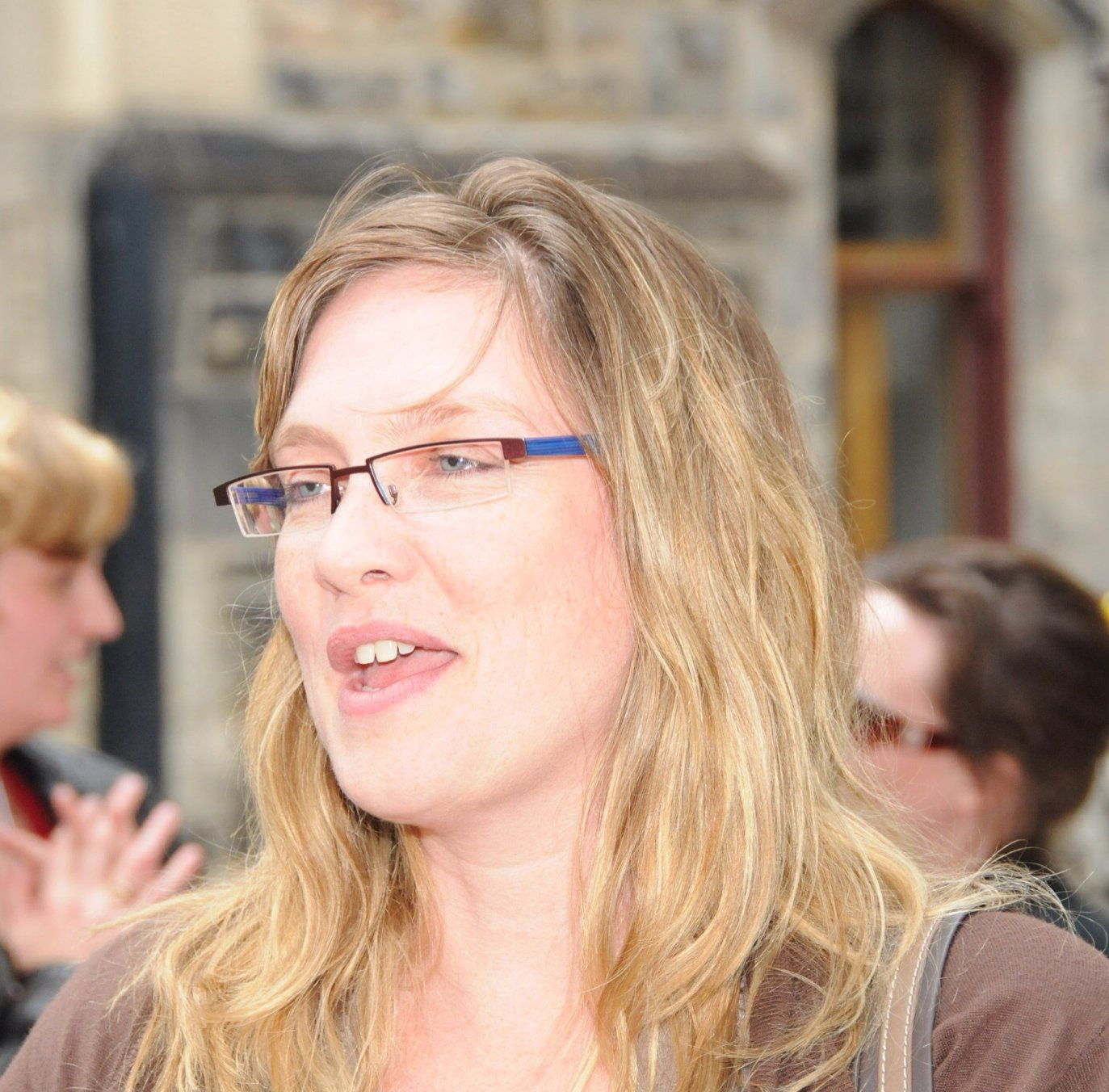
- O'Grady at Parliament Hill, East Block, September 2010
- Born: 1967 (age 58–59); Ontario, Canada
- Education: Wilfrid Laurier University (Canada); Cambridge University (UK
- Occupations: Writer, Academic
- Writing career
- Period: 1990s to present
- Genres: Nonfiction, adolescent literature, children's literature
- Notable works: Religion in French Feminist Thought; French Feminists on Religion; Bodies, Lives, Voices: Gender in Theology; Sweet Secrets: Stories of Menstruation; First Words: Patti Kay's Dreamworks
- Website: kathleenogrady.com

Kathleen O'Grady is a Canadian author and academic. She has published two children's books, but is more widely known as a feminist scholar who investigates women's health issues through a cultural lens and whose work addresses the under-researched intersection between feminism and the study of religion. She is also a past Editor of Network, the national, bilingual health magazine for Canadian women, and has published several books addressing feminist theory and methodology.

O'Grady is currently a research associate at the Simone de Beauvoir Institute, Concordia University, Montréal, Québec.

== Publications ==
O’Grady is the author of several journal and book articles and the co-editor of several books that document the influence of feminist theory in contemporary religious studies. Professor Pamela Sue Anderson of Oxford University has written that O’Grady is "a stellar scholar on French thinking, who writes brilliantly, with subtle, sophisticated and insightful prose about Kristeva, religion and feminism."

O'Grady's co-edited collection of major French feminist writings on religion, French Feminists on Religion: A Reader (Routledge), was the first representative selection of important writings by French-language feminist thinkers writing on the topic of religion, including the most influential and provocative texts on the subject from Luce Irigaray, Julia Kristeva, Hélène Cixous, Monique Wittig and Catherine Clément.

Her co-edited companion volume, Religion in French Feminist Thought: Critical Perspectives (Routledge), brings together some of the leading modern theological and religious responses to this body of work, and illustrates the ways in which French-language feminist thought has become a valuable tool in feminist efforts to rethink religion.

Her co-edited volume, Bodies, Lives, Voices: Gender in Theology (Sheffield), along with several journal and book articles on the topic of women and religion, profile the important ways in which feminist thinkers are enriching and transforming traditional representations of women's religious lives.

O’Grady is also an important figure in the women's health community, having been editor of the Canadian bilingual (French-English) women's health magazine, Network (2002–2008), and having published numerous academic and mainstream press articles on topics related to women's sexual health, including writings on menstruation and menopause from a cross-cultural perspective, critical articles on hormone replacement therapy (HRT) and menstrual suppression drugs.

She also co-authored Sweet Secrets: Stories of Menstruation, a nonfiction book for adolescent girls that documents, through interviews and nonfiction short-stories, the many and varied lived experiences of first menstruation (menarche).

Additionally, O’Grady has published a fictional children's book, First Words: Patti Kay’s Dreamworks. O’Grady's other contributions on cultural issues have appeared widely in the mainstream press.

== Education ==
O’Grady was educated in the field of religion from a cultural studies perspective at Wilfrid Laurier University, Waterloo, Canada and the University of Cambridge (Trinity College), United Kingdom. She has lectured in the Department of Religious Studies at the University of Calgary (Canada) and Wilfrid Laurier University, and given numerous guest lectures internationally. She is a Cambridge Commonwealth Scholar and a former Bank of Montréal Visiting Scholar at the University of Ottawa (Canada).

== See also ==
- Feminism
- Feminism in Canada
- Feminism in France
