= COVID-19 pandemic in Toronto =

Ongoing COVID-19 viral pandemic in Toronto, Canada

- Disease: COVID-19
- Pathogen: SARS-CoV-2
- Location: Toronto, Ontario, Canada
- First outbreak: Wuhan, Hubei, China
- Index case: Sunnybrook Hospital, Toronto
- Arrival date: January 22, 2020 (6 years, 9 months and 4 weeks)
- Confirmed cases: 211,585
- Active cases: 26,934
- Recovered: 186,759
- Deaths: 3,733
- Fatality rate: 1.76%
- Vaccinations: 2,656,825 (82.2%) (people with at least one dose); 2,429,541 (77.1%) (fully vaccinated people)

Government website
- Toronto Public Health

The COVID-19 pandemic in Toronto was a viral pandemic of coronavirus disease 2019 (COVID-19), a novel infectious disease caused by severe acute respiratory syndrome coronavirus 2 (SARS-CoV-2), localized in Toronto. Toronto is the most populous city in Canada, and the fourth most populous city in North America.

On January 23, 2020, the first identified case of COVID-19 in Canada during the pandemic was admitted to Sunnybrook Health Sciences Centre in Toronto. The individual was first described as showing fever and respiratory symptoms, however this was later confirmed as a presumptive positive case of COVID-19 on January 25, 2020. On March 17, 2020, the government of Ontario declared its first state of emergency during the pandemic, followed by Toronto mayor John Tory declaring a local state of emergency March 23, 2020. Initial restrictions preventing essential businesses from operating (such as the closure of indoor dining and personal care services) continued through until June 24, 2020, when the government of Ontario allowed Toronto to enter Stage 2 of reopening. Toronto introduced mask requirements at all public indoor settings on July 7, 2020. On July 31, 2020, Toronto was admitted into Stage 3 of reopening.

During the summer of 2020, the city saw a significant decline of new cases, where the city had as low as 246 active cases at one point that August. Along with the province of Ontario and other areas of Canada, cases began to steadily rise in late summer and early autumn. Toronto, Peel Region, York Region and Ottawa began to face restrictions based on rising viral spread and were initially knocked back into a modified Stage 2 tier until the province introduced a new colour-coded Response Framework for the province involving five tiers based on regional COVID-19 numbers. In early October 2020, Toronto Public Health became so overwhelmed by new cases, it suspended extended contact tracing efforts. On November 23, 2020, Toronto was placed under lockdown, under which it remained until the province declared a province-wide shutdown beginning December 26, 2020. This included the declaration of a second state of emergency in January 2021 and stay-at-home orders for the entire province. Toronto remained under stay-at-home orders until March 8, 2021. On April 3, 2021, following an uptick in new cases in Ontario, (exacerbated by more aggressive variants of SARS-CoV-2) Toronto, along with the rest of the province entered a shutdown coupled with a stay-at-home order that lasted until June 2, 2021.

In December 2020, Health Canada approved the Pfizer–BioNTech COVID-19 vaccine and the mRNA-1273 vaccine developed by Moderna. Widespread plans for COVID-19 vaccinations across Canada and the province began during the week of December 14, 2020. On February 26, 2021, Health Canada approved the Oxford–AstraZeneca COVID-19 vaccine for use and on March 5, 2021, the Janssen COVID-19 vaccine was also approved. In conjunction with the Provincial rollout, the city has opened ten mass-vaccination sites across the city, with hospital and hospital-run vaccination sites, pop-up clinics, mobile clinics, pharmacies and family doctors participating in the administration of the approved vaccines.

On May 9, 2022, Mayor John Tory announced the termination of Toronto's COVID-19 state of emergency after being in effect for 777 consecutive days, the longest for any major city in the world.

== Timeline ==
=== 2020 ===
==== January ====
On January 23, the first presumptive case in Canada was admitted to Sunnybrook Health Sciences Centre in Toronto and placed into a negative pressure chamber. The patient, a male in his 50s who travelled between Wuhan and Guangzhou before returning to Toronto on January 22, contacted emergency services following rapid onset symptoms. The presumption of infection in the patient was made after a rapid test was done at Public Health Ontario's Toronto laboratory, and was announced on January 25. Final testing conducted at the National Microbiology Laboratory in Winnipeg, Manitoba confirmed the presumptive case on January 27. Authorities said that the patient was experiencing respiratory problems but was in stable condition. His condition later improved and he was released from hospital on January 31.

On January 27, the Chief Medical Officer of Health of Ontario announced the man's wife as the second presumptive case. Officials reported that she was in good condition and that she was asymptomatic.

==== February ====
On February 24, Toronto's third and Ontario's fourth case of COVID-19 was confirmed after a woman tested positive following travel to Wuhan.

==== March ====
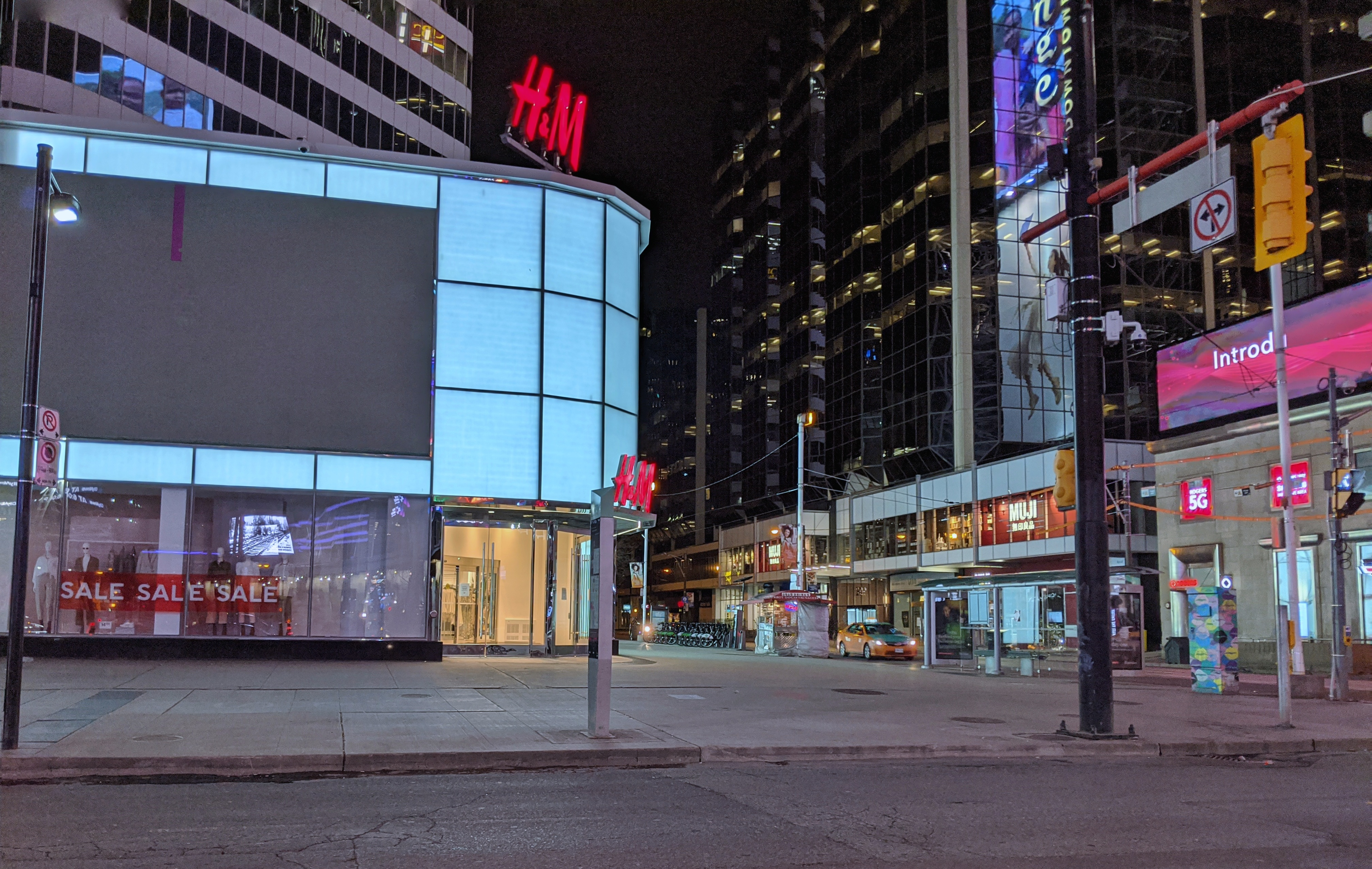
The typically busy Yonge–Dundas Square (now Sankofa Square) on March 20.

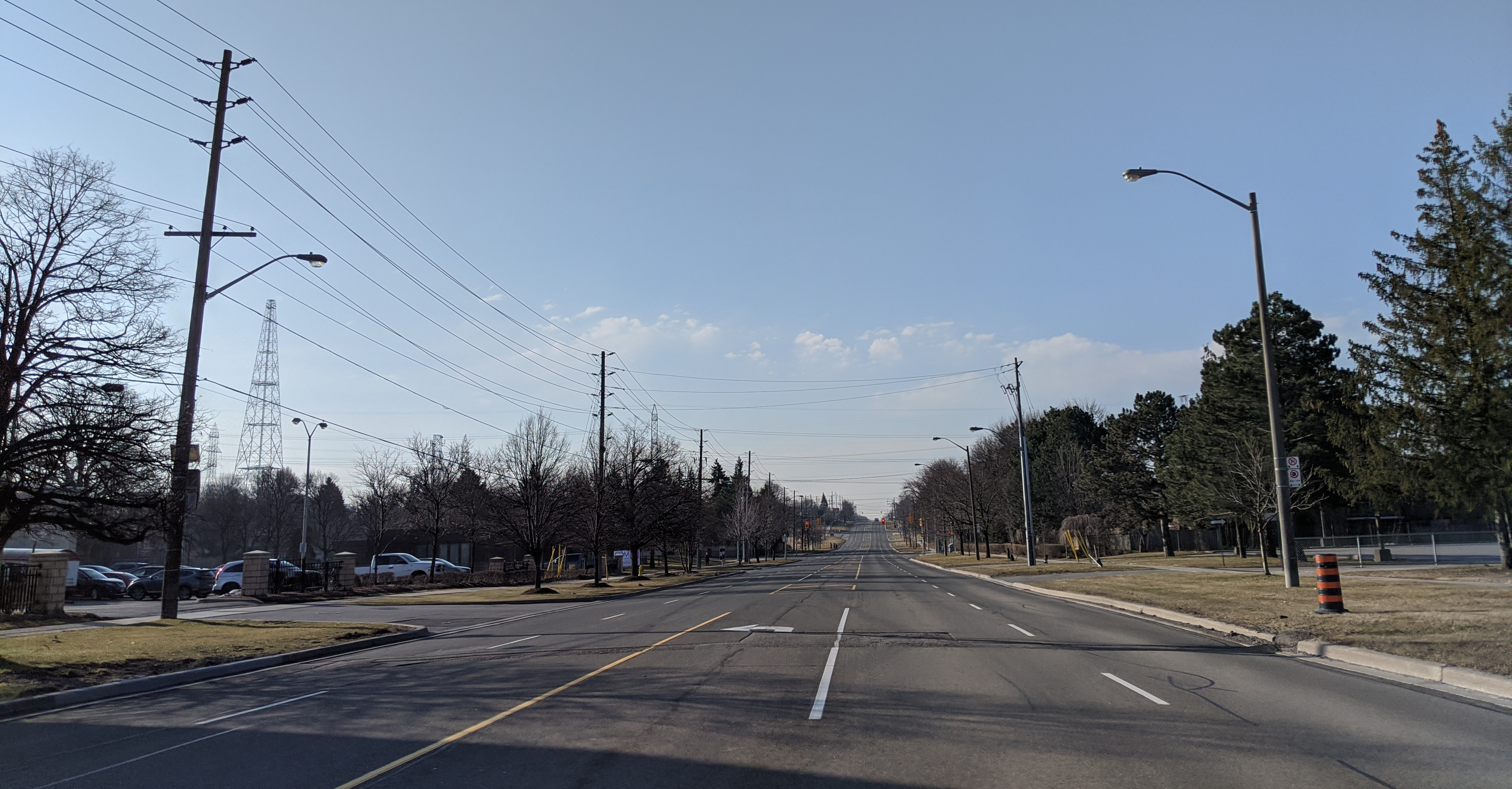
Leslie Street, an arterial road, during the morning rush hour in March.

On March 5, more cases in Ontario continued to emerge, including a Toronto man who presented himself to Sunnybrook Hospital and tested positive following travel to Iran.

On March 12, 17 new cases were confirmed including a baby boy who had recently visited the North York General Hospital in the former city of North York. That day, the total number of cases in Ontario increased to 59.

From the initial case on January 23 to March 18, over half of the reported cases in the province of Ontario were reported in Toronto.

On March 13, York University, Toronto Metropolitan University (then known as Ryerson University), and the University of Toronto announced the cancellation of in-person lessons, with classes moved online.

==== April–May ====
By May 4, 2020, outbreaks on four different inpatient units were declared at Toronto Western Hospital. The first was declared on April 18 while three others were declared on April 30. On May 10, another outbreak was declared on another floor at the hospital. While the term outbreak differs in definition by hospital, Toronto Western Hospital defines it as the confirmation of one positive patient per unit. On May 13, the hospital's emergency department declared an outbreak after five of its staff tested positive.

On Saturday, May 23, 2020, due to warmer weather, estimates of up to 10,000 mostly young people gathered in Trinity Bellwoods Park. Public outrage ensued as well as condemnation from Premier Ford and Toronto's medical officer of health Eileen de Villa. After making a tour of the city's parks and speaking with citizens, Mayor John Tory was criticized for lack of social distancing and improperly wearing a mask. He publicly apologized for his actions to following day. No social distancing fines were placed, however, there were several issued for public urination. Police presence was increased the following day to prevent any subsequent large gatherings. The following week, 'social distancing circles' were painted on the lawn in the park modelled after similar tactics used in San Francisco and New York City.

On May 27, the Province announced they would be taking over five long-term care homes following a scathing report by the Canadian Armed Forces citing neglect and abuse. Three of the five long-term care homes are in Toronto: Eatonville Care Centre, Hawthorne Place Care Centre and Altamont Care Community.

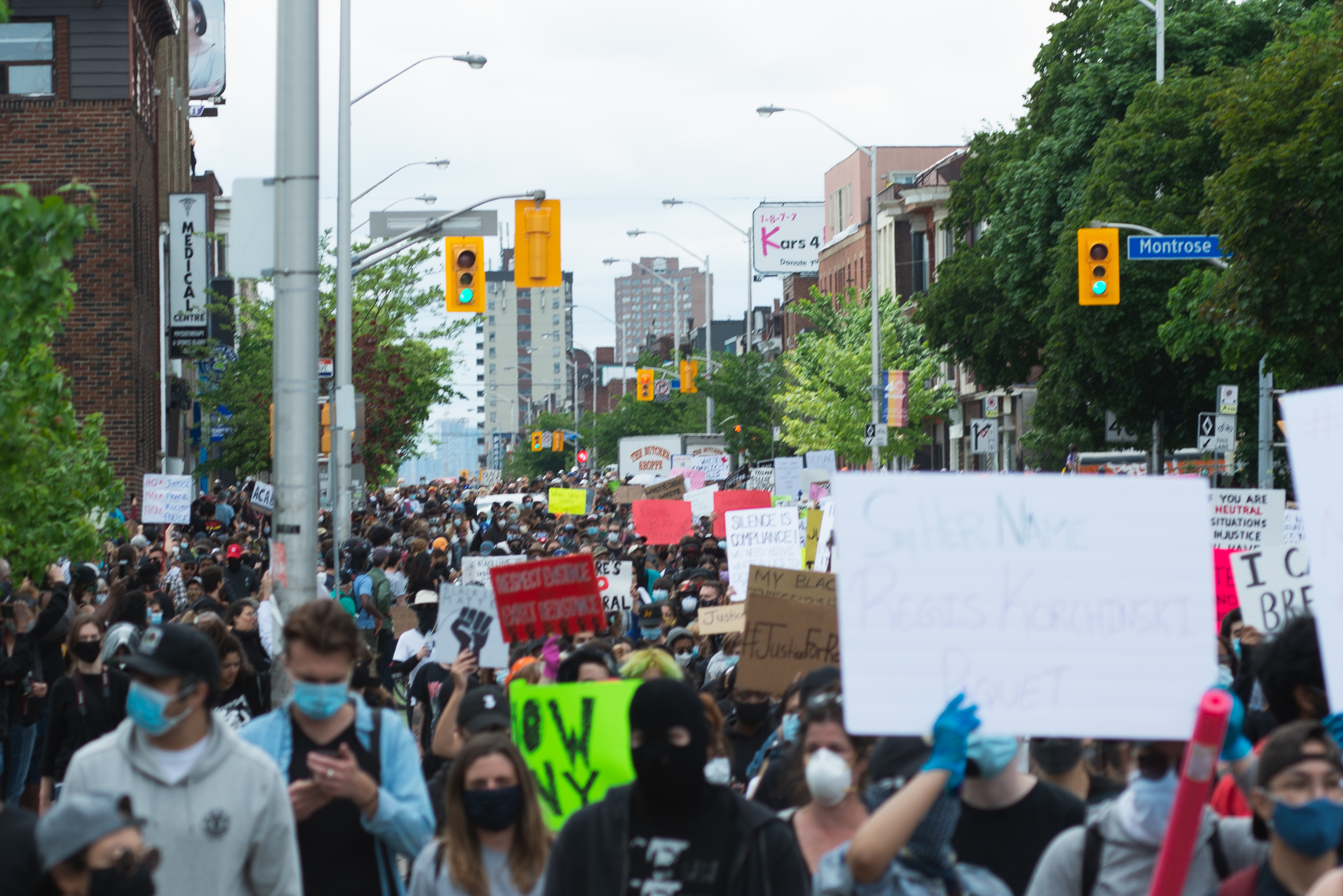
Regis Korchinski-Paquet protest in Toronto on May 30.

Despite social distancing policies, on May 30, estimates of up to 4,000 protesters gathered over the death of Regis Korchinski-Paquet, as well as congruent and concurrent protests in the United States and Canada following the murder of George Floyd. Protesters were encouraged to engage in social distancing and to wear face masks by Mayor Tory and Police Chief Mark Saunders. Early reports suggested most did wear face masks.

==== June ====
On June 1, the city announced two phases for re-opening park washrooms with the first phase re-opening about 50 washroom sites by June 6 and the remaining by mid-June. The Toronto Police Service had issued several tickets at Trinity Bellwoods Park on May 23 after reports of public urination.

On June 5, the city told restaurants to begin preparing for reopening, with no date set, under strict guidelines. Dining room capacities would be reduced by 50 percent, tables cannot seat more than six people and staff will all be required to maintain a six-foot distance at all times from each other. The city released an extensive list of reopening guidelines. Premier Ford, Mayor Tory and Dr. de Villa suggest that outdoor patios will most likely see a reopening before indoor dining areas.

Again, despite social-distancing orders banning gatherings of more than five people (part of emergency orders by the province extended on June 2) thousands gathered in protests against racism on the weekend of June 5–7. Not Another Black Life, the organizers of the original protest one week before did not claim involvement and instead asked protesters who had participated in the original march to get tested for COVID-19 and self-isolate for two weeks.

In early June, the city announced the CafeTO program, aimed at expanding the patio area of restaurants and bars with patio licenses when allowed to reopen. On June 8, the province echoed these sentiments suggesting they would be eliminating 'bureaucratic red tape' to assist in these patio extensions.

On June 8, Premier Ford announced to beginning of rolling out initiation of Stage 2 of reopening. Gatherings of ten people or less are now allowed in the whole province. However the general Stage 2 approach would be done regionally and therefore Toronto and other areas in the GTA are excluded and will enter Stage 2 at a later date.

On June 9, city councillor Michael Ford (nephew of Ontario Premier Doug Ford) became the first city councillor to test positive for COVID-19. On June 11, 26-year-old Ford was briefly admitted to hospital.

On June 15, as another round of regions were allowed to move into Stage 2, Toronto, Peel and Windsor-Essex were still disallowed from moving forward.

On June 16, the Canadian Armed Forces, sent to help the troubled Eatonville Care Centre officially left the long-term care home. The home was declared 'COVID-19 free' by the home's executive director. The home saw at least 43 deaths, and 138 cases amongst residents and 106 cases amongst staff. All residents have recovered and all but one staff member have recovered.

By June 18, the city of Toronto had confirmed at least 1000 deaths related to COVID-19.

On June 19, the city announced that it will resume issuing marriage licenses from June 22 at the North York Civic Centre. The East York, Etobicoke, Scarborough, and York Civic Centres along with Metro Hall and Toronto City Hall service counters remain closed.

On June 22, the province allowed Toronto to move forward to Stage 2 of reopening, beginning 12:01 am on Wednesday, June 24.

At 12:01 am, some bars and restaurants opened Wednesday morning for a short time. On June 24, Mayor Tory announced ferry service will resume to the Toronto Islands on June 27, which had been closed to non-residents since the beginning of the pandemic. Riders of the ferries will be required to wear face coverings.

==== July ====
Beginning after Canada Day, street parking enforcement, as well as fare evasion enforcement, will return to Toronto and the Toronto Transit Commission respectively. Beginning July 2, face masks or face coverings will be required to be worn on the TTC.

Beginning July 7, face masks or face coverings will be required in enclosed, public places by law in the city of Toronto.

On July 29, the Ontario government announced Toronto was allowed to enter Stage 3 of reopening on July 31 at 12:01 am.

==== August ====
On August 10, 2020, Toronto Public Health considered its four pandemic control indicators to be in the "green" for the first time. This analysis includes statuses on viral trends, access to personal protective equipment (PPE), laboratory testing and health system capacity.

==== September ====
Amid back-to-school reopening plans debated at a provincial level, the Toronto District School Board decided to push back the start of school to September 15, 2020, and to have mandatory mask rules for students.

On September 11, the Federal government announced $13.9 million in funding to create a voluntary isolation facility in Toronto. The facility is to be a rented-out hotel that is aimed at COVID-19 patients who cannot safely self-isolate from family members and roommates.

On September 17, in response to growing provincial numbers, the Ontario government announced a reduction of social gathering size limits to 10 people indoors and 25 people outdoors in Toronto, Peel Region and Ottawa. Fines would be set at a minimum of $10,000 for the host and $750 for each participant involved in an illegal gathering. Most businesses, facilities, places of worship and events already practicing social distancing and face-covering protocols would be largely unaffected by the new rules.

On September 23, Mayor Tory stated that the city would extend its cancellation of all city-led and city-permitted outdoor special events through at least the end of 2020.

On September 25, the Ontario government announced that all bars, restaurants and nightclubs province-wide, effective September 26 would have an 11 pm last call and have to be completely closed by midnight. Additionally, all strip clubs would be closed indefinitely.

On September 26, Toronto Public Health ordered three King Street bars and restaurants closed due to non-compliance of COVID-19 protocols including serving buffet-style food and being uncooperative with investigators. The three establishments are MARBL, King Taps and Casa Mezcal.

On September 30, Toronto City Council approved further restrictions on bars and restaurants in the city. The restrictions include a reduction of capacity from 100 to 75 patrons indoors, a reduction of table seating from ten people to six and a limitation on the loudness of background music or sounds played in the establishment. The new bylaw restrictions went into effect on October 8.

==== October ====
On October 2, Dr. Eileen de Villa recommended large closures in order to control the spread of the virus, especially relating to indoor dining in bars and restaurants. She announced that 44 percent of outbreaks in the city of Toronto were in bars and restaurants.

According to a report by The Globe and Mail, Toronto Public Health on October 2 decided to suspend contact tracing efforts due to an overwhelming number of new cases.

On October 10, indoor dining in bars and restaurants was ordered closed along with the complete closure of gyms, movie theatres and casinos for 28 days by the provincial government in Toronto, Peel and Ottawa. The measures followed a continued uptick in new cases in hotspots in the province of Ontario.

On October 19, outbreaks were announced at St. Joseph's Health Centre and Toronto Western Hospital. On the same day, Ontario and Toronto government representatives recommended against trick-or-treating for Halloween.

==== November ====
On November 3, the province unveiled a new colour-coded level system for individual public health units within the province, with Toronto proposed to moving to the Orange-level category. Toronto will be moved from its current restriction level on November 14.

On November 10, Toronto saw a record number of new infections with 533 new cases in 24 hours. On the same day, it was announced Toronto would be moving to Red-level on November 14. The city enacted further, more stringent restrictions on top of the colour-code level. Indoor dining will remain closed for a minimum of 28 days, indoor fitness classes are banned, Gyms can reopen with a maximum of 10 people. Meeting, event spaces, casinos, bingo halls will remain closed. Indoor movie theatres are to remain closed as per Red-level guidelines.

On November 20, Premier Ford announced Toronto and Peel would be placed on lockdown category according to the new response framework, effective November 23. Bars and restaurants would be restricted to take-out only, no private gatherings outside of one's household, cinemas and casinos remain closed, and all gyms must close. Non-essential retail will be shuttered, with curb-side pickup allowed, and sports and recreation activities must cease. The film and television industry can remain open under Control (red) level restrictions. Schools and childcare would remain open while post-secondary education would move into virtual learning (with exceptions for those that require in-person training).

On November 24, in defiance of provincial orders, Adam Skelly, owner and operator of Adamson Barbecue opened his Etobicoke restaurant for indoor dining, currently disallowed under Lockdown orders. The previous day, Skelly had posted on social media informing his followers about the event. By the end of the day, Toronto Public Health had ordered the closure of the restaurant. On November 25, Skelly once again opened his restaurant, inciting further charges against him. Protesters gathered, including members protesting against the lockdown. Before the morning of the 26th of November, Toronto Police Service moved to change the locks on his establishment, when Skelly managed to enter the building, and attempted to open his restaurant a third day. Skelly was then arrested for attempting to obstruct police officers. Skelly was released on a $50,000 bail the following morning and required to stay 200 metres (660 ft) away from his businesses and to abstain from using social media. He faces more than 13 charges. Neighbours of Adamson, like Great Lakes Brewery, were vocally against Skelly's protests and antics and complained that the police traffic affected their business. The owner argued that although business is affected by COVID-19 in the food and beverage industry, the restrictions are for the greater good.

==== December ====
On December 9, Health Canada approved the Pfizer–BioNTech COVID-19 vaccine for use in Canada. The first doses of the vaccine in Ontario were administered to healthcare workers in the University Health Network in Toronto and The Ottawa Hospital in Ottawa beginning December 14.

In an effort to discourage gatherings on the holiday, Metrolinx (which operates GO Transit and Union Pearson Express) and the TTC announced the same day that they would not offer extended or free evening or overnight transit on New Year's Eve as they have done in past years.

On December 14, as the first tranche of COVID-19 vaccines arrived, vaccinations began nationwide. Anita Quidangen, a Personal Support Worker from Toronto became the first person in Canada to receive a dose.

On December 16, Toronto reported a record number of daily new cases with 850.

=== 2021 ===
==== January ====
On January 4, the City of Toronto announced they would be providing the public new data on workplace outbreaks of the virus. On January 8, UHN had announced the hospital system had run out of vaccines and had to wait until a shipment the following Monday.

On January 5, the Toronto St. Patrick's Day Parade announced that it has been cancelled for the second year in a row, as the suspension of city-led and city-permitted major outdoor events has been extended through March 31, 2021. On January 15, the city announced that it had completed the vaccination of all long-term care residents and staff in Toronto; On January 18, the city's first mass vaccination clinic opened in the Metro Toronto Convention Centre. The clinic was closed the next day due to shortages of vaccines caused by a manufacturing delay by Pfizer.

On January 21, Toronto officials noted the basic reproduction number (R number) had dipped below 1 for the first time in months, which would theoretically reduce the exponential spread of the virus.

==== February ====
On February 19, Premier Ford announced that pursuant to "the advice of local health officials and the Chief Medical Officer of Health", Toronto, Peel and North Bay would remain under the provincial stay-at-home order until at least March 8, and will not re-enter the response framework.

On February 24, the city announced that city-led and city-permitted major outdoor events would be cancelled through July 1, 2021 (Canada Day). This has resulted in the cancellation of multiple events for the second year in a row.

As responsibility for vaccinations begin to shift from the Province to individual public health units, Toronto Public Health announced February 28 that they would begin vaccinating people experiencing homelessness in the shelter system.

==== March ====
On March 1, it was announced that 350 sites for mass-vaccination efforts are being prepared.

On March 5, the Ontario government announced Toronto would leave stay-at-home orders in place since January on March 8 and move into "lockdown (grey)" zone once again in the provincial response framework.

==== April ====
Following an uptick in cases and hospitalizations, on April 3 Premier Ford declared a state of emergency, and all regions of Ontario were placed under a second provincewide shutdown.

On April 6, Medical Officer of Health Eileen de Villa ordered all Toronto schools closed from April 7 through April 19, under an order issued pursuant to Section 22 of the provincial Health Protection and Promotion Act. On April 7, Premier Ford would be upgraded to a second stay-at-home order. On April 12, all Ontario schools were ordered closed indefinitely.

On April 20, a second Section 22 order was issued by Toronto Public Health effective April 23, requiring all non-critical businesses tied to at least five positive cases within the past 14 days to close for 10 days, with all employees required to self-isolate for the duration.

Following criticism of the provincial government's rollout of vaccines, on April 28, the city partnered with Vaccine Hunters Canada to help distribute appointment availability information via its social media outlets.

==== May ====
On May 14, "to continue to slow the spread of COVID-19 and help provide predictability to major event organizers", all city-led and city-permitted major outdoor events were cancelled through September 6, 2021, including the annual Canadian National Exhibition. Many of these annual events resumed in 2022.

==== July ====
A preprint study from epidemiologists at the University of Toronto, David Fisman and Ashleigh Tuite, found that the Delta variant had a 120 percent greater risk of hospitalization, 287% greater risk of ICU admission and 137% greater risk of death compared to non-variant of concern strains of SARS-COV-2.

=== 2022 ===
==== May ====
On May 9, Mayor John Tory announced the termination of Toronto's COVID-19 state of emergency after being in effect for 777 days.

== Government response ==
Sign posted at Toronto parks.

Toronto previously had experience with an infectious disease crisis during the 2003 SARS outbreak. This is claimed to have helped healthcare providers, hospitals and public health prepare for another epidemic. The handling of the COVID-19 pandemic by the province demonstrated that many of the protocols and recommendations following the 2003 SARS outbreak were not effectively implemented or executed.

Toronto Mayor John Tory announced a local state of emergency on March 23, 2020. On March 25, 2020, Mayor Tory announced the closure of park amenities, including playgrounds and tennis courts in the city. High Park was closed from April 30 to May 10 to prevent mass gatherings of people to view the blooming cherry blossoms.

Toronto has cancelled all city-led and city-permitted major outdoor events through at September 6, 2021.

Effective from May to October 2020, Toronto classified certain roads as Quiet Streets and implemented weekend road closures as part of the ActiveTO program to promote outdoor activity with enough space for physical distancing.

On June 30, 2020, city council voted to make masks or face coverings mandatory in enclosed public spaces.

In late July 2020, in anticipation of moving to Stage 3, city council made proposals to impose stronger safety measures compared to other Ontario regions.

In November 2020, Toronto launched a Practice Safe 6ix public education campaign targeted at 18–40-year-old residents who might be "experiencing COVID-19 fatigue and who may have lost the sense of pandemic urgency."

=== Vaccination ===
==== Timeline of vaccination in Toronto ====
Vaccinations started in Ontario and the nation in Toronto on December 14, 2020, run by the province. Initially the province focused on vaccinations for long-term care home residents and staff.

On February 22, 2021, Premier Doug Ford announced it would be up to individual Public Health Units to develop their own vaccination plans.

In February 2021, the city announced the preparation of nine COVID-19 vaccination sites, to be ready when more vaccines are available to the general public. The locations include: Metro Toronto Convention Centre, Toronto Congress Centre, Malvern Community Recreation Centre, The Hangar, Scarborough Town Centre, Cloverdale Mall, Mitchell Field Community Centre, North Toronto Memorial Community Centre and Carmine Stefano Community Centre.

In March 2021, vaccinations in the city then pivoted toward opening up for adults aged 80+ for Pfizer-BioNTech and Moderna vaccines via hospitals and 60–64-year-olds who could sign up for vaccination via the Oxford-AstraZeneca vaccine through pharmacies, and later doctor's offices.

On June 27, 2021, a total of 26,771 doses of COVID-19 vaccines were administered in a clinic in Scotiabank Arena as part of the "Our Winning Shot" event held to encourage people to get vaccinated against COVID-19. This possibly set the world record at the time for the most COVID-19 vaccinations administered in one day in one clinic.

==== Data ====
Vaccination data in Toronto	#	Ref
Number of people with at least one dose	2,692,029	
Number of people with two doses	2,462,011	
Number of people who are fully vaccinated (received three doses of a vaccine)	1,233,784	
Percentage of Toronto population who has received at least one dose	83.3%	
Percentage of Toronto population who are fully vaccinated (received both doses of a vaccine)	78.3%	
Percentage of Toronto population who are fully vaccinated (received three doses of a vaccine)	38.2%	
Percentage of the eligible Toronto population who has received at least one dose	87.4%	
Percentage of the eligible Toronto population who are fully vaccinated (received both doses of a vaccine)	82.1%	
City-operated vaccination clinics open	5	

Data as of January 20, 2022

=== Criticism ===
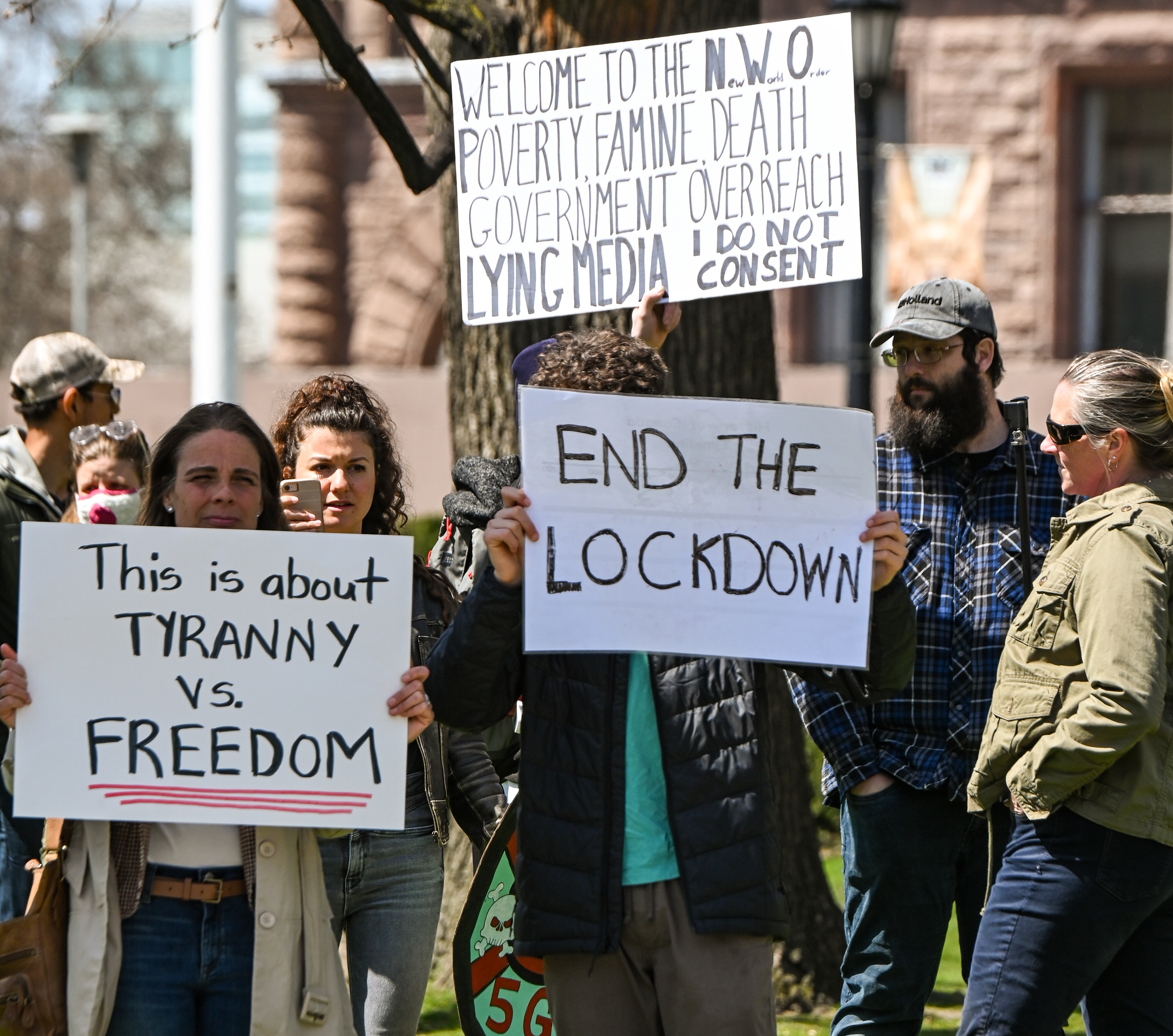
An anti-lockdown protest in front of the Ontario Legislative Building in Queen's Park, Toronto, April 25, 2020

== Impact ==
The Toronto Transit Commission saw a decrease of 86 percent in ridership by May 2020, with a monthly economic shortfall of CA$92 million and projected losses to culminate in $300 million by Labour Day.

Police reported an uptick in stunt driving, street racing and speeding due to emptied roads and highways. Toronto police confirmed they issued close to 3,000 speeding tickets between March 15, 2020, and March 31, 2020, an increase of 35 percent of normal ticketing. On May 9, 2020, an 18-year old driver was arrested by the Ontario Provincial Police having clocked 308 kilometres per hour (191 mph) on the Gardiner Expressway and Queen Elizabeth Way (QEW), the highest recorded speed in Ontario history.

Researchers in April 2020 warned physicians about the risks of overlooking the virus' impact on LGBT communities. Securing demographic data about COVID-19's effect on racial minorities in Toronto was also a priority.

=== Bars, restaurants and venues ===
With the initial government-ordered closure of bars and restaurants (except for takeout, drive-through and delivery services), many began to face steep financial woes and were forced to close permanently.

Later, restaurants were initially granted patio seating and later limited dine-in seating. However, coupled with decreased revenue and months of shut down along with insurance and rent increases, many restaurants, bars and live music venues are expected to shut down permanently in coming months.

Beginning October 10, 2020, provincial measures ordered the closure of indoor dining once again in the city of Toronto for a minimum of 28 days. Toronto was then placed in the Lockdown category of the provincial response framework beginning November 23, 2020.

More than 140 bars, restaurants and venues have closed over the course of the pandemic, part of a larger slew of closures across the country, estimated to be around 10,000.

==== Notable closures ====
- Mod Club Theatre
- Nando's (21 Canadian locations)
- Tucker's Marketplace (all Canadian locations)
- Fran's Restaurant (Yonge and Front location)
- Wayne Gretzky's

=== Retail ===
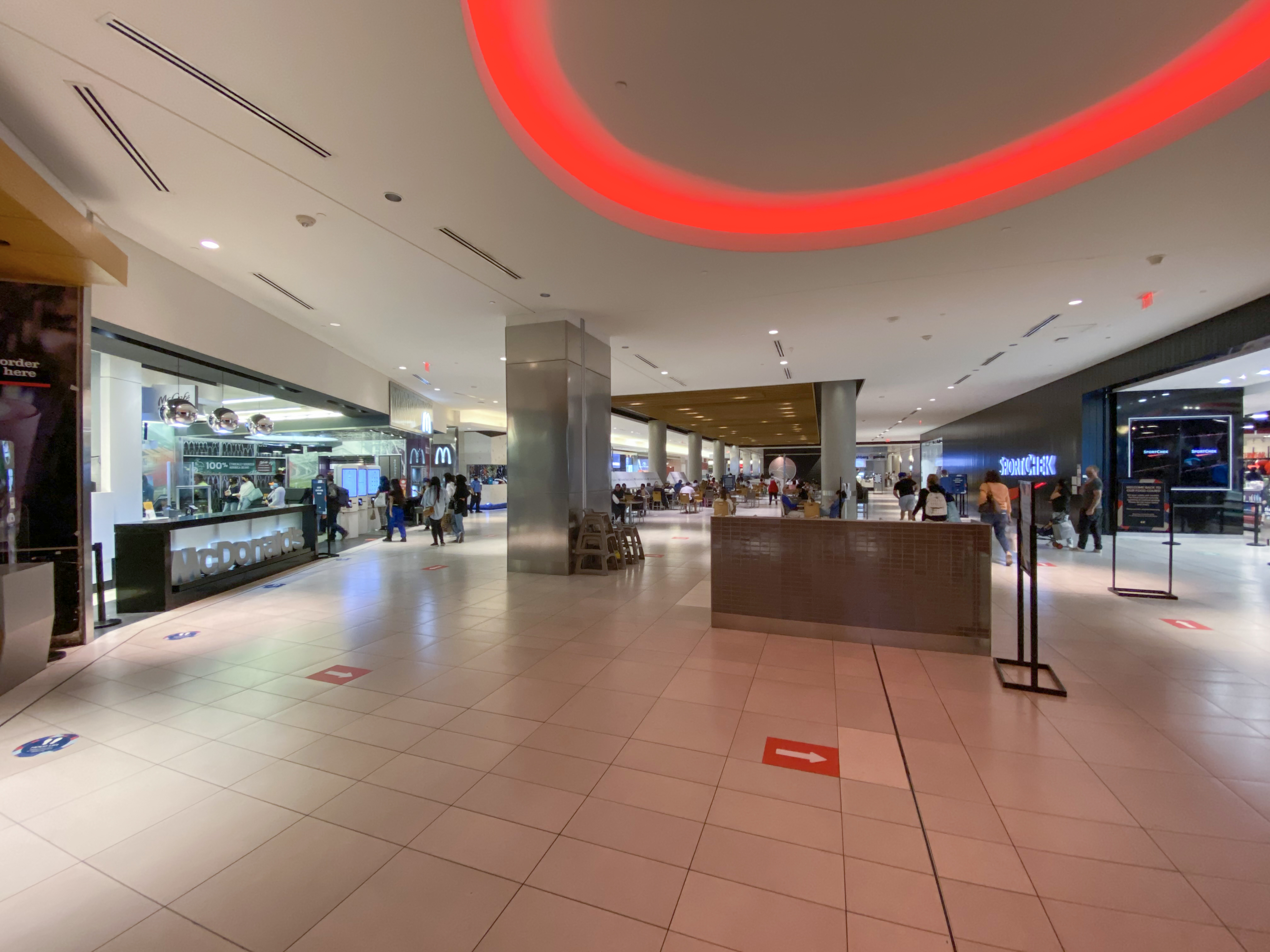
The Toronto Eaton Centre's Urban Eatery food court in 2021

Many retailers in Toronto closed early in the pandemic with some closing permanently as the pandemic coincides with the retail apocalypse that began a decade prior to the pandemic. Some shopping malls converted some vacant storefronts near existing food courts into additional food court space to allow social distancing.

=== Sports ===
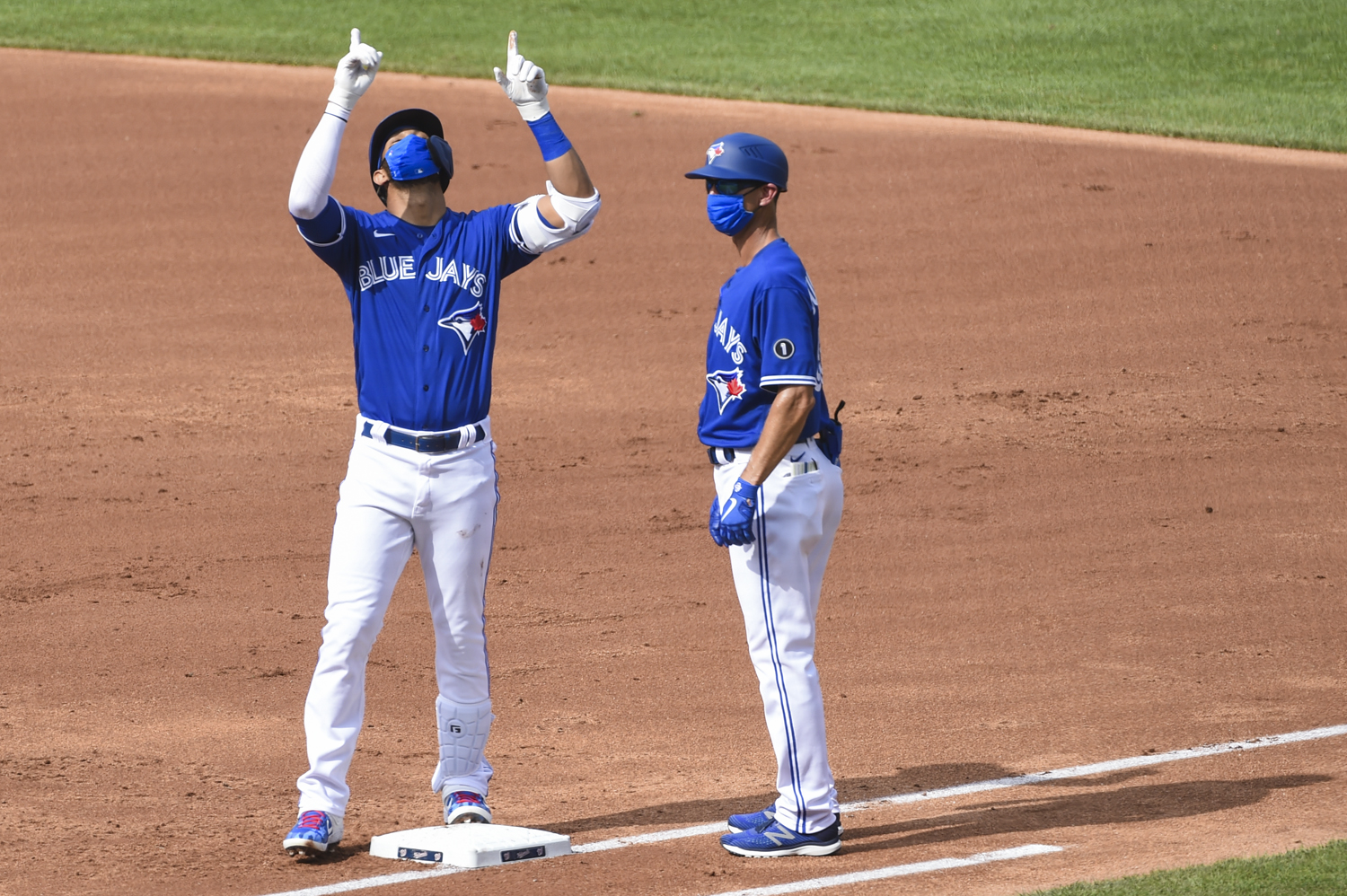
Toronto Blue Jays utility player Lourdes Gurriel Jr. (left) and first base coach Mark Budzinski (right) wearing face masks before a road game

Numerous Toronto-based professional sports teams played their home games in the United States to limit the spread of COVID-19 to Canada with the Toronto Blue Jays playing the majority of their home games in Sahlen Field in Buffalo, New York during the 2020 season and during June and July of the 2021 season, and the Toronto Raptors playing their home games in Amalie Arena in Tampa, Florida during the 2020–21 season. The Blue Jays announced on February 18, 2021, that they would play their April and May homestands of the 2021 Major League Baseball (MLB) season in Dunedin, Florida at their spring training facility of TD Ballpark. The Blue Jays and the Raptors are the sole Canadian teams in Major League Baseball and the National Basketball Association, respectively.

In hockey, Toronto (specifically Scotiabank Arena) was one of two host cities for the 2020 Stanley Cup playoffs, beginning August 2020, along with the Rogers Arena in Edmonton. Other cities in the United States were passed over based on worsening numbers of COVID-19. The Toronto Maple Leafs were eliminated in qualifying rounds against the Columbus Blue Jackets. During the 2021 season, the Leafs played against the other Canadian teams in the temporary North Division during the regular season to reduce travel across the border.

The Toronto Marathon, which was supposed to be held May 2020, was cancelled. Also scheduled for May 2020, the annual Sporting Life 10k moved from an in-person to virtual race. Both events have also been cancelled for 2021. Toronto Waterfront Marathon, scheduled for October 2020, was cancelled, with the race moving to a virtual format. These three events resumed in-person races in 2022.

The 2022 League of Legends World Championship was supposed to hold its semi-final matchups at Toronto's Scotiabank Arena. However, due to the pandemic's lingering effects impacting the acquisition of multi-entry visas, the semi-finals were moved to the State Farm Arena in Atlanta, Georgia, United States. Canada would later be awarded the 2025 Mid-Season Invitational (the secondary international tournament for the game), although Vancouver was given the right to host on 8 January 2025.

== Key people ==
- John Tory, Former Mayor of Toronto
- Eileen de Villa, physician and medical officer of health for the city
- Matthew Pegg, former Chief of Toronto Fire Services and General Manager of the Office of Emergency Management
- Joe Cressy, former city councillor and former chair of the Board of Health
- Doug Ford, Premier of Ontario

== See also ==
- COVID-19 pandemic in Canada
- COVID-19 pandemic in Ontario
- COVID-19 pandemic in Ottawa
- COVID-19 pandemic in the Regional Municipality of Peel
- COVID-19 pandemic in the Regional Municipality of York
- Toronto Accessibility Task Force on COVID-19
- Toronto Transit Commission incidents § COVID-19 pandemic: about the effect of the pandemic on Toronto Transit Commission (TTC) operations
- Toronto Public Health
