= Toronto Parks and Recreation Division =

Division of Toronto's municipal government

Division overview
- Type: Division
- Jurisdiction: City of Toronto
- Motto: A city within a park
- Employees: 5,450.3 (FTE; 2025)
- Annual budget: $598.9 million (2025)
- Division executives: Kate Bassil, Deputy City Manager, Community and Emergency Services; Terry Ricketts, General Manager, Parks and Recreation
- Website: Official website

Toronto Parks and Recreation (P&R) is a division of the City of Toronto which maintains the municipal park system and delivers community recreation programs at city-operated facilities.

P&R operates 1473 named parks, 839 sports fields, 137 community centres, and nearly 670 other recreation facilities. P&R employs over 5,000 permanent and temporary full-time and part-time, unionized and non-unionized staff, and is one of the city's largest services. The division's approved operating budget in 2025 is $598.9 million. Its 10-year capital from 2025 to 2034 totals $4.3 billion. In 2025, operating and capital spending accounts for 5,450.3 full-time equivalent (FTE) positions.

Prior to January 1, 2025, the division housed the Urban Forestry Branch and was known as Parks, Forestry and Recreation (PFR). As PFR, the division was also responsible for provision of urban forestry services and administration of urban forestry regulations for the 3 million trees in the city. The Urban Forestry Branch was transferred to the Environment, Climate and Forestry Division.

The division is led by a general manager, presently Tom Azouz who is acting the role, and reports to the deputy city manager, community and emergency services, presently Kate Bassil.

== History ==
=== 1884 to 1997 ===
In 1884, an administrative group named the Committee on Public Walks and Gardens was officially created to oversee the city's parks and green space. Before then, the city as a whole was responsible for them (namely then a large reserve public space south of Front Street from Yonge to Spadina) since the incorporation of Toronto in 1834. In the nineteenth century, the focus of the committee was on the maintenance of green space and the provision of walks and gardens; not much was addressed in terms of recreational activities or recreation facilities. In the early twentieth century, the social conditions of the city changed dramatically, and supervised recreational activities became a subject of interest. The twentieth century also marked the development of playgrounds around the city. In 1912, there were no playgrounds; by 1947 there were 121. Picnic and recreational facilities were also opened up around the city in the parks. In 1945, the department was given the responsibility to oversee the creation and maintenance of community centres. In 1947, the department was renamed as the Department of Parks and Recreation.

=== 1998 to 2004 ===
Former logo of the pre-amalgamated division in the pre-amalgamation City of Toronto.

Following the 1998 amalgamation of Toronto, the former department Metro Toronto Parks and Culture and merged with the counterpart department in each of the former municipalities to former the present department:

- Toronto Parks and Culture
- Scarborough Parks and Recreation
- North York Parks and Recreation
- Etobicoke Parks and Recreation
- East York Parks and Recreation
- City of York Parks and Recreation

=== 2005 to 2025 ===
In 2005, the Department of Parks and Recreation was split into the Parks, Forestry and Recreation Division and the Economic Development and Culture Division.

The division reports to a deputy city manager and with the new executive committee its role will be overseen by two councillors who are heads of city council standing committees:

- Chair of Parks and Environment Committee
- Chair of the Community Development and Recreation Committee

=== 2025 to present ===
From 2005 to 2025, the division housed the city's Urban Forestry Branch, and was known as Parks, Forestry & Recreation

On January 1, 2025, the Urban Forestry branch was transferred to the Environment, Climate and Forestry. The division name was reverted to Parks and Recreation.

The city noted that the transition better aligns the two divisions with corporate initiatives such as TransformTO, the city's net zero strategy, and plans to develop an updated vision for the renewed division which aligns with its "more streamlined scope of operations".

== Role ==
The Parks and Recreation Division is responsible for:

- public parks, parkettes and gardens (excluding Rouge Park, which is federally managed as a national park by Parks Canada, and those under the Toronto and Region Conservation Authority)
- beaches, including those on the Toronto Islands
- tree planting in parks and roadways;
- recreation facilities - swimming pools (not attached to schools), athletics fields, splash pads, community centres, tennis courts, skating arenas and rinks;
- horticulture and forestry programs, park and open space planning and other environmental initiatives;
- the development and delivery of recreation programs to all ages;
- facility management and maintenance;
- community development, parks, horticulture and forestry programs, park and open space planning and environmental initiatives;
- the operation of specialized services, including the Toronto Island ferries, golf courses, waterfront and regional parks systems;
- care for animals at High Park Zoo and Riverdale Farm

=== Vision ===
Parks and Recreation's vision is for Toronto to be known by the world as a “City within a Park”, a tapestry of parks, open spaces, rivers and streets that will connect their neighbourhoods and join them with their clean, vibrant lakefront.

== Organization and operation ==
The Parks and Recreation Division is organized into eight branches, each led by a director:

- Business and Technology Transformation
- Capital Projects Design and Delivery
- Client and Business Services
- Community Recreation
- Management Services
- Parks
- Parks Planning and Strategic Initiatives
- Policy and Strategic

=== Community Recreation ===
Community Recreation is responsible for providing recreational programming. It operates 137 community centres, 48 indoor ice pads, 64 outdoor ice pads, 65 indoor pools, and 59 outdoor pools. Most instructors and program staff are hired on a part-time basis. The branch has four service areas, community recreation, aquatics, customer service, and standards and innovation.

Internally, the branch organizes itself into five districts, modeled on the former municipalities: Etobicoke/York (West), North York (North), Scarborough (East), Toronto/East York (South), and West Toronto/York (split from Etobicoke/York and Toronto/East York in 2018).

==== Aquatics ====
Aquatics is part of Community Recreation and is responsible for the operation of the city's 65 indoor pools, 59 seasonal outdoor pools, 100 wading pools, 93 splash pads, the Kidstown water park, and providing aquatic instructional programs. P&R operates several Olympic sized swimming pools, including the Toronto Pan Am Sports Centre, and the Etobicoke Olympium. Instructional programs include the Learn to Swim program and Ultra levels, which were developed with the Lifesaving Society, SPLASH Swim Team, stroke improvement, junior lifeguard courses, and lifesaving courses including National Lifeguard certification. Leisure swim is offered free of charge at all pools operated by the division.

The city also employees lifeguards along the waterfront during the summer months. The waterfront supervision program was formerly under the Toronto police as the Toronto Police Lifeguard Service, but was transferred to PFR following a 2017 modernization initiative.

==== Fun guide ====
The division releases a semi-annual booklet called the FUN Guide, providing information on programs and services available for people of all ages. There is a booklet produced for each city district: Etobicoke York, North York, Scarborough, Toronto & East York, and West Toronto York. The booklet is organized by topics such as: Adapted/Integrated Services, Preschool, Registration, Arts, Camps, Fitness and Wellness, Jobs, Leadership, Older Adults, Permits, Skating, Ski & Snowboarding, Sports, Swimming, Youth, and Volunteers. Other recreational activities and services provided by the division are: camping facilities, community centres, cycling, discovery walks, golfing, and tennis.

==== Welcome Policy ====
The city offers a subsidy to help low income individuals and families access recreational programming, provided in the form of a credit on the city's "efun" system. As of 2018, the credit is $537 for children and youth, and $249 for adults and seniors.

=== Parks ===
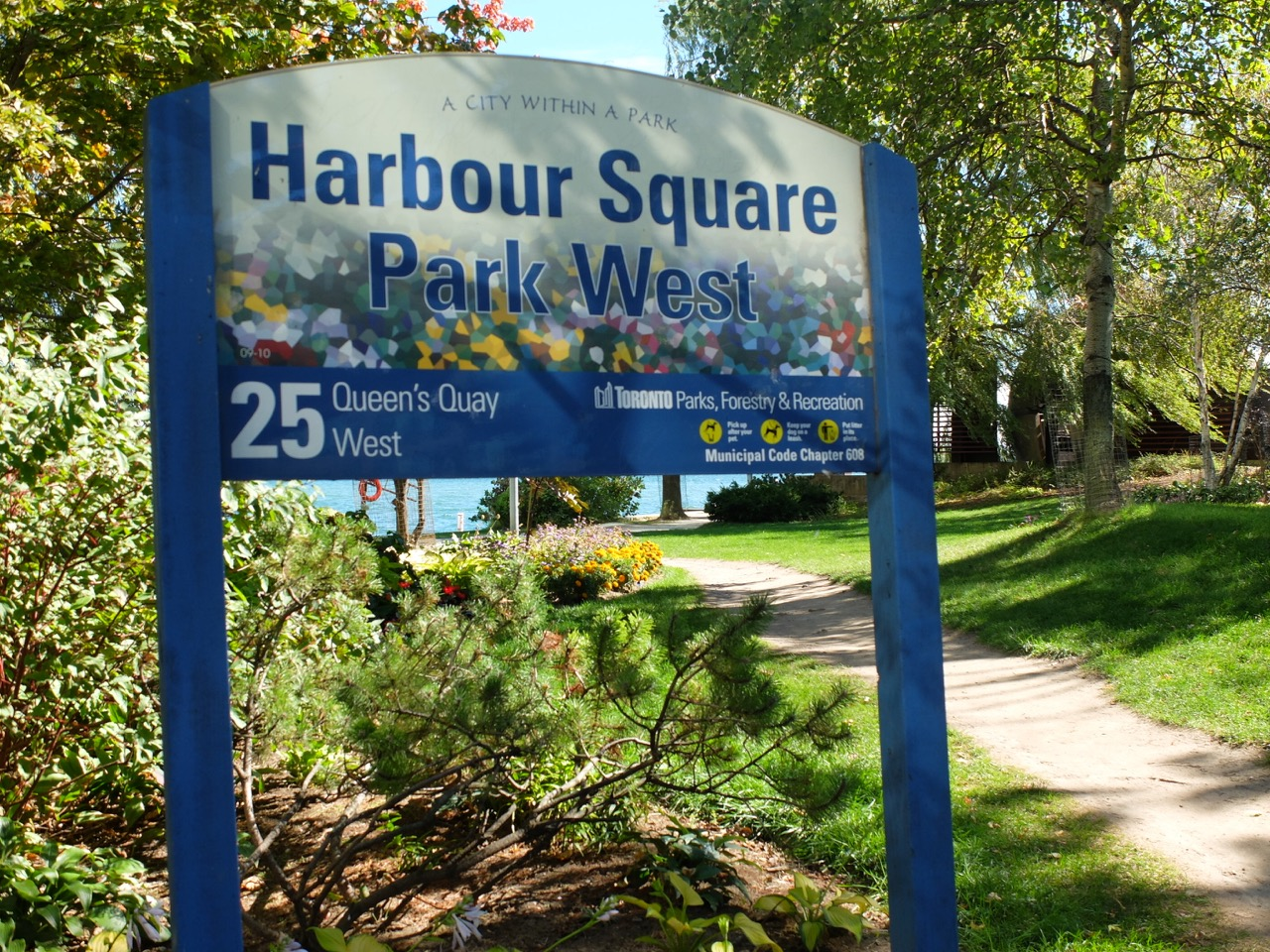
Harbour Square Park West is a park maintained by the division

Parks' responsibilities include the operation of approximately 1500 parks, providing ferry service to and from the Toronto Islands, managing the two animal farms and High Park Zoo, administrating the community gardens program, and providing plants for the city's gardens and conservatories. Public parks are governed by Toronto Municipal Code Chapter 608.

==== Parks Ambassadors program ====
In 2003, Parks introduced mobile outreach crews which aim to connect the homeless population in the parks system with agencies and other City divisions that provide support. The program conducts park visits and safety visits across the city.

==== Discovery Walks ====
A series of self-guided trails in various parks in the city along rivers, ravines and beaches that have cultural and historical significance:

- Toronto Belt Line Railway
- Garrison Creek
- Todmorden Mills
- The Beaches
- Old Mill, Toronto
- Don Valley Brick Works

=== Former branches and operation ===
==== Urban Forestry ====
Urban Forestry is responsible for maintaining the city's urban forest protecting trees and maintaining tree health, and the enforcement and implementation of by-laws, and city policies pertaining to forestry and trees. Trees are governed by Toronto Municipal Code Chapter 813.

The division reports to a deputy city manager, and is led by a general manager. PFR is divided into:

- six branches, each led by a director;
- various sections responsible for their branches operations in a geographic area of the city, or a specific service area, led by a manager;
- sections are further subdivided into regions of the city, or other operations, led by a supervisor;
- in the Community Recreation Branch, provision of services are managed by community recreation programmers, who co-ordinate and lead part-time recreation staff (instructors, lifeguards, camp counselors etc.).

Formerly, the division organized the city into five districts: North, South, East, West and Central Services and Waterfront. The Central Services and Waterfront District were responsible for cross-city issues as well as specific services such as the ferry services. The North, East, South and West Districts were further divided into three physical areas. Each of these subdivisions had a manager in charge of the operation of recreational programming, facilities and parks; a Technical Services and Urban Forestry Section responsible for the delivery of forestry services, facilities and park maintenance, and janitorial support; and an Operations Support Co-ordinator in charge of overseeing the cohesiveness of their subdivision with others as well as the community.

=== Fleet ===
- Chevrolet Silverado maintenance truck
- Ford maintenance truck model F-350
- Ford maintenance van model E-250
- Dodge Ram 1500
- Toyota Tundra
- Toyota Tacoma
- Ford Transit

The trucks can be identified with the city's wordmark on the front and passenger-side body, with 'Call 311' below it. Some trucks are retrofitted with amber lights.

The Parks branch also operates five ferries (four are passenger ferries) that travel to the Toronto Islands (see also Toronto Island ferries)

== Issues ==
=== Homelessness in parks ===
In September 2020, the City estimated that 350 to 400 people living in homeless encampments in the park system. During the COVID-19 pandemic, health measures at shelters was inadequate which led to a rise in encampments in parks. In October 2020, the Ontario Superior Court ruled that the City did not comply with physical distancing measures in the shelter system. The by-law which prohibits camping and setting up camps in parks was challenged by a group of homeless residents in 2020 on the grounds that it violated the Charter of Rights and Freedoms. A court rejected the motion, ruling that the Charter does not grant the right to live in parks.

== See also ==
- List of Toronto parks
- List of Toronto recreation centres
- Dempsey Store (North York)
