= Operation Laser =

Military operation during COVID-19 pandemic in Canada

Operation Laser (stylized as Operation LASER) is a domestic operation of the Canadian Armed Forces for contingency planning and response in the event of a pandemic. Its three goals are: protecting CAF personnel and capability, assessing CAF capabilities to respond to a pandemic, and assisting other government departments in the event of a pandemic.

During the COVID-19 pandemic in Canada Operation Laser was first activated on March 2, 2020; with escalation to Phase 3 of the operation on March 13. Under Operation Laser, military medical personnel and resources were deployed to certain long-term care facilities in Quebec and Ontario to assist with operating those facilities. These deployments were authorized by the Department of National Defence at the request of those provinces' premiers, François Legault and Doug Ford.

== Operation Laser during the COVID-19 pandemic ==
=== Background: Long-term care facilities ===
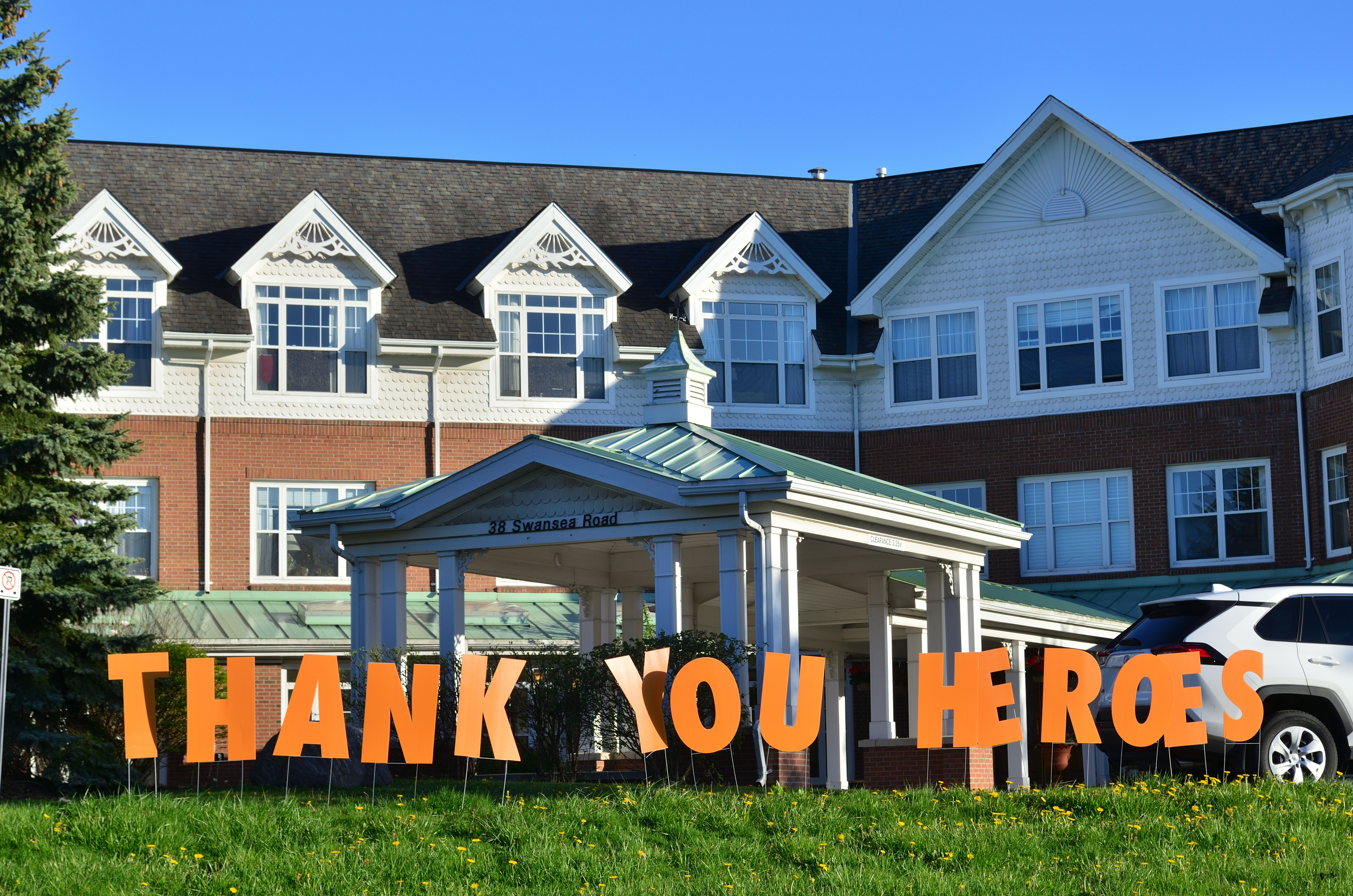
"Thank You Heros" sign at a long-term care home in Ontario

Long-term care homes were impacted heavily by the pandemic; Chief Public Health Officer of Canada Theresa Tam reported on April 13, 2020 that at least half of COVID-19 deaths in Canada had been linked to long-term care homes (with the exact number varying by province), and that "these deaths will continue to increase, even as the epidemic growth rate slows down. Tam cited factors such as outside visitors, communal living spaces, and staff being transferred among multiple facilities, as particular vulnerabilities. The pandemic has exacerbated pre-existing staffing issues at some facilities, including underpaid staff, and being understaffed in general. On April 28, Tam stated that as many of 79 percent of Canada's COVID-19 fatalities occurred in long-term care homes.

Health Canada issued recommendations for long-term care homes, encouraging them to restrict outside visitors and volunteers, restrict employees from being transferred between multiple facilities, provide personal protective equipment, enforce physical distancing during meals, screen staff and essential visitors, On April 15, Trudeau announced that the federal government planned to provide additional pay to long-term care workers.

=== CAF involvement ===
On April 17, the Department of National Defence (DND) agreed that the Canadian Armed Forces (CAF) could deploy in Quebec at long-term care facilities (LTCF). They agreed to send 100 military personnel in response to a request by Premier François Legault.

On April 20, the CAF deployed in Quebec. Inside the long-term care facilities, the only uniforms worn were medical scrubs.

On April 22, Doug Ford placed a request that the CAF come to the aid of Ontario's LTCF, just like Francois Legault had done previously in Quebec.

On May 7, the CAF reported that it had deployed "almost all of its medical capacity" in Quebec LTCF. "The Canadian military has stripped bases across the country of their uniformed medical personnel to support long-term care homes in Quebec that have been overrun by COVID-19." At the time, in Ontario, 250 soldiers worked in five LTCFs. As the Ontario mission progressed, this number was increased to seven LTCFs. By middle of May, Quebec would see 1,350 soldiers in 25 LTCFs.

On 13 May, the functions of Joint Task Force Laser (JTF-LR) were assumed by the Canadian Joint Operations Command, headquartered in Ottawa. Previously, they had been delegated to the 1st Canadian Division Headquarters in Kingston.

On May 15, the CAF declared that four soldiers in Quebec and one in Ontario had tested positive for COVID-19 disease. Nearly 1,700 members of the CAF were at that time deployed. One deployment was to a LTCF in Montreal "where residents had been nearly abandoned by the staff." The CAF stated that:

The risk to our personnel remains high due to the fact that we are often operating in high-risk COVID-19 threat environments and working in close proximity with persons who have either tested positive or are exhibiting COVID-19 related symptoms.

On May 15, it came to light that soldiers from the 12^{e} Régiment blindé du Canada were posted to the LTCFs around Montreal. This meant that 2nd Canadian Division, whose commanding officer is Brigadier-General Gervais Carpentier, and which is based in CFB Montreal, had been deployed there.

On May 21, the DND announced that it had seen a substantial increase in the number of COVID-19 infections in the previous week, from five to 28. A total of 1,400 had been serving in Operation Laser at 25 LTCF including in Montreal, where the disease was spreading widely the previous week. The photographs disseminated show soldiers with bare hands and in T-shirt-style medical scrubs while DND emphasized:

[the] unique military knowledge and skills that position them to assist civil authorities in specialized areas in Canada's fight against COVID-19 (...) All CAF personnel (...) are properly trained and equipped... Additionally, the CAF has contracted hotels to support the housing requirements of CAF members providing direct on-site support to LTCFs. Independent food, transportation and laundry systems are made available to personnel to ensure the force is self-sufficient.

LCol James Stocker, who commanded Territorial Battle Group 1, the rapid response unit which undertook the mission in Ontario's LTCFs under the 4th Canadian Division of Brigadier-General CJJ Mialkowski, said: "I think they are quite well prepared for the task." This military contingent was increased to 1,675 soldiers by May 21. The DND spokesperson would not release, when asked, the detailed statistical data that would allow the public to infer about the problems. In addition to "the guidelines laid down by the military's medical branch", the DND takes instructions from the Public Health Agency of Canada and provincial authorities on the personal protective equipment distributed to the soldiers. "At the Vigi Mont Royal LTCF in Montreal, soldiers started out wearing N-95 masks but shifted to using full shields, visors and hoods when reports surfaced that the virus was being spread through the ventilation system." It came to light on this day that Operation Laser deployment is not classified by DND as a "special duty" operation.

On 25 May, Parliamentary Secretary to the Minister of National Defence Anita Vandenbeld disclosed to the third sitting of the resumed 43rd Canadian Parliament that 36 soldiers from Operation Laser had been infected with COVID-19 disease. Vandenbeld corrected for the record Cheryl Gallant who had been under the mistaken impression that only 28 soldiers (12 positives in Ontario and 16 in Quebec) had been infected.

The next day, it was disclosed that the Ontario Op Laser LTCFs suffered in human resources from a form of disrepair, decay and dilapidation. The DND released a letter by BGen Mialkowski dated 14 May in which he reported the unvarnished truth as he and his soldiers found it. The five Ontario Op Laser LCTFs can be found below.

On 27 June, the military said that 40 per cent of COVID-positive troops deployed to long-term care homes were asymptomatic. The troops, 55 of whom tested positive, were not tested by the military but rather by the care homes. General Jonathan Vance and the deputy Surgeon-General Marc Bilodeau said that the troops may have infected themselves in hotels where they were billeted. All of the 55 troops who contracted the disease had recovered and none were hospitalized. The military acknowledged it had no uniform testing program for troops and the CPHO was unavailable for comment.

== Geography ==
=== OpLaser in Ontario ===
- Eatonville Care Centre, 420 The East Mall Etobicoke
- Hawthorne Place Care Centre, 2045 Finch Ave West North York
- Orchard Villa, 1955 Valley Farm Pickering
- Altamont Care Community, 92 Island Ave Scarborough
- Holland Christian—Grace Manor, 7900 McLaughlin Road Brampton

=== OpLaser in Quebec ===
- Grace Dart Extended Care Centre (Montréal)
- CHSLD Vigi Reine-Elizabeth (Montréal)
- Résidence Berthiaume-Du Tremblay (Montréal)
- CHSLD Vigi Mont-Royal (Ville Mont-Royal)
- CHSLD Floralies-De-Lasalle (Lasalle)
- Centre d’hébergement de Saint-Laurent (Saint-Laurent)
- CHSLD Argyle (Saint-Lambert)
- CHSLD Benjamin-Victor-Rousselot (Montréal)
- CHSLD Auclair (Montréal)
- CHSLD de la Rive (Laval)
- CHSLD Eloria-Lepage (Montréal)
- Centre d'Hébergement Jean-De-La-Lande (Montréal)
- Centre d’Hébergement Saint-Andrew (Montréal)
- CHSLD Denis-Benjamin Viger (Montréal)
- Le Bellagio (Longueuil)
- Centre d’Hébergement Real-Morel (Montréal)
- CHSLD Jean-Hubert-Biermans (Montréal)
- Centre d’Hébergement Saint-Margaret (Montréal)
- CHSLD Cartierville (Montréal)
- Centre d’Hébergement Nazaire-Piché (Montréal)
- CHSLD de Lachine (Lachine)
- CHSLD Paul-Gouin (Montréal)
- CHSLD Henri-Bradet (Montréal)
- CHSLD Hôpital Sainte-Anne (Sainte-Anne-de-Bellevue)
- CHSLD Valéo (Saint-Lambert)
- CHSLD Villa Val des Arbres (Laval)
- Manoir de Verdun (Montréal)
- Centre d’hébergement Yvon-Brunet (Montréal)
