= Cloverdale Mall =

Shopping mall in Canada

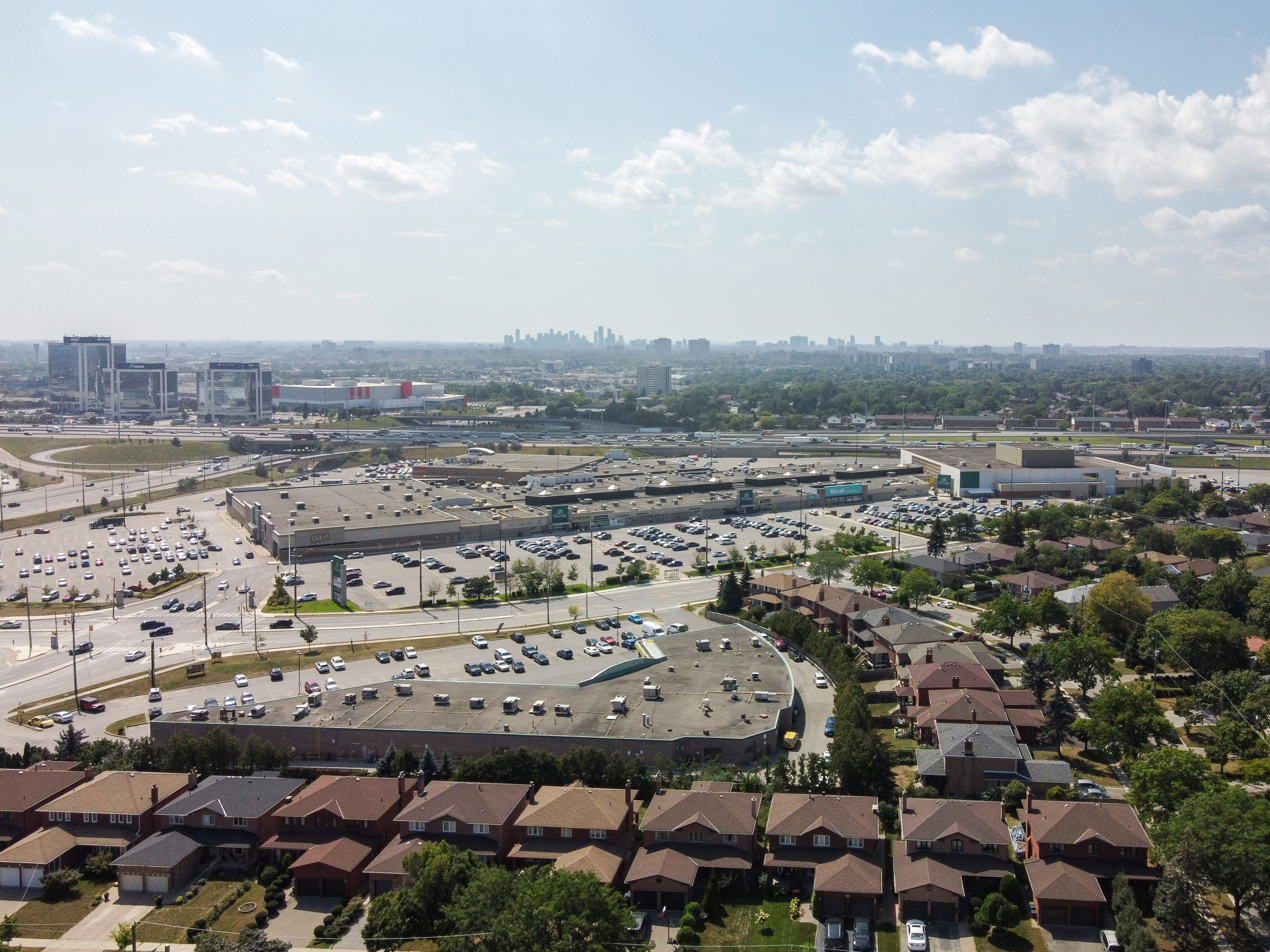
- Cloverdale Mall in 2021
- Coordinates: 43°37′53″N 79°33′18″W
- Address: 250 The East Mall; Toronto, Ontario; M9B 3Y8
- Opened: 1956
- Developer: Bentall Kennedy
- Manager: QuadReal Property Group
- Owner: QuadReal Property Group
- Num. of stores: less than 60
- Num. of anchor tenants: 4
- Floor area: 46,000 m^{2} (500,000 sq ft)
- Floors: 1
- Website: cloverdalemall.com

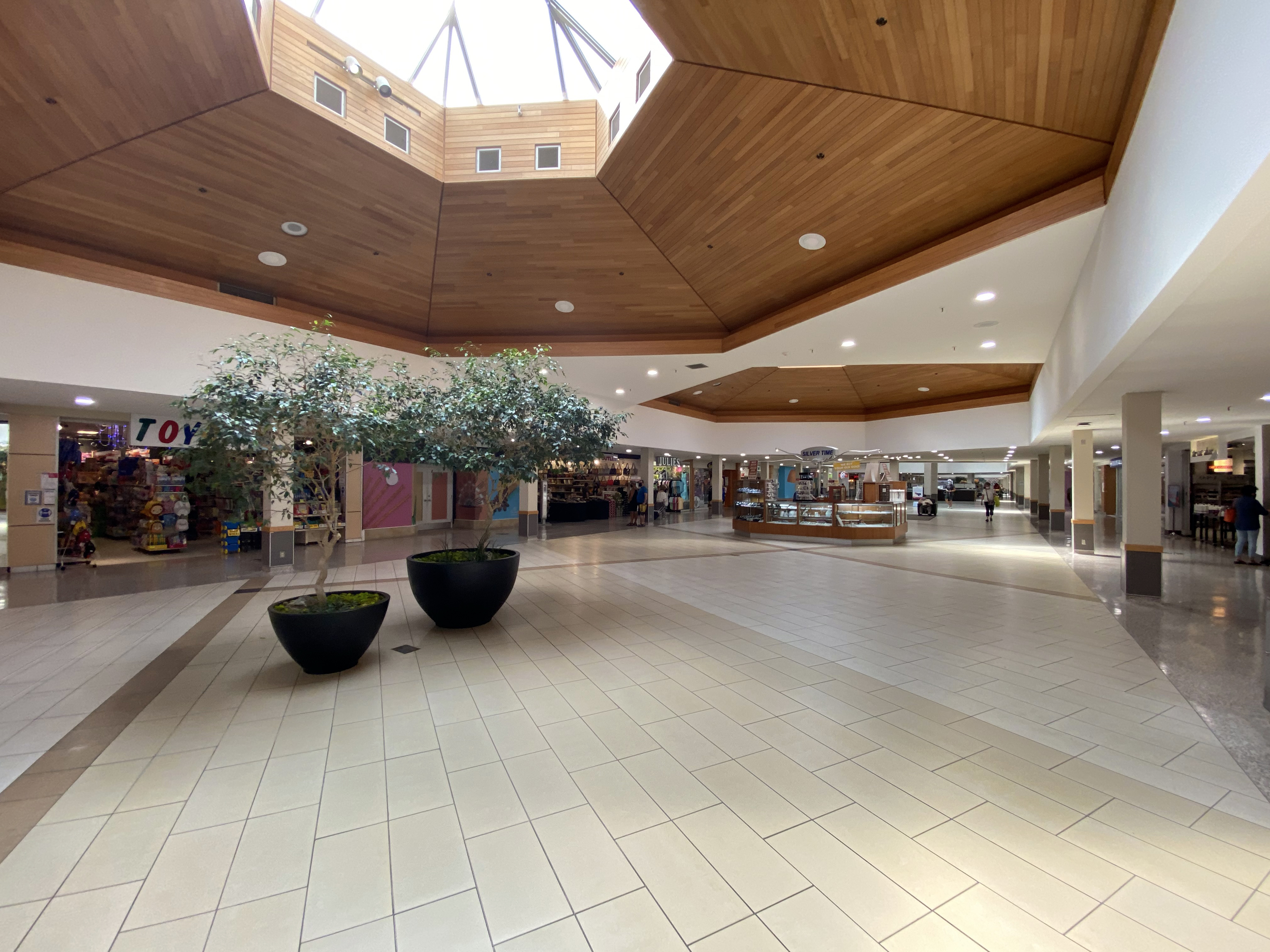
Mall Interior

Cloverdale Mall is a community shopping centre located in the Etobicoke district of Toronto, Ontario, Canada, at 250 The East Mall northeast of the intersection of Dundas Street West and Highway 427). It opened in 1956 as an open-air shopping plaza on what was part of the Eatonville farm.

== History ==
On November 15, 1956, Cloverdale Mall opened with 34 stores such as Dominion, S.S Kresge, Laura Secord Chocolates, Tip Top Tailors, United Cigar Stores as well as the Bank of Nova Scotia and Canadian Bank of Commerce. The centre of the plaza was an open-air concrete courtyard. A Morgan's anchor store of two floors joined in August 1960 as part of an expansion of the shopping centre. In the 1960s, following the purchase of Morgan's by the Hudson's Bay Company, the Morgan's store was converted into The Bay. In the 1980s, Cloverdale Mall was converted into an enclosed mall and expanded.

In 2005, Hudson's Bay Company replaced The Bay department store with their discount store Zellers at the mall's north end. Zellers expanded the lower/main level retail floor space but did not continue using the upper level of the Bay's former space, and it has been closed ever since. Winners and Kitchen Stuff Plus opened where the old Zellers outlet was at the mall's southern end. The mall underwent major renovations in 2006. In late 2008, the Dominion store was rebranded as Metro.

In September 2012, the Zellers store closed as its lease was sold to Target. Target opened on the bottom floor of the old store in March 2013. On January 15, 2015, Target announced it was withdrawing from the Canadian market and all its stores would be closed within 4–5 months. The Cloverdale store remained vacant until February 2024, when Fairgrounds Public Racket Club opened a pickleball court in the former Target space.

QuadReal, the property owner, had proposed replacing the existing mall with a mixed-use development covering 32 acres, while retaining the Cloverdale Mall name. QuadReal plans to submit the rezoning application in March 2020.

In February 2021, it was announced a site at the mall was being prepared as a large-scale clinic for distribution of the COVID-19 vaccine during the COVID-19 pandemic in Toronto.
