= Eatonville, Toronto =

Eatonville
- Neighbourhood
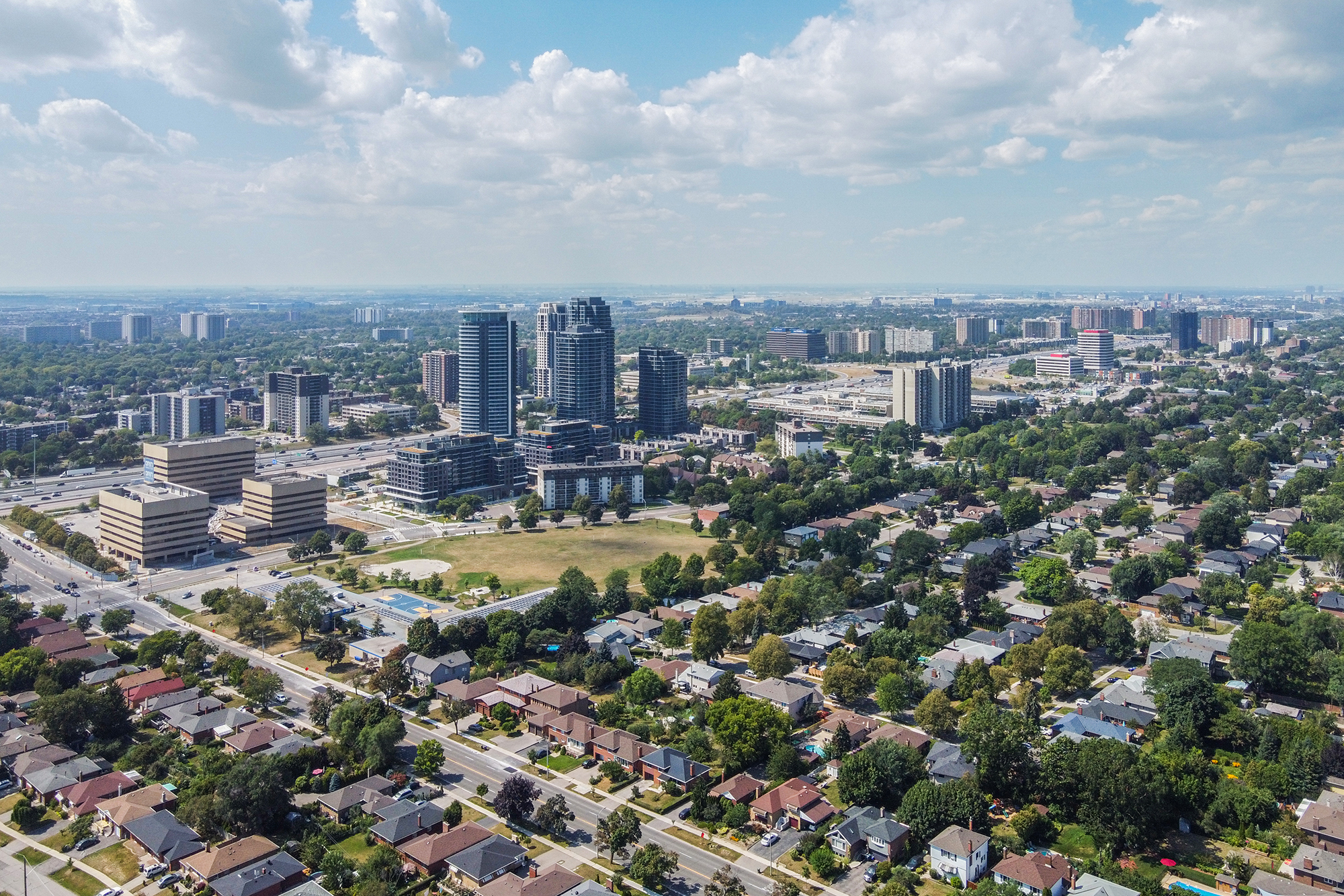
- Aerial view of North on the West Mall

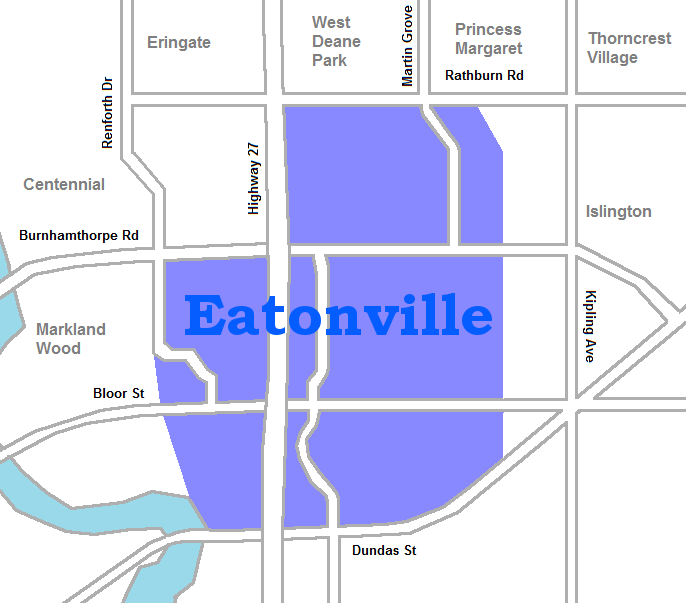
- Vicinity

- Location within Toronto
- Coordinates: 43°38′20″N 79°32′52″W
- Country: Canada
- Province: Ontario
- City: Toronto
- Established: 1918
- Changed Municipality: 1998 Toronto from Etobicoke

Government
  - MP: James Maloney (Etobicoke—Lakeshore)
  - MPP: Christine Hogarth (Etobicoke—Lakeshore)
  - Councillor: Stephen Holyday (Ward 2 Etobicoke Centre)
  - Councillor: Mark Grimes (Ward 3 Etobicoke—Lakeshore)

Eatonville is a neighbourhood in Toronto, Ontario, Canada. It is located west of the central core in the former suburb of Etobicoke. Eatonville is bisected by Highway 427, with the community generally located north of Dundas Street West and south of Rathburn Road. Eatonville consists mainly of low density residential homes (constructed primarily in the 1950s east of Highway 427, and in the 1960s and 1970s west of Highway 427). The main arterial roads in the community, such as the West Mall, the East Mall and Burnhamthorpe Road, contain a mix of rental and condominium high-rise apartments and townhouses. Cloverdale Mall is in the neighbourhood, and there are community retail areas along Bloor Street West and Dundas Street West.

== History ==
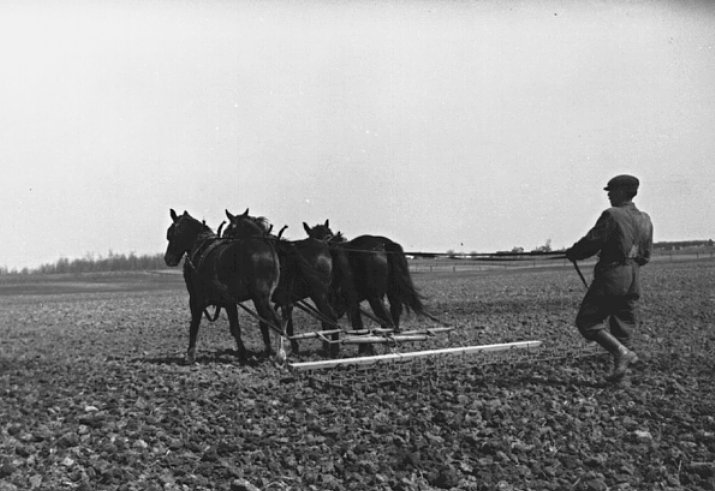
Farmhand working on the Eaton farm in 1922.

Eatonville began as a 160-hectare (400-acre) farm owned by Peter Shaver at the end of the 19th century. The farm was one of two purchased by the Eaton's department store in the 1890s (the other was in Georgetown, Ontario) to provide a reliable supply of milk for the store's lunchroom and drug store lunch counter. Eaton's donated a parcel of the farm land to the local elementary school, which was named "Eatonville School" in honour of its benefactor. The name of the school led to the area becoming known by the Eatonville name.

The Eaton Farm supplied milk, poultry and vegetables to Eaton's until the 1950s, when it was sold and subdivided for residential development.

Today, Eatonville is the home of the Etobicoke Civic Centre, which used to be the city hall of the former City of Etobicoke. The community is also home to the Eatonville branch of the Toronto Public Library, which was reconstructed in 2003. The Applewood Shaver House has been preserved, and was relocated to the West Mall adjacent to Broadacres Park; it now serves as a local historic museum and public event centre. which includes a much-admired Summer Concert Series.

The area used to have a second shopping mall, just a short walk from Cloverdale. Honeydale Mall is awaiting redevelopment.

== Education ==
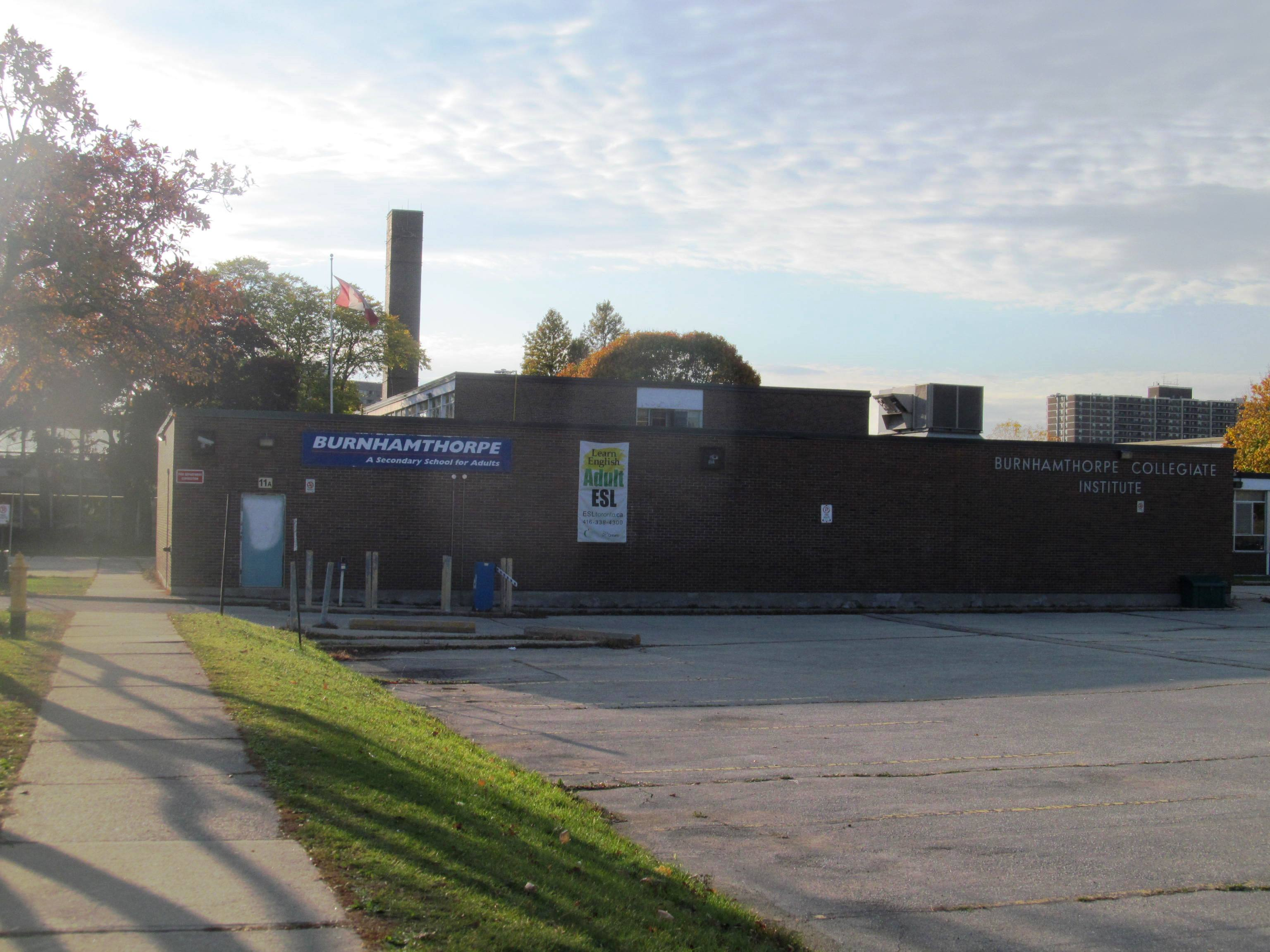
Burnhamthorpe Collegiate Institute is a secondary school situated in the neighbourhood.

- Broadacres Junior School – A public elementary school located at 45 Crendon Drive, located north of Burnhamthorpe Road and west of the West Mall. It was opened in October 1959 in Broadacres Park, the site of the local Shaver family's historic 'Applewood' farm house and across the street from Etobicoke's former City Hall.
- Bloorlea Middle School – A public middle school located at 4050 Bloor Street West, at the corner of Bloor Street and the East Mall. It opened its doors in 1957.
- Burnhamthorpe Collegiate Institute – A public secondary school located at 500 the East Mall.
- Eatonville Junior School – A public elementary school located south of Burnhamthorpe Road and west of the West Mall. Eatonville has been situated on its present site since 1827 and was first known as the "Swamp School". The Eaton family donated the land for the original school site. The current school was built in 1955. In 1998, students of the school created a time capsule to be opened on the 200th anniversary of the school.
- West Glen Junior School
- Wedgewood Junior School- A public elementary school located at 5 Swan Avenue, south of Burnhamthorpe Road.
- St. Elizabeth Catholic School
- Olivet School – A private elementary school located at 279 Burnhamthorpe Road, north of Burnhamthorpe Road and east of the East Mall. It was opened in September 1959 and is still running today.

== Institutions ==
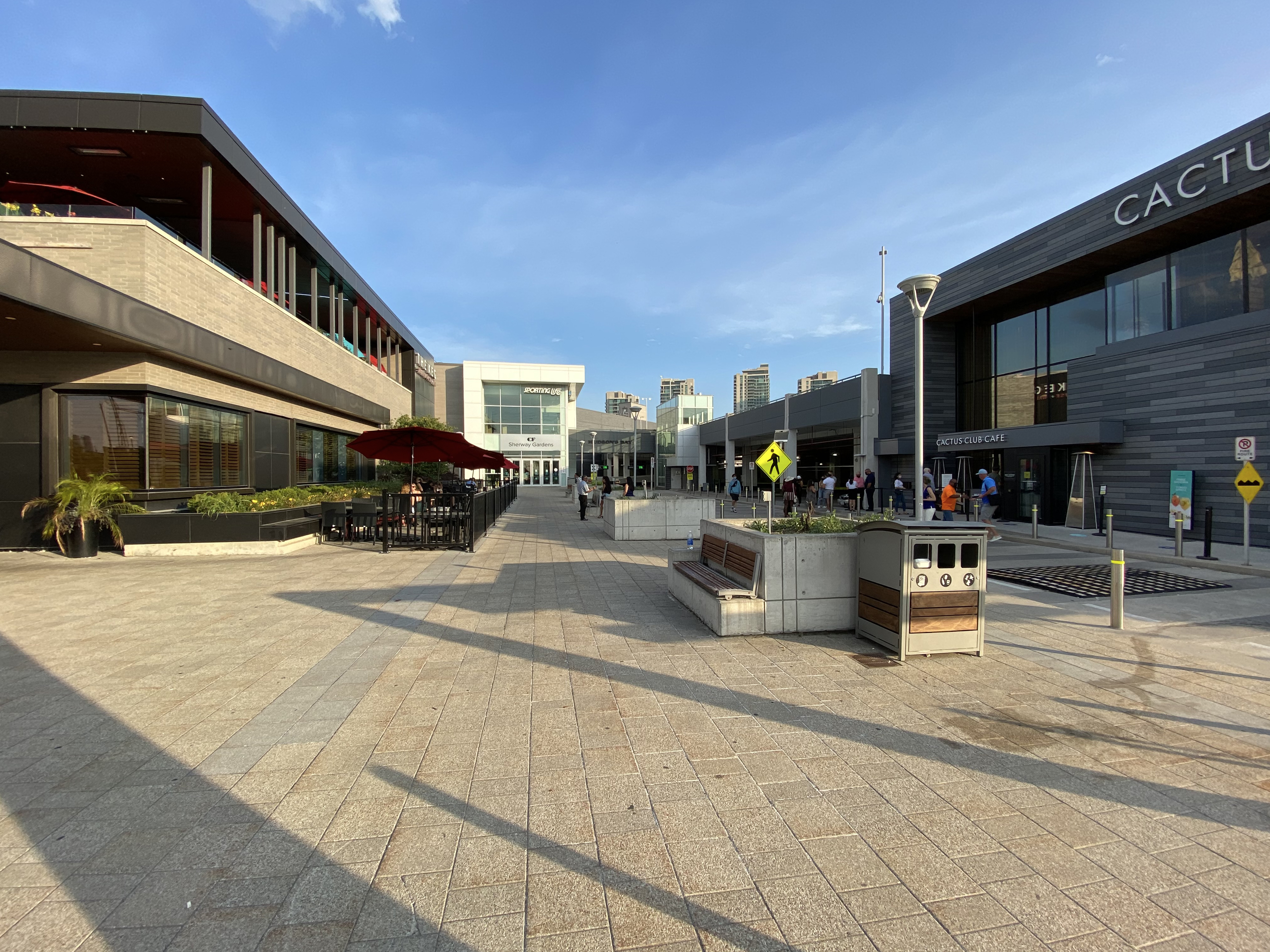
Sherway Gardens is a retail mall located in Eatonville.

- Etobicoke Civic Centre
- Applewood Shaver House
- Eatonville Library (founded 1964)
- Sherway Gardens
- Cloverdale Mall
- Burnhamthorpe Mall
- Bloordale Plaza
- Eatonville Care Centre, which suffered many deaths during the COVID-19 pandemic

=== Churches ===
- St James United Church
- Bloordale United Church
- Renforth Baptist Church & Cemetery
