= Death of Regis Korchinski-Paquet =

2020 death in Toronto, Canada

- Date: May 27, 2020
- Time: after 5:00 pm
- Location: Toronto, Ontario, Canada
- Cause: Accident
- Participants: Toronto Police; Claudette Beals-Clayton; Reece Korchinski-Beals
- Deaths: Regis Korchinski-Paquet
- Inquiries: Special Investigations Unit
- Coroner: Provincial Forensics Pathology Unit, Toronto; Office of the Chief Medical Examiner, Province of Newfoundland and Labrador

The death of Regis Korchinski-Paquet, a 29-year-old Indigenous-Ukrainian-Black Canadian woman, occurred in Toronto, Ontario, Canada on May 27, 2020. Responding to multiple 911 calls from Korchinski-Paquet, her mother, and her brother, for a domestic disturbance involving punches, thrown bottles, and knives, police attended her apartment. Subsequent to the arrival of police, Korchinski-Paquet fell to the ground 24 storeys below, and died at the scene. Her family accused the Toronto Police Service of having played a role in her death, which led to a Special Investigations Unit (SIU) investigation. The SIU announced in late August 2020 it had cleared all police officers of wrongdoing and found no evidence of police involvement in her death.

Korchinski-Paquet's death inspired a number of protests in Canada against police involvement in her death and other issues of anti-black and anti-Indigenous sentiment. These Toronto protests occurred around the same time as the George Floyd protests.

== Background ==
Five years prior to the incident, Korchinski-Paquet was diagnosed with epilepsy and mental health concerns that had sometimes resulted in calls to the police for assistance.

== Incident ==
Around 5:15 pm, Korchinski-Paquet's mother called police to their 24th storey apartment in High Park North after a domestic conflict. Six officers attended the scene. However, officers were confused as to whether epilepsy was justifiable reasoning for taking her into custody under the Mental Health Act. In a call to 911 by Korchinski-Paquet herself, she said that both her mother and brother had been drinking since 10 am.

The Toronto Police Service's Chief at the time, Mark Saunders, clarified that the call was for an assault, stating that three separate people had called in and that knives were being drawn at the scene, limiting the responding teams that could be sent to assist the situation.

When police arrived at the apartment, they were met by Korchinski-Paquet, her mother, Claudette Beals-Clayton, and brother, Reece Korchinski-Beals, in the hallway and exchanged a few words with the officers as they walked down the hall. Shortly thereafter, Korchinski-Paquet told officers she needed to use the bathroom and was followed into the apartment by multiple officers, who would not allow entry by other family members.

Korchinski-Paquet walked out onto the 24th-floor balcony and prevented officers from joining her by holding the door closed. She began to scale the balcony in an attempt to cross to the adjacent balcony, which was blocked off by netting. She lost her balance on the railing and fell to her death.

During this time, another officer knocked on the neighbour's door to attend to the second balcony, only to find it was blocked off by netting. He looked down and noticed Korchinski-Paquet's body on the ground; he immediately called for an ambulance. Korchinski-Paquet's mother was then heard telling a neighbour that her daughter jumped.

Korchinski-Paquet was pronounced dead at the scene.

== Reaction ==
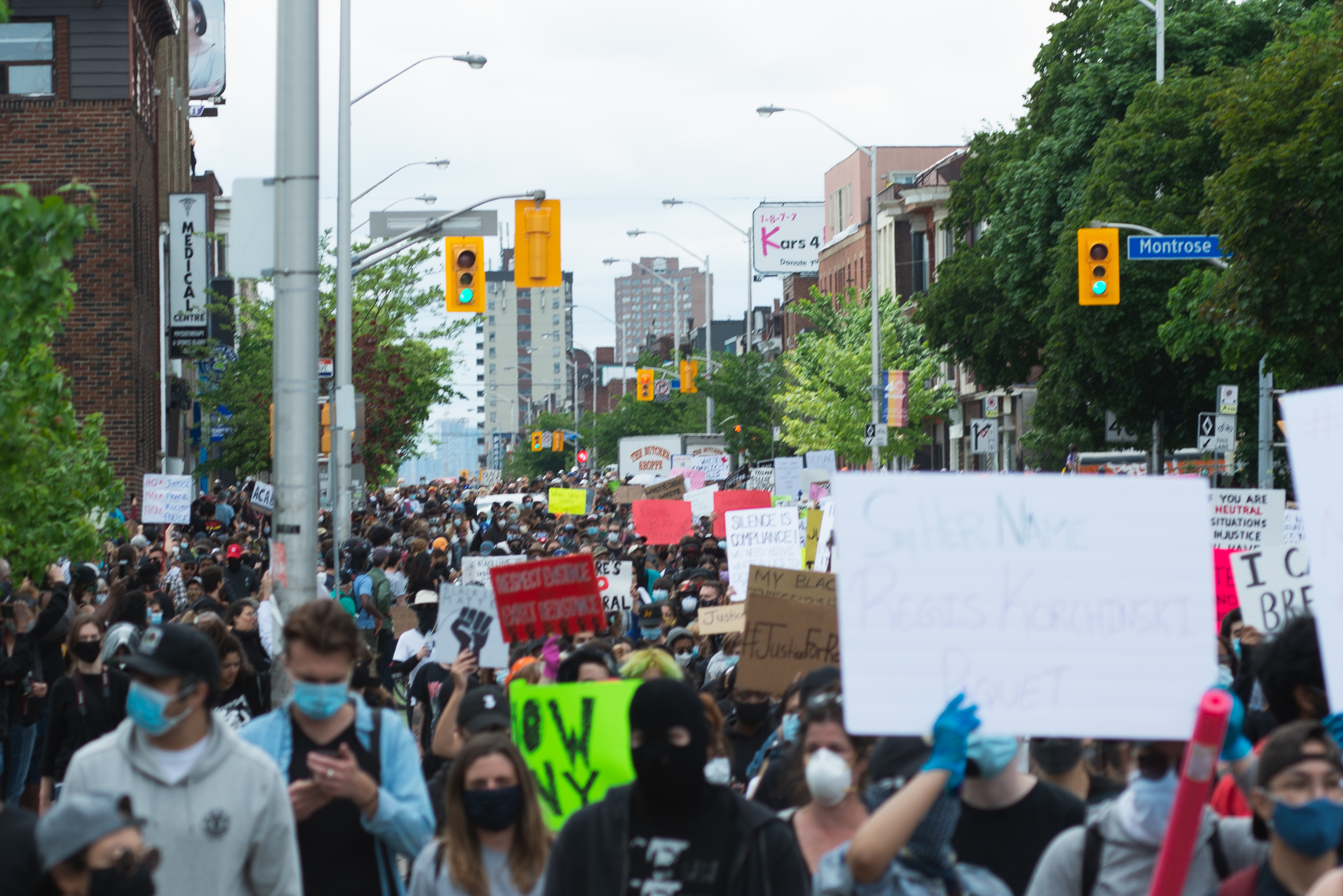
Protest in Toronto on May 30, 2020

Shortly after Korchinski-Paquet's death, her mother Beals-Clayton was recorded in a video stating that responding officers had shoved her daughter off the apartment balcony. Her cousin claimed that it was not possible that she decided to kill herself, stating "Exactly, my cousin's not jumping. She's a Christian woman, she’s not doing suicide, that ain't what we do, we don't do that, we ain't killing ourselves, that's number one, 100 per cent."

The Toronto Police Services Board announced that they agree that "everyone wants and deserves answers" and that they investigate the matter "as expeditiously as possible". The head of the union representing Toronto police stated that everyone should withhold judgement until all facts and evidence are available.

A protest organized by the group Not Another Black Life occurred on May 30. Thousands of people gathered to protest Korchinski-Paquet's death and other issues of anti-black and anti-Indigenous sentiment. Police officers estimated the protest was attended by 3,500 to 4,000 people at the Toronto rally, with a few hundred at a separate rally in Halifax. Due to the size of the crowd, many protesters were unable to maintain 2 metres (6.6 ft) of physical distance, which had been mandated by the province in response to the COVID-19 pandemic. A further protest in Toronto occurred on June 5.

The rallies took place at the same time as rallies, protests and riots in the United States and elsewhere in reaction to the murder of George Floyd by Minneapolis police.

== Investigation ==
An investigation was conducted by the Special Investigations Unit. On June 1, investigators announced that they had conducted interviews with six officers and four civilian witnesses and obtained video surveillance footage from the apartment complex.

On June 3, the Toronto Sun reported that Korchinski-Paquet blockaded the balcony door before falling to her death, citing unnamed sources. In response to the Sun reporting an apparent leak by police sources, the family of Korchinski-Paquet cancelled their scheduled police interviews with the Special Investigations Unit.

On August 26, the SIU cleared all officers of wrongdoing.

Findings in the SIU report declared no indication of "overt racism", and that "There were allegations in the wake of Miss Korchinski-Paquet's death that she was pushed off the balcony by police..." further adding "The evidence establishes that this did not occur."

The family, unhappy with the result of the investigation, are continuing their own private investigation. The family also filed a $10 million civil lawsuit in connection with her death, naming the City of Toronto, five Toronto police officers who were at the scene that night, the Toronto Community Housing Corporation, Ontario's attorney general and Joseph Martino of Ontario's Special Investigations Unit.

On March 30, 2021, the Office of the Independent Police Review Director (OIPRD) announced it had opened a new investigation on the police's conduct at the request of the family. In September 2021, the OIPRD released a report recommending that no charges be laid against any of the Toronto police officers involved in the incident. The family, in the name of Korchinski-Paquet's father, filed an application for judicial review of the OIPRD decision not to lay any charges. The father alleged, amongst other things, that the police failed to render assistance to his daughter after the family called 911 and asked for help in the aftermath of Korchinski-Paquet's two epileptic seizures, and that the police escalated the situation by not following training, using excessive force against her, failing to request the assistance of the Mobile Crisis Intervention Team and failing to take her mental health status into account. On November 2, 2022, a three judge panel of the Ontario Divisional Court dismissed the application on the basis that it was reasonable for the OIPRD to find no excessive use of force by the officers, no neglect of duty by the responding officers, no deceit committed by the responding officers in their report to the SIU, and no evidence that the responding officers had in fact removed or hidden Korchinski-Paquet's phone.

In 2026, the Office of the Chief Coroner ordered in inquest into the death.
