= Fran's Restaurant =

Small chain restaurant

Coordinates: 43.66133°N 79.383978°W

Fran's Restaurant Food Corporation
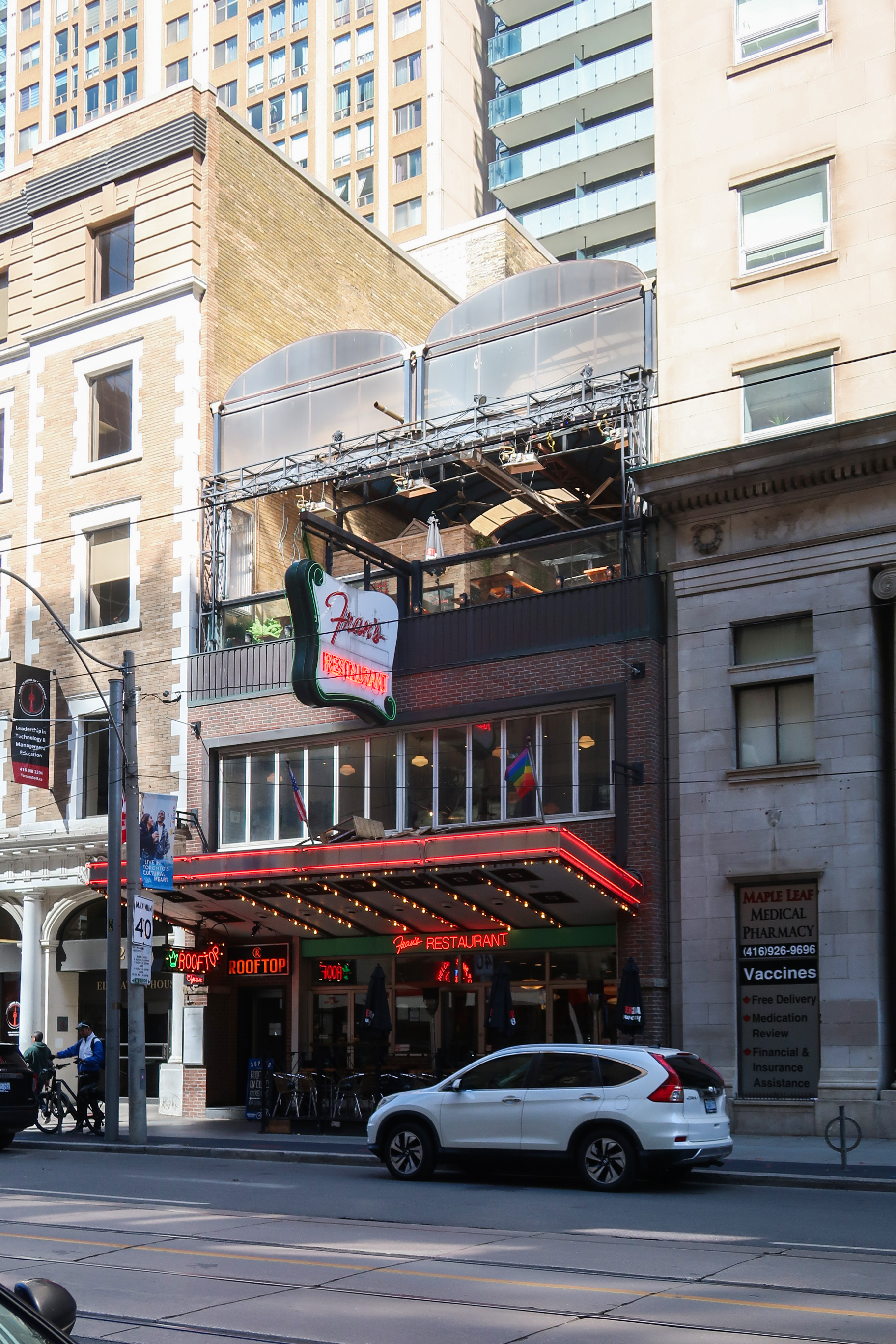
- Founded: Toronto, Ontario, Canada (1940)
- Headquarters: Toronto; Barrie
- Products: Eggs Benedict; Butter pancakes Fusion cuisines Milkshakes; Burgers; Soups; Sandwiches; Big breakfast Steaks; Pasta; Rice bowls

Fran's Restaurant is a small chain of restaurants based in Toronto, Ontario, Canada. Its first restaurant was a haunt of pianist Glenn Gould.

The flagship location was opened in 1940 by G. Francis "Fran" Deck at 21 St Clair Avenue West and closed in 2001. Fran's, originally beginning as a diner, had only ten seats, but later expanded to a small chain of restaurants in Toronto, including locations at 2275 Yonge and Eglinton (1945–2001), 1386 Bathurst south of Vaughan Road, Yonge and College (1950–present), Yonge and Dundas (1960–1984) Dundas and Bloor (closed late 1960s), and one in Hamilton. The head office was on Mt Pleasant Road north of Merton Street. Currently, Fran's operates two corporate-owned locations in Toronto, and one temporary location at the CNE during the summer months. Their current locations are 200 Victoria Street and 20 College Street, both within Toronto. The 33 Yonge Street location closed in early 2021 due to the COVID-19 pandemic.

After Fran Deck died in 1976 in a car accident in Tucson, Arizona, his son Frank Deck Jr. took over the business keeping it in the family. Deck Jr. and two of his sisters were directors of Fran Restaurants Ltd. In 1993, business at the College Street location declined by 10 percent due to the elimination of parking and cab stands and the installation of a bike lane in front of the restaurant. In the 1990s, the family-owned chain was sold to a group of investors who intended to expand the chain throughout the Greater Toronto Area. In 2001, the chain filed for bankruptcy which was attributed to the decline in demand for diner-style food and unsuccessful expansion in Hamilton, Windsor and Kingston; Fran's flagship location on St. Clair Avenue was closed. In 1997, the College St. location was purchased by an independent restaurateur, Joon Kim. The College St. location retained the Fran's menu and restaurant name. In 1998, the Fran's Restaurant company was purchased by Kim, the owner of the College St. location. Once again, Fran's Restaurant became a family-owned and operated restaurant, and continues to be run by Kim and his sons.

Because of the proximity of the College St. location to Maple Leaf Gardens, many of its clients were hockey fans catching a meal before or after a Maple Leafs hockey game. Moreover, many of its long-time customers continued to frequent the location.

In 2004, as a part of a gradual expansion program, a new location was opened in the Pantages Hotels and Suites at Victoria and Shuter. With the opening, Fran's modified its menu to include new food items alongside its traditional favourites by doubling the food choices. Following the opening of the Victoria and Shuter location, Fran's expanded to Barrie, Ontario, opening a restaurant on Bayfield Street in December 2006. This location became the first location not open 24 hours a day. It closed in 2015.

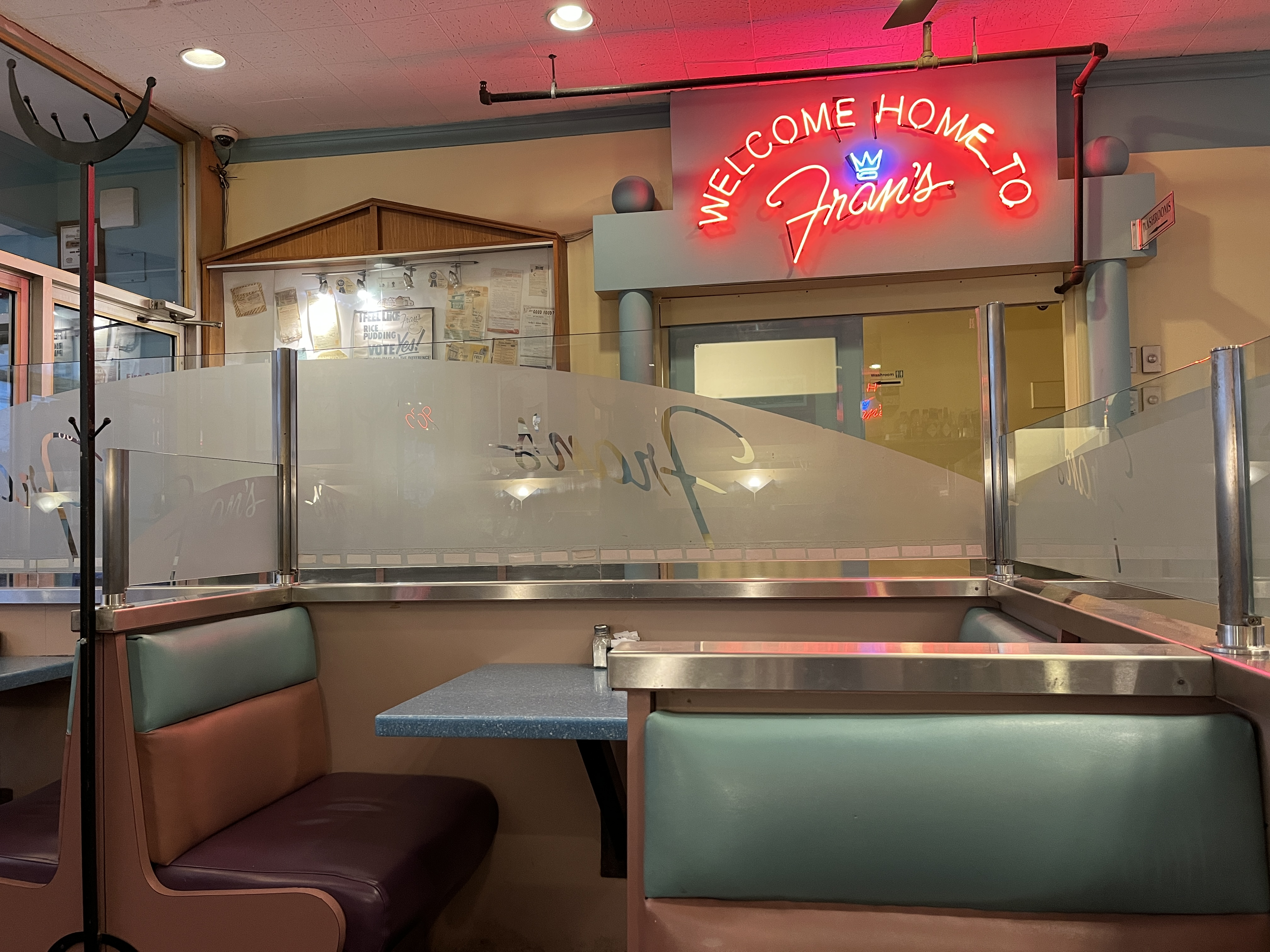
Restaurant interior, 2023

In 2009 Fran's Restaurants opened its first corporate United States location in downtown Kansas City, Missouri, in the Power & Light Entertainment District.

In August 2010, Fran's opened its third Toronto-based location near the intersection of Yonge and Front Streets, across from the Sony Centre for the Performing Arts. Along with its modern decor, it is also the first Fran's Restaurant to have a full-service bar in its substantial outdoor patio. This location is the first to expand its brand from a diner concept to a restaurant and bar and includes a full size outdoor bar and patio with both patio table and lounge chair configurations.

Fran's is credited as being the place where Gordon Lightfoot played one of his first Toronto gigs and ultimately the spot where he met Ronnie Hawkins, who poached him for better spots at Steele's Tavern.

It was a constant haunt of pianist Glenn Gould. The Canadian Broadcasting Corporation profile of Gould notes:

"Sometime between two and three every morning Gould would go to Fran's, a 24-hour diner a block away from his Toronto apartment, sit in the same booth and order the same meal of scrambled eggs."

When radio broadcaster Gordon Sinclair finished a morning shift at CFRB, he would go to Fran's for a glass of wine.

In 2014, Fran's opened a booth at the Canadian National Exhibition's Food Building for the first time and featured exclusive fare developed especially for the fair such as pie shakes, peanut butter-Sriracha balls, a Thanksgiving waffle, and a Big Breakfast Maple Toast Box.
