= Great Lakes Brewery (Toronto) =

Brewery in Toronto, Ontario, Canada

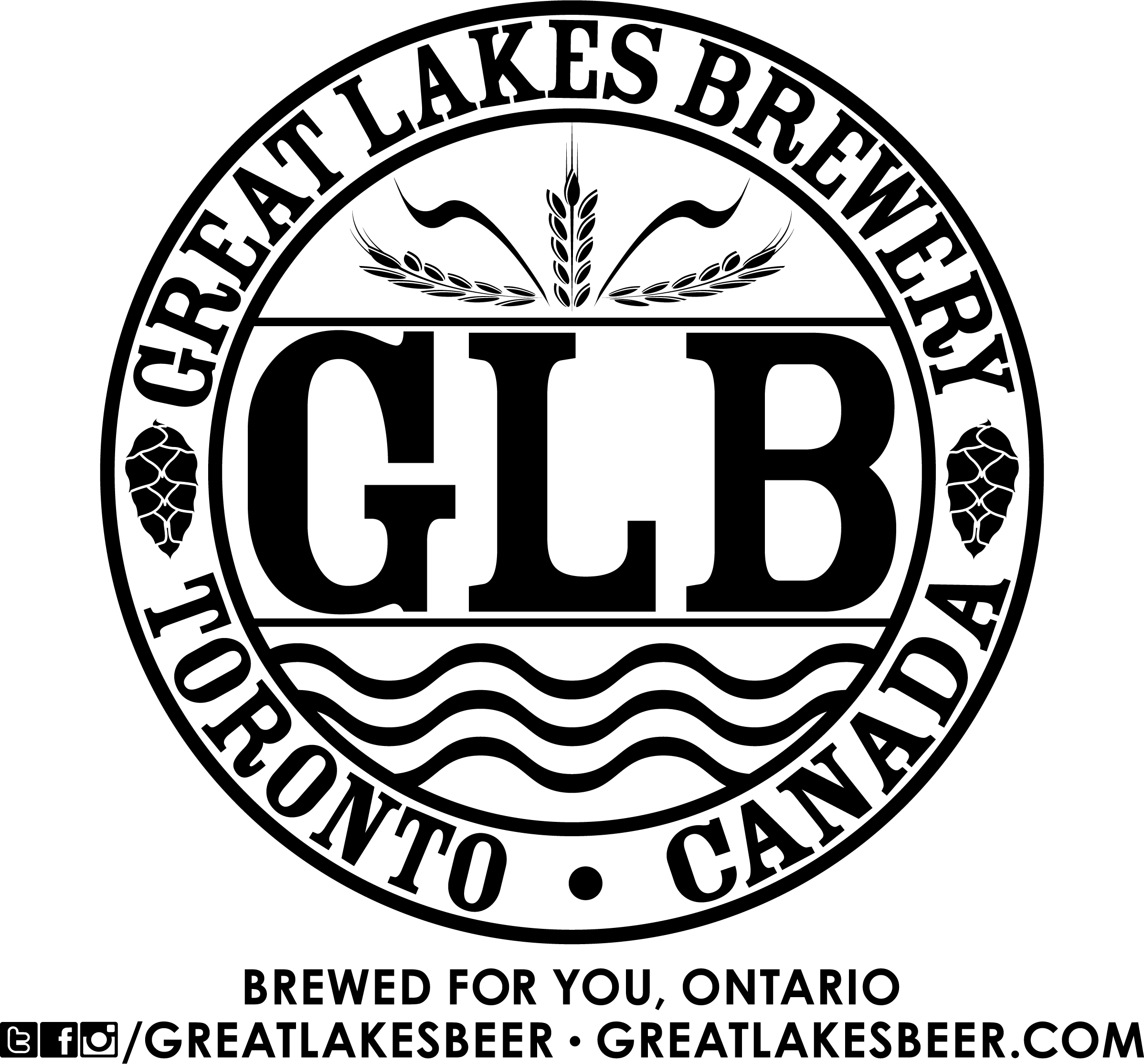
- Industry: Alcoholic beverage
- Founded: 1987
- Headquarters: Toronto, Ontario, Canada
- Area served: Ontario, Canada
- Key people: Peter Bulut Jr. (President & Owner); Mike Lackey (Brewing Operations Manager); Troy Burtch (Senior Manager, Sales and Business Development
- Services: Beer
- Website: www.greatlakesbeer.com

Great Lakes Brewery is a craft beer brewery in Toronto, Ontario, Canada.

Great Lakes Brewery was started in 1987 in an industrial unit in Brampton by Bruce Cornish and four other silent partners. The group produced two beers, an ale and a lager, using malt extract. The beer was packaged in 1 litre plastic home brew bottles with a focus on the home retailer. After four years of production, Cornish and the silent partners had run out of capital to keep the brewery functioning. Peter Bulut Sr., a construction magnate in Etobicoke, had been introduced to Cornish through respective business deals and plans were underway to sell the brewery to him. Bulut Sr. purchased the business in 1990, made the change from malt extract brewing to all grain, and in the early months of 1991, moved the brewery to Toronto.

In 2009, with the health of Peter Bulut Sr. in decline, his children, Peter Bulut Jr. and his sister Anetta Jewell, took on more responsibility of the day-to-day operations. They, along with the brewing team, introduced new brands and marketing initiatives that led to increased sales through the LCBO, bars and restaurants. The brewing team experimented with flavours, gave their beers weird and wacky names, and showcased their creations with monthly Project X nights (no longer taking place). Bulut Sr. died in 2010, leaving the brewery to his family. Bulut Jr. took over the brewery, operating as President and Chief Brewing Officer.

== Timeline ==
Year	Highlights
1987	Opened a malt extract brewery in Brampton. Two beers – Great Lakes Lager and Unicorn Ale
1990	Peter Bulut Sr. purchases the brewery and plans are underway to move production to Etobicoke
1991	Etobicoke brewery opens. All malt brewing commences. One beer is the focus – Great Lakes Lager
1991-2000	Great Lakes Lager only available in draught format to bars & restaurants
2000	Retail store opens to the public.
2006	Devil’s Pale Ale 666 is created on June 6, 2006, for the Toronto Festival of Beer.
2007	Winter Ale, Pumpkin Ale and Orange Peel Ale all make appearances at the LCBO and brewery retail store for the first time in 750ml and 650ml painted bottles respectively; Great Lakes is awarded a Golden Tap Editor’s Circle Award for leading the push for seasonal products in the Ontario craft brewing scene
2009	Project X launched at brewery. A monthly event where brand new beers were created on the pilot system and offered to Project X members. Many of the Tank Ten series of beers were first born at these events. Project X events officially ended in 2012, yet beers are still created under the Project X brand for the GLB retail store
2010	Introduces Canuck Pale Ale in time for the Vancouver Winter Olympics. Name later changes to Crazy Canuck.
2011	The popular one-off, Canuck Pale Ale, becomes Crazy Canuck Pale Ale and launches in the LCBO full-time in 473ml cans. Wins its 2nd consecutive Gold Medal at the Canadian Brewing Awards
2012	Celebrated 25th Anniversary with the launch of five brand new beers: Robust Porter, Vanilla Bean Imperial Espresso Stout, Belgian Saison, Imperial Black IPA and Bourbon Barrel-Aged Russian Imperial Stout.; Named Best Brewery for Cask-Conditioned Ale in Ontario at the 10th annual Golden Tap Awards
2013	Named the Canadian Brewery of the Year at the 11th annual Canadian Brewing Awards; Named Best Brewery for Cask-Conditioned Ale in Ontario at the 11th annual Golden Tap Awards; Introduced the Tank Ten series of beers
2014	Named the Canadian Brewery of the Year at the 12th annual Canadian Brewing Awards; Awarded the Gold, Silver and Bronze medals in the NA India Pale Ale category at the Canadian Brewing Awards for THRUST! an IPA, Karma Citra IPA, My Bitter Wife IPA; Named the Best MicroBrewery in Ontario at the 12th annual Golden Tap Awards; Named Best Brewery for Cask-Conditioned Ale in Ontario at the 12th annual Golden Tap Awards
2015	Canuck Pale Ale - Gold Medal at Ontario Brewing Awards; RoboHop Imperial IPA - Gold Medal at Canadian Brewing Awards; THRUST! an IPA - Silver Medal at Canadian Brewing Awards; Named the Best Brewery in Ontario at the 13th annual Golden Tap Awards; THRUST! an IPA - Best Seasonal/One-Off in Ontario at the 13th annual Golden Tap Awards
2016	Canuck Pale Ale - Best Regularly Produced Beer in Ontario, Golden Tap Awards; Named the Best Brewery in Ontario at the 14th annual Golden Tap Awards; Karma Citra IPA - Best Seasonal/One-Off in Ontario at the 13th annual Golden Tap Awards; Brewed a collaborative beer with Toronto City Councillor, The #6Dad Norm Kelly, for charity and called it "We the Norm #6Dad Pilsner"; Installed a new canning and bottling line, increasing output; Purchased a number of custom made fermenters and brite tanks from a local Etobicoke company

== Awards ==
Year	Awards	Competition
2010	Gold Medal - Canuck Pale Ale	Canadian Brewing Awards
2011	Gold Medal - Canuck Pale Ale	Canadian Brewing Awards
2013	Best Brewery for Cask Conditioned Ale in Ontario	Golden Tap Awards
2013	Canadian Brewery of the Year	Canadian Brewing Awards
2014	Best Brewery for Cask Conditioned Ale in Ontario	Golden Tap Awards
2014	Ontario Brewery of the Year	Golden Tap Awards
2014	Swept American Style IPA category	Canadian Brewing Awards
2014	Canadian Brewery of the Year	Canadian Brewing Awards
2015	Gold Medal - Canuck Pale Ale	Ontario Brewing Awards
2015	Best Seasonal/Specialty Beer in Ontario - THRUST! an IPA	Golden Tap Awards
2015	Ontario Brewery of the Year	Golden Tap Awards
2016	Best Seasonal/Specialty Beer in Ontario - Karma Citra IPA	Golden Tap Awards
2016	Best Regular Produced Beer in Ontario - Canuck Pale Ale	Golden Tap Awards
2016	Ontario Brewery of the Year	Golden Tap Awards

== See also ==
- Beer in Canada
- Barrel-aged beer
