= Tucker's Marketplace =

Restaurant in Ottawa, Ontario, Canada

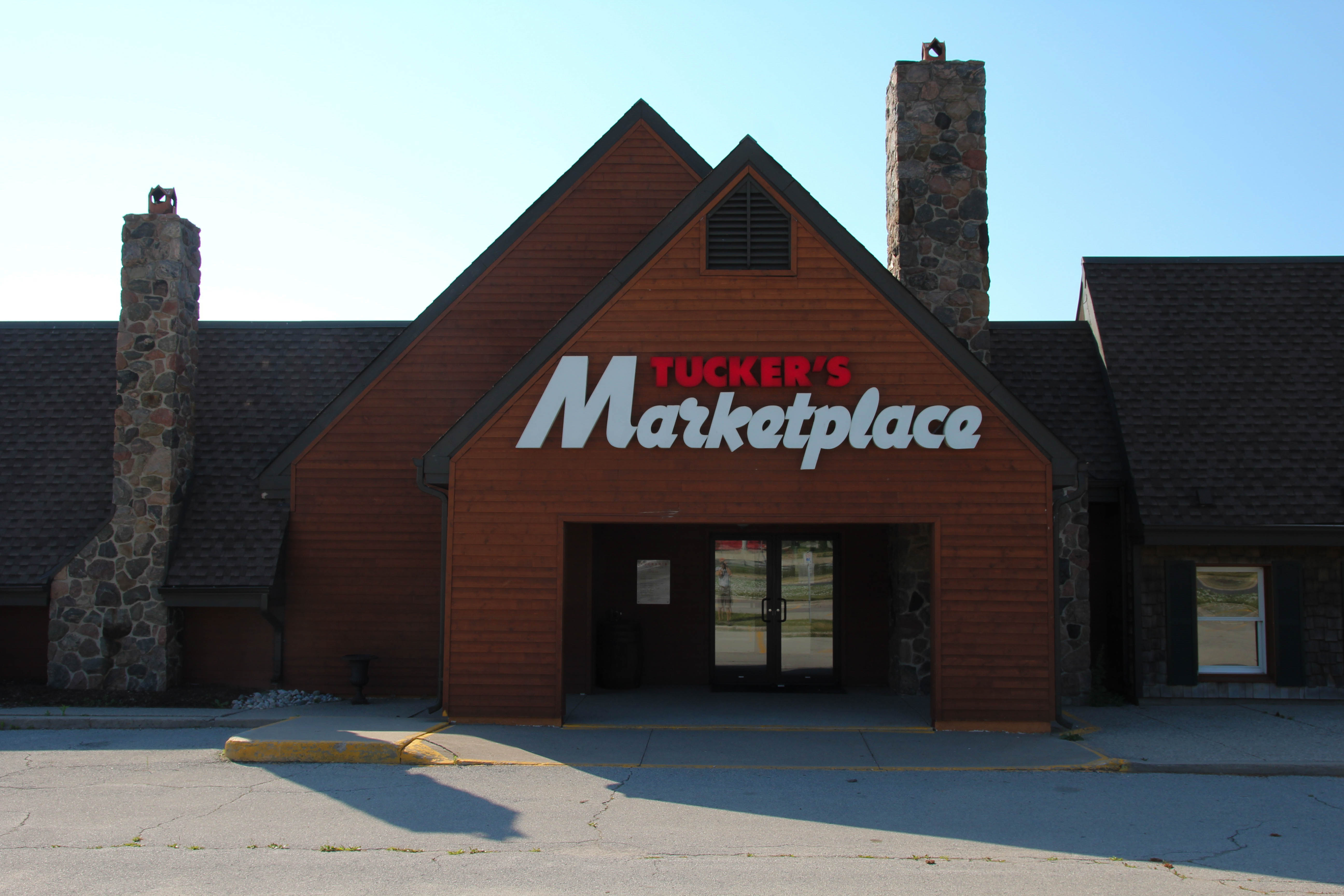
- Tucker's Marketplace's former location in Burlington, Ontario in 2020.
- Formerly: Mother Tucker's Food Experience
- Type: Private
- Industry: Buffet restaurant
- Headquarters: Canada
- Number of locations: 1 (2023)

Tucker's Marketplace is a buffet restaurant in Ottawa, Ontario, Canada. It opened in 2023.

Previously it was a chain of restaurants, with locations in Burlington, Mississauga, Pickering, and Toronto. It was founded decades earlier as Mother Tucker's Food Experience, an à la carte restaurant. The company ceased operations in June 2020, a result of the COVID-19 pandemic and its effect on the buffet format. On January 24, 2023, the company announced the Ottawa location would re-open on January 25, 2023. The restaurant's name is a reference to a colloquial expression in British English; "tuck in" meaning to commence the consumption of a large meal.

== Mother Tucker's Food Experience ==
Winnipeg entrepreneur Oscar Grubert opened the first location in February 1976, in downtown Edmonton, at 10184 104 Street. Its location was a brick warehouse built in 1927. According to The Globe and Mail, "The interior is a dimly lit rabbit warren (lined with barn siding, criss-crossed with huge wooden beams) of alcoves holding two, three or four tables. A cosy friendly atmosphere prevails amid an extraordinary clutter of such things as old cream separators, barrels, haymow hoists, washing machines, crocks, pots, teakettles, copper boilers and suchlike." The location was à la carte. The Globe and Mail described the chain as a "traditional roadhouse" in 1984, comparing it to Kelsey's and The Keg. Winnipeg and Calgary locations were opened within the first year, the latter replacing a location of Grubert's Butcher Block restaurant.

As of 1980, the company was headquartered in Winnipeg, likely a result of being owned by Champs Food Systems. It looked to expand into the United States. By 1981, the company intended to move its headquarters to the US within three years. In 1989, the Scarborough, Ontario chain solicited for franchisees.

=== Locations ===
As of 1984, the chain had 21 locations.

== Tucker's Marketplace ==
In 1994, the chain rebooted as Tucker's Marketplace. Largely a buffet split into themed stations, it continued to offer some table service items, including prime rib. Stations were dubbed "shops", including The Corner Baker, The Green Grocer, The CookStove, Carvery & Co, and The Ice Cream Stand.

The new brand was created by Mother Tucker's Food Experience (Canada) Ltd. and Working Ventures Canadian Fund Inc., as Newgen Restaurant Services. Nolan Grubert was named its president. The goal was to expand to 25 locations in Ontario and Quebec. As of 2018, the Tucker's Marketplace chain was still owned by Newgen.

As of the early 2000s, its tagline was "Here's Your Plate, Go Crazy."

Beginning in March 2020, the chain posted an open letter on its website, suggesting it would stay closed "until concern about the coronavirus, Covid-19 begins to ease." On June 25, 2020, an open letter was posted stating that due to Covid-19 "we will not be reopening our restaurants." The closure was announced chain-wide in late June, with the restaurant stating "that there is not a profitable path forward for our business."

The Ottawa location was confirmed to close on June 11, 2020 by CTV News Ottawa, but later was announced to re-open on January 25, 2023.
