= Toronto Economic Development and Culture Division =

Toronto Economic Development & Culture
Agency overview
- Formed: April 2005
- Jurisdiction: Toronto
- Agency executive: Mike Williams, General Manager
- Parent department: Toronto Parks, Forestry and Recreation Division
- Website: Economic Development & Culture website

The City of Toronto Economic Development and Culture Division is a division of Toronto Parks, Forestry and Recreation Division, a part of the City of Toronto. The division was created in April 2005. The division is responsible for creating economic opportunities, promoting cultural diversity, and working to create cultural and economic resources within the city. The general manager is currently Mike Williams.

== Units ==
The division operates through five business units, Arts and Culture Services, Business Growth Services, Film and Entertainment Industries, Museum and Heritage Services, and Program Support.

=== Arts and Culture Services ===
Arts & Culture Services is responsible for helping the developing of art and culture in the city. It provides financial support to art institutes and individual artists, manages the development of public art installations, running cultural events, and running art programs. In 2018, the division allocated CA$32.3 million in art grants and is responsible for 220 public art installations. The division hosts events like Doors Open Toronto, Nuit Blanche, and Canada Day celebrations.

=== Business Growth Services ===
Business Growth Services is the unit the helps Toronto business economically with a focus on job creation and investment. The unit also helps funds Toronto's 83 business improvement areas. The unit helps business ranging from micro enterprises to medium and large businesses that operated in the city's key industry sectors, retail, and services within the city's business improvement areas. The unit identifies 9 key export driven sectors to support:

- Life sciences
- Food processing
- Environmental technology
- Aerospace
- Financial services
- Fashion
- Design
- Information technology and smart city technology
- Education

=== Film and Entertainment Industries ===
The Film & Entertainment Industries unit is responsible for supporting Toronto's Toronto's Film Industry. It does this through running music and film events and festivals as well as assisting in the production of music and films in the city. The unit also assists the cities tourism and entertainment industries. In 2018, the unit help support 621 events in Toronto and 246 days of programming at Nathan Phillips Square.

=== Museums and Heritage Services ===
Museums and Heritage Services is responsible for managing 10 history museums and over 40 historical sites, which have over 100 buildings combined, within the City of Toronto. The unit manages the following history museums:

- Colborne Lodge
- Fort York
- Gibson House Museum
- Market Gallery at St. Lawrence Market South
- Mackenzie House
- Montgomery's Inn
- Scarborough Museum
- Spadina House
- Todmorden Mills
- Zion Schoolhouse

=== Program Support ===
Program Support is the unit responsible for providing support for the program and services provided by the Economic Development and Culture Division. It manages marketing and promotion of the division, develops policies and strategies, and provides administrative support.
