= Eatonville Care Centre =

Care facility in Toronto, Canada

Coordinates: 43°38′51.1″N 79°33′38.6″W

- Former names: Extendicare Highbourne Lodge; Highbourne Lifecare Centre

General information
- Location: 420 The East Mall, Etobicoke, Toronto, Ontario, Canada
- Completed: 1971
- Owner: Rykka Care Centres

Technical details
- Floor count: 5

Other information
- Seating type: beds
- Seating capacity: 247

Website
- eatonvillecarecentre.ca

Eatonville Care Centre is a privately owned long-term care facility in the Eatonville area of Etobicoke, Toronto, Ontario, Canada. As of 2020, it is owned by Rykka Care Centres. During the COVID-19 pandemic, it was particularly hard-hit, with 142 resident cases and 40 resident deaths. A report by the Canadian Armed Forces — who had been deployed to the facility, to assist — recorded "aggressive behaviour" by staff and drugging of residents that the Forces deemed unnecessary.

Unity Health Toronto — which oversees Providence Healthcare, St. Joseph's Health Centre and St. Michael's Hospital — was placed in control of the facility.

== Layout ==
As of 2016, the facility had one private room, 117 rooms with two beds, and 3 rooms with four beds. Three of the five floors had 62 beds, while the 5th floor had 61 beds.

It is next to Burnhamthorpe Collegiate Institute and the Burnhamthorpe Square office complex. A nearby office building is being replaced by "4Hundred East Mall Town Homes"; the lot had previously been considered for a senior's apartment.

== History ==
In 1991, Service Employees International Union and Royalcrest Lifecare Centres Ltd reached an agreement on a labour dispute. Archives of Ontario holds a file about the agreement. By 1992, it was owned by Extendicare Health Services Incorporation.

The facility was owned by The Royal Crest Lifecare Group, Inc. until at least 2008. Ownership of the facility transferred to Rykka Care Centres Inc. on January 1, 2011. The company renamed it from Highbourne Lifecare Centre to Eatonville Care Centre. The same purchase included Mississauga Lifecare Centre, which was rebranded as Cooksville Care Centre.

The Ontario Ministry of Health and Long-Term Care announced a program in October 2014, called the "Enhanced Long Term Care Home Renewal Strategy". Within the Mississauga Halton LHIN, that sought to redevelop 32% of area long-term care bed capacity. One of the sites identified was Eatonville. As of 2016, plans were still being considered. In 2016, the LHIN announced that it would assign additional nurse practitioners to the facility.

The facility's Term of License continues until June 30, 2025.

=== COVID-19 pandemic, deaths ===
During the COVID-19 pandemic in Toronto, there was an extensive outbreak at the facility. As of 23 May 2020, there had been 40 confirmed deaths, making it the ninth-most deadly outbreak in Ontario. On May 27, the Province of Ontario announced that it would take over management of the facility for two weeks. The four other facilities listed included the Sienna-owned Altamont Care Community, which had the third-most number of deaths.

The facility has a capacity of 247 residents, of which 142 became infected. As of 23 May 2020, there were 56 confirmed staff cases. As of 27 May 2020, Eatonville told the CBC that 129 residents and 89 staff had recovered, while 11 residents and 17 staff remained as active cases.

Their outbreak has received extensive media coverage, being one of the earliest outbreaks in the province, after Pinecrest Nursing Home in Bobcaygeon. As of mid-April, the facility struggled to maintain staffing levels, despite announcements of provincial support.

The Canadian Armed Forces was deployed to five nursing homes in the Greater Toronto Area, in late April, including Eatonville. Their resulting document details both broad and specific reports on neglect in the five facilities. The Canadian Broadcasting Corporation summed up the CAF's observations of Eatonville as "nothing short of horrid and inhumane as ill-trained, burned-out and, in some cases, neglectful staff coped with the growing care needs of elderly residents." Facility management is said to have investigated after the CAF witnessed "aggressive behaviour" by staff. Residents were not provided psychosocial supports for their separation from family. Staff would administer pro re nata narcotics or benzodiazepines to sedate the resident, "but when you talk to them they just say they're 'scared and feel alone like they're in jail' – no agitation or sedation required."

== See also ==
- COVID-19 pandemic in Ontario
- Impact of the COVID-19 pandemic on long-term care facilities
