= List of Toronto recreation centres =

The following is a list of community and recreation centres in the city of Toronto, Ontario, Canada. The city operates 152 recreation centres across the city. As part of the Toronto 2015 Pan American and Parapan American Games, the Etobicoke Olympium and the Toronto Track and Field Centre will be closed, renovated, and will reopen on September 2, 2014.

== A ==
- Adam Beck Community Centre
- Agincourt Recreation Centre (and Indoor Pool)
- Albion Pool and Health Club
- Amesbury Community Centre
- Ancaster Community Centre
- Angela James Arena Tennis
- Annette Community Recreation Centre
- Antibes Community Centre
- Armour Heights Community Centre

== B ==
- Balmy Beach Community Recreation Centre
- Banbury Community Centre
- Barbara Frum Community Centre
- Beaches Recreation Centre
- Bedford Park Community Centre
- Berner Trail Community Centre
- Birchmount Community Centre (and Indoor Pool)
- Birkdale Community Centre
- Bloordale Community School
- Bob Abate Community Recreation Centre
- Broadlands Community Centre
- Brown Community Centre
- Burrows Hall Community Centre

== C ==
- Carmine Stefano Community Centre
- Cedar Ridge Creative Centre
- Cedarbrook Community Centre
- Centennial Recreation Centre - Etobicoke
- Centennial Recreation Centre - Scarborough (and Indoor Pool)
- Chalkfarm Community Centre
- Commander Recreation Centre
- Cummer Park Community Centre
- Curran Hall Community Centre

== D ==
- David Appleton Community Recreation
- Dennis R. Timbrell Resource Centre
- Domenico DiLuca Community Centre
- Don Montgomery Community Centre
- Driftwood Community Centre
- Driftwood Leisure Centre

== E ==
- Earl Bales Community Centre
- Earl Beatty Community Centre
- East York Community Centre
- East York Curling Club
- Edenbridge Seniors Centre
- Edgehill House
- Edithvale Community Centre
- Ellesmere Community Centre
- Elmbank Community Centre
- Ethennonnhawahstihnen' Community Recreation Centre
- Etobicoke Olympium

== F ==
- Fairbank Memorial Community Centre
- Fairfield Seniors' Centre
- Fairmount Park Community Centre
- Falstaff Community Centre
- Flemingdon Community Centre
- Frankland Community Centre

== G ==
- Giovanni Caboto
- Glen Long Community Centre
- Gord And Irene Risk Community Centre
- Goulding Community Centre
- Grandravine Community Recreation Centre
- Gus Ryder Pool And Health Club

== H ==
- Harrison Pool
- Harwood Hall
- Heron Park Community Centre (and Outdoor Pool)
- Hillcrest Community Centre
- Hilltop Community School
- Hollycrest CS
- Holy Family Community Centre
- Horner Ave Seniors Centre
- Humberwood Community Centre

== I ==
- Irving W Chapley Community Centre
- Islington CS
- Islington Seniors' Centre

== J ==
- Jack Goodlad Centre
- James S. Bell CS
- Jenner Jean-Marie Community Centre
- Jimmie Simpson Recreation Centre
- John Booth Arena
- John English CS
- John G. Althouse CS
- John Innes Community Recreation Centre
- Joseph J. Piccininni Community Centre

== K ==
- Keele Community Centre
- Keele Street Jr. School
- Ken Cox Community Centre
- Kingsview Village CS

== L ==
- L'Amoreaux Community Recreation Centre
- Lawrence Heights Community Centre
- Leaside Curling Club
- Leaside Library

== M ==
- Main Square Community Centre
- Malvern Recreation Centre
- Markdale Preschool Site
- Mary McCormick Recreation Centre
- Masaryk-Cowan Community Centre
- Matty Eckler Recreation Centre
- Maurice Cody Community Centre
- McGregor Park Community Centre (and Outdoor Pool)
- Memorial Pool And Health Club
- Milliken Park Community Recreation
- Mitchell Field Community Centre
- Mount Dennis Community Hall

== N ==
- New Toronto Seniors Centre
- Norseman Community School And Pool
- North Kipling Community Centre
- North Toronto Memorial Community
- North York Civic Centre (and Indoor Pool)
- Northwood Community Centre

== O ==
- Oakdale Community Centre
- Oakridge Community Recreation Centre
- O'Connor Community Centre
- Oriole Community Centre
- Ourland Community Centre

== P ==
- Park Lawn CS
- Parkdale Community Recreation Centre
- Pelmo Park Community Centre
- Pleasantview Community Centre
- Port Union Community Recreation Centre
- Power House Recreation Centre

== R ==
- Regent Park Aquatic Centre
- Regent Park North Recreation Centre
- Regent Park South Community Centre
- Roding Community Centre
- Roywood Park RC

== S ==
- S. H. Armstrong Community Centre
- Scadding Court Community Centre
- Scarborough Village Recreation Centre
- Secord Community Centre
- Seneca Village Community Centre
- Sir Adam Beck JS
- Smithfield CS
- St. Lawrence Community Recreation Centre
- St. Marcellus CSS
- Stan Wadlow Clubhouse
- Stephen Leacock Community Centre
- Stephen Leacock Seniors Community Centre
- Swansea Community Recreation Centre

== T ==
- Tall Pines Community Centre
- Tam Heather Curling And Tennis Club
- Terry Fox Recreation Centre
- The Elms Community School
- Thistletown Community Centre
- Thistletown Seniors' Centre
- Toronto Track and Field Centre
- Trace Manes Park Community Centre
- Trinity Community Recreation Centre

== V ==
- Viewmount Community Centre

== W ==
- Wallace-Emerson Community Centre
- Warden Hilltop Community Centre
- Wellesley Community Centre
- West Acres Seniors Centre
- West Rouge Community Centre
- West Scarborough Neighbourhood Centre
- Willowdale Lawn Bowling Green

== See also ==
- Toronto Economic Development and Culture Division
- List of Toronto parks
