= Olympic Spirit Toronto =

Olympic-themed attraction

Coordinates: 43.656001°N 79.379282°W

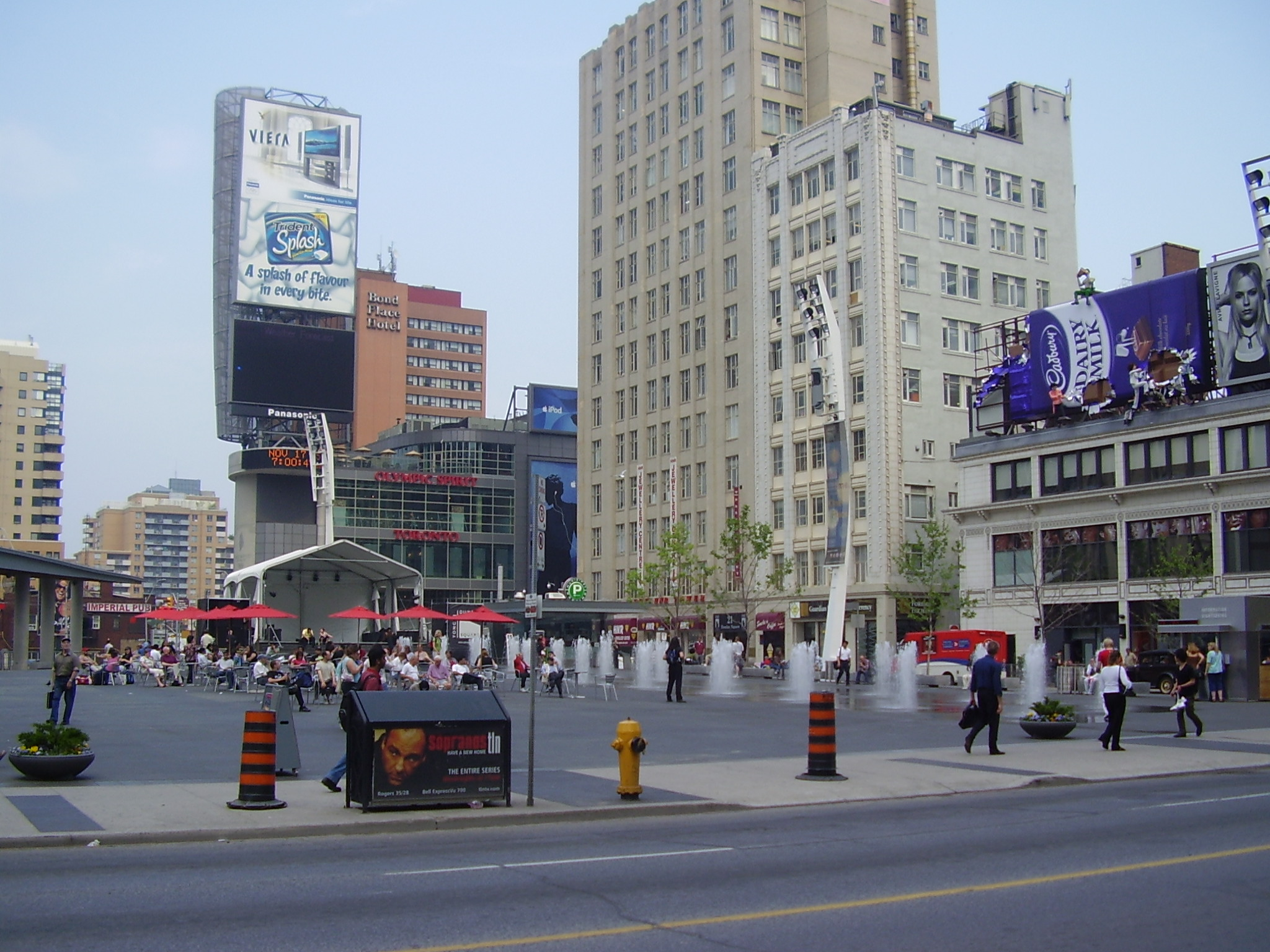
35 Dundas Street East, the former home of Olympic Spirit Toronto, seen in the background of Sankofa Square (on the left) and was the home of Citytv and Omni Television.

Olympic Spirit Toronto was an Olympic-themed attraction featuring the moments of high drama and emotion experienced by Olympians and fans throughout Canada's history with the Olympic Games. It offered visitors a taste of what the Olympics are about through interactive sports activities that gave them a chance to try Olympic sports and engage in friendly competitions among themselves. The education-oriented attraction operated in a building at 35 Dundas Street East on Yonge-Dundas Square (now Sankofa Square) in Toronto from August 2004 to August 2006.

Following the closure of Olympic Spirit Toronto, the building was purchased by Rogers Communications, and was renovated into television studios for Citytv and Omni Television. Citytv moved into the space on September 8, 2009.

Olympic Spirit won a number of prestigious awards, including the 2005 Thea Award for Outstanding Achievement and the 2005 Innovation Award presented by Tourism Federation of Ontario (TFO). The Calling, the high-definition film produced for Olympic Spirit, was awarded the 2005 AMOVA Award at the 23rd edition of "Sport Movies & TV - Milano International FICTS Fest" in Milano, Italy.

== Future of the Olympic Spirit in Toronto ==
Mark Dzenick, chairman of the Olympic Spirit Group, the master licensor of the Olympic Spirit concept together with the International Olympic Committee and the Canadian Olympic Committee, expressed his confidence in the city and optimism for the future. “I appreciate the effort that the local licensee and operator, PenEquity Management Corp. and Toros Entertainment Inc., put into the project. They believed in Toronto and in bringing the Olympic Spirit to its citizens. I have a great deal of faith and trust in the city. The Olympic Spirit is alive and well in Toronto, and we hope to announce plans for a more family-oriented location sometime soon.”
