= Meridian Credit Union =

Canadian credit union

Meridian Credit Union Ltd.

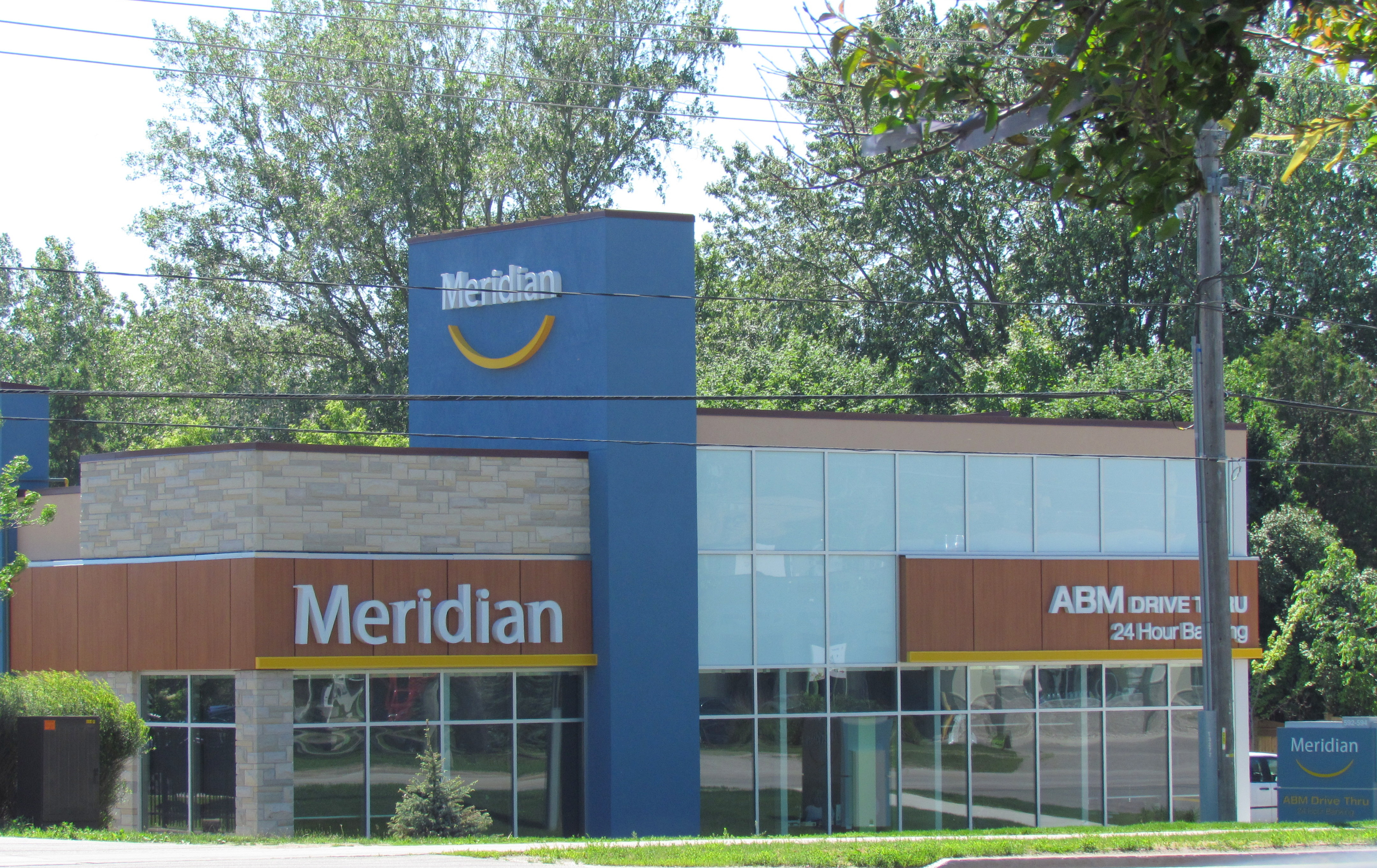
- Meridian Credit Union branch in Barrie, Ontario
- Type: Credit union
- Industry: Financial services
- Founded: April 1, 2005; 21 years ago
- Headquarters: St. Catharines, Ontario, Canada
- Number of locations: 88 branches (2023)
- Key people: Jay-Ann Gilfoy, President & CEO
- Products: Savings; chequing; consumer loans; mortgages; credit cards; online banking; Commercial banking
- Revenue: ▼CA$509 million (2023)
- Net income: ▼$81.5 million (2023)
- AUM: ▼$4.4 billion (2023)
- Total assets: ▲$27.5 billion (2023)
- Total equity: ▲$1.8 billion (2023)
- Members: 378,000
- Number of employees: 2,200 (2023)
- Subsidiaries: Meridian OneCap Credit; Motusbank
- Website: www.meridiancu.ca

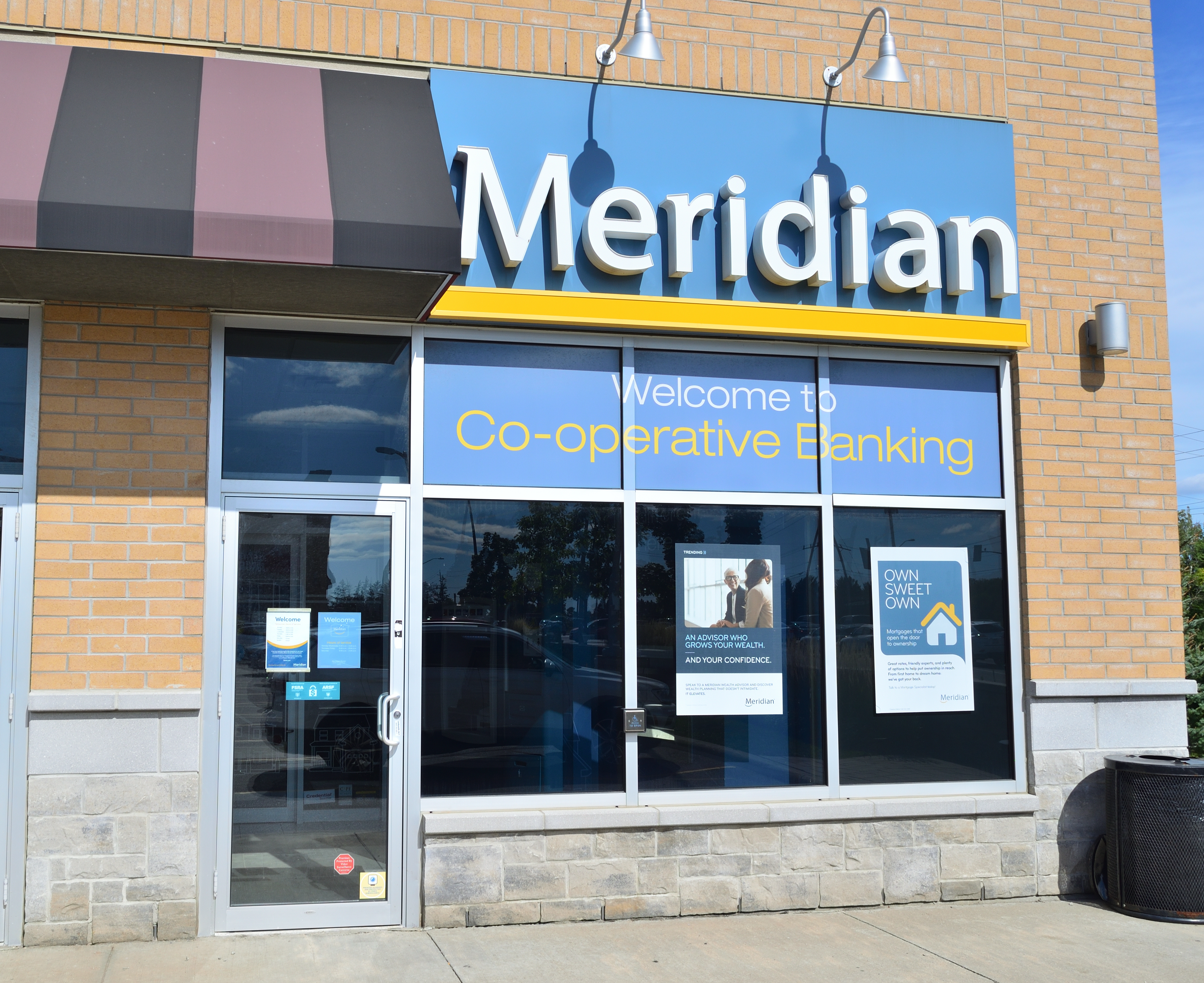
Meridian Credit Union in Richmond Hill, ON

Meridian Credit Union Ltd. is a Canadian credit union. It was formed on 1 April 2005 through the merger of Niagara Credit Union and HEPCOE (Hydro Electric Power Commission of Ontario Employees) Credit Union. It is insured by the Financial Services Regulatory Authority of Ontario.

== History ==
Meridian is the second largest credit union in Canada, and the largest credit union in Ontario, with more than 378,000 members with total assets under administration of over $28.5 billion. Meridian offers banking, wealth management, credit products and services through 88 branches, and fifteen Commercial Business Centres.

Desjardins Credit Union (the Ontario affiliate of the Desjardins Group, formerly Province of Ontario Savings Office ) and Meridian's membership voted in favour of a merger effective 1 June 2011. By 2012, most of the former Desjardins branches in Ontario had been renamed to Meridian branches.

In April 2016 Meridian completed its acquisition from Scotiabank of Roynat Lease Finance, a supplier of commercial equipment leasing. Roynat Lease Finance will operate as Meridian OneCap Credit Corp., a wholly owned subsidiary of Meridian Credit Union.

On 21 February 2017, Meridian announced and introduced a new line of Visa credit cards, moving away from MasterCard.

On 19 November 2019, Meridian won "Best Credit Union" at the 5th Annual Canadian FinTech & AI Awards.

During the COVID-19 pandemic in Ontario, Meridian closed branches and reduced hours to comply with lockdown orders. As a result, however, it laid off 109 members of its staff.

== Motusbank ==
Motusbank logo

On 17 August 2016, Meridian announced its intention to establish a federally chartered online banking subsidiary. On 4 February 2019 the name announced for the new entity was Motusbank, stylized as motusbank. Motusbank launched across Canada on 2 April 2019. As of June 2019, Motusbank had approximately CAD$54 million in capital.

Motusbank began winding down operations in 2025 with a final shutdown date of November 1. Deposit and loan accounts were moved to Meridian Credit Union (“Meridian”) and Coast Capital Savings Federal Credit Union (“Coast Capital”).

== Recognition ==
Meridian Credit Union was listed as one of Canada's top 100 employers by Maclean's magazine in 2009 and 2010.

== Sponsorships ==
Through its "Commitment to Communities" program Meridian Credit Union contributes money to local causes and encourages employees to volunteer in their community. The company also donates to national organizations such as the Alzheimer Society of Ontario. Facilities which Meridian owns naming rights to include Meridian Hall (Toronto), Meridian Place (Barrie) and Meridian Centre (St. Catharines).
