= Meridian Place =

Urban amphitheatre located in Barrie, Ontario

- Interactive map of Meridian Place
- Type: Amphitheatre
- Location: 30 Simcoe Street, Barrie, Ontario, Canada
- Coordinates: 44.3889°N 79.6877°W
- Area: 2,645.01 square metres (28,470.7 sq ft)
- Created: 2018
- Owner: City of Barrie
- Public transit: Barrie Transit Downtown Mini Hub
- Website: www.barrie.ca/community-recreation-environment/facilities-venues/meridian-place-memorial-square

Meridian Place is an outdoor, urban amphitheatre located in the heart of Barrie, Ontario next to Memorial Square and north of Heritage Park. It's entirely concrete with various features built for seating for an amphitheatre.

== Naming rights ==
The naming rights for 25 years were sold to Meridian Credit Union. A rainbow crosswalk has been installed crossing Simcoe Street between Meridian Place and Heritage Park.

== COVID-19 protesting ==
Since early March 2021, there have been protests against COVID-19 restrictions held at Meridian Place, with one protest on April 10 drawing a crowd of 300 people. The person who has led the protests was charged with a $800 fine by the Barrie Police Service. On April 17, People's Party of Canada leader Maxime Beriner attended the protests and gave a speech in front of a crowd of hundreds of protesters.
