= Barberian's Steak House =

Toronto restaurant

- Interactive map of Barberian's Steak House
- Location: 7 Elm Street, Toronto, Ontario, Canada
- Coordinates: 43.6576°N 79.3822°W
- Owner: Helen Barberian, Arron Barberian
- Capacity: 150
- Type: Steak house Restaurant

Construction
- Opened: 1959; 67 years ago

Website
- www.barberians.com

Barberian's Steak House is a downtown Toronto steakhouse located at 7 Elm Street, close to Sankofa Square. It was founded in 1959 by Harry Barberian (1930–2001) and is now owned by his son, Arron Barberian. The restaurant includes two main dining rooms, two private dining rooms, and a two-storey underground wine cellar housing over 20,000 bottles in 6.7-metre (22 ft) tall racks, with antique chandeliers, and a dining table for exclusive parties. The restaurant houses a collection of rare Canadiana including original paintings by the Group of Seven.

Patrons over the years have included Robert Morley, James Beard, Rudolf Nureyev, Veronica Tennant, Mick Jagger, Denzel Washington, Eminem and every Canadian prime minister since John Diefenbaker. Richard Burton and Elizabeth Taylor were engaged at the restaurant in 1964.

== History ==
Harry Barberian was the youngest of four children born to Armenian refugee parents. After working as manager-chef at Le Baron steakhouse, Barberian bought a cottage at 7 Elm Street for $6,000 and founded his own restaurant.

Arron Barberian has managed the restaurant since 1993 when his family bought back a controlling share twenty years after his father, Harry, had sold a majority share of the establishment and gone into retirement. The younger Barberian expanded the restaurant by building the wine cellar at a cost of $1.5 million. In 2014, Barberian's opened a spin-off take-out sandwich shop, TLP Sandwich Co. at 15 Elm Street, a few doors down from the main restaurant. The menu includes steak sandwiches and peameal bacon sandwiches, a chicken-thigh club and a fried-calamari sub among other offerings.

Arron Barberian is well known in Toronto for having been one of the catalysts behind the redevelopment of Sankofa Square, which is close to the restaurant, and for his fundraising efforts for local hospitals and other charitable causes. He even became a minor YouTube celebrity due to two incidents: the first, in which, during the Toronto Blue Jays 2013 home opener he comically wielded a bat which had flown into the stands after Cleveland Indians second baseman Jason Kipnis accidentally let go of it during a swing and the second when security cameras filmed him chasing and fighting back against a would-be mugger who had attempted to rob him.

== Recognition ==
=== Canada's 100 Best Restaurants Ranking ===
Barberian's
Year	Rank	Change
2024	94	new
2025	93	▲1
2026	▼ No Rank	
