= Province of Ontario Savings Office =

- Type: Crown agency
- Industry: Banking
- Founded: 1922
- Defunct: April 1, 2003
- Fate: Privatized and acquired by Desjardins Group
- Successor: Desjardins Credit Union
- Area served: Ontario
- Owner: Government of Ontario

The Province of Ontario Savings Office (POSO) was a financial institution established by the Government of Ontario, Canada in 1922 to provide a government-owned alternative to banks. The POSO was closed in 2003 when its assets were sold to the Quebec-based Desjardins Group cooperative of caisses populaires (credit unions) to form Desjardins Credit Union. In 2011, Desjardins Credit Unions in Ontario were transferred to Meridian Credit Union.

== History ==
The Savings Office was created by the United Farmers of Ontario government of Premier Ernest C. Drury to provide loans to farmers and other small borrowers who traditionally had limited access to credit, as well as to offer savings accounts paying interest on small deposits, something Canadian chartered banks at the time did not do.

POSO's authority to make loans was withdrawn by Premier Howard Ferguson's Conservative government that took office in 1923, and the institution's operations were effectively reduced to that of a government-run savings bank, offering savings, demand-deposit and term-deposit accounts at interest rates slightly higher than those available from commercial banks.

At the time of its closure, POSO had twenty-eight branches serving about 50,000 customers, approximately 100,000 accounts with deposits totalling about $CAD2.8B, and was responsible for coordinating the sale and distribution of Ontario Savings Bonds.

== Sale and closure ==
In the provincial budget of 2001, Ontario finance minister Jim Flaherty signalled the government's intention to sell POSO's assets to the private sector, announcing that the Province was "getting out of the banking business" as part of the government's privatization program to end "wasteful activities that could be eliminated".

Critics, most notably the Ontario Public Service Employees Union, the provincial public-sector union that represented POSO's two hundred employees, objected that the sale was ideologically motivated. The union noted that POSO turned an annual profit of about $10 million, and that, as POSO's deposits went to Ontario's consolidated revenue fund, from which they could be lent to the government at rates below those available from private lenders, the government would be increasing its borrowing costs at a time when its stated objective was eliminating the province's budget deficit.

An unsuccessful petition campaign was mounted to attempt to convince the government to abandon its plans for the sale, but the assets were sold to the Desjardins Group on April 1, 2003. The institution was then merged into Meridian Credit Union on 1 June 2011 and POSO's former institution number 239 revoked.

== See also ==
- ATB Financial
