= 33 Dundas Street East =

Studio complex in Ontario, Canada

Coordinates: 43.656001°N 79.379282°W

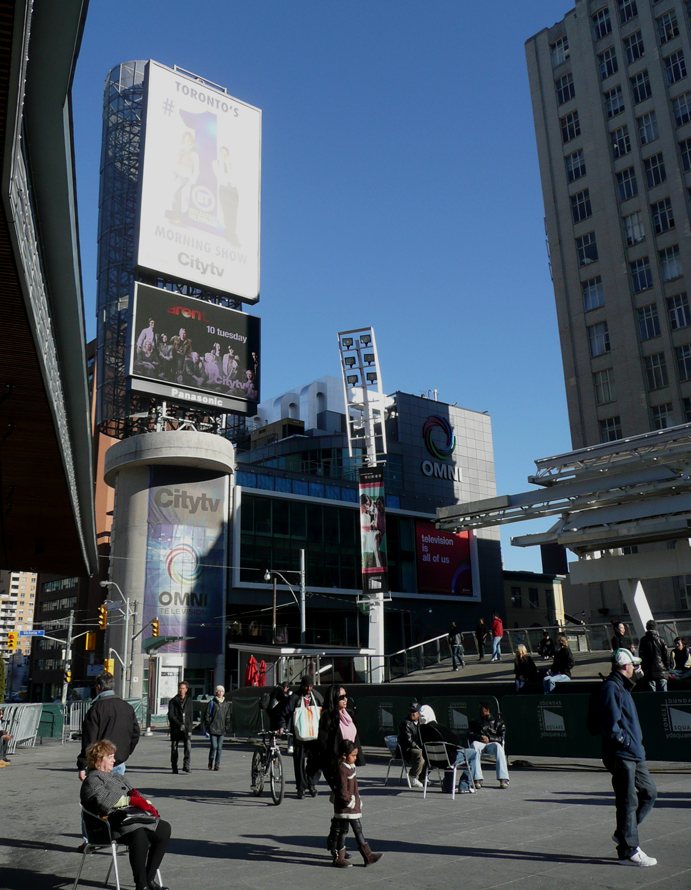
33 Dundas Street East, seen from Sankofa Square. The building's large billboard and TV screen are also visible.

33 Dundas Street East is a former studio complex located in downtown Toronto, Ontario, Canada. The building was acquired by Rogers Media in 2007 and was used until 2025 as the home of its four Toronto television stations: CITY-DT (Citytv), CFMT-DT (OMNI.1), CJMT-DT (OMNI.2) and CityNews 24/7. CITY-DT moved into the building on September 8, 2009, followed by the Omni stations a month later on October 19.

First built in 2004, the building was home to Olympic Spirit Toronto, an Olympic-themed entertainment attraction, until 2006 and before that a three-storey Salvation Army building.

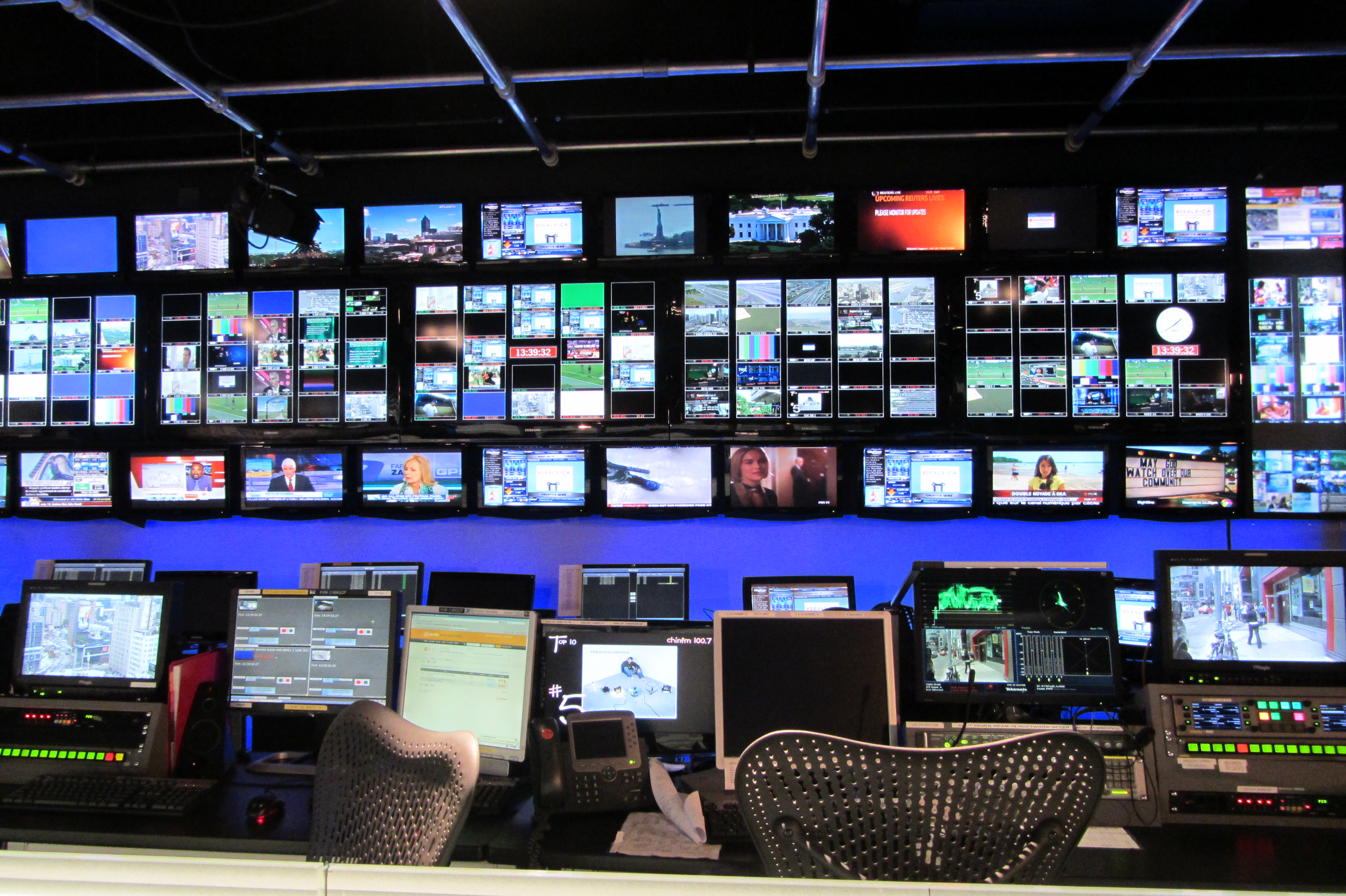
Citytv control room

The building features three floors of television studio space for Citytv and Omni. In keeping with the layout of Sankofa Square, 33 Dundas Street East is notable for its large billboard, which was used to advertise Citytv and OMNI's programming, along with a Jumbotron-style TV screen which relayed Citytv broadcast programming to those in the square below.

The building is located east of Yonge Street on Sankofa Square, near the Toronto Eaton Centre and 10 Dundas East (formerly Toronto Life Square). It was previously known as 35 Dundas Street East, but the street number in the address was changed to 33 in 2009.

CITY-TV's previous headquarters were located at 299 Queen Street West, which continues to serve the operations of most CHUM Limited's former specialty channels, all of which now owned by Bell Media. CFMT and CJMT were previously located at 545 Lake Shore Boulevard West.

The Rogers Communications headquarters, where the company's other radio stations are located as well as Sportsnet and Sportsnet One, is at the Rogers Building at One Mount Pleasant Road.

On March 17, 2025, Rogers' Toronto television stations and Breakfast Television re-located from 33 Dundas Street East to the Rogers Building.
