= Olympic Spirit Group =

Group based in Geneva, Switzerland

Based in Geneva, Switzerland, the Olympic Spirit Group is officially licensed by the International Olympic Committee to design, develop and manage Olympic Spirit Centers worldwide.

Olympic Spirit seeks to be an icon of Olympic values and ideals, to inspire and motivate the youth of the world to be the best they can be and to contribute to building a peaceful and better world in the Olympic Spirit which requires mutual understanding with a spirit of friendship, solidarity and fair play.

Olympic Spirit initiatives are underway in Canada (Vancouver hosts the 2010 Olympic Winter Games), London (host of the 2012 Olympic Games), Japan, Asia, the Middle East, Europe and the Americas.
