= Sankofa Square =

Public square in Toronto

- Public square
- Former name: Yonge–Dundas Square (2002–2025)
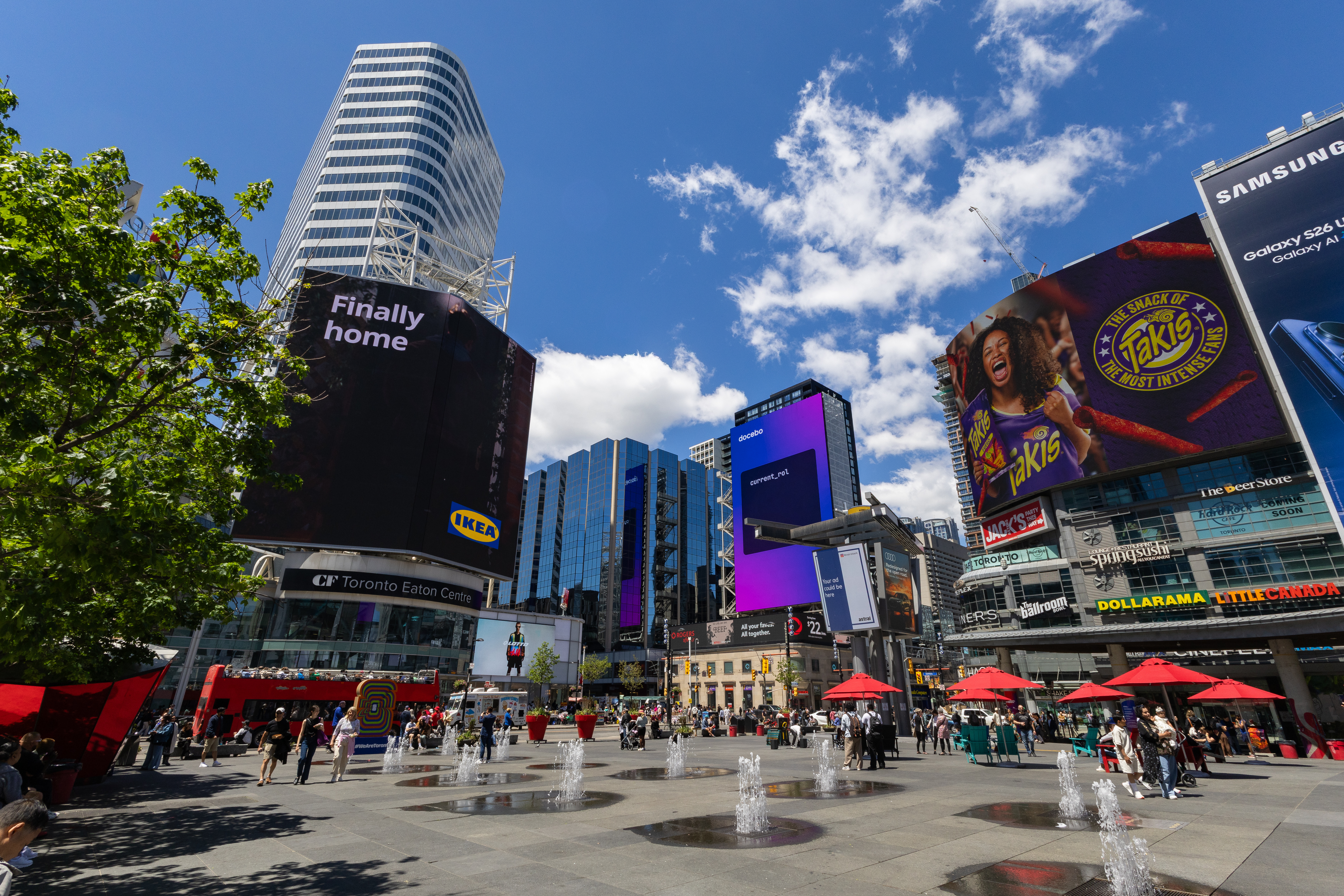
- The square in 2026
- Features: Concert stage; splash water features
- Design: Brown and Storey Architects
- Constructed: 1998–2002
- Opened: 2002
- Amenities: Shopping centre, food and beverage, subway
- Area: 0.40 hectares (1 acre)
- Surface: Granite
- Owner: City of Toronto
- Manager: Sankofa Square Board of Management
- Location: 1 Dundas Street East; Toronto, Ontario, Canada
- Public transit: at TMU
- Interactive map of Sankofa Square
- Coordinates: 43°39′22″N 79°22′49″W
- Website: https://www.sankofasquare.ca

Sankofa Square (formerly Yonge–Dundas Square), is a public square and outdoor venue at the southeast corner of the intersection of Yonge Street and Dundas Street East within the Garden District in the downtown core of Toronto, Ontario, Canada. The square was conceived in 1997 as part of a revitalization of the intersection and the stretch of Yonge Street. Since its completion in 2002, the square has held many public events, performances and art displays, establishing itself as a prominent landmark in Toronto and one of the city's prime tourist attractions.

Surrounding the square are other major landmarks, including the Toronto Eaton Centre, Ed Mirvish Theatre, and the 33 Dundas Street East building. The square is accessible from the Toronto subway at TMU station and is connected to Path, Toronto's underground pedestrian walkway. The square is continuously illuminated by large billboard screens and corporate logos, which has led to comparison of the square with Times Square in New York City, Shibuya Crossing in Tokyo, and Piccadilly Circus in London.

Central to the Downtown Yonge entertainment and shopping district, the square is owned by the city and is the first public square in Canada to be maintained through a public–private partnership. The intersection is one of the busiest in Canada, with over 100,000 people crossing the city's first pedestrian scramble daily.

== Description ==
Sankofa Square is bordered on the north by Dundas Street East, on the east by Victoria Street, and on the west by Yonge Street, and on the south by a street named Dundas Square. It is 1 acre (0.40 ha) in area. It is an irregular pentagon in shape. The angled northeastern side of the square along Dundas St, is known as the hypotenuse, which features a structure supported by 11 round concrete pillars. This creates an industrial urban aesthetic, which, being to the north, casts no shadows on the rest of the space. The other three sides are square.

The square is on a slight incline, which architects Brown + Storey have said was intended to evoke a theatrical stage. It is made with modular raised square textured 35.125 by 35.125 inches (892.2 by 892.2 mm) granite slabs with a diagonally running zinc canopy demarking the southern edge. There is a movable plinth which serves as a stage for concerts and other performances, a row of lighted fountains set directly into the pavement, a row of small trees along the southern edge, a transparent canopy over the plinth, and an entrance to TMU subway station below. A series of low, circular stone planters was added to the western side of the square in the summer of 2005.

=== Fountains ===
The centrepiece of the square is the array of fountains designed by Dan Euser of Water architecture. Two rows of ten fountains are spread out across the square's main walkway so that visitors have the opportunity to walk through or around the fountains. Unlike many other city fountains, the square's fountains are meant for water play and include a sophisticated filtration system that (according to both of the architects) keeps the water at or above "pool quality" water. According to Euser, the water is treated to maintain health standards for water play. Each of the ten water fountains consists of a stainless steel grille with 30 ground nozzles (arranged in three rows of ten) under it.

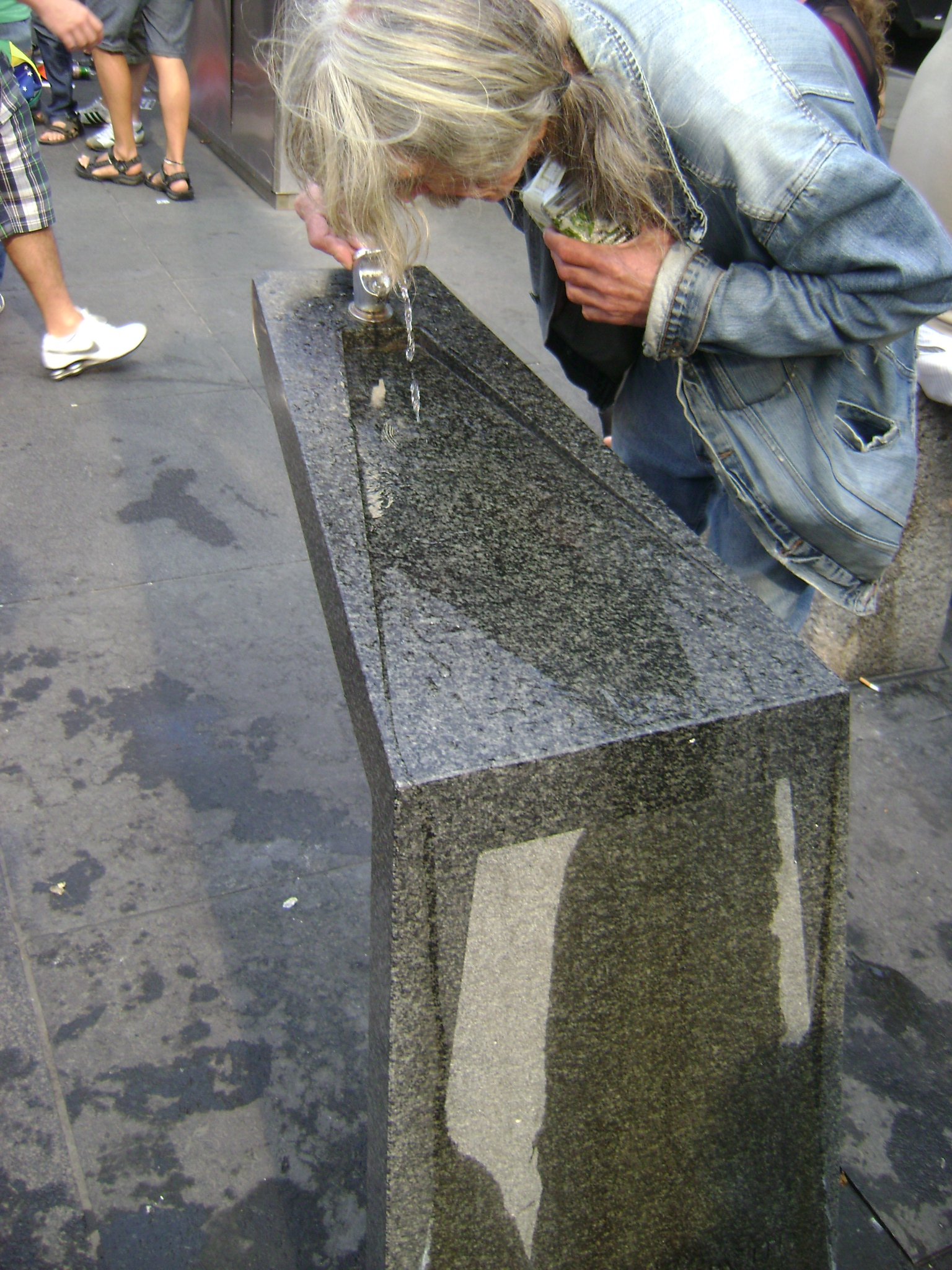
The square features two public drinking fountains.

The entire rock surface is of a very dark (almost black) colour and effectively absorbs sunlight, thus creating a warm surface on which to rest. The water runs under the dark rock slabs and is thus heated by them, so that the fountain water is solar heated. Three curved lighting masts along the south edge of the square, made of hollow structural steel, have a high-gloss white finish that contrasts with the rough non-slip texture of the black granite, and each support six mercury vapour arc lamps that create evening light that comes from approximately the same directions as natural sunlight does during the day (i.e., from various southerly directions).

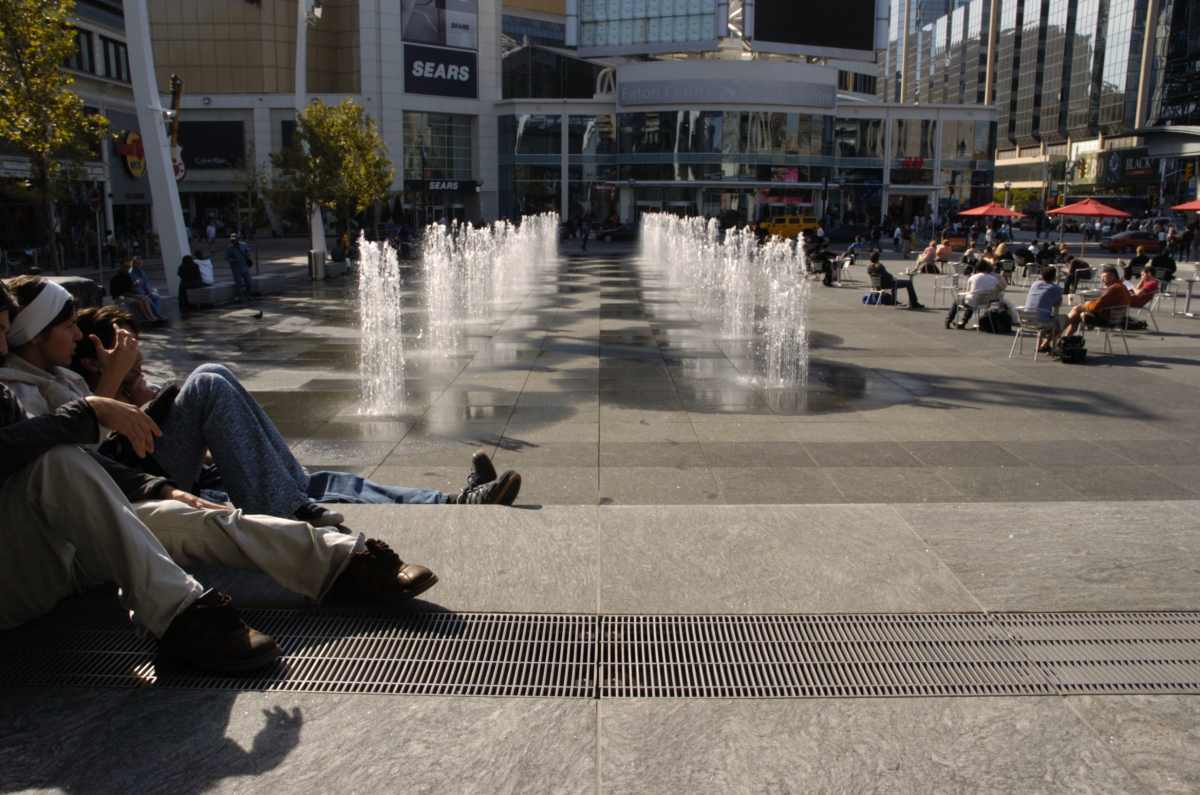
600 ground nozzles are spread out in 20 groups across the square's main walkway

The fountains comprise a dynamic art installation and water sculpture in which the 600 water jets are programmed to vary, dynamically, over time. The fountains usually operate 24 hours a day. Other than the aquatic play area in front of the Ontario Science Centre (the centrepiece of Teluscape), the square is Toronto's only 24-hour waterplay area, open all day and night except during special events, maintenance, and other exceptions. The fountains usually run from around mid-April to the end of October, making this one of two aquatic play areas in Toronto that opens very early in the season and closes very late in the season.

To reduce costs, only the middle channel (the middle ten nozzles of each fountain) can be animated, but the outer two channels can still be globally controlled. The outer two channels are often used to set a background (pedestal) level while the middle channel animates, typically for eight-second intervals. The directionality imposed by the middle channel's sequencer encourages bathers to run west rather than east. Moreover, the sequencer makes the bathing experience optimal for joggers who run west at exactly 20 km/h.

Architects Brown + Storey, fountain creator Dan Euser, the firm that initiated the bidding, former Councillor Kyle Rae, and the management of the square have all confirmed that water play was one of the intended uses of the space. The fountains are intended to appeal to children and adults, and there is evidence that has been realized.

Because many people drink from the ground spray nozzles (some people even fill up water bottles from the ground sprays), and since water play is one of the intended uses, the water is tested daily, between 9 a.m. and 10 a.m., by the Toronto health department. The water is treated with bromine, which many bathers prefer to chlorine. There are three separate water treatment facilities, one for each group of ten west-most nozzles in each grille (200 nozzles total), another for the middle row of ten in each grille, and a third for all of the east-most nozzles. The water that runs into the grilles travels west, under the raised floor of the square's slabs, to the treatment facility under the west end of the water play area.

=== Surrounding buildings ===
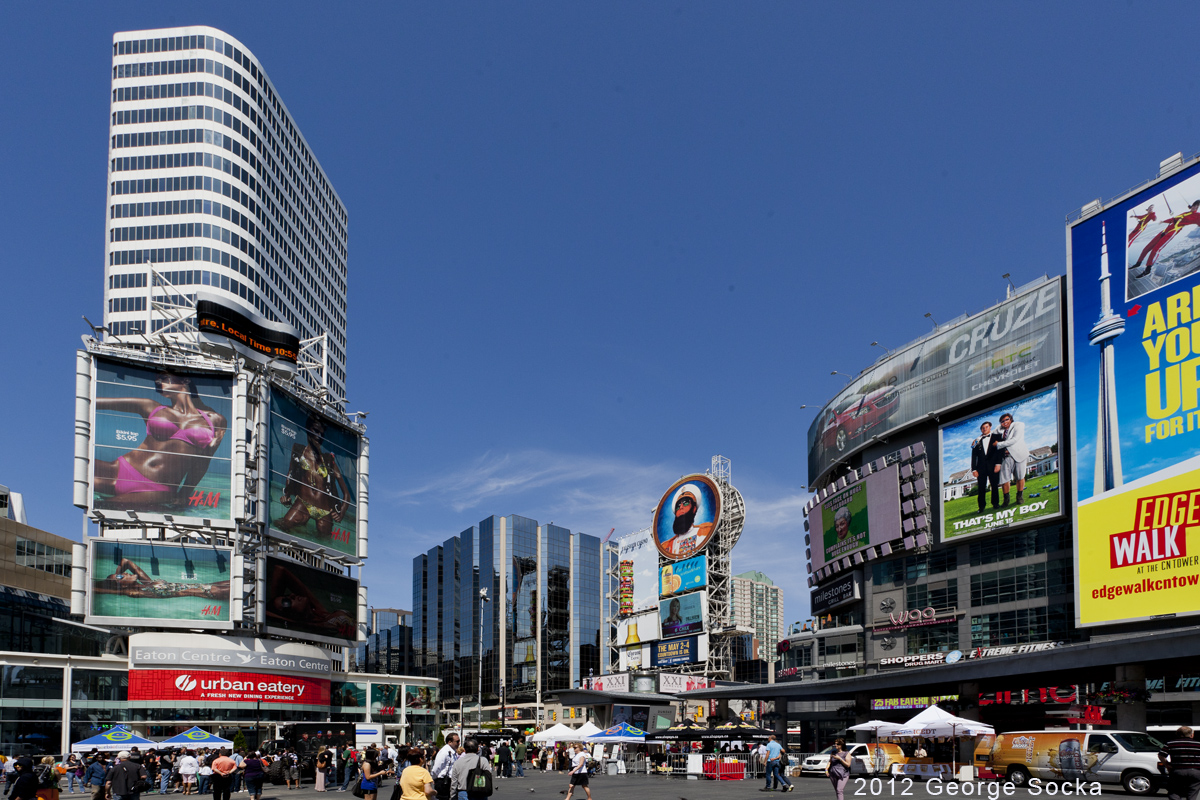
View of the Eaton Centre to the west, and The Tenor to the north of the square. A media tower is located to the northwest of the square.

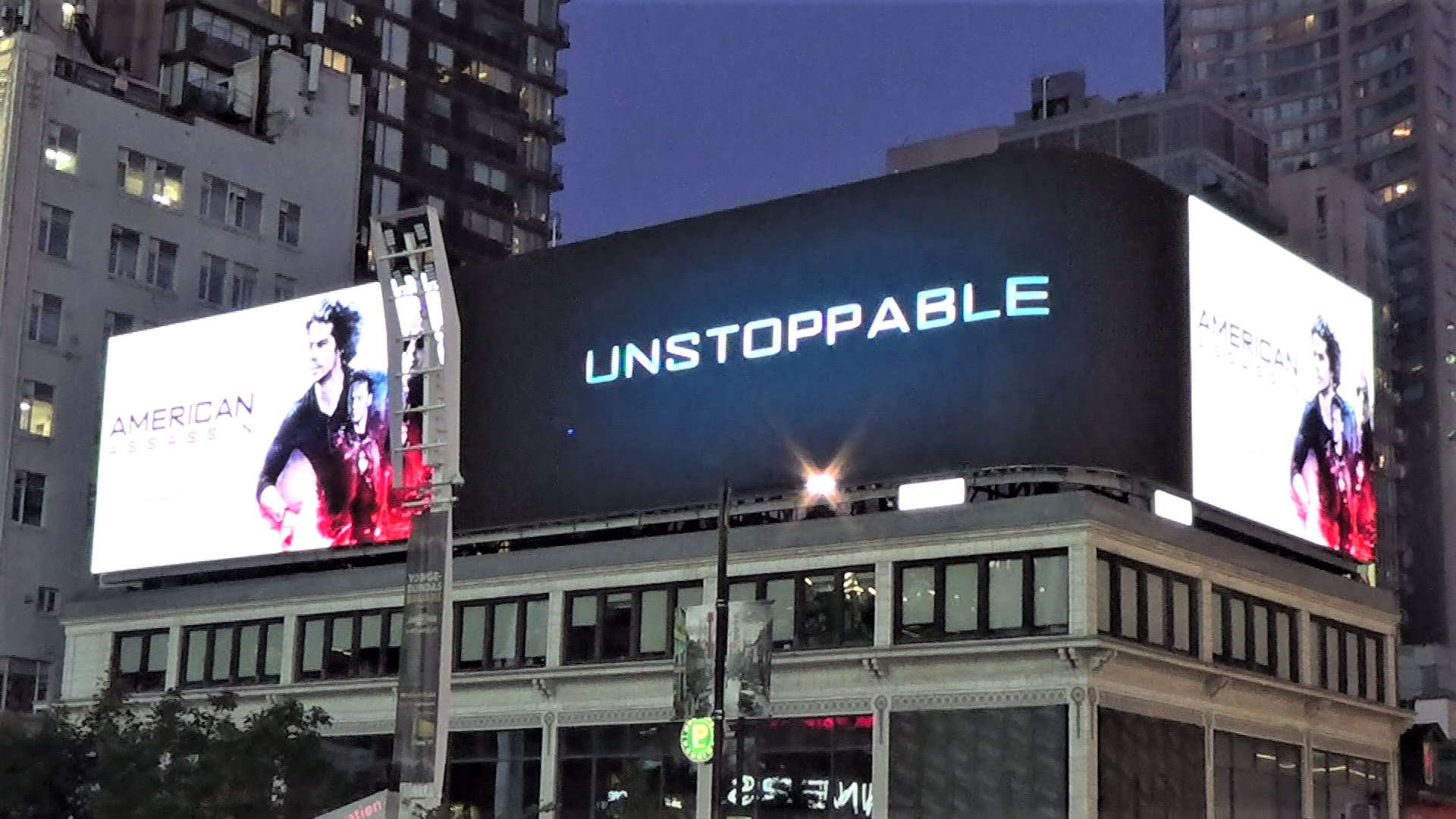
A curved video screen (installed in 2017) atop the building south of the square

Sankofa Square is located within the Downtown Yonge Business Improvement Area (BIA). Other projects in the area include the redevelopment of the Eaton Centre, the construction of a new retail and cinema complex to the north in 2007, called The Tenor (formerly 10 Dundas East, then Toronto Life Square and originally the Metropolis development project), and the opening of 33 Dundas Street East to the southeast (on the corner of Victoria and Dundas), which used to be the home of Olympic Spirit Toronto. On October 22, 2007, Rogers Media announced that it would buy this building as a new home for its Citytv and Omni Television stations. This new studio space is now operational.

Toronto Metropolitan University's campus is located immediately adjacent to Sankofa Square, with most university buildings situated in the blocks northeast of the square in the Garden District. The square functions as an informal entry point to campus, with the Sheldon & Tracy Levy Student Learning Centre and other TMU buildings located just steps north along Yonge Street.

A "media tower" – a scaffold for billboards – has been constructed on the northwest corner of Yonge and Dundas. It is advertised as the tallest media tower in the world. Another large media tower, complete with a video screen, is a major feature of the Rogers Media building on the southeast corner of Dundas Square. The building that was home to the Hard Rock Cafe (now a Shoppers Drug Mart) on the southwest corner of the square originally featured a series of billboards, but these were replaced by a large video screen in 2017. The introduction of the imposing media tower, screens, and brightly illuminated advertising billboards has been too great a sacrifice for some area residents, who feel a loss of the neighbourhood's identity and character.

The redevelopment of the Eaton Centre and the building at Victoria and Dundas were completed in 2004. Toronto Life Square, formerly known as the Metropolis development, began in January 1999 after the City of Toronto expropriated a number of properties, and a phased opening began in 2007. It was renamed "10 Dundas East" after Toronto Life magazine's parent company, St. Joseph Communications, sued to have the magazine's name removed from the building. In 2019, an existing smaller screen and two billboards were replaced by a massive curved video display on the corner of the building facing Yonge and Dundas.

== Management ==
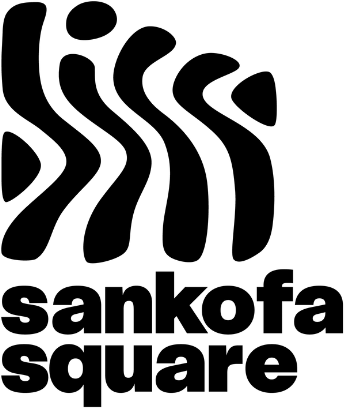
Logo for Sankofa Square since August 2025

Sankofa Square is owned by the City of Toronto and is regulated by Toronto Municipal Code Chapter 636: Public Squares. These regulations govern activities in the square and the use of the property. For example, smoking is prohibited on the entire property of the square. While owned by the City of Toronto, Sankofa Square is not operated by the City of Toronto. Instead, it is operated by a separate Board of Management. The board of management for the square was established in 2001, and is the first public–private partnership in Canada to operate a public square.

The mission of the Sankofa Square Board of Management is "to responsibly manage Sankofa Square and enhance the vitality of downtown; to launch, promote, and operate the Square as an exciting commercial space born from the passion of its community and the energy of commercial participation, so as to develop a positive perception by way of its activities, security, and cleanliness."

== History ==
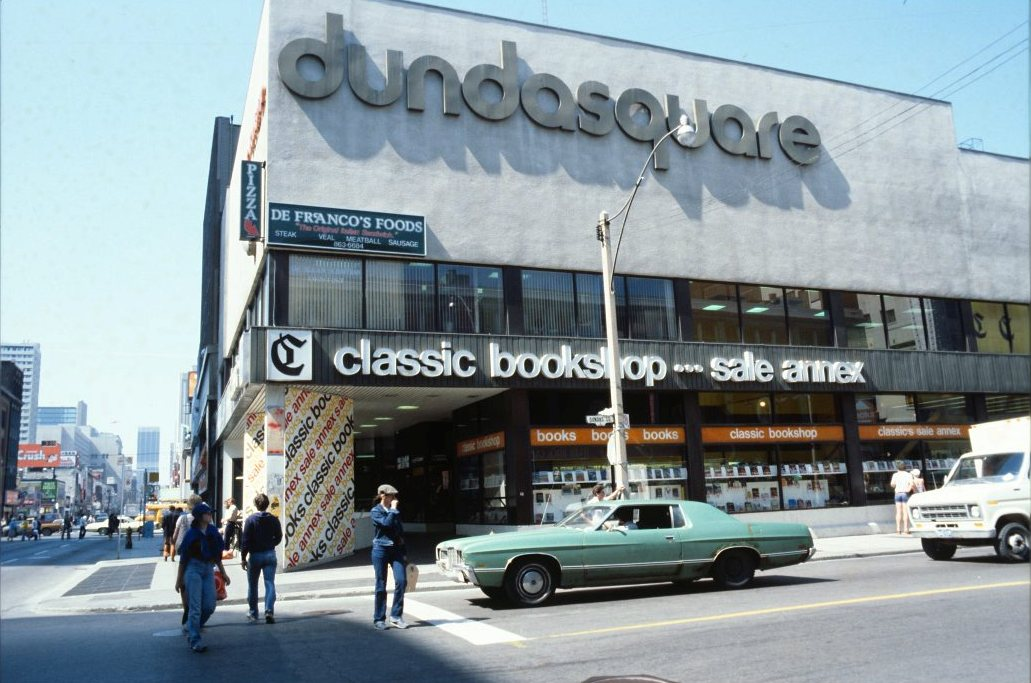
The view in 1979 of the Dundasquare building, which was situated on the future location of the square. The building was demolished in 1998.

In 1996, a partnership between the Downtown Yonge Business and Resident Association and the City of Toronto was formed, known as the Yonge Street Regeneration Project. Its objectives were "to create a renewed sense of place, attract additional retail and entertainment development to the area and to improve its appearance and safety". The centrepiece was a new square at Yonge and Dundas.

In 1998, Toronto City Council approved the expropriation and demolition of the buildings on the site and the construction of the square. The square is a joint project of the city, residents, the McGill Granby Association, the Downtown Yonge Business and Resident Association, and the Downtown Yonge Business Improvement Area, an association of local businesses. This effort was conceived and spearheaded by Arron Barberian of Barberian's Steak House, Robert Sniderman of The Senator restaurant and Councillor Kyle Rae. Ron Soskolne was retained in 1995 to lead the planning of the regeneration project and went on to serve as the chair of the Board of Management for the first decade of the square's operation.

Brown + Storey Architects designed the square. In 1999, the square's design received the Award of Excellence for Significant Building in the Design Stage by Canadian Architect magazine, in recognition of it being an outstanding example of contemporary architecture. The next year, Architecture magazine commended the square as "a new form of urban space with great presence... pushes the limits of invention and originality". In 2006, the square's Wi-Fi hotspot, set up by Wireless Toronto, was voted the best in the city.

Some claim that the intersection is the busiest in Canada, with over 56 million people passing through annually. The square's development is cited as modelling New York's Times Square, Tokyo's Shibuya district, and London's Piccadilly Circus. To manage the volume of pedestrians, a pedestrian scramble was installed in August 2008.

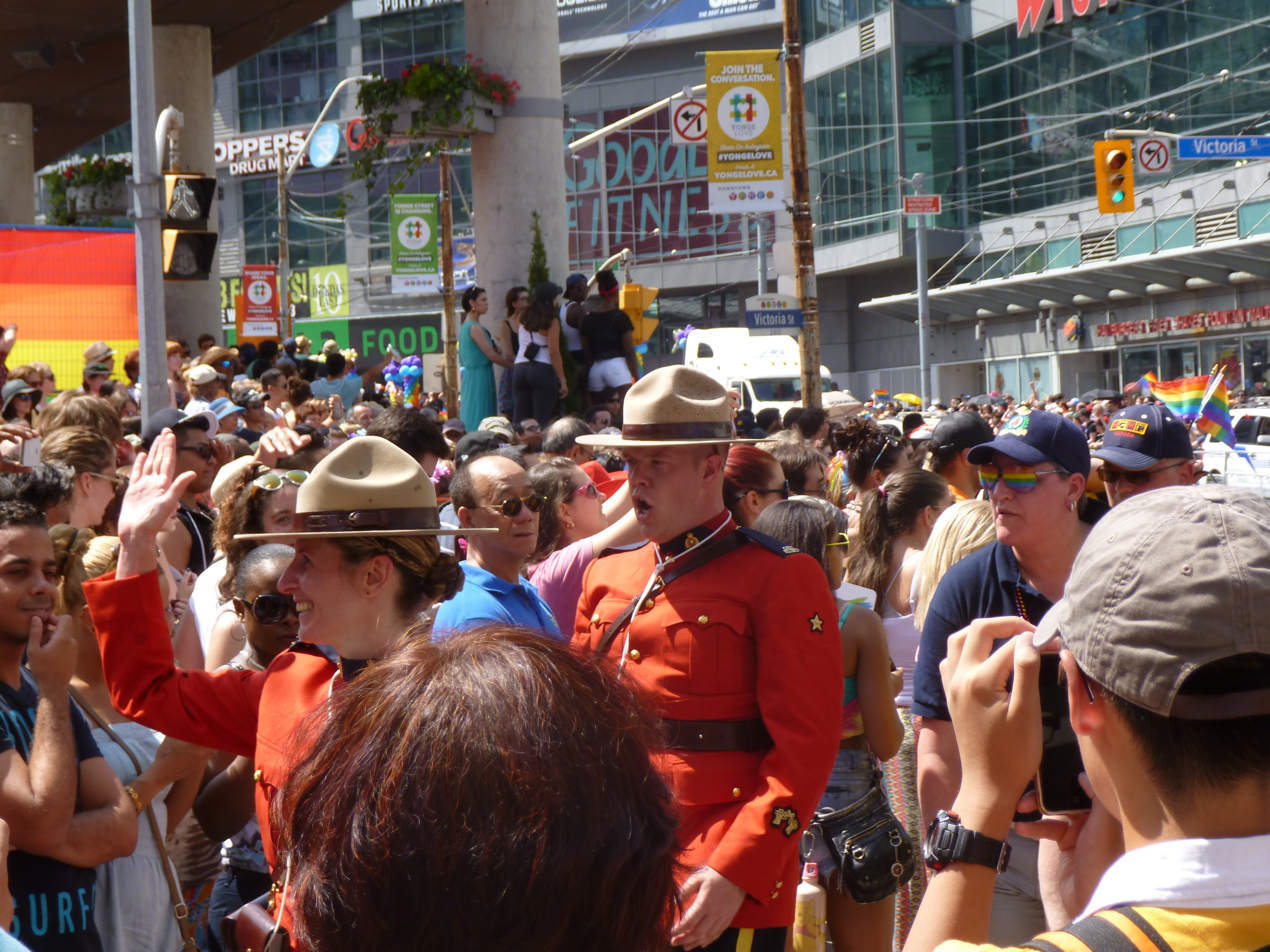
Pride festivities at the northern end of the square, 2014. The square hosted the closing ceremonies for WorldPride.

Sankofa Square frequently serves as a venue for public events connected to the city's cultural festivals, including NXNE, the Toronto International Film Festival, Luminato, Nuit blanche and Pride Week. On June 29, 2014, the square hosted the official closing ceremonies of WorldPride.

=== Official renaming ===
Controversy arose over the namesake of Dundas Street, Henry Dundas, whose amendments to William Wilberforce's abolitionist parliamentary motions delayed the full abolition of slavery in the Slave Trade Act 1807 but which allowed the act to gather the necessary support in Parliament to pass. Toronto City Council voted in 2021 to rename Dundas Street and other civic assets named after Dundas, including Yonge–Dundas Square. While a new name was set to be chosen by April 2022, it was not until December 2023 that City Council approved "Sankofa Square". This name, a Ghanaian term from the Akan people, refers to the act of reflecting on and reclaiming teachings from the past. The chair and vice-chair of the Yonge-Dundas Square Board of Management resigned over the concerns of how the naming was handled.

Citing costs, in December 2023, Toronto opted to keep Dundas' name for the street, but to rename Yonge–Dundas Square, the Dundas and Dundas West subway stations, and the Jane–Dundas branch of the Toronto Public Library.

In May 2025, the Toronto Transit Commission (TTC) board approved a proposal to change Dundas station's name to TMU station. It is named after the nearby Toronto Metropolitan University (TMU), which covered the cost of renaming the station. The name change took effect in February 2026, in conjunction with other changes to the subway system.

An official grand opening for the new name was held on August 23, 2025. The grand opening featured Caribbean short films, live music, an artisan and vendor market, and basketball clinics presented by the Toronto Tempo and Toronto Raptors.

== Criticism ==
Criticism ranges from suggestions that the city has missed an opportunity for more green space within the downtown core (or that they have missed an opportunity for what some critics consider more interesting architectural elements) to questions of what the true intent is behind the ostensibly public square. The Toronto Public Space Committee and organizers of Toronto iterations of the Reclaim The Streets phenomenon often point to the square as an example of what they consider a negative trend in urban planning.

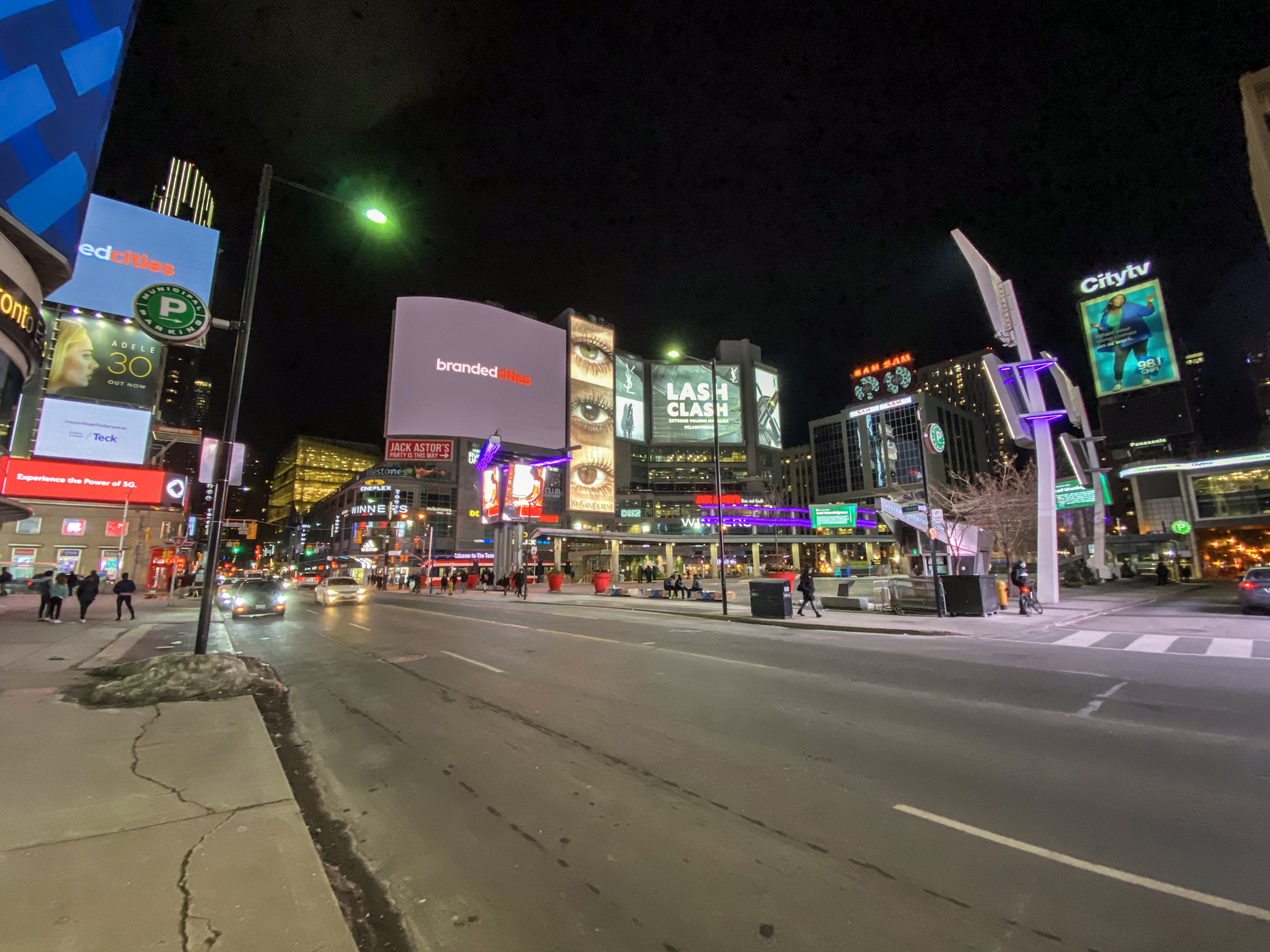
The square at night in 2022

The square is surrounded on all sides by gigantic commercial billboards in a redevelopment scheme modeled on New York City's Times Square or London's Piccadilly Circus.

=== Dispute over the 'Sankofa' renaming and Dundas's legacy ===
Criticism also arose about the renaming of the square to Sankofa Square. Suggestions have been made that Sankofa has little connection to Toronto. Others have felt that naming the square after a historic figure or event may be more appropriate. Some question whether the objection to Dundas is too harsh. Dundas felt that there was not yet enough support in the House of Commons and House of Lords for the British Empire to abolish slavery and that it would be ineffective. Britain would later vote to fully abolish slavery with the Slavery Abolition Act 1833.

Former city councillor Ceta Ramkhalawansingh, who was in the advisory committee responsible for developing new names for Dundas Street and other related properties, criticized the lack of community input into renaming the square, the lack of public consultation and the motion tabled by Councillor Chris Moise that effectively disbanded the committee.

Some academics in Canada, including Melanie Newton and Andrew Lochhead, have defended the renaming and criticized arguments portraying Henry Dundas as a gradual abolitionist and rebuked the claims that associate Akan people of Ghana with slave traders. In a letter sent to Toronto City Council's executive committee in 2024, Newton, a Professor of History at University of Toronto, has described aforementioned claims as "outrageously inaccurate historic claims", and "hateful, ill-informed and dishonest rhetoric," stating that "to suggest that Akan people were responsible for their own enslavement is to perpetuate the racist myth – which Henry Dundas himself also propagated in speeches in the House of Commons – that Africans were responsible for their own enslavement."

Different research have noted that Akan people have been both victims of and participants in the practice of slavery, with over 2 million estimated Akan speakers enslaved in the trans-Atlantic slave trade. The same research, Schramm (2005), stated that the name "Sankofa" encapsulated the tradition of African resistance to enslavement, and is also the title of Ethiopian filmmaker Haile Gerima's 1993 film depicting African resistance to slavery and Atlantic slave trade. Historians in the UK and the US including David Brion Davis, Robin Blackburn, have argued that Henry Dundas delayed abolition and that he suggested possibilities for indefinite delay of the slave trade by making it dependent on colonial reforms. Other historians including Angela McCarthy and Sir Tom Devine argue that Dundas's actions were not singularly determinative of the course of events, and that blaming Dundas solely ignores the wider political and economic factors that were the true causes of delay.

== See also ==
- Albert Campbell Square
- Mel Lastman Square
- Nathan Phillips Square
- Pecaut Square
- List of city squares
