= Barrie Police Service =

Police agency of Barrie, Ontario, Canada

Barrie Police Service Service de police de Barrie
- Motto: Committed to our community

Agency overview
- Formed: 1853

Jurisdictional structure
- Operations jurisdiction: Barrie, Ontario, Canada
- Constituting instrument: Community Safety and Policing Act, 2019 (SO 2019, c. 1, Sched. 1)
- General nature: Local civilian police

Operational structure
- Headquarters: Barrie, Ontario
- Sworn members: 238
- Unsworn members: 109
- Elected officer responsible: Hon. Michael Kerzner, Solicitor General of Ontario
- Agency executive: Rich Johnston, Chief of police

Facilities
- Headquarters: 1

Website
- www.barriepolice.ca

The Barrie Police Service (BPS; French: Service de police de Barrie) is the police service of the city of Barrie, Ontario, Canada. It is made up of 238 police personnel and 109 civilians that serve a population of 135,711, as of 2011, in an area covering 100.71 km^{2} (38.88 sq mi).

The chief of police is the highest-ranking officer of the Barrie Police Service. The current chief is Rich Johnston.

== History ==
The Barrie Police Service is the third-oldest police force still in existence in Ontario, after the Kingston Police Service (1841) and the Hamilton Police Service (1833).

=== Past police chiefs ===
- Rich Johnston, 2022-present
- Kimberley Greenwood, 2013–2022
- Mark Neelin, 2010–2013
- Wayne Frechette, 2000–2010
- Jack Delcourt, 1985–2000
- Earl Snider, 1976–1985
- Ed Tschirhart, 1956–1976 - former with Kitchener force
- OPP contract, 1946–1956
  - H.H. Peel, Barrie Detachment Commander Sergeant
  - Morley Wright - Detachment Commander Sergeant
- James Case, acting chief, 1946
- B.B. Burtchael, 1945
- Alexander Stewart, 1924–1945
- James Case, 1923–1924
- Robert King, 1888–1923
- Chief Constable Joseph Rogers, 1853–1888

== Controversies ==
- In 2008 a senior police inspector in charge of the Barrie Police Service Professional Standards Branch was relieved of his duties after emailing a racist joke to colleagues.
- In 2009 an attempted obstruction of justice was reported after senior Barrie Police Service officials initially failed to disclose and then subsequently refused to disclose the existence of criminal charges against one of their constables, which included, drug possession and trafficking, cocaine use while on duty, theft (stealing money and phone cards from an evidence bag), and obstruction of justice.
- In 2010 a Barrie police constable, Jason Nevill, assaulted and arrested a man under false charges. After the incident was caught on a security camera and caused public outcry, he was later found guilty of causing bodily harm, unlawful use of authority and obstruction of evidence. Following a one-year jail sentence, Nevill resigned from the police force.
- In 2021 the Ontario Provincial Police opened an investigation into the violent arrest of a 20-year-old skateboarder by Barrie police officers after video of the incident was shared on social media.

== See also ==
- Integrated Security Unit
