= Statistics of the COVID-19 pandemic in Ontario =

The following are statistics relating to the COVID-19 pandemic in Ontario.

== New cases (2020) ==
View source data.

== New cases (2021) ==
View source data.

== New cases (2022) ==
View source data.

== Confirmed deaths (2020) ==
View source data.

== Confirmed deaths (2021) ==
View source data.

== Confirmed deaths (2022) ==
View source data.

== Active cases (2020) ==
View source data.

== Active cases (2021) ==
View source data.

== Active cases (2022) ==
View source data.

== Geographical distribution ==
Public health unit	Cases	Cases per m	Resolved	Deaths	Deaths per m
Algoma	2,922	25,839	2,359	21	186
Brant County (including Brantford)	8,294	61,525	7,222	44	326
Chatham-Kent	5,120	50,175	4,312	44	431
Durham Region	46,112	71,396	39,164	396	613
Eastern Ontario (Stormont, Dundas and Glengarry-Prescott and Russell)	11,140	54,941	9,339	151	745
Grey-Bruce	4,855	29,973	4,399	36	222
Haldimand-Norfolk	5,687	51,800	4,827	75	683
Haliburton, Kawartha, Pine Ridge District	5,165	28,841	4,272	73	408
Halton Region	36,184	65,977	32,119	268	489
Hamilton	41,709	77,682	36,580	431	803
Hastings Prince Edward	5,109	31,697	4,030	24	149
Huron-Perth	4,527	33,264	3,958	78	573
Kingston, Frontenac and Lennox & Addington	7,928	41,001	7,055	26	134
Lambton County	7,748	61,182	6,610	94	742
Leeds, Grenville & Lanark District	4,871	28,781	4,233	67	396
Middlesex-London	25,985	57,044	22,599	270	593
Niagara Region	28,391	63,389	24,871	463	1,034
North Bay-Parry Sound (including most of Nipissing District)	2,281	18,422	1,982	9	73
Northwestern (Most of Kenora District, Rainy River District and part of Thunder Bay District)	2,647	34,622	2,072	11	144
Ottawa	53,067	56,802	47,045	648	694
Peel	154,083	111,514	141,116	1,049	759
Peterborough (City and County)	4,355	31,504	3,647	38	275
Porcupine (Cochrane District, Hornepayne, James Bay communities, Timiskaming panhandle)	3,780	44,893	3,251	33	392
Renfrew County & District	2,329	22,482	1,881	17	164
Simcoe-Muskoka	28,285	52,355	24,604	296	548
Southwestern (Oxford, Elgin, St. Thomas)	9,102	45,546	8,016	128	641
Sudbury & Districts (including Greater Sudbury)	7,634	38,860	6,053	67	341
Thunder Bay District (including First Nations communities in the far north)	5,658	37,252	4,744	72	474
Timiskaming (including Temagami)	854	25,840	697	5	151
Toronto	252,101	92,292	228,441	3,792	1,388
Waterloo Region	34,544	64,550	29,442	327	611
Wellington-Dufferin-Guelph	15,774	55,452	14,209	131	461
Windsor-Essex County	31,229	78,277	27,559	521	1,306
York Region	88,612	79,837	80,365	900	811

Updated as of January 16, 2022

== Demographic distribution ==
Age range	Cases	Cases per m	Resolved	Male	Female	Gender diverse	Unspecified sex	Deaths	Deaths per m	Lethality (‰)	Male deaths	Female deaths	Male deaths per m	Female deaths per m
19 and under	89,882	28,625	45,099	46,141	43,083	6	652	5	1.6	0.004	2	3	1.2	2.0
20-29	117,274	56,382	67,634	61,482	54,723	8	1061	27	13	0.02	19	7	18	7
30-39	90,306	45,725	51,400	45,593	44,064	7	642	62	31	0.04	42	16	43	14
40-49	79,292	42,861	45,945	37,939	40,904	6	443	148	80	0.14	97	49	108	52
50-59	78,134	37,929	47,202	38,287	39,472	4	371	468	227	0.49	305	160	299	155
60-69	48,887	28,757	29,543	25,321	23,344	2	220	1,101	648	4.45	726	367	875	412
70-79	24,324	22,316	14,642	12,090	12,141	1	92	1,935	1,775	8.39	1,181	748	2,316	1,290
80-89	16,602	32,553	10,451	6,605	9,904	0	93	3,188	6,251	19.74	1,573	1,595	7,282	5,389
90 and over	8,651	66,546	5,426	2,380	6,223	0	48	2,477	19,054	28.97	848	1,611	21,200	17,900
Unknown	97		66	32	24	0	29	1	0	0	0	0	0	
Totals	553,450	37,999	317,408	269,803	268,066	34	3,651	9,412	646	2.14	4,793	4,556	666	618

Updated as of August 10, 2021

== Ontario public school and childcare centre statistics ==
COVID-19 in Ontario public schools	#	Ref
Current number of schools with cases	1,097	
Current number of schools closed	N/A (schools currently on Winter break)	
Cumulative total (total number of cases reported in schools)	27,064	
COVID-19 in Ontario daycare centres	#	Ref
Current number of childcare centres with cases	440	
Current number of childcare centres closed	43	
Cumulative total (total number of cases reported in childcare centres)	10,202	

Data as of December 24, 2021
