= Vera Etches =

Canadian physician

Ottawa Medical Officer of Health
- In office April 2018 – March 2025
- Preceded by: Isra Levy
- Succeeded by: Trevor Arnason (interim)

CEO of the Children's Hospital of Eastern Ontario
- Incumbent
- Assumed office March 3, 2025
- Preceded by: Alex Munter

Personal details
- Born: 1975 (age 50–51) New Zealand
- Education: Simon Fraser University, BSc; University of British Columbia, M.D. University of Toronto, MHSc
- Occupation: Physician

Vera G. Etches (born 1975) is a Canadian physician and public health expert who served as Ottawa's medical officer of health from 2018 to 2025, the first woman to hold the position. She is best known for leading the city's public health response to the COVID-19 pandemic. In March 2025, she became the president and chief executive officer of the Children's Hospital of Eastern Ontario (CHEO).

== Early life and education ==
Etches was born in 1975 in New Zealand to Duncan and Nora Etches. Her parents were both physicians who were completing their medical residencies at the time. By 1977, the family had moved to Hazelton, British Columbia where her parents worked at the local hospital.

At the age of 16, Etches enrolled at Simon Fraser University, where she completed a Bachelor of Science. She completed a medical doctorate at the University of British Columbia and a masters of health science and a fellowship in community medicine at the University of Toronto.

Etches had initially intended to be a rural family physician. However, she took an interest in public health following a university course in Malawi where she saw health workers addressing societal problems such as childhood malnutrition in order to effect better health outcomes.

== Medical career ==
From 2005 to 2009, Etches served as the associate medical officer of health, acting medical officer of health, and director of clinical services at the Sudbury & District Health Unit.

Etches became the associate medical officer of health at Ottawa Public Health (OPH) in February 2009, just four months before H1N1 was declared a pandemic. In 2014, she was appointed deputy medical officer of health. In April 2018, Etches was appointed medical officer of health at OPH, the first woman to hold the role.

=== COVID-19 ===
Etches headed Ottawa's public health response to the COVID-19 pandemic and modelled her response after Sheela Basrur, who was Ontario's Chief Medical Officer of Health during the 2003 SARS outbreak. During this time, she earned a reputation for her direct style of communication. In a press briefing on March 15, 2020, was among the first public officials in Canada to warn that COVID-19 had spread to Canada and that community transmission was occurring. She also maintained an active presence on Twitter, something that had become standard practice following the 2009 H1N1 pandemic.

Over the course of the pandemic, Etches issued several Class Section 22 orders under the Health Protection and Promotion Act. On September 22, 2020, for example, she issued an order requiring Ottawa residents to self-isolate for 14 days or until they received a negative test result from a COVID-19 test if they had COVID-19 symptoms or had been exposed to the virus. In 2021, she ordered capacity limits for outdoor skating rinks, winter trails, and tobogganing hills, as well as masking requirements for playgrounds.

=== CHEO ===
On December 6, 2024, the Children's Hospital of Eastern Ontario (CHEO) announced that Etches would take over as its president and chief executive officer effective March 3, 2025, following the departure of Alex Munter.

== Academic career ==
Etches is an adjunct professor with the School of Epidemiology and Public Health at the University of Ottawa.

== Personal life ==
Etches is married and has two children.

== Awards and recognition ==
In June 2021, Etches was awarded an honorary doctorate from Algonquin College. In June 2022, Etches was awarded an honorary doctorate from the University of Ottawa. Later that month, the City of Ottawa awarded her the Key to the City for her efforts during the COVID-19 pandemic.

== Publications ==
- Etches, Vera, John Frank, Erica Di Ruggiero, and Doug Manuel. "Measuring population health: a review of indicators." Annual Review of Public Health 27, no. 1 (2006): 29–55.
- Green, Michael E., Erica Weir, William Hogg, Vera Etches, Kieran Moore, Duncan Hunter, and Richard Birtwhistle. "Improving collaboration between public health and family health teams in Ontario." Healthcare Policy 8, no. 3 (2013): e93.
- Mann, Tara A., Zhaida Uddin, Andrew M. Hendriks, Christiane J. Bouchard, and Vera G. Etches. "Get Tested Why Not? A novel approach to internet-based chlamydia and gonorrhea testing in Canada." Canadian Journal of Public Health 104 (2013): e205-e209.
- O’Byrne, Patrick, Jacqueline Willmore, Alyssa Bryan, Dara S. Friedman, Andrew Hendriks, Cynthia Horvath, Dominique Massenat, Christiane Bouchard, Robert S. Remis, and Vera Etches. "Nondisclosure prosecutions and population health outcomes: examining HIV testing, HIV diagnoses, and the attitudes of men who have sex with men following nondisclosure prosecution media releases in Ottawa, Canada." BMC Public Health 13 (2013): 1–14.
- O'Byrne, Patrick, Alyssa Bryan, Andrew Hendriks, Cynthia Horvath, Christiane Bouchard, and Vera Etches. "Social marginalization and internal exclusion: Gay men's understandings and experiences of community." Canadian Journal of Nursing Research Archive (2014): 57–79.
- Willmore, Jacqueline, Edward Ellis, Vera Etches, Lise Labrecque, Carla Osiowy, Anton Andonov, Cameron McDermaid et al. "Public Health Response to a Large‐scale Endoscopy Infection Control Lapse in a Nonhospital Clinic." Canadian Journal of Infectious Diseases and Medical Microbiology 26, no. 2 (2015): 77–84.
- Kothari, Anita, Ruta Valaitis, Vera Etches, Marc Lefebvre, Cal Martell, Sinéad McElhone, Ruth Sanderson, and Louise Simmons. "How political science can contribute to public health: a response to Gagnon and colleagues." International Journal of Health Policy and Management 7, no. 3 (2017): 288.
- Valaitis, Ruta Kristina, Vera Etches, Amira Ali, Anita Kothari, Lise Labreque, Marc Lefebvre, Cal Martell et al. "Collaboration between Local Public Health Units and Regional Health Authorities in Canada for Integrated Health System Planning Using a Population Health Approach." International Journal of Integrated Care 18, no. S2 (2018): 177.
- Persaud, Sydney, Monica Armstrong, Clare Liddy, Vera Etches, Claire Kendall, and Kady Carr. "Geospatial analysis of neighbourhood-level primary care attachment in Ottawa, Canada." Annals of Family Medicine 22, no. Supplement 1 (2024).
