= COVID-19 pandemic in the Regional Municipality of York =

Ongoing COVID-19 viral pandemic in York Region, Ontario

- Disease: COVID-19
- Pathogen: SARS-CoV-2
- Location: Regional Municipality of York, Ontario, Canada
- Confirmed cases: 69,733
- Active cases: 6,839
- Recovered: 62,111
- Deaths: 783
- Fatality rate: 1.12%

Government website
- york.ca/covid19

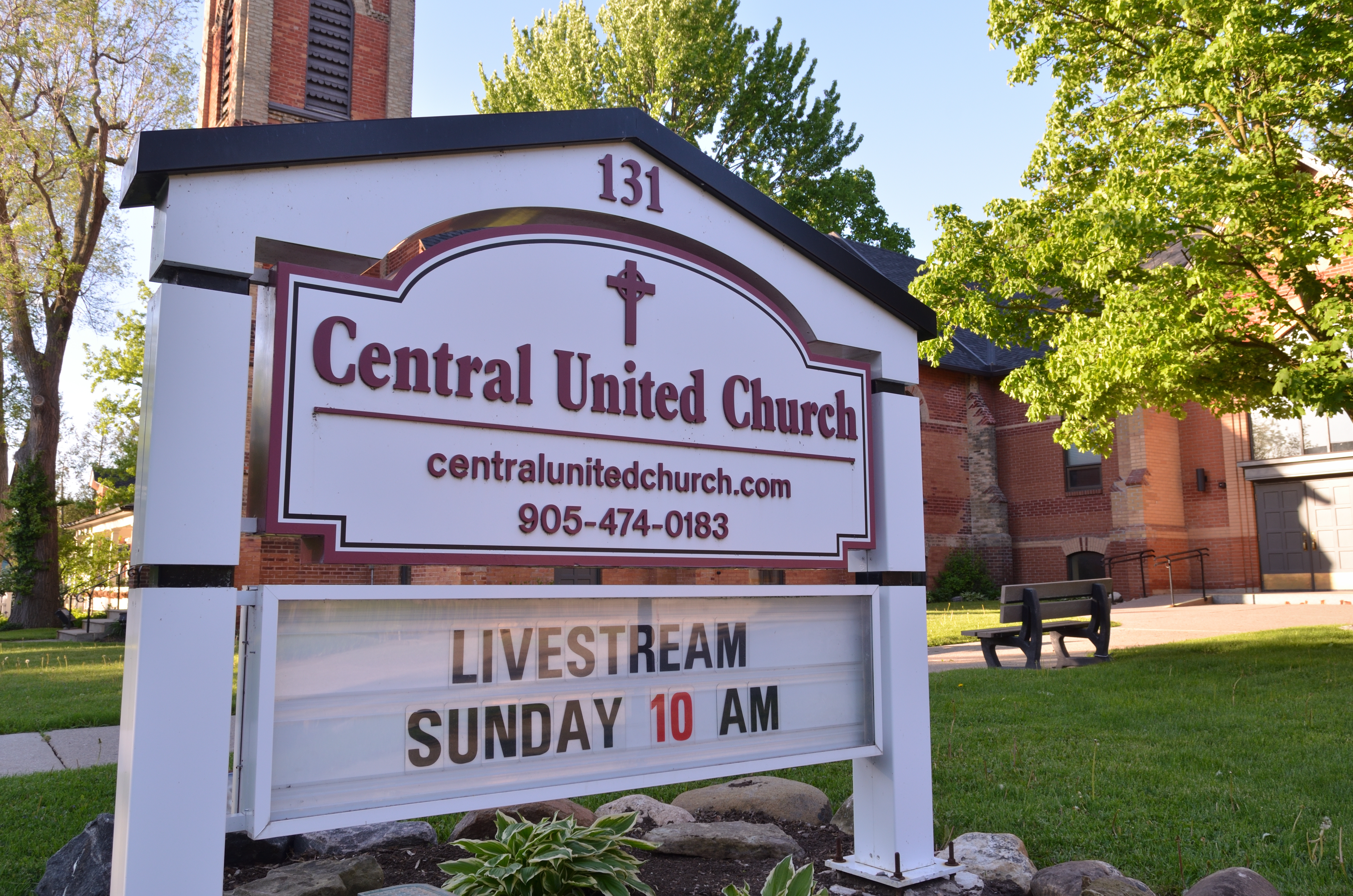
Sunday service at Central United Church in the Markham neighbourhood of Unionville is livestreamed online during the pandemic

The COVID-19 pandemic is a viral pandemic of coronavirus disease 2019 (COVID-19), a novel infectious disease caused by severe acute respiratory syndrome coronavirus 2 (SARS-CoV-2). This pandemic has affected the Regional Municipality of York since early 2020 and has led to lockdowns as well as stay-at-home orders made by the Government of Ontario. A vaccination program began in December 2020 and is currently ongoing.

== Background ==
On March 18, 2020, the municipalities of Aurora and Newmarket declared an emergency due to increasing community spread of COVID-19. By the next week, the provincial government declared an emergency and imposed immediate public health measures.

== Timeline ==
=== February 2020 ===
February 25 – a woman from Iran returning to York Region tests positive for COVID-19. This was the first case reported in York Region.

=== March 2020 ===
March 23 – the provincial government orders all non-essential businesses (e.g. restaurants, mall retail) to close. Gathering limits are introduced. Due to the hardship imposed on businesses, subsidies and financial relief measures were introduced.

=== April 2020 ===
April 10 – an outbreak at Participation House, a care home takes place. Participation House is a care home for adults with developmental disabilities.

== Government response ==
=== Transit ===
As a result of the COVID-19 pandemic leading to a lockdown, York Region Transit reduced service. School routes were cancelled. To reduce contact between the driver and passengers, boarding was done at the back door and fares were not collected until July 2, 2020, when front-door boarding resumed.

== Impacts ==
=== Business closures and cancellations ===
COVID-19 has led to shutdowns of non-essential businesses in York Region, such as restaurants, movie theatres and gyms. This happened at the beginning of the pandemic in March 2020. By July 2020, non-essential businesses were permitted to open in stage 3, but were closed again on October 19, 2020.

=== Schools ===
At the beginning of the pandemic in 2020, COVID-19 forced schools in York Region to close for the rest of the academic year.

== See also ==
- COVID-19 pandemic in Canada
- COVID-19 pandemic in Ontario
- COVID-19 pandemic in Ottawa
- COVID-19 pandemic in the Regional Municipality of Peel
- COVID-19 pandemic in Toronto
