= COVID-19 pandemic in Ottawa =

- Disease: COVID-19
- Pathogen: SARS-CoV-2
- Location: Ottawa, Ontario, Canada
- First outbreak: Wuhan, Hubei, China
- Arrival date: March 11, 2020
- Date: December 12, 2021
- Confirmed cases: 32,737
- Active cases: 611
- Recovered: 31,508
- Deaths: 618
- Fatality rate: 2.12%

Government website
- Ottawa Public Health

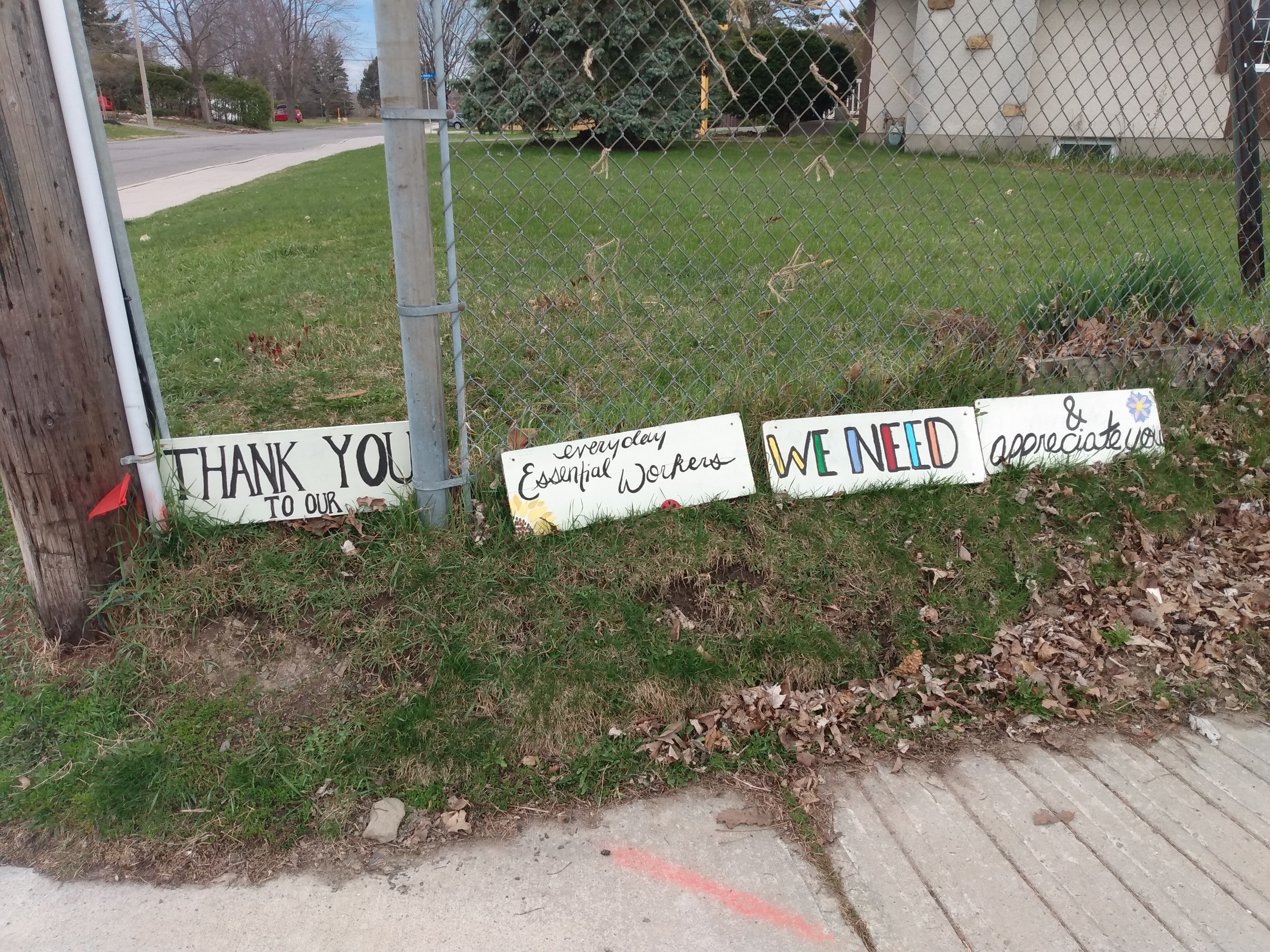
An impromptu message left for essential workers near the Ottawa General Hospital, May 2020.

The COVID-19 pandemic in Ottawa was a part of the COVID-19 pandemic in Canada, which was caused by COVID-19, a novel infectious disease caused by SARS-CoV-2. Ottawa is the fourth most populous city in Canada, the second largest city in Ontario, and the capital city of Canada.

On March 11, 2020, the first identified case of COVID-19 in Ottawa was a man in his 40s who travelled to Austria, stated Ottawa's medical officer of health, Dr. Vera Etches. It was found to be a travel-related case, showing that there was no evidence of community spread of SARS-CoV-2 in Ottawa. On March 25, 2020, Mayor Jim Watson declared a local state of emergency, eight days after Premier Doug Ford declared a provincial state of emergency. Initial restrictions preventing essential businesses from operating (such as the closure of indoor dining and personal care services) continued through until June 12, 2020, when the government of Ontario allowed Ottawa to enter Stage 2 of reopening. Ottawa Public Health announced that masks are mandatory in all public indoor settings on July 15, 2020. On July 17, 2020, Ottawa was allowed into Stage 3 of reopening.

Starting in the early summer of 2020, Ottawa saw a significant decline of new cases. Along with other areas of Canada, cases began to steadily rise in late summer and early autumn. Ottawa, Peel Region, York Region and Toronto began to face restrictions based on rising viral spread and were initially knocked back into a modified Stage 2 tier until the province introduced a new colour-coded Response Framework for the province involving five tiers based on regional COVID-19 numbers. Ottawa had its modified Stage 2 status lifted for parts of November, until the province declared a province-wide shutdown beginning December 26, 2020. This included the declaration of a second state of emergency in January 2021 and stay-at-home orders for the entire province. Ottawa's stay-at-home orders were lifted on February 16, 2021, and Ottawa was moved into the "Orange-Restrict" category of prevention measures.

== Vaccine rollout ==
In December 2020, Health Canada approved the Pfizer–BioNTech COVID-19 vaccine and the mRNA-1273 vaccine developed by Moderna. Widespread plans for COVID-19 vaccinations across Canada and the province began during the week of December 14, 2020. On February 26, 2021, Health Canada approved the Oxford–AstraZeneca COVID-19 vaccine for use. In Ottawa, the first vaccine was administered at the Ottawa Hospital - Civic Campus, on December 15, 2020. It was the Pfizer–BioNTech COVID-19 vaccine, as the mRNA-1273 vaccine developed by Moderna was administered at a later date. Vaccine rollout plans for Ottawa started for only Long Term Care (LTC) residents, staff, and certain health-care workers, but slowly expanded to a larger range. As of March 5, 2021, adults 90 years of age or older anywhere in the city can receive their COVID-19 vaccine, along with the Inuit, First Nations, and Métis populations. Adults 80 years of age or older living in certain high-risk neighbourhoods can receive their vaccine doses. Residents in Ottawa shelters can also receive a COVID-19 vaccine dose. On May 18, vaccines became available to all Ontarians over 18. All available appointments in Ottawa were booked up in just two and half hours. Multiple pop-up vaccine clinics have opened in the city. As of May 25, 2020, all residents twelve and over, can book a vaccine appointment.

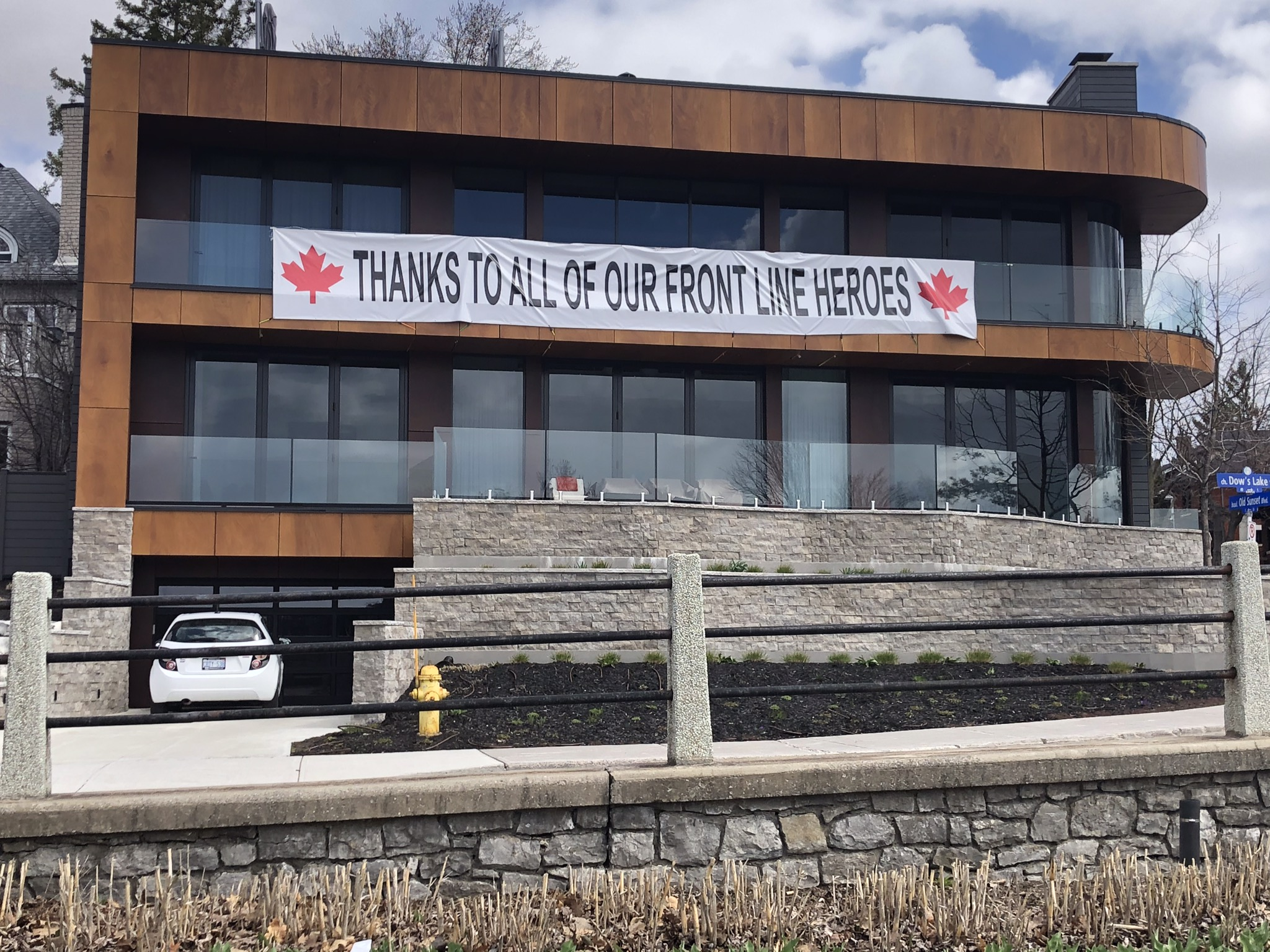
Sign thanking essential workers, on a building overlooking Dow's Lake.

=== Mass vaccination ===
On March 12, 2021, one of Ottawa's first mass vaccination sites opened at the Queensway-Carleton Hospital. The site is currently open to anyone eligible, (Note: Anyone 12 and over.) and is appointment-only. The hospital plans to administer 1,100 daily doses at its peak.

== Timeline ==
=== 2020 ===
==== March ====
On March 11, the first identified COVID-19 case in Ottawa was recorded. It was found to be a travel-related case, showing no evidence that there was community spread of SARS-CoV-2 in Ottawa.

On March 13, the city's first COVID-19 Assessment Centre opens at Brewer Arena.

On March 16, the city closed all municipal facilities. They would remain closed until June 2020.

On March 25, Ottawa Mayor Jim Watson declares a state of emergency. On the same day, Ottawa has its first confirmed COVID-19 death when a man in his 90s dies at the Ottawa Hospital.

==== April ====
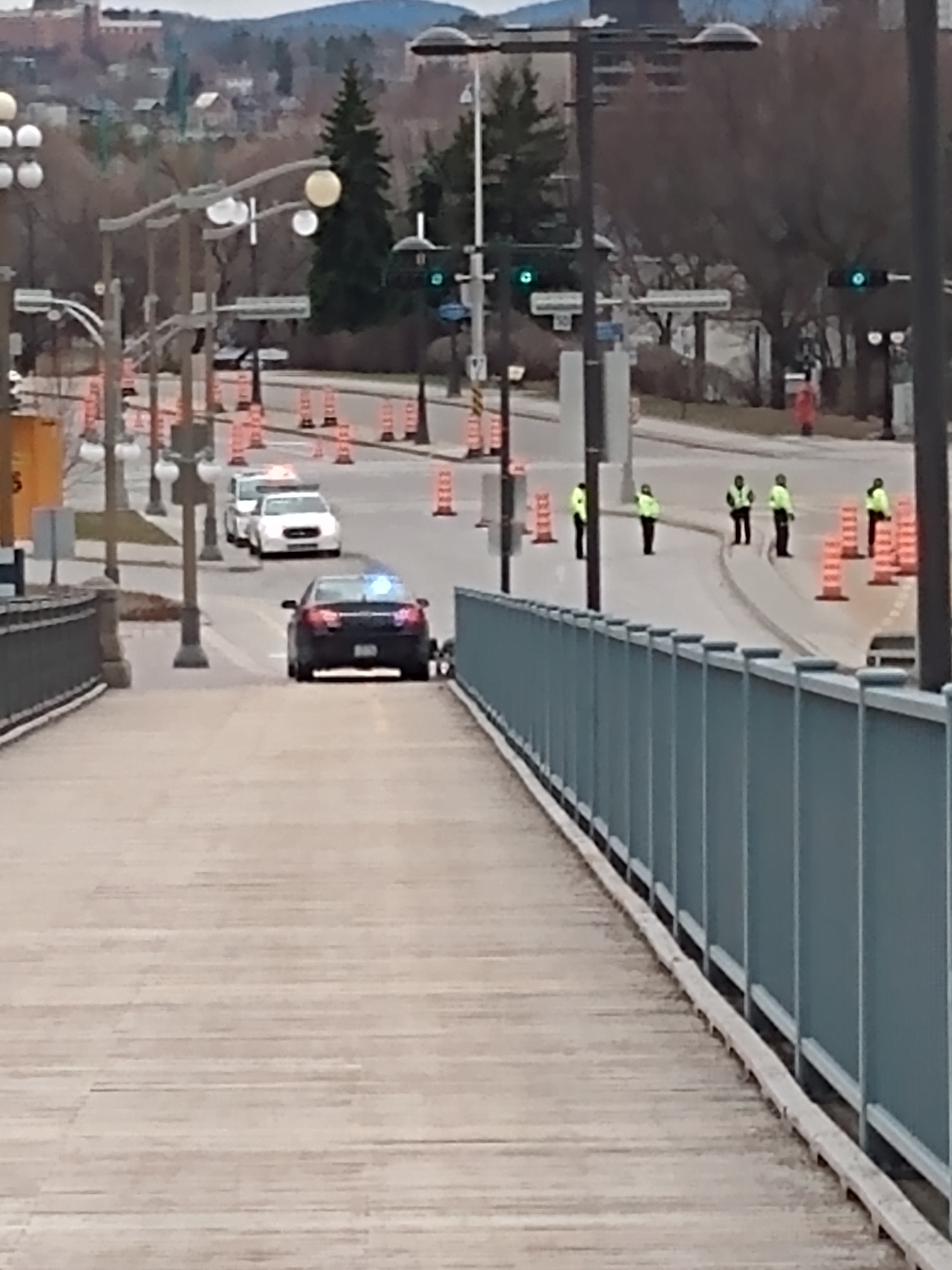
On April 1, border checkpoints such as this one on the Alexandra Bridge were implemented on the Quebec border after the Quebec government imposed travel restrictions.

On April 1, the Quebec government imposed travel restrictions between Ontario and Quebec, setting up checkpoints at the five crossings of the Ottawa River, which separates the city of Ottawa in Ontario and Gatineau in Quebec. Restrictions lasted until May 18.

On April 9, a COVID-19 outbreak is declared at Carlingview Manor, a long-term care home which would be the hardest hit care home in the city. The outbreak ended on June 18.

==== June ====
On June 12, the city entered Stage 2 of the province's re-opening plan, allowing malls, businesses, restaurant patios and hair salons to re-open.

On June 15, OC Transpo became the first public transit authority in Canada to make face masks mandatory.

==== July ====
On July 7, masks are made mandatory in all indoor public spaces in the city.

On July 15, Ottawa City Council approved a face mask by-law in the city for enclosed public spaces. It came with a fine of between $200 and $400.

On July 17, the city entered Stage 3 of the province's re-opening plan, allowing bars and restaurants to open for indoor dining, as well as movie theatres, gyms and fitness centres.

==== August ====
On August 26, City Council extended the mask by-law to include common areas of apartments and condominiums.

==== September ====
On September 18, the city's chief medical officer, Dr. Vera Etches announced the city had entered the second wave of pandemic, blaming the relaxing of measures in August.

On September 19, Monsignor Paul Baxter School in Barrhaven was ordered closed for 14 days due to an outbreak. Three more schools were closed in October.

On September 22, a possible transmission during an outdoor barbecue at a park eventually results in 27 positive cases.

On September 25, an outbreak is declared at the Extendicare Starwood long-term care home, which resulted in 25 residents dying. It was the hardest hit LTC during the second wave of the pandemic.

==== October ====
On October 8, an indoor wedding with no physical distancing or people wearing masks leads to 22 cases of COVID-19.

On October 10, Ottawa moved into a "modified stage 2" resulting in the temporary closure of indoor dining at restaurants and bars and the closure of fitness centres and movie theatres.

On October 14, it was announced that Ottawa had the highest rate of COVID-19 in the province.

On October 15, a 53-year-old woman was charged with breaking the Quarantine Act for failing to self-isolate for 14 days after travelling abroad and returning to work at a long-term care home.

==== November ====
On November 7, the city becomes part of the "orange-restrict" zone following the province's new colour-coded tiered restriction system. This allowed for indoor dining to return with a 50-person limit and last call at 9pm. Gyms, fitness centres and movie theatres were also allowed to re-open.

==== December ====
On December 14, the city received its first vaccine shipment, with 3,000 doses of the Pfizer-BioNTech vaccine arriving at the Ottawa Civic Hospital.

On December 15, the first person in the city was vaccinated, Jo-Anne Miner, a personal support worker.

On December 21, it was announced that the city would go under a 28-day lockdown beginning on Boxing Day. Mayor Watson and Dr. Etches expressed disdain at the decision.

On December 26, the city went under another lockdown, where only essential businesses were allowed to remain open.

On December 27, the first case of the UK coronavirus variant was detected in the city from someone who had recently returned from the UK.

=== 2021 ===
==== January ====
On January 5, a pilot project began to move doses of the Pfizer-BioNTech vaccine from the Ottawa Hospital directly to long-term care homes. Residents at the Perley and Rideau Veterans' Health Centre are the first to receive the vaccine outside of a hospital.

On January 8, it was announced that students would not be returning to school from Christmas vacation on the 11th as had been anticipated, but would do virtual schooling for the next two weeks.

On January 9, the Department of Canadian Heritage announced that Ottawa's annual Winterlude festival would be held virtually this year.

On January 17, an outbreak at the Valley Stream retirement home in Nepean leads to four deaths.

On January 20, it was announced that schools in the city will remain closed. They had been set to re-open on the 25th.

On January 22, the city bans sledding and tobogganing at Mooney's Bay Hill due to consistent large crowds.

On January 27, city council unanimously approved extending the city's temporary mask by-law until April 29.

==== February ====
On February 5, the fist doses of the Moderna COVID-19 vaccine arrived in the city.

On February 8, the provincial government announced that the city's stay at home order would last until February 16. It had been in effect since December 26.

On February 9, the first case of the B.1.351 variant (first identified in South African) of the virus was confirmed.

On February 16, the city reopened into the province's "Orange-Restrict" zone.

On February 17, two employees at the Stirling Park Retirement Community were fired after accusations one of them allowed their wife to be vaccinated while stopping a housekeeper from getting theirs.

==== March ====
On March 2, it was announced that police officers with the Ottawa Police Service would begin getting vaccinations on the 3rd.

On March 12, the city opened its first mass vaccination community clinic at the Nepean Sportsplex, and is available to all residents over 90.

On March 19, the city once again entered into the province's "red zone", which means limiting social gatherings to five people indoors and 25 people outdoors, restaurants only being able to seat ten people inside, tighter capacity at gyms, banning of team sports and closures of movie theatres.

==== April ====
On April 1, it was announced that 34 pharmacies in the city could start offering the AstraZeneca vaccine to adults over 55.

On April 3, the entire province goes under a four-week lockdown amid a rising case numbers as the province enters the third wave of the pandemic.

On April 6, the province released a list of forward sortation areas declared as "hot spots" where adults 50 and over would be able to get vaccinations. In Ottawa, this included K1T and K1V in the city's south end and K2V in Kanata. The inclusion of the latter was scrutinized due to having lower than average COVID-19 cases.

On April 8, the entire province goes on a stay-at-home order.

On April 16, the day before the province's new orders temporarily allowing police to conduct random stops to enforce the stay-at-home order, the Ottawa Police Service announced that they would not be using their new powers. The new orders include restrictions to provincial border crossings (including the installation of checkpoints), prohibiting outdoor social gatherings, closure of all non-essential workplaces, the reduction of capacity limits in retail settings, and the closure of outdoor recreational amenities, including playgrounds.

On April 20, following the province's reversal on not allowing playground use, the city announced that anyone within 5m of playground equipment would be required to wear masks, as of April 21.

On April 28, city councillors Eli El-Chantiry, Jan Harder and Carol Anne Meehan request that parks in their wards (all parks in Barrhaven Ward and Gloucester-South Nepean Ward and Sheila McKee Park in West Carleton-March Ward) be closed at 9pm (rather than 11pm) in accordance with new measures to make it easier for law enforcement to police large public gatherings. They are the only councillors to make such a request.

==== May ====
On May 18, vaccines became available to all Ontarians over 18. All available appointments in Ottawa were booked up in just 2 and half hours.

On May 19, Ottawa Public Health announced that splash pads would be allowed to be open in the city beginning on the weekend. They would be allowed to be open during the stay-at-home order because they were considered to be "like playgrounds". However, unlike playgrounds, people would not have to wear masks while using them. A day later, after some splash pads had opened, it was announced that they would not be, as they were included as part of Ontario's re-opening plan, set to take force June 14. On May 21, the province relented and decided to allow splash pads after all.

On May 23, vaccine appointments were made available to anyone aged 12 and over.

==== June ====
On June 11 at 12:01am, bars and restaurants in the city will be allowed to open their patios (until 2am) as part of Step one of the province's re-opening plans.

On June 16, non-essential travel restrictions between Ontario and Quebec will be removed.

==== July ====
On July 11, it was announced that fans could be in attendance at a sporting event in the city for the first time since the pandemic began. 1,000 fans will be allowed to attend the final three remaining Ottawa Blackjacks games of the season, beginning July 17.

On July 22, the city's state of emergency in effect since March 25, 2020 comes to an end.

==== December ====
On December 18, Ottawa mayor Jim Watson announced that he tested positive for COVID-19.

Following a spike in the number of cases thanks to the omicron variant, new capacity restrictions are re-imposed on businesses on December 20, capping capacity at 50%.

On December 23, the city announced a new 25-person limit on outdoor ice rinks and trails, to come into effect December 26.

=== 2022 ===
==== February ====
On February 17, the province removed capacity limits for restaurants, gyms, movie theatres, meeting spaces, gaming establishments and other indoor areas that opt-in to proof of vaccination requirements. Private gathering sizes also increased to 50 people indoors and 100 people outdoors.

==== March ====
On March 1, the province removed the proof of vaccination system requirement for non-essential businesses.

== Notable closures relating to the pandemic ==
• All places of worship
• Public schools
• National museums

== See also ==
- COVID-19 pandemic in Canada
- COVID-19 pandemic in Ontario
- COVID-19 pandemic in Toronto
- COVID-19 pandemic in the Regional Municipality of Peel
- COVID-19 pandemic in the Regional Municipality of York
