= Camilla Care Community =

Care home in Mississauga, Ontario, Canada

Coordinates: 43°34′23″N 79°36′24″W

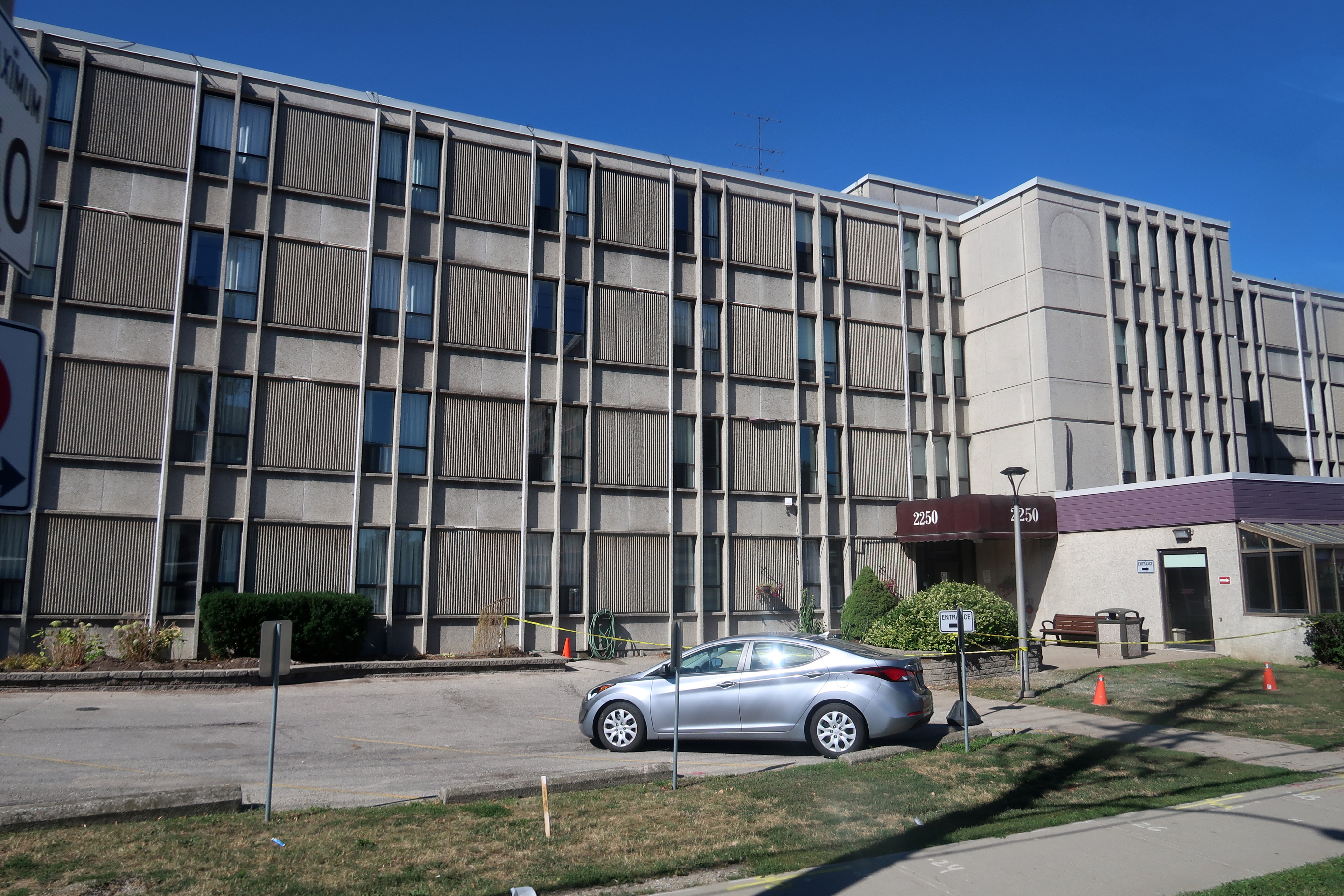
- Interactive map of the Camilla Care Community area
- Former names: Chelsey Park Nursing Home

General information
- Location: 2250 Hurontario Street, Mississauga, Ontario, Canada
- Opened: 1970
- Closed: December 15, 2023
- Demolished: 2024
- Owner: Partners Community Health

Other information
- Seating type: beds
- Seating capacity: 236

Website
- camillacare.ca (on Wayback Machine)

Camilla Care Community was a 236-resident long-term care home in Mississauga, Ontario, owned by Partners Community Health. It was located next to Trillium Health Partners' Mississauga Hospital. The facility was taken over, temporarily, by the province of Ontario in May 2020, as a result of extensive deaths from COVID-19. The facility closed on December 15, 2023, to make way for the new Mississauga Hospital. Partners Community Health opened Wellbrook Place as a replacement.

== History ==
The facility began accepting patients in March 1970, as Chelsey Park Nursing Home Ltd. Operated by the British Columbia-based National Hospital Management Services, it advertised as a "completely modern nursing home designed for the care of invalids, elderly, and convalescent patients."

As of 1972, the facility had a teen-aged volunteer group, the Chelsea Park Volunteer Association.

In 2001, Toronto Star reported on the lack of air conditioning in some long-term care facilities, featuring Chelsey Park. Only common rooms were air-conditioned at that point, and one resident had been sent to the nearby hospital for dehydration twice. An administrator noted that they had six extra staff devoted to "giving out extra fluids," and that residents "do everything to fight air conditioning."

The facility seems to have kept its Chelsey Park name until at least 2007, however there was a second facility in Streetsville, with the same name.

The Ontario Ministry of Health and Long-Term Care announced a program in October 2014, called the "Enhanced Long Term Care Home Renewal Strategy". Within the Mississauga Halton LHIN, that sought to redevelop 32% of area long-term care bed capacity. One of the sites identified was Camilla Care Community. As of 2016, plans were still being considered.

An 82-year-old resident was charged with manslaughter in 2017, after the death of a 79-year-old resident.

In November 2021 it was announced that Partners Community Health (a not-for-profit organization) and Trillium Health Partners entered into an agreement with Sienna Senior Living to purchase and operate Camilla Care Community. As of April 1, 2022, Trillium Health Partners purchased the building and land that the home is situated on, while Partners Community Health acquired the 236 long-term care bed licenses and operations of the home.

=== COVID-19 outbreak, deaths ===
During the 2020 COVID-19 outbreak in Ontario, there was an extensive outbreak at the facility. As of 29 May 2020, there had been 64 confirmed deaths, making it the second-most deadly outbreak in Ontario. On May 27, the province of Ontario announced that it would take over management of the facility for two weeks. The four other facilities listed included the Sienna-owned Altamont Care Community, which had the third-most number of deaths.

At some point, staff from the Mississauga Hospital had been transferred to the facility to help.

The Washington Post used the facility as a case study for nursing home deaths in Canada. In the story, the family of one woman who died in April told the Post reporter that the facility had downplayed the severity of the outbreak. Similarly, the facility's deaths were not mentioned in a voice message to families of residents, sent May 8. The story also cited a staff member who shared that the facility had limited the availability of PPE, forcing staff to use one mask for their entire shift. That employee later tested positive.

The first outbreak was active from March 30 to June 7, 2020.

On June 16, 2020, a new outbreak was declared at the facility.

Peel Public Health declared an outbreak of gastroenteritis at the facility on August 12, 2020.
