= COVID-19 pandemic in the Regional Municipality of Peel =

COVID-19 viral pandemic in Peel Region, Ontario

- Disease: COVID-19
- Pathogen: SARS-CoV-2
- Location: Regional Municipality of Peel
- Confirmed cases: 107,559
- Active cases: 2,991
- Recovered: 103,815
- Deaths: 753
- Fatality rate: 0.7%

Government website
- www.peelregion.ca/coronavirus/

The COVID-19 pandemic was a viral pandemic of coronavirus disease 2019 (COVID-19), a novel infectious disease caused by severe acute respiratory syndrome coronavirus 2 (SARS-CoV-2). The pandemic has affected the Cities of Mississauga and Brampton, and the Town of Caledon, within the Regional Municipality of Peel. As part of the larger closure decisions in Ontario, a stay-at-home order shuttered all nonessential businesses, and caused event cancellations.

As early as May 2020, Peel was considered one of the province's main "hot spots", in particular Brampton. That month, a Mississauga nursing home was taken over by the Province after a scathing report from the military.

As of December 2020, a third of Peel's workplace outbreaks have been in manufacturing or industrial settings.

== Background ==
William Osler Health System asked Brampton City Council for municipal funding, at a December 13, 2019 meeting. An emergency declaration was considered, but withdrawn. Brampton's Peel Memorial Urgent Care Centre was designed for 10,000 patients a year, and operated at 75,000 patients a year receiving funding for 15,000. Brampton had the lowest per capita hospital beds in Ontario, with 0.9 per 1000 residents, compared to the provincial average of 2.3. It also had the lowest per capita funding in Ontario, and Canada's second lowest rate.

In January 2020, CBC News reports that overcrowding — Code Gridlock — is routine in Ontario hospitals. Following the release of this report, and a presentation by a group of doctors, Brampton City Council voted unanimously in favour of declaring a "health care emergency" in the city, citing chronic overcrowding of Brampton Civic Hospital, its only full hospital facility.

== Timeline ==
=== 2020 ===
==== January ====
- January 22: Novel coronavirus becomes a mandatory reportable disease for Ontario health units.
- January 23: Region of Peel Chief Medical Officer of Health Dr. Jessica Hopkins tells council that risk of the novel coronavirus is low in Peel.
- January 27: Peel District School Board advises that it's working with authorities, but no changes will be made at school level. It instructs parents to not send students to school with masks.
- January 29: Brampton CAO David Barrick reports to council about the City's response to the novel coronavirus.
- January 30: Canadian Prime Minister Justin Trudeau is in Brampton for a press conference. During questions, he comments on the virus, including concerns about Canadians in China. Canadian Press interviews a Mississauga father, whose daughter was in Wuhan.

==== February ====
- February 29: Peel Public Health learns that someone with COVID-19 had attended work in the Region for three days, before self-isolating. The workplace was not in Brampton, and the worker lived outside of Peel.

==== March ====
- March 5: Peel confirms its first case of COVID-19, a Mississauga man who had travelled on the Grand Princess cruise ship from February 11 to 21. His wife was confirmed as the second carrier.
- March 8: A man returning from Germany tests positive for COVID-19 at Brampton Civic Hospital.
- March 9: Dr. Jessica Hopkins, the region's Medical Officer of Health, announces her departure. Dr. Lawrence Loh assumes the role of interim Medical Officer of Health.
- March 10: An entire floor of Royal Bank of Canada's Meadowvale office tower is told to self-quarantine, after a worker tests positive.
- March 21: Brampton Mayor Patrick Brown comments in an interview that he expects that COVID-19 will "not be a matter of weeks, it's going to be a matter of months," contrary to most government suggestions at the time.
- March 23: Mississauga declares a state of emergency.
- March 24: Brampton declares a state of emergency.
- March 25: Liberal MP for Brampton West Kamal Khera tests positive for COVID-19.
- Peel Addiction Assessment and Referral Centre, which has 700 clients, restructured its interactions due to physical distancing requirements.

==== April ====
- April 9: Brampton Civic Hospital announced the death of an environmental services associate. He was the first hospital employee in Ontario to die of the disease.
- April 18: Mississauga reports 137 new cases of COVID-19, which would remain its daily peak as of July 15.
- April 27: Personal support worker Arlene Reid, who worked at multiple venues in Peel, dies of COVID-19. She is the first long-term care worker death in Peel. Her daughter alleges that two shifts at Holland Christian Home were worked without PPE being offered, which the LTC denies.

==== May ====
- May 25: After Premier Doug Ford mentions that the province has "hot spots" for COVID, "lighting up like a Christmas tree," the Ministry of Health revealing that Peel Region is among the hotspots. Ford later narrowed that to Brampton.
- May: Mississauga Food Bank looked to raise $840,000 in response to the pandemic. Basketball player RJ Barrett donated $100,000.

==== June ====
- June 6, 7, 17: Black Lives Matter-related protests held at Brampton's Chinguacousy Park, Mississauga's Celebration Square, and the Peel District School Board headquarters. At a June 24 press conference, Dr. Lawrence Loh commented that there was no evidence that these events impacted case numbers.
- June 24: Peel Region was given the go-ahead to enter Stage 2 of reopening.

==== July ====
- July 2: Dr. Lawrence Loh accepts the position of Medical Officer of Health on a permanent basis.
- July 15: Peel Health reports no new cases of COVID-19 in Mississauga, for the first time since March 22.
- July 25: Over 200 people attend a house party in Brampton. The event is broken up by bylaw officers; the organizer was issued a $880 fine. Premier Ford calls the hosts and guests "a bunch of yahoos", suggesting that they should receive the $100,000 fine, through the Emergency Management and Civil Protection Act.
- July 31: Peel Region was allowed by the provincial government to enter Stage 3 of reopening.

==== October ====
- October 10: Due to an increase in cases, Peel region was knocked back to a modified Stage 2, along with Toronto, Ottawa - and as of October 19, 2020, York Region. The measures included the closure of indoor dining in bars and restaurants, and the closure of gyms, movie theatres and casinos. The measures are in effect for 28 days.

==== November ====
- November 6: Due to move out of the modified Stage 2, Premier Ford announced that Peel Region would instead move into a Red-level in the provinces new colour-coded restriction system.
- November 7: The region of Peel legislated restrictions that are more stringent than the provincial red-level restrictions.
- November 14: Peel Region Police and Brampton bylaw officers bust a large gathering at Gurdwara Nanaskar Temple in Brampton after hundreds of people attended. Brampton Mayor Patrick Brown confirmed that major fines were issued.
- November 18: Some 58 staff at Tyndall Senior's Village in Mississauga have active cases of COVID, as well as 30 residents. In a two-week period, 171 total cases had been identified.
- November 20: Ontario Premier Doug Ford announced Peel Region along with nearby Toronto would be placed on the lockdown category according to the new response framework, effective November 23. Under these orders, bars and restaurants would be restricted to take-out, drive-thru and delivery services only, no private gatherings outside of one's household, cinemas, casinos, gyms and fitness centres must close. Non-essential retail stores will be shuttered, with curb-side pickup and delivery services allowed, and sports and recreation activities must suspend operations. The film and television industry can remain open under Control (red) level restrictions. Schools and childcare would remain open while post-secondary education would move into virtual learning (with exceptions for those that require in-person training).

==== December ====
- December 9:
  - Health Canada approved the Pfizer–BioNTech COVID-19 vaccine for use in Canada.
  - Trillium Health Partners announces that 36 staff at its three sites, two of which are in Mississauga, are self-isolating after contracting COVID-19.
- December 10: The Globe and Mail reports that, while Toronto and Ottawa will receive vaccines from Ontario early enough to begin immunization on December 15, Peel would have to wait. At the time, Ottawa was not under lockdown; the province claims its priority spot was in order to test how it would ship the product. Mayor Brown tells CityNews that he expects this to be corrected immediately, lest it show favoritism to other regions over data. An epidemiologist in the same story asked rhetorically why Peel hasn't received additional resources and surveillance testing.
- December 16: Mississauga News reports that Trillium Health Partners has transferred 30 patients since November 30, amid a COVID-19 surge.
- December 17:
  - Brampton releases a short film, The Spread, hoping to "drive an emotional response from viewers."
  - A source tells the National Post that Amazon warehouses in Ontario have seen more than 400 COVID-19 cases. Peel has four warehouses for the company, and while the Region does not disclose the location of outbreaks, give of the top six workplace outbreaks were at "distribution centres."
- December 21: Trillium Health opens a COVID vaccine clinic. Bella Rego, a registered nurse at Camilla Care Community, is the first recipient. Rego had spent a month in self-isolation at home, after testing positive for the virus in April.
- December 22:
  - A vaccine clinic opens at Brampton Civic Hospital. Vilma Whyte, a personal support worker from Tullamore Care Community, is the first to receive the vaccine. The hospital aimed for 300 vaccinations a day in coming weeks.
  - Trillium Health issues a press release looking to hire doctors, for "temporary pandemic needs across our sites."
- December 30: The Toronto Star publishes an opinion piece, noting among other things that warehouse workers are generally temporary agency employees, without basic benefits or workplace protections like paid sick leave. Amazon employs based on speed, not factoring in the impact of physical distancing requirements.
- December 31: Personal support workers stop attending the home of a senior in Mississauga, after he and his wife became ill with COVID-19. Having late-stage dementia and with after-effects of a stroke, the man requires two PSWs to visit a washroom, and so for days was left soiled in his home.
- In an effort to discourage gatherings on the holiday, it was announced that Brampton Transit, Miway (Mississauga Transit), (like other surrounding transit agencies in the Greater Toronto Area, such as Metrolinx (which operates GO Transit), York Region Transit, Oakville Transit, and the Toronto Transit Commission (TTC)) that they will not offer extended or fare free evening or overnight transit on New Year's Eve as they have done in past years.

=== 2021 ===
==== January ====
- January 5: Maureen Ambersley, a registered practical nurse at Extendicare Mississauga, dies of COVID-19. She is the second long-term care employee to die in Peel, the fourth member of the Service Employees International Union.

==== March ====
- March 12: A Brampton Amazon warehouse is shut down due to a major COVID-19 outbreak. The outbreak at the warehouse has been linked to over 600 infections since October, nearly half of them in the last month.

==== April ====
- April 22:
  - Emily Viegas dies of COVID, at age 13, one of the youngest deaths in Canada. Viegas' father was hesitant to admit her to hospital, as he worried that she would be moved from Brampton Civic Hospital to another facility; her mother was already hospitalized.
  - The Local publishes an article titled "You Can't Stop the Spread of the Virus if You Don't Stop it in Peel", which had been turned down by four other media outlets. A summary of the issues locally, it is later credited as a turning-point in provincial response, by Rogers Media.
- April 30: Mississauga resident and radio show host Ted Woloshyn is alive, despite rumours, reports The Toronto Sun. He was hospitalized with the disease, shortly before his scheduled first vaccine.

==== November ====
- November 3: By this point, 89% of Peel residents had received at least one vaccine dose, and 84% of the population had received the complete double dosage.
- November 4: Dr. Lawrence Loh describes it as "unfortunate" that hospital employees were not being given a vaccine mandate by the province.

==== December ====
Bonnie Crombie tested positive for COVID-19, announcing such on her Twitter account, on December 24. She was double vaccinated, and had mild symptoms.

The City of Brampton continued with its New Year's Eve event and New Year's Leeve, downtown. Mayor Brampton relayed that public health authorities hadn't told them to cancel the event, despite record numbers of new cases. Councillors Jeff Bowman, Pat Fortini, and Martin Medeiros encouraged residents to stay home. In contrast, Mississauga cancelled its event, including fireworks. It did allow residents to use the Celebration Square skating rink, and for food trucks to operate. As of December 22, Mayor Crombie had suggested that she was hopeful that the event would continue.

During the holiday period, Mississauga Fire & Emergency Services peaked at 40 pandemic-related staff absences. With the firefighter union — IAFF 1212 — they implemented rapid antigen tests in response. Numbers are said to have stabilized and improved.

=== 2022 ===
==== January ====
With a rise in Omicron variant cases, the Premier announced a variety of measures to limit the opportunity for spread. The "modified Step 2" banned things like indoor dining and gyms, and re-introduced capacity limits, to run from January 5 to at least January 26. Brampton Mayor Brown contested the closure to recreation centres. He announced outside activities like the plowing of soccer fields for "winter soccer".

Osler hospitals became overwhelmed with COVID cases, triggering their first "Code Orange" of the pandemic, on January 3; it lasted until January 5. As of January 5, Osler had reported that were treating 105 COVID patients between hospitals in Brampton and Etobicoke; The hospital reported no COVID patients under the age of 5. That day, it also paused all non-emergency surgeries and procedures at Brampton Civic Hospital. Surgeries had resumed in October. Trillium Health Partners hospitals had 343 staff on leave with COVID-19, as of January 4. There were 200 confirmed cases in patients across its sites, as of January 6, with 15 in critical care. Headwaters Health Care Centre suspended most surgeries and procedures on January 7.

Peel Paramedics were also challenged by the demands: in the afternoon of January 2, a "Code Black" was called, indicating "one or less" ambulances were available to response to a call. As of September 2020, Peel Paramedics suggested the service would need 111 additional ambulances to meet demand by 2036.

The rise in Omicron variant cases led to a variety of service changes. All sectors were expected to experience a 20 to 30 per cent absence rate. Region of Peel cancelled an annual garbage limit exemption, and suspended roadside pickup of bulky items. City of Mississauga has noted that it can maintain essential services, even if 40 per cent of staff were sick. MiWay cancelled two express routes, due to staff shortages. Of the 1200 unionized workers with Brampton Transit, 250 were on leave as of January 6, resulting in reduced service levels.

Students return to schools was delayed from January 3 to January 5 by the province, with a possible return on January 17. On January 10, Ontario's Big City Mayors passed a motion to get students back in physical classes by January 17. Patrick Brown seconded the motion, introduced by the Kingston Mayor, Bryan Patterson. Teachers' groups and trustees expressed concern, including around the lack of reporting about cases.

Midway through the month, local vaccination reached 3 million total doses. Despite the high vaccination rate, Dr. Loh warned that Omicron's transmissibility would lead to wide case numbers. The Region increased usage of wastewater tracking.

In-person learning resumed at Ontario schools, January 17. The Peel District School Board received 138 new HEPA filters from the Ontario Ministry of Education, for their 259 schools.

==== February ====
Various businesses, like restaurants and gyms, were able to reopen under Ontario guidelines on February 1. Mayor Crombie stressed reopening must be done "cautiously and gradually," to make sure the reopening didn't need to be reversed. Mayor Brown called on the province to loosen restrictions quicker.

Early in the month, Dr. Loh shared that the largest portion of those hospitalized were the unvaccinated, followed by those 50 and older without a booster shot. As of February 2, Mississauga's two hospitals had 176 COVID-19 patients, while Brampton Civic had 107. Occurrence of Omicron in wastewater had declined.

On February 5, "Freedom Convoy" protestors met at various points outside of Toronto, including Square One and a Tim Hortons on the Oakville/Mississauga border, en route to the Ontario Legislative Building.

Mayor Brown pushed for mask mandates to end in schools, at his February 23 press conference. Both Mayor Crombie and Peel MOH Dr. Loh disagreed with the timing. Epidemiologist Colin Furness told The Brampton Guardian that the hospitalization of children had reached its highest rate.

==== March ====
At an event in Brampton, former Mississauga mayor Hazel McCallion urged people to be patient will politicians during the pandemic, noting that they had never experienced a pandemic previously.

Peel Memorial's urgent care centre reopened on March 21, having closed in mid-January. Trillium Hospital is to wind down their vaccination at Credit Valley Hospital, March 25. As of March 18, a total of 3,287,960 doses had been administered in Peel.

Masking requirements were lifted in Ontario March 21, however local by-laws remained in place until March __. The Elementary Teachers' Federation of Ontario expressed concern with the revocation.

==== May ====
It was announced late in the month that Lawrence Loh had accepted a role as executive director and chief executive officer of The College of Family Physicians of Canada. The position will begin in September.

==== June ====
School boards were no longer required to report staff or student absences to the province, as of June 15. Schools will still report to Peel Public Health when absence rates exceed 30 per cent. That rate was not reached between May 25 and June 22.

"Frontline Workers of Caledon" received a spot on the Town of Caledon Walk of Fame.

The first case of Monkeypox was confirmed in Peel, late in the month, in a Mississauga male.

Re-elected as Dufferin—Caledon MPP, Sylvia Jones was named Deputy Premier and Minister of Health.

== Vaccination ==
Vaccination data in Peel	#	Ref
Doses administered in Peel	864,927	
Number of people with at least one dose	834,839	
Number of people fully vaccinated (received both doses of a vaccine)	30,088	
Percentage of total Peel population who has received at least one dose	47.1%	
Percentage of adult (18+) Peel population who has received at least one dose	59%	
Percentage of Ontario doses administered in Peel	11.87%	

Data as of May 18, 2021

Vaccination clinics are held at select doctors offices and pharmacies, BAPS Shri Swaminarayan Complex, Brampton Civic Hospital, Brampton Islamic Centre, Chinguacousy Wellness Centre, Caledon East Community Centre, Chris Gibson Recreation Centre, International Centre, MAC Islamic Community Centre of Ontario, Paramount Fine Foods Centre Sportsplex, Region of Peel (10 Peel Centre Drive, Brampton), Region of Peel (7120 Hurontario Street), Save Max Sports Centre, Trillium Health Partners, Mississauga Hospital, and the Recreation, Athletics and Wellness Centre at the University of Toronto Mississauga.

As of April 30, 2021, there were 61 pharmacies offering vaccinations in Brampton, 7 in Caledon, and 80 in Mississauga.

Of the 1021 deaths from COVID-19 in Peel, as of early November 2021, only one was from a person who was fully vaccinated. Their age and how long they had been fully vaccinated was withheld.

== Cases ==
=== Long-term care homes ===
As of 31 May 2020, the following LTC homes in Peel have 10 or more confirmed COVID-19 related deaths:

- Camilla Care Community LTC (Mississauga) - 64
- Cooksville Care Centre (Mississauga) - 18
- Erin Mills Lodge Nursing Home LTC (Mississauga) - 17
- Village of Erin Meadows LTC (Mississauga) - 19
- Grace Manor (Brampton) - 12
- Villa Forum (Mississauga) - 10

The outbreak at Camilla Care Community in Mississauga was among Ontario's deadliest, receiving attention from The Washington Post. On May 27, the Province of Ontario announced that it would take over management of the facility for two weeks.

Outbreaks were common at long-term care facilities in 2020.

Notable outbreaks included:

- Camilla Care Community; As of May 7, 48 residents had died of COVID-19.
- Peel Manor; At least one resident has died at the facility, in mid-April 2020.
- Trillium Health Partners, Credit Valley Hospital
  - An outbreak was declared March 27, and reported by April 1, after four patients in the rehab unit tested positive. The outbreak ended on May 8.

In early December 2020, Brampton's Hawthorn Woods Care Community confirmed 84 active cases among residents and staff.

=== Business outbreaks resulting in Section 22 closures ===
In Caledon, Amazon Fulfillment Centre YYZ-7 (partial, April 24), A&G The Road Cleaners (partial, May 4), Aluma Systems (full, April 30), and Material Handling Systems (full, May 11).

In Brampton, AlphaPoly Packaging (partial, May 4), Amazon Fulfillment Centre YYZ-3 (partial, April 30, partial, May 21), Amazon Fulfillment Centre YYZ-4 (partial, April 24), Canadian Textile Services Fabric Dryers & Finishers (partial, May 4), Can Art Aluminum Extrusion Inc. (partial, April 27), Canadian Tire Distribution Centre (8550 Goreward Road, partial, April 27; 8550 Goreward Road, partial, May 14), Cargill Beef (partial, May 5), KFC (9940 Airport Road, full, May 1), Kintetsu World Express (partial, April 27), Massiv Automated Systems (partial, April 30), Menasha Packaging (partial, May 8), Olymel (partial, May 28), Popeyes (full, May 26), Pro-Poly Custom Plywood (full, May 8), SHW Pumps & Engine Components Inc. (partial, April 29), Tim Hortons (full, 11075 Creditview Road, May 16), TNT Foods International (partial, May 10), TJX Canada Distribution Centre (partial, April 30), Walmart Supercenter (50 Quarry Edge Drive, partial, May 14), WG Pro Manufacturing (partial, April 28), and Woodlore International (partial, May 14).

In Mississauga, Amazon Fulfillment Centre YYZ-1 (partial, 6363 Millcreek Drive, May 21), Applewood Chevrolet Cadillac Buick GMC (partial, April 27), Axium Packaging (full, May 8), Borges Food Ltd. (full, May 6), B & R Machine Co Ltd. (full, May 8), Canada Post (partial, April 28), CCT Canada (full, May 15), ergoCentric Seating Systems (partial, May 11), FedEx Ship Centre (6895 Bramalea Road, partial, May 1), Furlani Bakery (partial, May 11), Giraffe Foods Inc. (partial, May 1), Hampton Inn & Suites (partial, May 8), Master Manufacturing (full, May 11), Matrix Logistics Services (partial, May 5), Media 6 IMG (full, May 6), Ms. Embroidery & Screenprinting (full, May 7), MTD Metro Tool & Die Limited (partial, May 1), Paradigm Electronics Inc. (partial, April 27), Premier Candle Corporation (partial, April 28), Quest Steel Inc. (full, May 8), Radial Inc. (partial, May 8), Stackpole (partial, May 4), TD Canada Trust (full, May 8), Tim Hortons (full, 3445 Hurontario Street, May 16), and TJX Canada Distribution Centre (partial, April 30).

=== Other outbreaks ===
In late April, the dormitory-format Ontario Correctional Institute in Brampton was closed after 60 inmates and eight workers tested positive. Inmates were moved to the Toronto South Detention Centre, to allow for a deep clean, and for staff to self-isolate for two weeks.

== Government response ==
Region of Peel continued to hold weekly council meetings.

On March 16, 2020, Peel municipalities began exempting retail deliveries from noise bylaws, allowing around-the-clock goods movement. The measure was to last 30 days.

Mississauga declared a state of emergency on March 23, 2020, with Brampton doing the same the next day. Under the Ontario Emergency Management and Civil Protection Act, this allowed both various additional abilities including restricting movement, establishment of emergency shelters or health care facilities, and the power to close private businesses.

=== Transit ===
Someone with COVID-19 travelled on MiWay transit between March 2 and 4, the first known incident. This was followed by someone with the virus on a GO Transit leaving Toronto Pearson International Airport. Following this incident, Peel Public Health advised that public transit was still a safe option, and Brampton and Mississauga both announced "enhanced cleaning practices."

MiWay Mississauga and Brampton Transit were made free starting March 21, with most express services cancelled. Boarding was to take place by the rear doors.

Three Brampton Transit drivers on the 511 Steeles route tested positive for COVID-19, at the same time as an unnamed logistics business on the route experienced an outbreak. (This business was later revealed to be an Amazon fulfillment centre.) As a result, the 511, 11, and 51 routes were diverted from continuing their full lengths, resuming a week later. Dael Muttly Jaecques, a driver on the 502 Main line, died of COVID later that month. The 502 intersects with the 511.

Ontario transit services were experiencing an almost 90 percent loss in ridership, as of March 2021. At various points, there were aid packages from other levels of government.

=== Fire departments ===
As of December 28, 18 Mississauga Fire Department staff had tested positive for COVID-19, with another 60 in self-isolation. The Mississauga Fire Fighters Association correlated this in part to an autumn policy change around sick days; the City commissioner contests that there was "no change in policy."

== Impacts ==
=== Business closures and event cancellations ===
In mid-February, the Mississauga Chinese Business Association reports that Chinese restaurants in the city have been 25-50% drops in revenue, attributable to misinformation.

At least one business closed and sent employees home after an employee falsely claim of that a family member had tested positive for COVID-19. He was charged with public mischief.

An employee at Maple Leaf Foods poultry plant in Brampton tested positive; employees who had contact with them were sent home for self-isolation. The company waited 20 days before publicly acknowledging the diagnosis. The number sick grew to 24 by May 6, according to a Peel Public Health statement. Operations at the facility were suspended in early April.

On May 7, United Food and Commercial Workers Union Local 175 confirmed the death of a Maple Lodge Farms plant's staff members.

After a staff member was diagnosed with COVID-19, Mississauga meat producer Sofina Foods ended its overnight shift to allow for cleaning processes.

The ECHL, the league of which the Brampton Beast are part, cancelled the remainder of its season on March 14, 2020.

Three workers at Caledon's Amazon plant have tested positive for COVID-19, as of May 20, 2020.

A Mississauga business named Huf Gym stayed opened during lockdown closures. This led to a standoff between authorities and the business its supporters. At one protest, Peel Regional Police Sergeant Paul Brown hugged protesters, and allowed one protester to intimidate a Global News reporter. His suspension was lifted roughly a week after it was initiated, with the officer remaining on administrative duty.

=== Religion ===
After gatherings of more than 5 people were banned, services at all places of worship were cancelled. Various congregations took to live streaming their services, from either the place of worship itself (as is the case with Mississauga's St. Maximilian Kolbe Catholic Church) or remotely. Brampton's Har Tikvah synagogue added other online programming, beyond its normal services. Ontario Khalsa Darbar closed its langar to pickup-only.

As of April 29, the City of Brampton was allowing staff discretion around enforcement of noise by-laws, in relation to mosques broadcasting adhan (a call to prayer) during the month of Ramadan; it was waiting for a staff report on the topic. At the May 6 meeting, council approved a one-time by-law exemption. Mayor Patrick Brown noted that church bells were exempted in the existing by-law.

Mississauga council passed a motion at its April 29 council meeting, allowing mosques to do one adhan each day, which is normally banned by city noise by-law. The item was a "walk on item" based on a request by the Muslim Council of Peel, meaning that it wasn't on the public agenda, nor was a staff report on the topic available. Since then, two councillors have commented that Mayor Bonnie Crombie provided council with incorrect information on the subject, and that the matter should be revisited. Discussion on the topic has been referred to the city's Diversity and Inclusion Advisory Committee.

The move and the criticism that followed received international headlines. Ram Subrahmanian, a member of the group Keep Religion Out Of Peel Region Schools, has received donations for an intended court challenge. A spokesperson for Muslim Canadian Congress commented that "many Islamic scholars who have denounced the use of loudspeakers in mosques as against the spirit of Islam."

The decision allowed similar exemptions in communities including Windsor; Toronto announced that it would do the same, if asked.
