= List of government bonds =

This is a list of categories of government bonds around the world.

== Main issuers ==
Currency	Country	Generic Name or Nickname	Public sector debt 2022 (US dollar bn nominal equivalent)	Government financial liabilities as % of GDP (end 2022 - source : OECD)	Issuer	Internet site
Yen	Japan	JGBs	10,084	254.5%	Ministry of Finance (MoF)	Site
US dollar	United States	US Treasuries	34,472	144.2%	Bureau of the Fiscal Service	Site
Euro	Italy	BTPs	2,941	148.5%	Dipartimento del Tesoro	Site
Euro	France	OATs	3,484	117.3%	Agence France Trésor	Site
Euro	Germany	Bunds	2,732	65.4%	German Finance Agency	Site
Pound sterling	United Kingdom	Gilts	4,803	104.5%	UK Debt Management Office	Site
Indian Rupee	India	G-sec	Not Found	Not Found	Reserve Bank of India	Site

== Country by country data ==
Country	Issuing Authority	Instruments (type / maturity)	Reference
South Korea	Ministry of Strategy and Finance	Korea Treasury Bond (KTB) – medium/long-term bonds; Korea International Bond (KIB) – international bonds; National Housing Bond (NHB) – long-term housing bonds	Ministry of Strategy and Finance
Japan	Ministry of Finance (Zaimu-shō)	Japanese Government Bonds (JGBs) – general government debt; Revenue Bonds / Straight Bonds – bonds; Financing Bills – short-term bills; Subsidy Bonds – bonds; Subscription Bonds – bonds; Contribution Bonds – bonds; Demand Bonds (kofu kokusai) – bonds; Index-linked Bonds (JGBi) – inflation-linked bonds	Ministry of Finance
Hong Kong	Hong Kong Monetary Authority	Government Bond Programme – medium/long-term bonds	Hong Kong Monetary Authority
China	Ministry of Finance	Treasury Bonds – medium/long-term bonds; Treasury Bills – short-term bills (various maturities); Savings Bonds – retail savings instruments	Ministry of Finance
India	Reserve Bank of India	Government Securities (G-Secs) – medium/long-term bonds; State Development Loans (SDLs) – state-level bonds	Government Bonds by RBI
Austria	Österreichische Bundesfinanzierungsagentur (Federal Financing Agency)	Government Bonds – long-term; Debt Issuance Programme (DIP/DIP 144A) – medium/long-term; Euro Medium Term Note (EMTN) – medium/long-term; ATB-Programms – Treasury bills	ÖBFA
Belgium	Belgian Debt Agency (Agentschap van de Schuld / Agence de la Dette)	Belgian Treasury Bills (BTB) – bills (≤1 year); Certificats de Trésorerie (CTs) – bills (≤1 year); Obligations Linéaires Ordinaires (OLOs) – bonds (medium/long-term)	Belgian Debt Agency
Finland	Valtiokonttori	Government Bonds – long-term; Yield Bonds – long-term fixed rate; EMTN Programme – medium/long-term; Government Treasury Bills – bills (≤1 year)	Valtiokonttori
France	Agence France Trésor	BTFs – bills (≤1 year); BTANs – notes (1–6 years); OATs – bonds (7–50 years); TEC10 OATs – floating rate bonds (10-year indexed); OATi – inflation-linked bonds (French CPI); OAT€i – inflation-linked bonds (Eurozone CPI)	Agence France Trésor
Germany	German Finance Agency	Bubills – Treasury discount paper (6 & 12 months, zero-coupon); Schätze – Federal Treasury notes (2 years); Bobls – Federal notes (5 years); Bobl/ei – inflation-linked notes (5 years); Bunds – Federal bonds (10 & 30 years); Bund/ei – inflation-linked bonds (10, 15, 30 years)	Finance Agency
Greece	PDMA	Treasury Bills – short-term bills (≤1 year); Greek Government Bonds (GGBs) – medium/long-term bonds	PDMA
Italy	Dipartimento del Tesoro	BOTs – Treasury bills (≤1 year); CTZs – Zero-coupon bills (≤2 years); BTPs – Bonds (medium/long-term); CCTs – Floating rate notes (medium/long-term); BTP Italia – inflation-linked bonds (Italian CPI); BTP€i – inflation-linked bonds (Eurozone CPI)	BTP Italia
Netherlands	Dutch State Treasury Agency	Dutch Treasury Certificates (DTCs) – bills (≤1 year); Dutch State Loans (DSLs) – bonds (medium/long-term)	DSTA
Spain	Tesoro Público	Letras del Tesoro – bills (≤18 months); Bonos del Estado – bonds (2–5 years); Obligaciones del Estado – bonds (10, 15, 30 years)	Tesoro Público
Denmark	Danmarks Nationalbank	Nominelle obligationer – nominal bonds (medium/long-term); Inflationsindekserede obligationer – inflation-linked bonds; Skatkammerbeviser – Treasury bills (≤1 year)	Danmarks Nationalbank
United Kingdom	Debt Management Office	Gilts – government bonds; Conventional Gilts – fixed coupon bonds (various maturities); Index-linked Gilts – inflation-linked bonds; Undated Gilts – perpetual (redeemed in 2015); Gilt strips – zero-coupon strips	UK Debt Management Office
United States	Bureau of the Fiscal Service	Treasury bills – short-term (≤1 year); Treasury notes – medium-term (2–10 years); Treasury bonds – long-term (20–30 years); TIPS – inflation-protected bonds; U.S. Savings Bonds – retail savings bonds	Bureau of the Fiscal Service
Canada	Government of Canada	Canada Bond – fixed rate bonds (medium/long-term); Real return bond (RRB) – inflation-indexed bonds; Canada Savings Bond (CSB) – retail savings bonds; Ontario Savings Bond – provincial bonds; Saskatchewan Savings Bond – provincial bonds	–

== See also ==
- Government bond
- Government debt
