= Savings bond =

A savings bond is a government bond designed to provide funds for the issuer while also providing a relatively safe investment for the purchaser to save money, typically a retail investor. The earliest savings bonds were the war bond programs of World War II. Examples of savings bonds include:

- Canada Savings Bond
  - Ontario Savings Bond
  - Saskatchewan Savings Bond
- Japanese Government Bonds for Retail Investors
- United States Savings Bonds
