= Obligation assimilable du Trésor =

French government bond

OATs (Obligations assimilables du Trésor) are government bonds issued by Agence France Trésor (French Treasury), generally by auction according to an annual calendar published in advance. These fungible securities are issued with maturities of seven to 50 years, and have become the method of choice for placing the French government's long-term debt.

== See also ==
- List of government bonds
- BTF
- BTAN
