= Reich Debt Administration =

German government body, 1900–1946

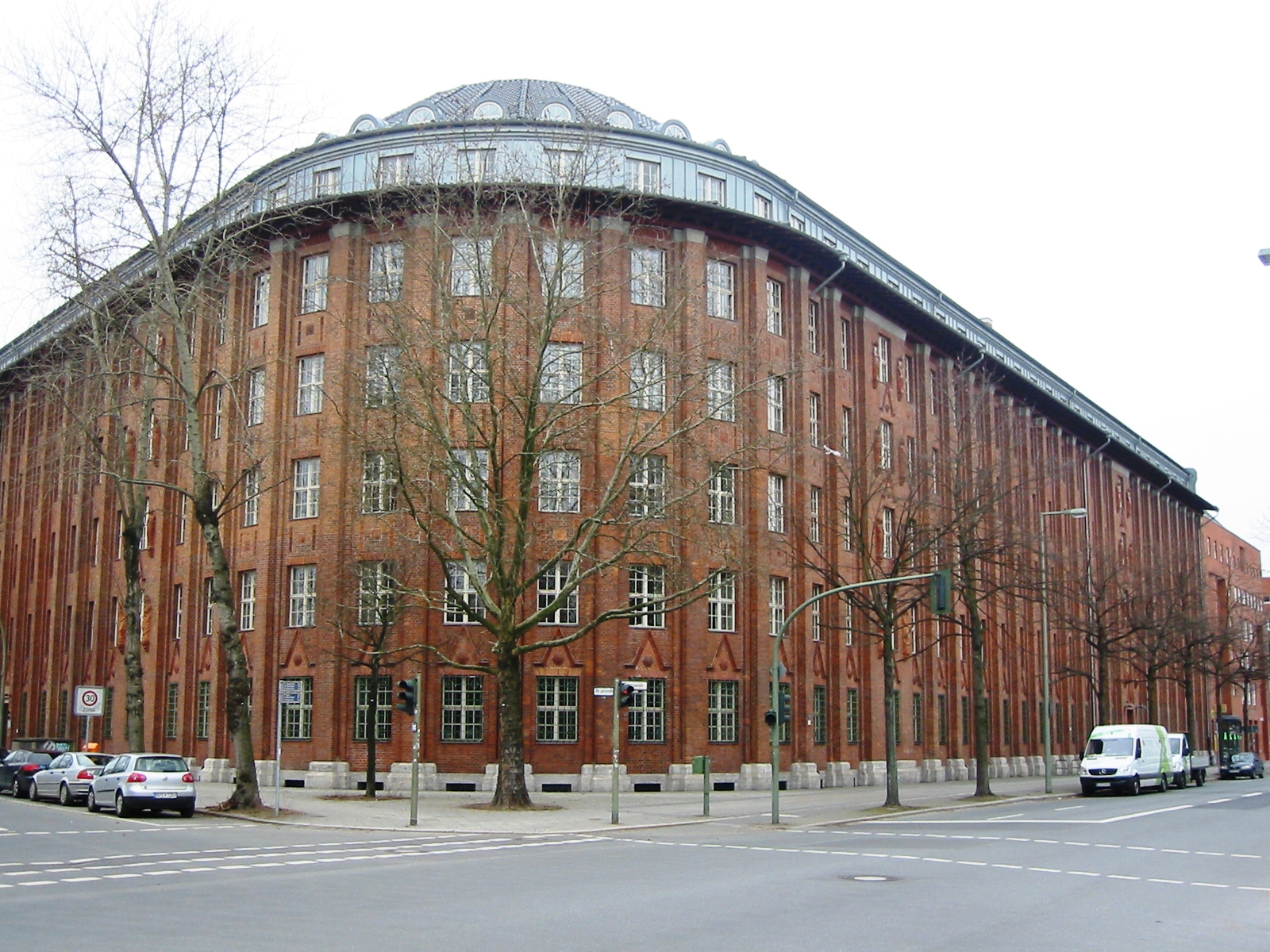
Building of the former Reich Debt Administration in Berlin-Kreuzberg, Oranienstraße / Alte Jakobstraße; built 1919–1924 by architect German Bestelmeyer

The Reich Debt Administration (German: Reichsschuldenverwaltung) was the entity responsible for managing German state debt from 1900 until 1946.

== Prussian origins ==
The organisation was founded in 1820 as the Prussian government debt administration with Christian von Rother as its first president. After the granting of the Constitution of Prussia (1850), public debt management was reorganized. Although the main administration remained a separate authority from the general financial administration, it was subordinate to the Prussian Ministry of Finance. With the founding of the North German Confederation in 1867 and the German Empire in 1871, the authority extended its remit over the newly unified territories. also took over debt management for the respective federal territory. It also undertook the conversion of bonds issued in legacy currencies into the new mark currency.

== German Empire ==
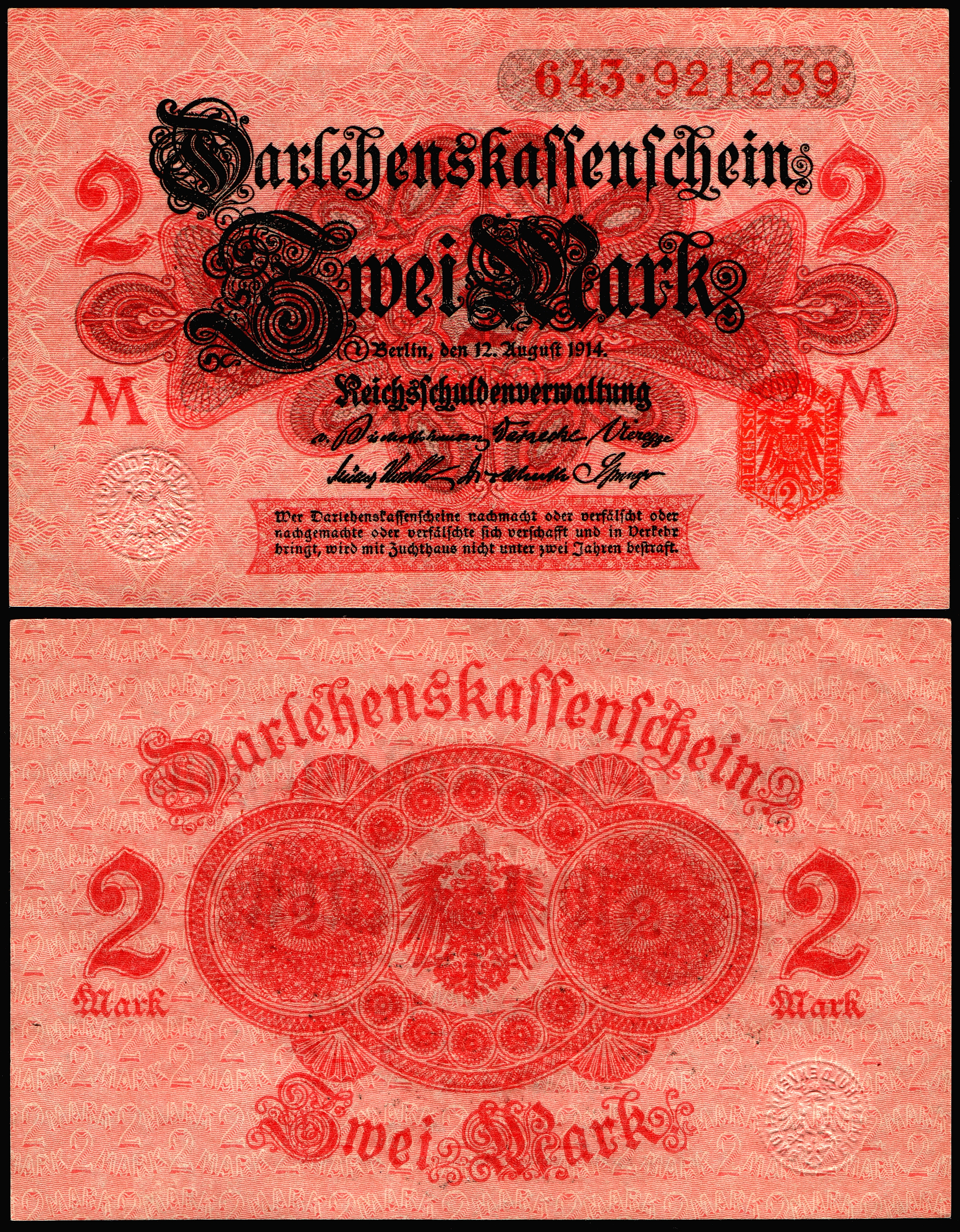
Reich Debt Administration 2 Mark paper currency 1914

In 1900 the organisation was renamed the Reich Debt Administration when the first Reich Debt Ordinance was issued. This summarized various older laws on the acceptance and administration of the Reich debts. At the same time, the main administration of the national debt was renamed the Reich Debt Administration. The nominal leadership lay with the Reich Chancellor.

During the Empire, the Commission that oversaw the Reich Debt Administration consisted of six members each from the Federal Council and the Reichstag. Added to this was the President of the Reich Audit Office. In addition to supervising the Reich Debt Administration, the Commission also supervised the Reich War Treasury and the Reich Disability Fund. For the latter task, the Commission was strengthened by another five members. The Commission was also responsible for issuing, confiscating and destroying Reich banknotes from the Reichsbank.

== Weimar Republic ==
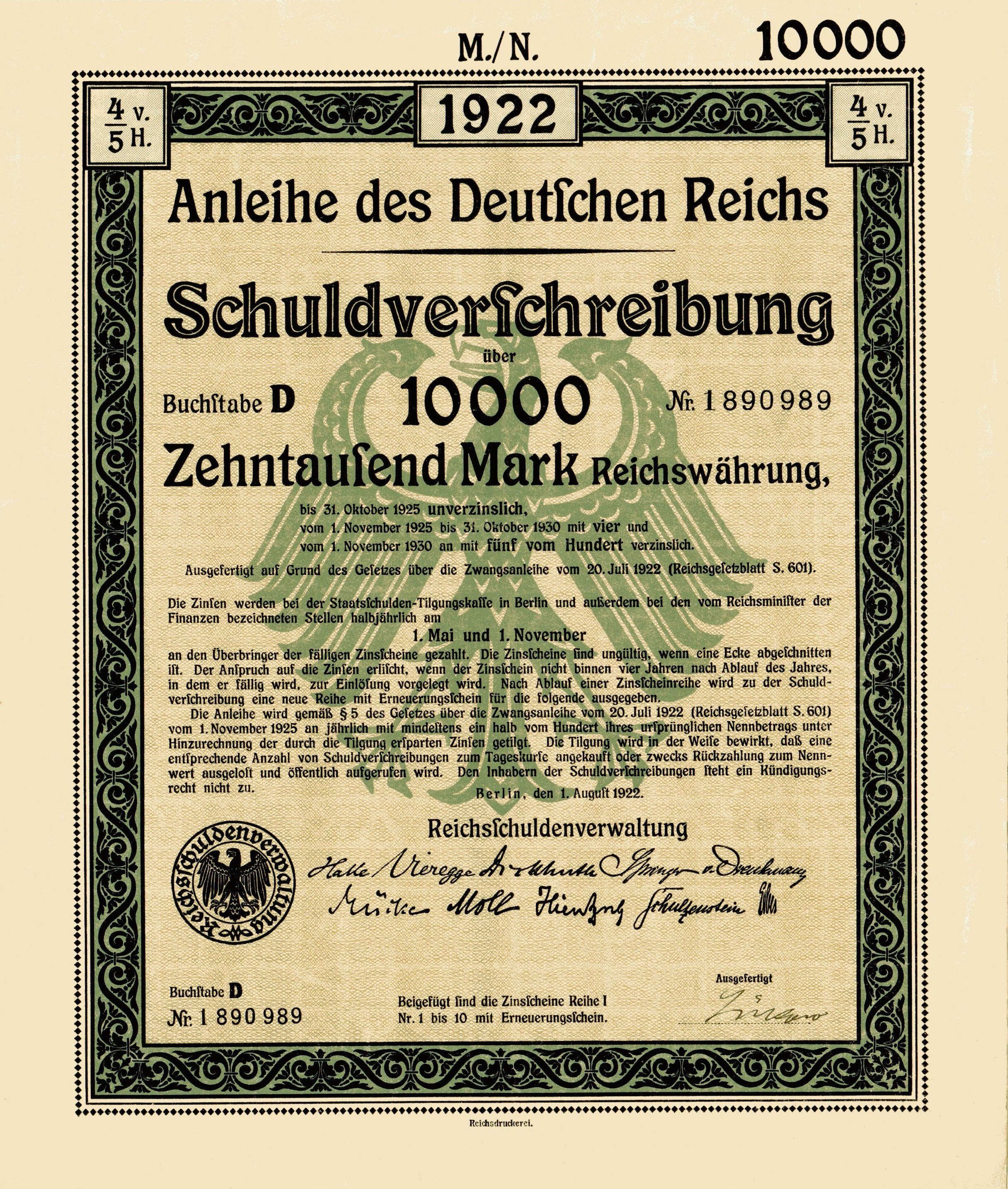
Reich Debt Administration 10,000 Mark note, 1922

A second Reich debt code was passed in 1924 after the currency reform. This clarified the type of borrowing and at the same time confirmed the independence of the authority. In the same year, the administration moved into its new building in Berlin.

== Nazi and post-war periods ==
After the beginning of National Socialist rule, the right to approve loans was transferred from the Reichstag to the Reich government as part of the Enabling Act of 1933.

Most of the debt register files were destroyed by air raids in 1945. In 1946, debt management was assigned to the Allied Military Command. In March 1948, the Reich Debt Administration was renamed the “Management Group for Archives of the Former Reich Debt Administration”. In July of the same year, a debt administration of the United Economic Area was established. The Federal Debt Administration emerged from this in 1949. This was renamed the Federal Securities Administration in 2002. In August 2006, this was merged into the German Finance Agency.

== Commission heads ==
- 1820-1848: Christian von Rother
- 1848-1861: Heinrich August Christian Nathan
- 1861-1874: Busso von Wedell
- 1874-1879: Botho Heinrich zu Eulenburg
- 1879-1892: Friedrich Hermann Sydow
- 1892-1905: Otto von Hoffmann
- 1905-1907: Rudolf von Bitter the Younger
- 1907-1918: Alexander von Bischoffshausen
- 1918-1928: Carl Halle
- 1929-1944: Ernst Articus
- 1945-22. May 1945: Oskar Georg Fischbach
- 1945-1951: Siegfried Schultzenstein
- 1948-1955: Wilhelm Dieben
