= BTF =

BTF may refer to the following:

- Back to the Future, film and/or film series.
- Baseball Think Factory, website
- Benzotrifluoride, an alternative name of trifluorotoluene
- Bidirectional texture function
- BigTIFF, picture format
- blessthefall, a metalcore band
- BTF (finance), French Treasury bills

== Places ==
- Berkshire Theatre Festival, arts venue in Massachusetts, United States
- Bottesford railway station, Leicestershire, England (station code: BTF)
- Skypark Airport, Bountiful, Utah, United States (IATA code: BTF)

== Organizations ==
- Bhindranwale Tiger Force of Khalistan, Sikh militant group
- Bhutan Tiger Force
- Brain Trauma Foundation, American organisation
- British Tamils Forum
- British Thyroid Foundation
- British Transport Films
- British Triathlon Federation, governing body for triathlon and multisport
