= Bonnie Lysyk =

Former Auditor General of Ontario

13th Auditor General of Ontario
- In office 3 September 2013 – 3 September 2023
- Preceded by: Jim McCarter
- Succeeded by: Shelley Spence

Personal details
- Education: University of Manitoba

Bonnie Lysyk was the Auditor General of Ontario from 2013 to 2023. Previously, she was Provincial Auditor of Saskatchewan, and Deputy Auditor General and Chief Operating Officer of Manitoba.

During her tenure as Auditor General of Ontario, significant issues addressed in her reports include the "unacceptably large" gas-fired power plant cancellations in 2013; the disagreement with the government over the treatment of public sector pension plan surpluses/deficits in the provincial budget; the "needlessly complex" use of "rate-regulated accounting" under the Fair Hydro plan; the "disorganized and inconsistent" response to the COVID-19 pandemic; and the lack of necessary environmental and economic analysis in the decision to release land from Toronto's Greenbelt.

== Early life and education ==
A native of Winnipeg, Lysyk earned a Bachelor of Administrative Studies (Honours) degree from the University of Manitoba, and obtained her designation as a Chartered Accountant while working with Coopers & Lybrand (now PricewaterhouseCoopers). She has a Masters in Business Administration and is a Certified Internal Auditor.

== Career ==
Lysyk was appointed as Saskatchewan's Provincial Auditor in April 2011. Before that, she served as Deputy Auditor General and Chief Operating Officer of Manitoba. She held a variety of senior roles at Manitoba Hydro, and was Chief Audit Executive of the Manitoba Liquor Control Commission.

Lysyk served as the 13th Auditor General of Ontario from 3 September 2013 to 3 September 2023. She completed 168 reports during her time in the role.

== Major issues during Lysyk's tenure as Auditor General of Ontario ==
=== Gas-fired power plant cancellations ===
In 2013, Auditor General Bonnie Lysyk found that intervention from staff in former Premier Dalton McGuinty's office increased the cost of the cancellation of two gas-fired power plants. Lysyk reported that cancellation of the Oakville plant would have a net cost of at least $675 million, and possibly as much as $810 million, well above the initial $40 million government estimate. This followed the $275 million net cost of canceling the Mississauga plant (at a cost of $351 million and associated savings of about $76 million). The approximately one billion dollar expense was far higher than it needed to be according to Lysyk, as the government did not take advantage of contract provisions that protected the province. Following the release of Auditor General Lysyk's audit of the Oakville plant, premier Kathleen Wynne said the cost of cancelling the plants was "unacceptably large" and she vowed to ban political staff from interfering with commercial transactions.

=== Treatment of public sector pension plans in the public accounts ===
In Ontario's 2015/2016 public accounts, Auditor General Lysyk was concerned that two public sector pension plans discounted plan liabilities at 6.25%, which is higher than the 2.2% on Ontario Savings Bonds and even above the rates the plans themselves use (4.8% and 5.55%) — "a particular sticking point" for Lysyk. Public Sector Accounting Standards allow some flexibility in choice of discount factors, but a study from the C.D. Howe Institute said that using a lower discount rate would be more appropriate and would not show pension surpluses, but deficits "and likely big ones."

Also, Lysyk argued that the Ontario Teachers' Pension Plan (OTPP) and the Ontario Public Service Employees' Union Pension Plan surpluses should not be included in the budget since the government does not have access to the surpluses without first receiving the formal written consent of plan members. Premier Kathleen Wynne disagreed, and set up an expert advisory panel that concluded it would be misleading to not include the province's share in the budget surplus. The panel reasoned that the government could use the surpluses to lower contributions required for the plans. However, Lysyk noted projections of the surpluses as assets did not mention a plan to use the monies in that way, and the fact that the OTPP was using some of its surplus to partially restore inflation increases (rather than reducing contributions) was viewed as support for the Auditor General's interpretation.

As Auditor General Lysyk was unwilling to approve the treatment of public sector pensions in Ontario's consolidated financial statements, the Ontario government took the unprecedented move to issue unaudited statements. Audited statements were released shortly thereafter, and in documents later released the province's reported debt increased by $10.7 billion and its annual deficit worsened from $3.5 to $5.0 billion, consistent with Lysyk's accounting.

=== The Fair Hydro Plan ===
In 2017 the government planned to borrow to reduce consumer electricity prices, which had been rising due to a shift away from coal-fired to renewable power generation in the early 2000s. With an upcoming election, it wanted to have a balanced budget. To avoid having the borrowing expense, and the debt, show up in the province's financial statements, the Wynne government announced the Fair Hydro Plan which employed "rate-regulated accounting." This is a concept used in the United States' generally accepted accounting principles (GAAP) standards whereby power rates would be reduced, and revenue to pay the cost would be collected through future billing of customers.

The Ontario government's justification for using the U.S. GAAP standard was that the International Financial Reporting Standards used in Ontario did not contain any allowance for rate-regulated accounting. Auditor General Lysyk said the Wynne government created a "needlessly complex" scheme, and she disagreed that the deferred rate recovery could be called a "regulatory asset." She said that "borrowings are debt; unearned revenue is not an asset today; and when your expenses exceed your revenues, you incur a deficit." Further, Lysyk said she was concerned that if the government was successful in concealing its borrowing, it would encourage the use of inappropriate accounting and "you'll do it again and you'll do it again" so "Pretty soon they won't have any numbers that will have any integrity behind them."

=== COVID-19 pandemic response ===
Premier Doug Ford said he had "serious, serious problems" with Auditor General Lysyk's report on Ontario's handling of the COVID-19 pandemic, which Lysyk said was "disorganized and inconsistent." She also said the long-term care sector was not prepared or equipped to handle the pandemic, and that Ontario's chief medical officer of health, Dr. David Williams, "did not lead" and did not fully exercise his powers. Premier Doug Ford accused Lysyk of overstepping her role, saying "Don't start pretending you're a doctor or health professional" and "Stick with the number crunching." However, accounting practitioners argue the Auditor General's role has always encompassed more than just "number crunching," and as the government's remit has increased over time, so too has that of the Auditor General.

=== Toronto's Greenbelt ===
Auditor General Lysyk's August 9, 2023 report revealed that Ryan Amato, the chief of staff to Housing Minister Steve Clark, drove the process that led to 15 parcels of land being removed from the Greenbelt area around Toronto, creating a potential $8.3 billion gain for a select group of developers. Before her report was released, Ontario Premier Doug Ford said the issue was outside her scope. Two prominent developers, took Lysyk's office to court in an effort to block her efforts to speak with them for the Greenbelt report. Lysyk determined that the Greenbelt decision was "seriously flawed" and lacked the necessary environmental and financial analysis. She said nothing in her report indicates anything criminal took place, but "what we see here is an ethical issue."

== Other professional activity ==
Lysyk has been a member of the Canadian Council of Legislative Auditors, and the Committee of Professional Conduct of the Canadian Institute of Actuaries. She has served on the Board of the Canadian Audit and Accountability Foundation (CCAF-FCVI Inc.) and she has taught auditing courses in Toronto and overseas.

Upon completing her term as Auditor General of Ontario, Lysyk said she did not plan to retire, and is interested in becoming involved in the finance or energy sectors. On 7 October 2024, Lysyk was named executive vice-president of enforcement with the Ontario Securities Commission.

== Awards and recognition ==
In 2017, Lysyk was named a Fellow of the Chartered Professional Accountants (CPA) of Ontario a distinction that formally recognizes CPAs who have rendered exceptional service to the profession and in their communities.

Lysyk is the recipient of the 2020 Distinguished Leader Award from Brock University's Goodman School of Business.
