= EPQ =

EPQ may refer to:

- Economic production quantity
- Épargne Placements Québec, an administrative unit of the Quebec Ministry of Finance
- Extended Project Qualification, in the United Kingdom
- Eysenck Personality Questionnaire
