= Ernst Articus =

- Born: 16 October 1876; Berlin
- Died: 25 July 1947 (aged 70); Dahlem, Berlin, Germany
- Occupations: Lawyer, civil servant

Ernst Articus (16 October 1876 – 25 July 1947) was a German lawyer and civil servant.

== Early life ==
Ernst Articus was born on 16 October 1876 in Berlin. He became a lawyer, and in 1904 was appointed a court assessor. In 1905 he became a government assessor for the Prussian agricultural management office. In 1911 he became a councilor in the Prussian Ministry of Agriculture, and in 1914 director of the Eigene Scholle state company for Brandenburg Land Management. After 1915 he was appointed lecturer and adviser in the Prussian Ministry of Agriculture.

In 1918 Articus was made president of the Higher Regional Court of Culture, and in 1920 Assistant Secretary in the Prussian Ministry of Agriculture. From 1920 to 1929 he was the deputy commissioner of the State of Prussia in the Reichsrat. From 1929 to 1944 Articus was president of the Reich Debt Commission (Reichsschuldenverwaltung) where he replaced Carl Halle. In 1945 he was replaced by Oskar Georg Fischbach.

Articus died on 25 July 1947 His death is registered at the civil registry office in Berlin-Zehlendorf Nr. 1476/1947.

== Sources ==
- "Articus, Ernst". Bundesarchiv.
- Christen, Peter (2016), The Loans of the German Third Reich, International Bond & Share Society
- "Präsidenten der Schuldenverwaltung". Bundesrepublik Deutschland ‒ Finanzagentur GmbH.
