= Provincial government response to the COVID-19 pandemic in Ontario =

The following had been the provincial governmental response to the COVID-19 pandemic in Ontario.

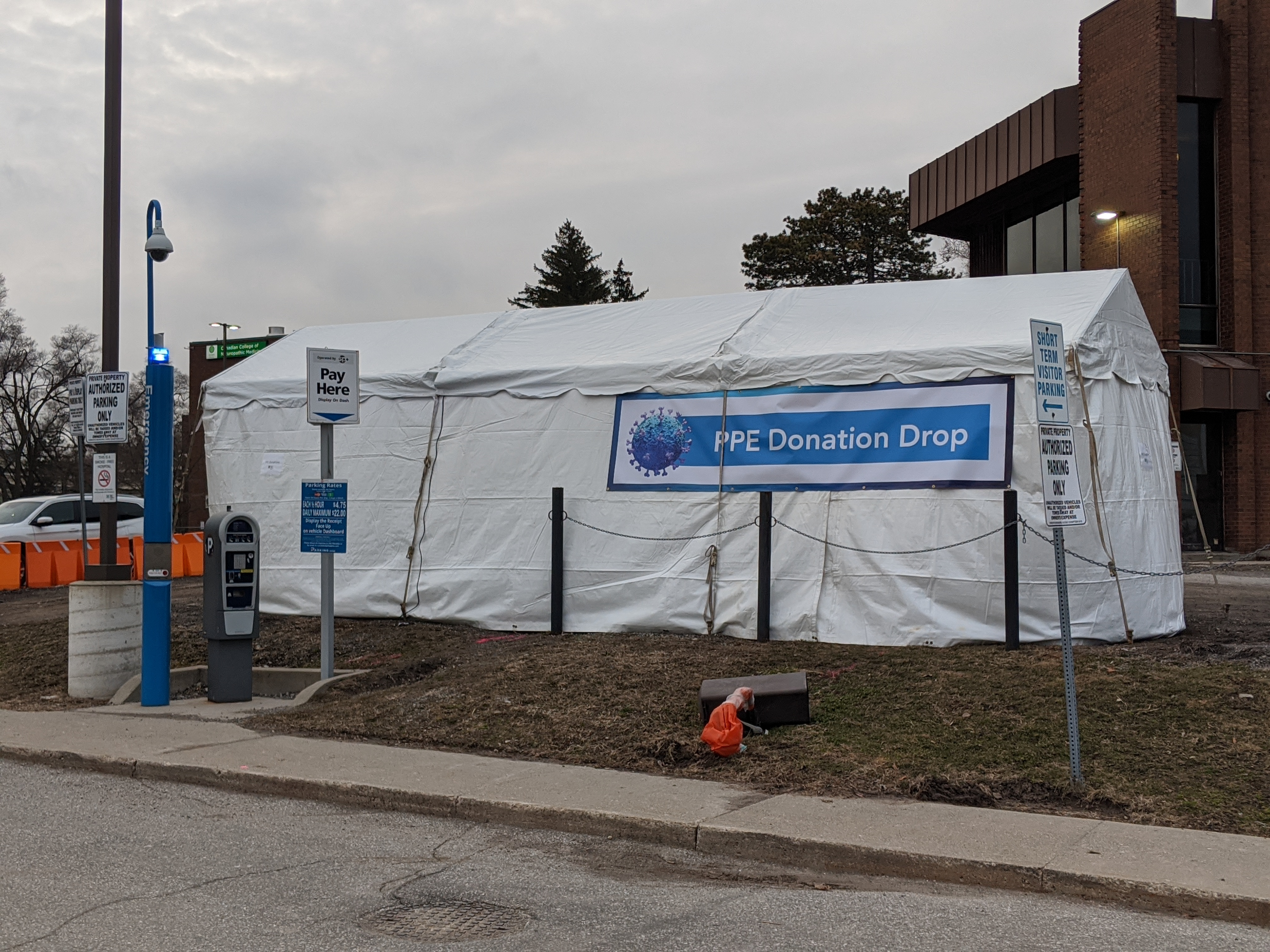
Personal protective equipment donation tent at North York General Hospital.

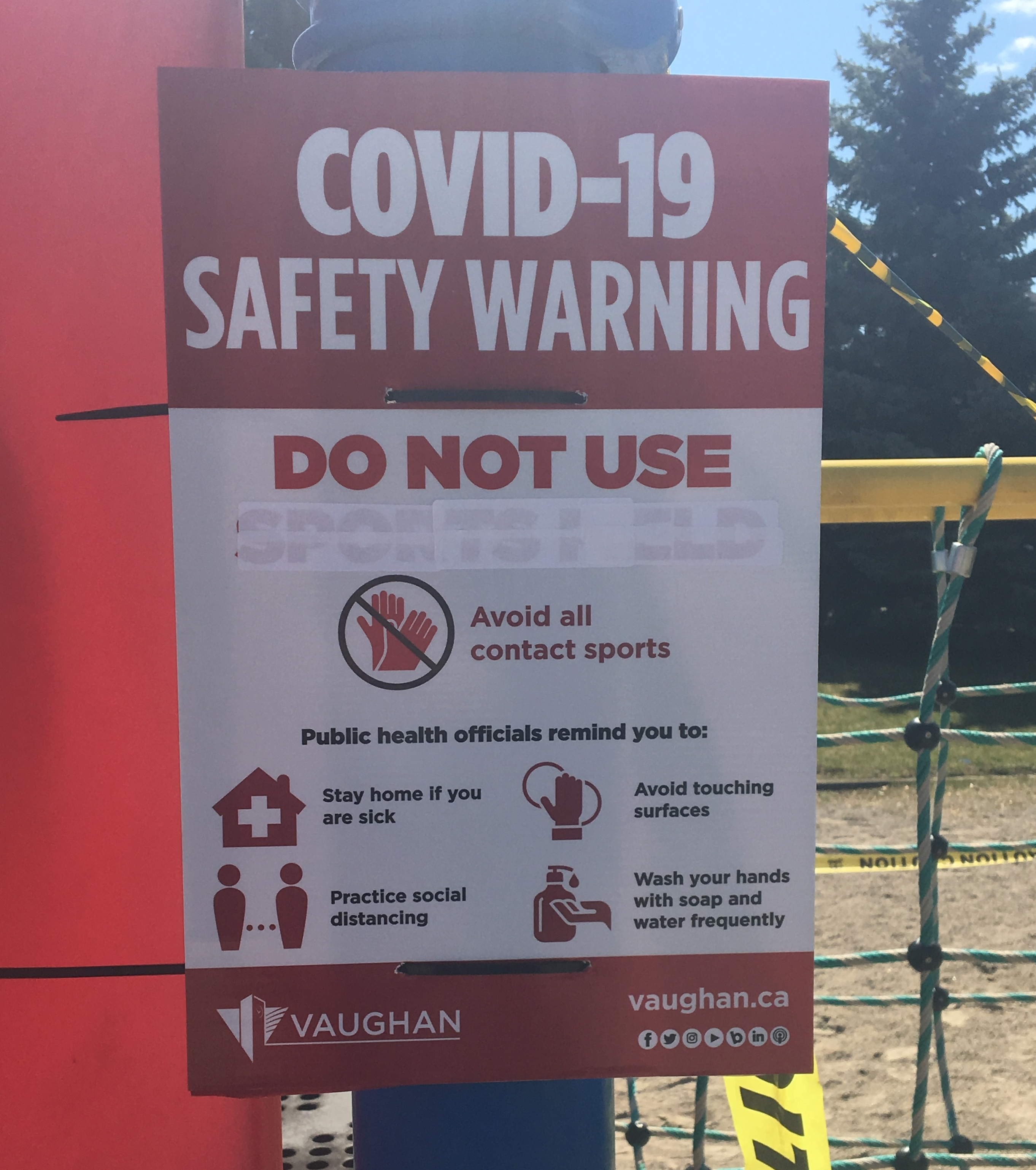
COVID-19 safety notice on playground equipment at a park in Vaughan

An Alert Ready message sent out on March 27, 2020 as seen on an iPhone 11 using iOS 13.

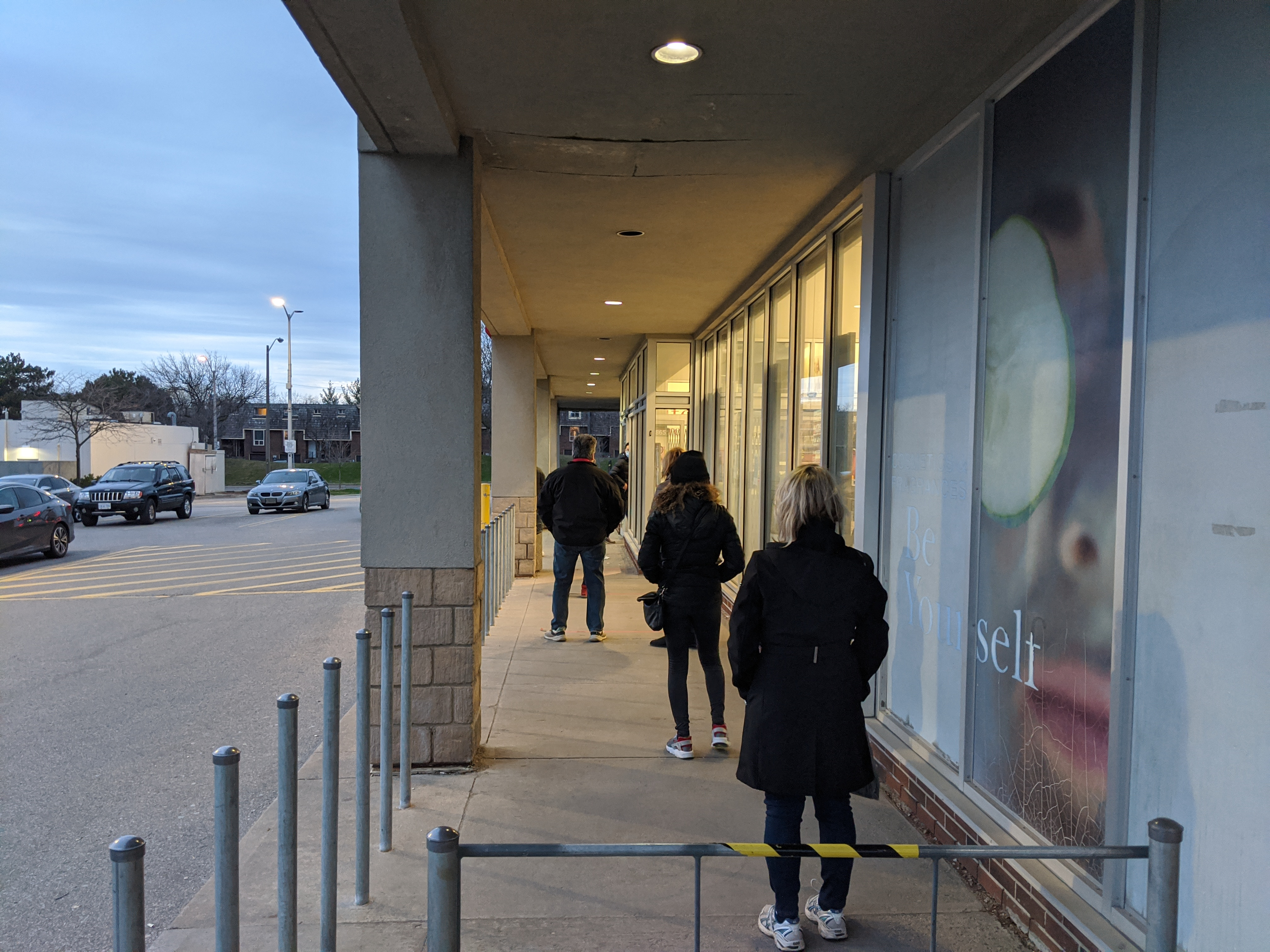
Social distancing at a Shoppers Drug Mart store in the former city of North York

== Initial response ==
On March 15, 2020, Ontario Lottery and Gaming Corporation (OLG) ordered the closure of all provincial casinos. On March 17, 2020, Premier Ford declared a provincial state of emergency, prohibiting public gatherings larger than 50 people, and ordering the closure of all schools, child care services, libraries, indoor recreation facilities, dine-in bars and restaurants, and all cinemas, theatres, and concert venues. Ford stated the "vast majority" of businesses were not affected by the order, promising that "essential services and essential needs will be available to every individual and families.

On March 20, 2020, further measures were announced, including waiving the three-month waiting period for Ontario Health Insurance Plan (OHIP) coverage, the launch of an e-learning portal, and extended privileges for hospitals to re-deploy staff.

On March 23, 2020, Ford ordered all "non-essential" businesses closed by 11:59 p.m. A list of 74 "essential" businesses was published later in the day. On March 27, 2020, at 2:00 p.m. ET, Alert Ready was activated on all radio stations, television broadcasters and LTE wireless networks in Ontario, broadcasting an emergency alert warning those returning from international travel of their obligation to self-isolate for 14 days under the Quarantine Act.

On March 30, 2020, the Ontario government extended the state of emergency through April 13, 2020, and also ordered the province-wide closure of all outdoor recreational amenities, including beaches, playgrounds and sports facilities (several Ontario municipalities including Toronto, had already ordered similar closures of their recreational amenities several days prior to the province-wide order).

On April 3, 2020, it was announced the number of "essential" businesses would be reduced to 44 beginning 11:59 p.m. on April 4, 2020; this included Ontario Cannabis Store and the halting of most non-essential construction, including industrial construction, and residential construction that did not begin before April 4, 2020, but excluding "critical" infrastructure projects. On May 27, 2020, all existing public health orders were extended through June 9, 2020.

On April 27, 2020, Premier Ford released "A Framework for Reopening our Province", a roadmap detailing a "gradual" lifting of economic restrictions. The process was divided into three stages, with the first intending to allow reopening outdoor spaces, businesses that can "immediately meet or modify operations" to allow a larger number of participants in certain types of gatherings and allow the resumption of some non-elective medical procedures. Stage 2 would allow additional businesses and outdoor spaces to reopen, and increase the limit on participants in gatherings. Stage 3 would contain further relaxation of prior restrictions, although restrictions on large public gatherings will remain in place indefinitely. After the process began in mid-May, the entirety of the province reached Stage 3 in mid-August.

On 19 May, 2020, the provincial government established the Long-Term Care COVID-19 Commission to investigate the problems associated with the response of long-term care facilities to the pandemic. The commission's report was released on 30 April 2021.

On June 12, 2020, Chief Medical Officer of Health David Williams issued guidelines for "social circles" — allowance for families to expand their interactions with up to 10 people (including themselves) from outside of their immediate household.

On September 17, 2020, in response to a surge in new cases in parts of the province, it was announced that the maximum size of "unmonitored social gatherings and organized public events" in the Ottawa, Peel, and Toronto regions would be reduced from 50 people indoors and 100 outdoors, to 10 indoors and 25 outdoors. Organizers of events that violate this restriction can be fined a minimum of $10,000, on top of the existing $750 fine for violating Ontario public health orders. Ford stated that the rule was primarily intended to target events occurring in parks and private locations and that staffed facilities not targeted under the rule (such as banquet halls, cinemas, convention centres, and restaurants) have employed safety protocols compliant with the province's health guidance.

On September 19, the aforementioned restrictions on private gatherings were extended province-wide. On September 25, it was announced that effective September 26 province-wide, strip clubs would be ordered closed, and that all bars, restaurants and nightclubs would be required to end the sale of alcoholic beverages at 11:00 p.m. and close their dining rooms between midnight and 5:00 a.m. nightly.

On October 2, Premier Ford announced that the wearing of face masks would become mandatory province-wide in all public spaces and workplaces when social distancing is not possible, effective October 3. A number of health regions had already implemented similar mandates at the regional level.

In addition, new restrictions were introduced in the Ottawa, Peel, and Toronto regions; bars and restaurants must collect contact information from all patrons for contact tracing purposes, and are capped at a capacity of 100 people and six patrons per table. Event facilities were capped at a capacity of 50 people total (rather than 50 per room) and also subject to the six-person cap. Gyms are also capped at 50 patrons, and exercise classes were capped at 10.

Due to heightened cases in the regions, Peel, Ottawa, and Toronto were rolled back to Modified Stage 2 from October 10 to November 7, reinstating closures of indoor dining areas, casinos, cinemas and theatres, gyms, and personal care services that require the removal of face masks. All gatherings are capped at 10 people indoors and 25 outdoors, and team sports are restricted to practices only, with scrimmages and games prohibited. Wedding receptions were also prohibited following the Thanksgiving long weekend. Schools and places of worship will continue operations. On October 16, it was announced that York Region would also be placed under Modified Stage 2 beginning October 19.

On November 25, a report was released by Auditor General Bonnie Lysyk which found that Ontario's initial response to COVID-19 was "slower and more reactive relative to most other provinces and many other international jurisdictions" (in contrast to its response to the SARS outbreak during the early 2000s). The report found that Public Health Ontario had a "diminished role" in the response, including the province's Central Co-ordination Table for COVID-19 consisting largely of deputy ministers rather than public health officials such as Chief Medical Officer of Health David Williams (who acted primarily on the advice of Ontario's Health Command Table), and ignoring recommendations made by public health officials.

=== Lifting of restrictions after the first wave ===
On May 14, 2020, it was announced that Stage 1 of Ontario's lifting of restrictions would begin May 20, focusing primarily on "workplaces that are well-positioned to follow public health advice to maintain physical distancing, implement workplace safety guidance and limit gatherings". Certain outdoor recreation activities that are part of Stage 1 were allowed to resume on May 16, for the Victoria Day long weekend.

On June 8, it was announced that Stage 2 would be implemented across most of the province, excluding 10 Southern Ontario health regions primarily in the Greater Toronto and Hamilton Area and along the Canada–United States border (such as Windsor-Essex) due to a large number of active cases. In addition, Ford announced that the cap on gathering sizes would be increased to ten province-wide regardless of phase, and that there would be a moratorium on evictions through the end of August of small businesses which are eligible for the Canada Emergency Commercial Rent Assistance program. On June 15, the Durham, Halton, Haldimand-Norfolk, Hamilton, Lambton, Niagara, and York health regions were allowed to enter Stage 2.

On June 22, it was announced that Peel and Toronto would be allowed to enter Stage 2 on June 24. Windsor-Essex was still excluded from Stage 2 due to outbreaks involving the agriculture industry. On June 24, it was announced that most of Windsor-Essex would be allowed to enter Stage 2 on June 25, excluding Kingsville and Leamington, the two southernmost towns in Canada.

On July 3, Premier Ford stated that he did not have a specific timetable for Stage 3; "You see what's happening [in the United States] when you move too quickly, you see what's happening south of the border. We don't want that happening up here."

By August 12, after a region-by-region roll-out, all regions in Ontario had entered Stage 3. On September 8, in response to growing case numbers, the provincial government announced a moratorium on further lifting of restrictions (such as expansion of "social circles" and gatherings) for at least four weeks, besides those already ongoing (such as schools, and reopening of selected casinos on September 26).

Stages of Reopening (First Wave - 2020)
Stage	Effective date(s)	Restrictions lifted	Notes
1	May 14: Outdoor activities; May 16	Stage 1 includes eased restrictions on the following: Industry/retail: Construction; Shopping (provided it has street-front access); Motor-vehicle dealerships; Media operations; Non-essential professional services; Outdoor recreation: Seasonal business (e.g. golfing); Individual sporting; Care/household Services: Non-emergency healthcare; Services for animals; Libraries (pick-up/delivery only); Indoor/outdoor household services	
2		Province-wide, regardless of their stage or not, were given some looser restrictions. Social gatherings were extended to include up to ten people. Places of worship are allowed to operate at 30 percent of their normal capacity. Stage 2 allowed certain businesses to reopen, with heavy restrictions: Personal and personal care services; Restaurants & bars (outdoor patio service only); Shopping malls & centres; Photography; Film & TV; Tour & guide services; Water recreational facilities; Outdoor recreational facilities; Beaches, parks & camping; Outdoor recreational team sports; Drive-in & drive-thru venues; Weddings, funerals and similar gatherings; Libraries; Community centres; Attractions & heritage institutions; Small outdoor events (such as cultural celebrations, animal shows and fundraisers)	
3		Gatherings capped at 50 indoors and 100 outdoors.; Most businesses and activities not covered under Stage 2 (such as cinemas and theatres, dine-in restaurants, indoor gyms, recreation and attractions, etc.) are allowed to resume operations with social distancing and capacity limits enforced per industry, unless otherwise prohibited.; Certain activities remain prohibited, including amusement parks, bathhouses, buffet service, casino table games, dancing at bars or restaurants, overnight children's camps, oxygen bars, saunas, steam rooms, and contact sports that involve "prolonged" contact.	
Modified 2	October 10: Ottawa; October 10: Peel; October 10: Toronto; October 19: York	The following restrictions were re-implemented: Gatherings and public events capped at 10 indoors and 25 outdoors.; Casinos and gaming establishments, indoor dining areas, indoor cinemas, performing arts venues, and exhibits at museums/etc. that have a "high risk of personal contact" must close.; Team sporting events are prohibited.	

=== Second province-wide shutdown (December 26, 2020 – January 25, 2021) ===
On December 21, 2020, Premier Ford announced that in order to "save lives and prevent our hospitals from being overwhelmed in the coming weeks", a "strict" province-wide shutdown would begin in all health regions (regardless of their current status on the response framework) at 12:01 a.m. ET on December 26, 2020 (Boxing Day). This measure will last for 28 days. It was originally to last only 14 days in the northern regions of the province (north of Sudbury), but on January 7, 2021, it was announced that the province-wide shutdown will be extended in these regions to the same length as in Southern Ontario.

Indoor social gatherings that involve people from outside of one's immediate household are prohibited. Outdoor gatherings are limited to 10 people with social distancing. All non-essential businesses, retail outlets (which include all businesses deemed non-essential under the "Lockdown" tier of the response framework, as well as hardware stores and pet shops), cultural amenities, sports and recreation facilities (unless "being used by high-performance athletes and specified professional leagues"), and personal care services must close to the public. Essential retail businesses are subject to capacity limits stricter than those used under Lockdown (50 percent for supermarkets and pharmacies, 25 percent for liquor stores and allowable big-box stores that sell groceries). Bars and restaurants are prohibited from offering dine-in service. All drive-in or drive-through events are prohibited, excluding drive-in religious services.

All publicly funded schools remained closed to in-person classes (resuming remotely after the holiday break) until January 11, 2021, in Northern Ontario, and January 25, 2021, in Southern Ontario. Elementary schools were originally slated to reopen in Southern Ontario on January 11, but on January 7, it was announced that this would be delayed.

=== Second stay-at-home order (January 14 – March 8, 2021) ===
On January 12, 2021, citing models forecasting that Ontario's health care system will be "overwhelmed" with cases and mortality exceeding those of the first wave unless actions are taken, Premier Ford declared a second provincial state of emergency and announced stricter province-wide measures, to take effect on January 14, 2021, at 12:01 a.m. ET and last through at least February 11. These measures upgraded the province-wide shutdown to a stay-at-home order; all Ontario residents were required to remain at their homes unless conducting an activity deemed essential. Essential activities include shopping at grocery stores or pharmacies, receiving health care, exercise, or conducing essential work that cannot be performed remotely. Remote work was mandated where possible. The province states that what is considered "essential work" is based on "[the] best judgement and common sense of employers". Performing arts facilities were required to cease all operations, even for virtual streaming concerts. All other restrictions enacted under the province-wide shutdown remained in force, and the colour-coded response framework was officially considered "paused" due to the declaration of emergency.

Certain businesses, such as liquor stores, hardware stores, and stores offering delivery or curbside pickup services, were required to close from 8 p.m. to 7 a.m. nightly. Non-essential construction activity was also suspended. Outdoor gatherings were limited to five people, and guidance now recommends masks be worn outside (in addition to the existing indoor mandate) if social distancing is not possible. The closure of schools in Hamilton, Peel, Toronto, Windsor-Essex, and York was extended further to February 10.

The Ontario Provincial Police (OPP), municipal police departments, bylaw officers, and provincial workspace inspectors, had the authority to issue tickets to enforce the stay-at-home order and mask mandate, however they will not have the authority to stop drivers or pedestrians for questioning. Premier Ford stated plans for a compliance "blitz" of retail store inspections beginning the weekend of January 15. Results of the inspection "blitz" revealed 36 of 110 stores visited in violation of COVID-19 measures, or 70 percent compliance rate. The measures faced criticism for disproportionately favouring big box retailers, by not restricting the times of day in which they may offer curbside pickup or delivery services, or preventing them from selling non-essential goods. It also does not include funding to cover paid sick leave for essential and low-wage workers.

On February 8, 2021, Premier Ford announced that the declaration of emergency would expire, but that the stay-at-home order would be extended in the majority of health regions to allow a gradual reinstatement of the response framework. The order was first lifted on February 10 in Eastern Ontario's Hastings Prince Edward Public Health Unit, the Kingston, Frontenac and Lennox & Addington Health Unit, and the Renfrew County and District Health Unit. The stay-at-home order was expected to be lifted in most of Ontario on February 16, excluding Peel, Toronto, and York (expected to occur on February 22), and any other area where the province believes it is not yet safe to lift the order. This was later amended to exclude York and include North Bay-Parry Sound.

Even as the restriction is lifted, the province still encourages residents to stay at home whenever possible, and discourages social gatherings and non-essential travel (including travel between regions with different levels on the response framework). On February 19, 2021, York Region was announced to be moving to Red (Control) on February 22 while Toronto, Peel and North Bay-Parry Sound were to remain in a stay-at-home order until at least March 8. On March 5, 2021, the provincial government announced these last three regions would be moving to the response framework on March 8, officially ending stay-at-home orders originally in effect since January 14, 2021.

=== Regional advisory system ===
==== Response framework ====
Ontario COVID-19 Response Framework
Tier		Criteria	Description
1	Prevent	Weekly incidence rate per-capita (100,000) below 10; Test positivity under 0.5%; Basic reproduction number(Rt) less than 1; "Stable" level of community transmission	Focused on promotion and education of indefinite Stage 3 health measures until effective treatment or vaccine is widely available.
2	Protect	Weekly incidence rate per-capita between 10 and 24.9.; Test positivity between 0.5 and 1.2%, Rt approximately 1; "Repeated" outbreaks across sectors, or an increasing number of larger outbreaks.	Targeted enforcement and education is used to control increasing spread.
3	Restrict	Weekly incidence rate per-capita between 25 and 39.9; test positivity between 1.3 and 2.4%, Rt approximately 1 and 1.1, "Repeated" outbreaks across sectors and an increasing number of larger outbreaks and community transmission.; Contact tracing and hospital capacity "at risk of being overwhelmed"	Enhanced compliance measures are enforced to mitigate a heightened risk of infection.
4	Control	Weekly incidence rate per-capita is 40 or higher; Test positivity above 2.5%; Rt is 1.2 or higher; Increased community transmission; Contact tracing and hospital capacity "at risk or being overwhelmed"	Broader public health measures are employed to mitigate a severe risk of infection.
5	Lockdown	Trends continue to worsen after measures from Control level are implemented.	Wide-scale public health measures, including business and organizational closures, are employed as a last resort to control worsened spread.
6	Shutdown	An "emergency brake". At the discretion of the government of Ontario.	Similar to lockdown category, with restrictions on certain amenities.

==== Use during the second wave from November 7 – December 26, 2020 ====
On November 3, 2020, Premier Ford stated that future modifications of restrictions during the second wave will be performed regionally using a colour-coded "response framework". The framework went into place on November 7.

On November 11, it was reported by the Toronto Star that the Ford government had allegedly ignored recommendations by Public Health Ontario regarding the metrics used for the advisory system — which were four times narrower than what was actually implemented by the government.

Two days later, Premier Ford announced that the thresholds for each level would be decreased: for example, the criterion for the "Control" (Red) level was reduced from a weekly incidence rate of 100 or more per-capita, to 40 or more. Regions included in each tier were adjusted to match the new thresholds effective November 16. Ford stated that the original criterion was based on earlier models that had anticipated only 950–1,250 new cases per day by the time it was implemented and that he would not have used them if case numbers had reached the point they had on November 10.

==== Use during the third wave beginning February 8, 2021 ====
Due to the declaration of emergency and a stay-at-home order issued, the response framework was officially considered paused from December 26, 2020, to February 9, 2021. On February 8, 2021, Premier Ford announced that the response framework would be gradually reinstated to replace the stay-at-home order, beginning with the Hastings Prince Edward Public Health Unit, the Kingston, Frontenac and Lennox & Addington Health Unit, and the Renfrew County and District Health Unit on February 10 (which reopened into the "Prevent" tier). Unlike the earlier revision, the "Lockdown" tier will allow for non-essential retail with capacity limits (unless the region is subject to a stay-at-home order).

The framework is now subject to an "emergency brake", where regions may immediately be placed back in the "Lockdown" tier as a circuit breaker if health officials believe that the incidence rate is increasing too rapidly and the healthcare system is at a severe risk of being overwhelmed. As of March 26, health officials may impose a stricter lockdown (equivalent to the earlier province-wide shutdown) under the emergency brake as well.

On March 20, further amendments to the response framework were implemented for restaurants; outdoor dining is now permitted in regions in the "Lockdown" tier, and capacity limits for restaurants in the "Control" and "Restrict" tiers were increased from 10 and 50 customers respectively to 50 and 100, or 50 percent capacity, whichever is lower. Additional modifications were announced on March 26; as of March 29, the "Lockdown" category began to allow outdoor fitness classes of up to 10 people. Personal care services were to be allowed to operate by-appointment only at 25 percent capacity/5 people (whichever is fewer) in "Lockdown" regions beginning April 12. In addition, subject to physical distancing, capacity limits were removed for outdoor religious services (including funerals and weddings) in all regions.

=== Third province-wide shutdown and stay-at-home order (April 3 – June 2, 2021) ===
On April 1, 2021, amid rising new infections, particularly exacerbated by variants of concern and preceding the Easter weekend, Premier Ford announced a third province-wide shutdown beginning April 3. All regions were moved to a new sixth level of the response framework, "Shutdown" (white), re-imposing measures that were introduced during the first province-wide shutdown. This includes prohibiting all indoor organized events and gatherings, limiting outdoor gatherings to five people, capacity limits for retail (50 percent for essential retail, 25% for all other stores), and ordering the closure of all in-person dining (regardless of setting), daycamps, personal care services, sports and recreation facilities, meeting and event spaces, and cinemas, and capping capacity of religious services to 15 percent. All performing arts facilities must close, even for internet streaming events. The response framework is paused.

Premier Ford faced criticism over the new shutdown (which resulted in only minor changes for health regions already in the "Lockdown" tier), with Leader of the Opposition Andrea Horwath arguing that it was "a too little too late response by this government to what we knew was coming". On April 4, the medical officers of Ottawa, Peel Region, and Toronto sent a letter to the government requesting that a stay-at-home order be issued.

On April 7, 2021, Premier Ford declared a third state of emergency and announced that a third stay-at-home order will take effect at 12:01 a.m. ET on April 8, and last for four weeks. All Ontario residents must remain at their homes unless conducting an activity deemed essential. Essential activities include shopping at grocery stores or pharmacies, receiving health care, exercise, school, or conducting essential work that cannot be performed remotely. Remote work was mandated where possible. Ford explained that "the situation is evolving rapidly, hour by hour. And as things change, as we learn more about these deadly new variants, as we see new problems arise, we need to adapt. We need to move quickly and decisively. And right now, above all else, our plan is to get needles in the arms and protect our hospitals."

All shutdown restrictions and all other restrictions from the previous stay-at-home order apply. Furthermore, essential retail stores are only allowed to sell food, pharmacy items, and cleaning supplies, and all other non-essential goods are prohibited from being displayed or sold to in-store customers. In addition, retailers of assistive devices, automotive and equipment rental services, motor vehicle and boat dealers, vehicle and equipment repair services, prescription eyewear, safety supplies, and telecom services may operate at 25 percent capacity by appointment only. Following criticism of photos showing displays of cloth masks blocked by local Walmart stores, representatives of the government clarified that they were considered an essential good.

The order does not include paid sick leave; Premier Ford accused those advocating for paid sick leave of "playing politics", and not directing people to the Canadian Recovery Sickness Benefit (CRSB) instead (which is a retroactive payment), which he deemed sufficient.

==== Extension of the stay-at-home order and further restrictions ====
On April 16, 2021, Premier Ford announced that due to record high hospitalizations and cases, the stay-at-home order had been extended through at least May 20, and that several additional restrictions will also be imposed. Effective April 17, outdoor gatherings with anyone from outside of the immediate household are prohibited, all outdoor recreation amenities must close, allowable "big box" retail stores are restricted to 25 percent capacity, and all non-essential construction projects must be suspended. Beginning April 19, land travel into Ontario is restricted at the provincial border to essential purposes (transport of goods, medical care, work, and exercising treaty rights) only, and indoor places of worship are limited to 10 people. Furthermore, Solicitor General Sylvia Jones announced that police would receive enhanced authority to enforce the stay-at-home order, including being able to perform random stops of individuals they suspect are travelling in violation of the stay-at-home order. They could compel individuals to state their home address and purpose of travel; failure to comply with a request for this information would be a ticketable offence.

Premier Ford stated that "I have never shied away from telling you the brutal honest truth, never shied away from tough decisions and today I am here to do just that. My friends we are losing the battle between variants and vaccines", and that "we need to step up enforcement and we need to focus on those who are deliberately putting others at risk by ignoring the stay-at-home order."

The new measures faced criticism; the province did not introduce paid sick leave, the new police authority was criticized for resembling carding and having a disproportionate impact to BIPOC communities, while a number of municipal police departments announced that they would not perform random stops under the measure. On April 17, Jones announced that the new police authority would be narrowed to only allow them to stop and ticket individuals they suspect are participating in a public event or social gathering. Despite the changes, the revised measures elicited continued concerns.

Criticism has also been raised over the prohibition of outdoor recreation, due to outdoor spaces being considered to have a generally lower risk of transmission over indoor spaces, and calls for the provincial government to promote outdoor recreation for physical and mental health. The province backpedaled on restricting playgrounds, but the remainder of the order remains in effect.

On April 20, 2021, Peel Public Health issued a Section 22 order effective April 23, requiring any business that has been linked to five or more COVID-19 infections within the past 14 days to shut down for 10 days. All employees of the business must self-isolate for the duration, and it is "strongly recommended" that impacted employees be provided with paid leave. Peel Public Health stated that "workplace exposures in Peel Region continue to drive the region's high case counts of COVID-19. Expedited closure will also allow Peel Public Health to investigate workplace exposures without risk of continued spread." This order will not apply to healthcare, schools, or other "critical infrastructure". Toronto Public Health subsequently issued a nearly identical order.

On April 22, 2021, in his first public appearance since April 16, and while self-isolating due to being a close contact of a positive case within his staff, Premier Ford admitted that the new enforcement measures announced last Friday "went too far". He also announced that Ontario was working on developing a paid sick leave benefit, arguing that they needed to fill "gaps" in the CRSB that were not fulfilled by the 2021 federal budget, and that they planned to make it "the best program in North America". The province officially announced the temporary "COVID-19 Worker Income Protection Benefit Program" on April 29, providing up to three paid sick days for full-time or part-time workers, and paying up to $200 per day. Employers will be reimbursed via the Workplace Safety and Insurance Board (WSIB). The program will last through September 25, 2021 (the last day of the CRSB), and is retroactive to April 19, 2021.

On May 13, 2021, the stay-at-home order was extended by 14 days through June 2. Premier Ford stated that the additional time was necessary in order to ensure that "most normal July and August possible", but that this would not allow large public gatherings such as concerts or sporting events.

==== Transition from stay-at-home order and Step 1 ====
On May 20, 2021, alongside the announcement of a new roadmap for lifting restrictions, Ford announced that beginning May 22, outdoor recreation amenities would be allowed to reopen, and outdoor gatherings of up to five people would also be permitted.

On May 21, 2021, with warmer weather, splash pads were opened ahead of the Victoria Day weekend.

On June 2, 2021, the stay-at-home order officially expired, leaving the province with some restrictions, bans on outdoor activities like camping stayed closed.

On June 7, 2021, it was announced Ontario would enter Step 1 on June 11 at 12:01am.

=== Three-step roadmap for reopening ===
On May 20, 2021, Premier Ford announced a three-step plan to reopen the economy, based on vaccination rate goals. Initially, the province was to stay in each Step for a minimum of 21 days before moving onto the next. However, each reopening step was put in place before 21 days had passed.

Ontario COVID-19 three-step roadmap for reopening
Step	Start date	Vaccination requirement	Description
1	June 11, 2021	60% of adults (18+) have received at least one shot of COVID-19 vaccine	Sectors reopening: Outdoor gatherings 10+; Outdoor dining for tables of up to 4 people; Non-essential retail at 15%; Essential retail at 25%; Socially distant outdoor religious services, rites and ceremonies; Outdoor sports and fitness of up to 10 people; Day camps; Campsites and campgrounds; Outdoor zoos, landmarks, historic sites, and botanical gardens; Outdoor pools and wading pools; Short-term rentals; Ontario parks; Outdoor horse racing and motor speedways; Retail stores in malls closed unless the stores have a street-facing entrance
2	June 30, 2021	70% of adults (18+) have received at least one shot of COVID-19 vaccine and 20% have received full vaccination (both doses)	Sectors reopening: Outdoor gatherings of up to 25 people; Small indoor gatherings of up to 5 people; Outdoor dining of up to 6 people per table; Essential retail at 50%; Non-essential retail at 25%; Personal care services where face coverings can be worn at all times; Outdoor meeting and event spaces; Outdoor amusement and water parks; Outdoor boat tour operators; Outdoor county fairs and rural exhibitions; Outdoor sports leagues and events; Outdoor cinemas, performing arts, live music, events and attractions
3	July 16, 2021	70–80% of adults (18+) have received at least one shot of COVID-19 vaccine and 25% have received full vaccination (both doses)	Sectors reopening: Private indoor gatherings of 25 people are permitted and outdoor gatherings of 100 people are permitted; Essential and non-essential retail capacity is based on social distancing of two metres; Indoor religious services, rites, and ceremony gatherings capacity is based on physical distancing of two metres; Indoor meeting and event spaces at 50% capacity or 1,000 people maximum; Indoor dining is permitted with no table size limits, capacity limited to physical distancing of two metres; Indoor sports and recreational facilities are permitted to open at 50% capacity; Museums, galleries, historic sites, aquariums, zoos, landmarks, botanical gardens, science centres, casinos/bingo halls, amusement parks, fairs and rural exhibitions, festivals are permitted to 50% capacity indoors and 75% capacity outdoors; Concert venues, cinemas, and theatres permitted to operate at 50% capacity indoors or a total of 1,000 people for seated events, or 75% capacity outdoors or a total of 5,000 people for standing-room events; Personal care services that require the removal of face coverings are permitted as long as physical distancing of two metres can be maintained; Real estate open houses as long as physical distancing of two metres can be maintained; Nightclubs at 25% capacity or 250 people maximum
Beyond Step 3	To be determined	Further relaxation of restrictions was put on hold due to the Delta variant.	Relaxation of capacity and social distancing restrictions except in certain cases (such as hospitals and health clinics) however the mask mandate will continue to be in effect.

=== Proof of vaccination requirements begin (September 22, 2021–present) ===
On September 1, 2021, despite having initially been against the concept as to not create a "split society", Premier Ford announced that the province would mandate the presentation of proof of vaccination in order to access certain non-essential indoor businesses, effective September 22, 2021. The province announced plans to also develop a verifiable digital credential in QR code format. Ford criticized Prime Minister Justin Trudeau for not developing a domestic vaccine passport at the federal level, despite him having only previously called for one to be developed for international travel.

Patrons 12 years of age or older must present proof of full vaccination in order to access the indoor areas of the following settings, unless otherwise noted:

- Restaurants and bars (dine-in service)
- Nightclubs (including outdoor areas), strip clubs, bathhouses, and sex clubs
- Entertainment and gaming venues such as cinemas, concert halls, casinos, etc.
- Sports and recreation facilities, such as pools, gyms, and fitness centres, and the seating areas of indoor sports venues
  - There are exceptions for persons under 18 years of age that are participating in organized sports activities. However, some health units (such as Windsor–Essex County and Toronto) have revoked this exception and require all participants to be fully vaccinated, regardless of age. Effective December 20, 2021, this exception is removed province-wide.
- Meeting and event spaces
  - There are exceptions for the attendees of a funeral service or wedding ceremony. However, receptions are still subject to mandate.
- Racing facilities

Patrons must present the Ontario COVID-19 vaccination receipt and valid photo identification. Valid medical exemptions include adverse reactions to the first vaccine dose, or life-threatening allergies to vaccine ingredients, and must be issued by a doctor. On October 14, 2021, Ontario began to roll out proof of vaccination expressed as a QR code. They can be checked by businesses using the Verify Ontario mobile app. The app was developed in partnership with Maple Leaf Sports & Entertainment (MLSE).

Following the implementation of the proof of vaccination system, on September 25, 2021, certain venues where vaccination is mandated were given increased capacity limits. Most indoor facilities' capacity limits were increased to 50 percent or 10,000 people (whichever is higher). Certain outdoor venues where people stand were increased to 75 percent or 15,000 people (whichever is higher) and for outdoor venues where people are seated, this was increased to 75 percent or 30,000 people (whichever is higher).

On October 8, 2021, ahead of the opening of new seasons in the National Basketball Association (NBA) and in the National Hockey League (NHL), Premier Ford announced that capacity limits would be lifted for certain venues and events where proof of vaccination is required, including cinemas, theatres, and concerts, the seating areas of sports, recreation, and racing facilities, meeting and event spaces (subject to social distancing), and the studio audiences of commercial film and television productions.

This decision faced criticism from the restaurant industry for being a double standard, noting that indoor arenas would be allowed to operate at full capacity with nearly 20,000 spectators, but restaurants are still subject to capacity limits. An Ontario government spokesperson stated that restaurants were deemed a higher-risk setting due to patrons not wearing masks for prolonged periods. The involvement of MLSE—owner of most of Toronto's professional sports teams (Note: MLSE co-owner Rogers Communications fully owns the Toronto Blue Jays of Major League Baseball)—in the development of the Verify Ontario app was also scrutinized by the industry, who accused the provincial government of favouring the interests of larger corporations over small businesses. Ford denied the accusations, stating that the changes impacted multiple industries beyond just sports. MLSE stated that they were being a "good corporate citizen", and their involvement primarily involved refinements to a beta version of the app. They also highlighted other contributions they had made in support of the pandemic response, including use of their facilities as homeless shelters and vaccination sites.

On October 22, 2021, Premier Ford announced a long-term plan to eventually lift the remaining public health measures;

- On October 25, 2021, capacity restrictions were lifted for most facilities where proof of vaccination is presently required. This does not apply to specific "high-risk" settings, such as food and drink establishments (including wedding receptions) with dance floors, nightclubs, strip clubs, and sex clubs. Personal care services can operate at full capacity if all customers are fully vaccinated.
- By November 15, 2021, capacity limits were to be removed at other facilities and venues that are "high-risk" but require proof of vaccination.
- By January 17, 2022, the proof of vaccination requirement was to be removed for restaurants, sports facilities, and casinos. The requirement could be lifted from other venues over time.
- By March 28, 2022, all remaining province-wide health orders issued pursuant to the Reopening Ontario Act were to be revoked and lifted. Officials have stated that health measures may be reintroduced on a regional basis if needed.

On October 28, 2021, restrictions on the capacity of general admission indoor concerts were lifted, including the requirement that all patrons be seated. This was moved ahead from the original second step on November 15. On November 10, 2021, the lifting of capacity restrictions for "high-risk" venues was delayed for at least 28 days out of an abundance of caution due to rising indicators. On December 7, 2021, this was delayed indefinitely.

==== Omicron variant and rollback to Stage 2 (December 10, 2021–present) ====
On December 10, 2021, citing the spread of the Omicron variant, Ontario announced upcoming changes to the proof of vaccination requirements, which have henceforth been extended indefinitely. Beginning December 20, the previous exemption to the proof of vaccination requirement for youth under 18 years of age participating in organized sports was removed. Beginning January 4, 2022, only a certified QR code is accepted as valid proof of vaccination or medical exemption. Notes from physicians are no longer accepted effective January 10, 2022.

On December 15, 2021, Premier Ford announced that due to the Omicron variant, a 50 percent capacity limit would be reintroduced for meeting and event spaces, indoor sports venues with a capacity of over 1,000, and indoor entertainment venues. On December 17, Ford also announced that permissible social gatherings would be reduced to 10 people outdoors and 25 outdoors, and most indoor settings will be restricted to 50 percent capacity (unless being used for a faith-based ceremony). Mingling and dancing at bars and restaurants is prohibited. All venues were subject to a 10 p.m. last call for alcohol sales, and all bars, restaurants, and strip clubs must close to dining at 11 p.m. In addition, all event venues and casinos will be prohibited from serving food and beverages.

On December 30, 2021, Ontario further restricted venues to a maximum of 1,000 spectators or 50 percent capacity, whichever is less. MLSE announced that all Toronto Maple Leafs and Toronto Raptors home games will be played behind closed doors while this restriction is in effect.

On January 3, 2022, Premier Ford announced that to protect the hospital system, Ontario would be rolled back to modified Step 2 beginning January 5, 2022 for least 21 days:

- Remote work was mandated where possible
- Social gatherings are restricted to five people indoors and ten people outdoors.
- Schools returned to distance education.
- Retail, libraries, and personal care services are capped at 50 percent of capacity.
- Bars and restaurants must close to in-person dining.
- Elective procedures at hospitals will be suspended.
- Indoor meeting and event spaces, indoor sports facilities, indoor recreational fitness facilities (except for use by training Olympic and Paralympic athletes, or athletes of specified professional and elite amateur sports leagues), indoor entertainment facilities (including cinemas, concert venues, theatres, museums, etc.), landmarks, historical sites, and festivals must close, with some exceptions for outdoor events.
  - This effectively mandates that indoor sporting events must be held behind closed doors.
- Indoor weddings and funerals are capped at 50 percent capacity.

On January 20, 2022, the province announced plans to ease some of these restrictions beginning January 31, 2022:

- Beginning January 31, 2022
  - Social gatherings are restricted to 10 people indoors and 25 people outdoors.
  - Indoor bars and restaurants (without dance floors), indoor meeting and event spaces, indoor sports facilities, indoor recreational fitness facilities, indoor entertainment facilities, landmarks, and historical sites may reopen at 50 percent capacity.
  - Theatres, concert venues, and indoor arenas may reopen at a maximum capacity of 500 people or 50 percent capacity, whichever is less.
  - All proof of vaccination requirements remain in force.
- Beginning February 21, 2022
  - Social gatherings are restricted to 25 people indoors and 100 people outdoors.
  - Indoor public venues subject to proof of vaccination may operate at full capacity.
  - Indoor public venues without proof of vaccination must restrict capacity to allow two metres of social distancing.
  - Indoor religious ceremonies without proof of vaccination requirements must restrict capacity to allow two metres of social distancing.
  - Theatres, concert venues, and indoor arenas may operate at a maximum capacity of 50 percent.
  - Indoor "high risk" settings subject to proof of vaccination may operate at 25 percent capacity.
- Beginning March 14, 2022
  - Social gatherings are restricted to 50 people indoors, and no longer limited outdoors.
  - Capacity restrictions lifted for religious services.
  - Capacity restrictions lifted for indoor public venues.
  - All proof of vaccination requirements remain in force.

On March 21, 2022, all capacity restrictions, proof of vaccination requirements, and face masks are optional.

At least 21 days must elapse between each phase.

== See also ==
- COVID-19 protests in Canada
  - Canada convoy protest
