= Alexander von Bischoffshausen =

German painter

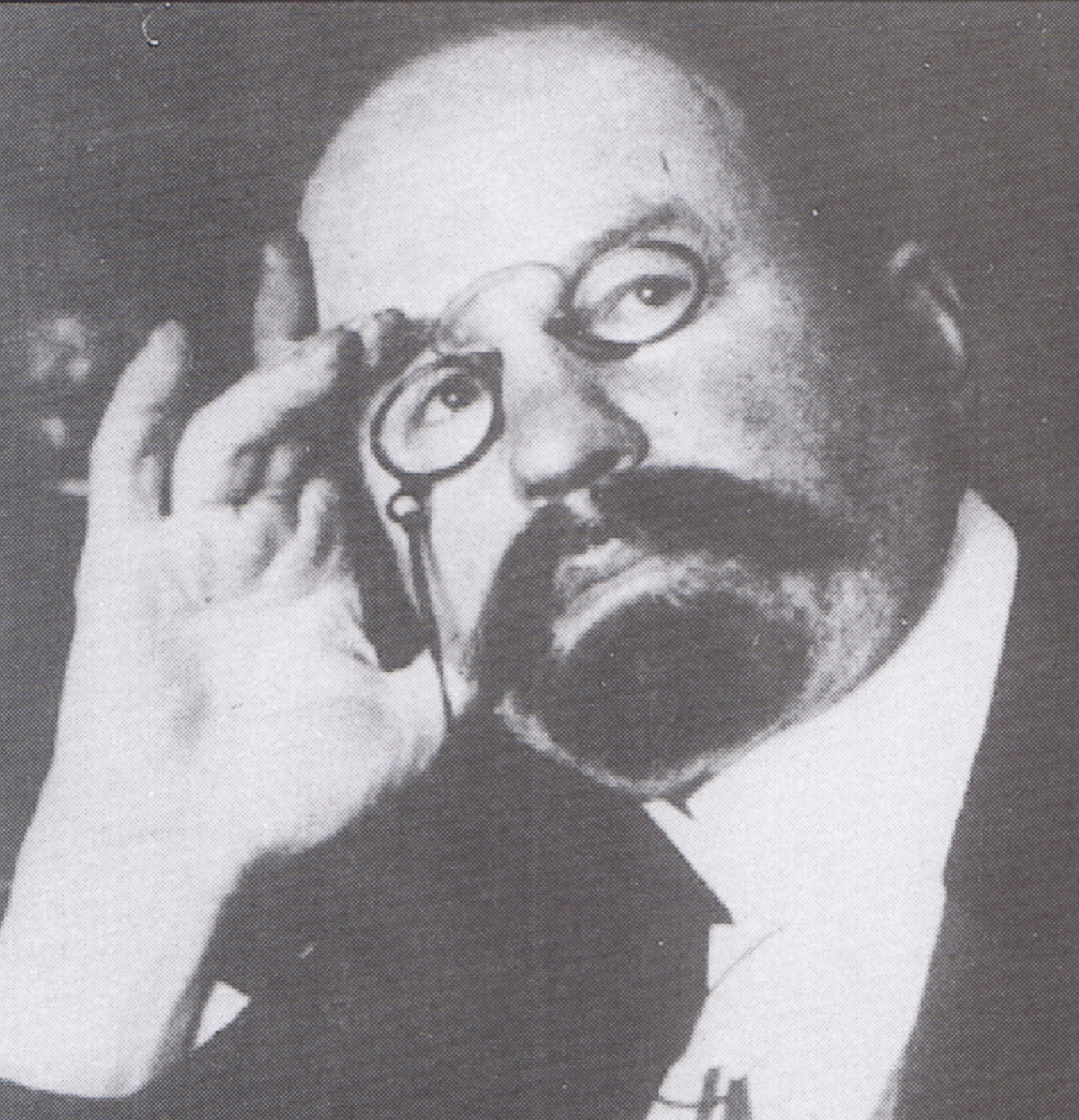
Alexander von Bischoffshausen

Alexander von Bischoffshausen (26 October 1846 in Hanau - 18 June 1928 in Brannenburg) was the director of the Reichsschuldenverwaltung (Reich Debt Commission) from 1907 to 1918.
