= Ontario power plant scandal =

Canadian provincial political scandal

The Ontario power plant scandal (also called the gas plants scandal) relates to the decisions by the Liberal government to cancel the construction of two natural gas power plants: one in Mississauga and another in Oakville. Members of the Progressive Conservative Party of Ontario (PC) as well as the Ontario New Democratic Party (NDP) also voted to cancel the power plant. The Mississauga cancellation was made as a late campaign promise in the 2011 general election. From immediately following the election until March 18, 2013, the Liberal government stated that the cost of the cancellations was $230 million — $190 million for the Mississauga plant and $40 million for the Oakville plant. A final report by the Auditor General of Ontario that was released on October 8, 2013, found the total cost of the cancellations was $950 million ($275 million for the Mississauga plant and $675 million for the Oakville plant). This cost included estimates of future costs to the ratepayers.

The scandal contributed to the resignation of Premier Dalton McGuinty and Energy Minister Chris Bentley.

== Tendering and bidders ==
In April 2005, the McGuinty Government closed the coal-fired Lakeview Generating Station in the Greater Toronto Area (GTA). This closure created a need to establish new power plants to support the electricity needs of the GTA.

In 2007, the Ontario Power Authority's (OPA) Integrated Power System Plan report recommended new natural gas-fired electric power generation plants (gas plants) be constructed. In August 2008, the Minister of Energy and Infrastructure directed the OPA to competitively procure a combined-cycle gas generation facility in the southwest Greater Toronto Areas with a capacity of up to 850 megawatts (MWs). These plants were to be in operation no later than December 31, 2013. Under this procurement, the contractors would continue to own and operate the asset, not just build it as had been typical in the past.

In the May 2009 information to bidders, the OPA stated that the constructors' proposals would need to consider municipal requirements for their proposed sites that were in effect on January 16, 2009. The constructors were responsible for obtaining local permits, not the government. In September 2009, the OPA announced it had accepted a bid by TransCanada Energy (TCE) to build a 900-megawatt natural gas-fired power generation facility in southeast Oakville.

== Local opposition ==
On December 11, 2009, the fast-growing Citizens for Clean Air coalition in Oakville stepped up opposition to the project with the campaign slogan: 'It just doesn't make sense.' By June 2010, TCE had missed the contract's milestone dates for obtaining pre-construction approvals and permits from the Town of Oakville.

On October 1, 2010, local opponents rallied at the Ontario legislature and brought in American environmentalist Erin Brockovich to help generate publicity for their fight with the government. Liberal MPP for Oakville Kevin Flynn battled his own government's plan for the gas plant. On October 7, 2010, Liberal energy minister Brad Duguid announced the cancellation of the Oakville gas plant. Ceding to increasing opposition, Duguid proposed to feed the GTA's power demand by improving transmission lines.

In the 2011 Provincial election, the Mississauga candidates of all three parties openly expressed opposition to the Mississauga power plant in pre-election debates. NDP candidate Anju Sikka wrote in an open letter to Dalton McGuinty "An NDP government would never allow construction to begin before a thorough and independent Environmental Assessment has been completed", and PC candidate Geoff Janoscik stated in a press release "A Tim Hudak Government will cancel this plant".

== Oakville cancellation ==
On October 9, 2009, the OPA and TCE signed a contract for the Oakville plant. Amid local protest and opposition from the Town of Oakville, in June 2010 TCE missed the milestone date under the contract for obtaining all pre-construction approvals and permits for the Oakville plant from the Town of Oakville.

On October 7, 2010, the Government announced the cancellation of the Oakville plant. The Ministry communique stated that TCE was entitled to reasonable damages and the anticipated financial value of the original contract. On the same day the Minister sent a letter to the OPA advising them of his directive. This commitment to make TCE "whole" became central to the massive cost escalation of the project. Minister Kathleen Wynne, later Premier, signed the Cabinet directive.

== Mississauga cancellation ==
On September 28, 2011, a week prior to a general election, the Ontario Liberal Party's campaign announced that if elected, the government would cancel the Mississauga gas plant. Editorials questioned the role politics should play in controlling electricity policy.

== The election ==
On October 6, 2011, the Liberals won the most seats in the new legislature but not a majority. The lack of a majority would allow opposition parties to use legislative committees to probe the gas plants scandal. On October 7, 2011, the Minister of Energy announced the Mississauga project had been canceled by the Cabinet.

== Oakville negotiation ==
The OPA directed to negotiate a settlement with TCE. However, the Premier's direction to guarantee the full financial value of the contract would greatly increase the cost of cancellation. The contract's force majeure clause allowed for the cancellation of the contract without costs if the project lagged by more than 24 months due to a failure to obtain municipal permits. TCE had already missed key dates and the Town of Oakville was threatening to fight the project to the Supreme Court of Canada if necessary. These delays might have allowed the government to exit the contract without penalty. Alternatively, another contract clause limited the government's liability to costs paid in the event that the government unilaterally terminated the contract. However, enforcement of the contract was not pursued.

Negotiations took place on the Premier's Office's terms—a commitment to make TCE "whole." An initial proposal was developed by TCE to build a replacement power plant in the Kitchener-Waterloo or Cambridge area. A memorandum of understanding on the project was signed. However, the MOU expired in June 2011 with no plan adopted.

On August 5, 2011, TCE and the government met to arbitrate the settlement. According to the Auditor-General's report "as with the Premier’s Office’s commitment to TCE the year before, the [arbitration] framework waived the clause in the Oakville plant contract that gave the OPA a defensible claim of not owing TCE lost profits (that is, the clause stating that only if the Government took discriminatory action through legislation or similar means would the OPA be liable for damages such as loss of profits, with the OPA’s cancellation of the plant not meeting the definition of discriminatory). In March 2012 OPA offered a $462 million settlement to TCE, which was rejected. In April 2012, under Cabinet direction, the OPA offered a settlement of $712 million, which was also rejected. Energy Minister Chris Bentley announced an agreement was reached on August 24, 2012, but still maintained the cost of the cancellation would be $40 million. On Oct 15, 2012, Premier Dalton McGuinty announced he would resign after the selection of a new leader by the Liberal Party. On the same day, he prorogued the legislature, shutting down the investigative committees.

Later in October 2012, Premier McGuinty rejected a media report citing research by energy consultant Tom Adams estimating the cancellation costs of the Mississauga and Oakville plants at $1.3 billion. Premier McGuinty continued to claim the cost of canceling the Oakville plant would be $40 million and the Mississauga plant cancellation would cost $190 million -- for a total of $230 million.

The Ontario Liberal party elected MPP Kathleen Wynne as its leader on January 26, 2013. On February 7, 2013, Premier McGuinty requested the Auditor-General review of the costs associated with the cancellation of the Oakville gas plant. Wynne became Premier on Feb 11, 2013.

On March 18, 2013, the Minister of Energy for the first time stated that the $40 million estimate of the cost of canceling the Oakville plant "could be wrong."

== Final accounting of costs ==
On October 8, 2013, the Auditor-General Bonnie Lysyk reported the cost to cancel the Oakville plant at $675 million. The Auditor-General noted that had the premier's office not become involved, the OPA may have been in a position to simply wait and then exercise an option to break the contract without penalty: "We believe that the settlement with TCE will not only keep TCE whole but may make it better than whole," Lysyk said. The report estimated the Premier's Office directive to make TCE "whole" increased the payout to TCE by $225 million over what was due under the terms of the contract.

A substantial portion of the net $675 million cost of canceling the Oakville plant and replacing it with the Napanee plant relates to the decision to locate the replacement plant farther from the location of power consumption in the GTA and farther from natural gas supplies. The Auditor General calculated increased gas supply costs and additional line transmission losses totaling of $609 million (included in the $675 million total), which are wholly or partially off-set by a savings of $275 million through a lower negotiated price for the Napanee plant.

== Opposition contempt charge ==
As the questions arose concerning the accuracy of the Liberals' claim that the two gas plant cancellations only cost $230 million, opposition members of the Legislative committee asked new Energy minister Chris Bentley to hand over all documents related to the gas plant cancellations.

On May 16, 2012, the Estimates Committee of the Ontario Legislature adopted a motion directing the former Minister of Energy, the Ministry of Energy, and the OPA to produce "all correspondence, in any form, electronic or otherwise, that occurred between September 1, 2010, and December 31, 2011, related to the cancellation of the Oakville power plant as well all correspondence, in any form, electronic or otherwise, that occurred between August 1, 2011, and December 31, 2011, related to the cancellation of the Mississauga power plant."

On May 30, 2012, the former Minister of Energy declined to disclose the records requested by the Estimates Committee, citing “the confidential, privileged and highly commercially sensitive nature of the issues.”

On July 13, 2012, 500 pages of emails, letters, and PowerPoint presentations were released to the Estimates Committee. Members of the opposition were not satisfied with the 500 pages of documents that were produced

On August 27, 2012, a member of the Estimates Committee sought a ruling from the Speaker on whether privilege had been breached by the failure of the former Minister to provide the documents ordered.

On September 12, 2012, Energy Minister Chris Bentley stated he would comply with the Speaker's order to provide gas plants documents but asked for six weeks more time so as to not jeopardize negotiations with TCE. However, an agreement had been made with TCE on August 24, 2012.

On September 13, 2012, the Speaker found in favor of members of the opposition that there was a prima facie case for contempt by the former Minister and, through the issuance of a Speaker's ruling, ordered the former Minister to comply with the Estimates Committee motion.

On September 21, 2012, Don Guy, the Manager of the Liberals' 2011 campaign, emailed the Premier's Office staffer Laura Miller and the brother of the Premier saying the Speaker needs to "change his mind" on his ruling. Miller emailed back to Guy stating Premier's Office staffer Dave Gene "is putting the member from Brant [ie: Levac] on notice we need better here."

On September 24, 2012, the Liberals release 36,000 documents. On September 25, 2012, the Progressive Conservatives introduce a motion of contempt to the legislature. On October 12, 2012, an additional 20,000 previously undisclosed documents were released by the Liberals. However, not a single document originated from any of the political staff in the office of the Minister of Energy.

== Prorogation and Premier McGuinty's resignation ==
On October 1, 2012, Government House Leader Office (GHLO) staffer David Phillips emailed the Premier's Chief of Staff (Livingston) and Deputy Chief of Staff (Miller) with his "very rough views/pitch on prorogation." The email noted the various scandals enveloping the Liberals and being pursued by various legislative committee meetings. "If we prorogue... these will not take place for the next five months."

On October 15, 2012, Dalton McGuinty prorogued the legislature and announced his resignation pending a leadership convention.

On October 20, 2012, Liberal government staffers used a media source to present the false-flag story that McGuinty may be quitting to pursue the leadership of the federal Liberal party. Don Guy added that a polling firm included the false McGuinty federal candidacy in a poll to be reported in the media.

== New contempt charges ==
On Thursday, March 7, 2013, the Standing Committee on Justice Policy began their review of the contempt charge against Chris Bentley as well as "observations and recommendations concerning the tendering, planning, commissioning, cancellation, and relocation of the Mississauga and Oakville gas plants". Conservative committee members called the Honourable Peter Milliken PC, former federal Speaker of the House of Commons, as a witness. Milliken stated "This [contempt charge] didn't meet the standards for a contempt motion. I found the (Tories') request at the time reckless,".

== Cover-up discovered ==
Although 56,500 documents had been tabled from the Ministry of Energy and the OPA to comply with the May 16, 2012 motion of the Estimates Committee of the Legislature, none of the documents came from the political staff in the Minister's Office. The Justice Committee asked the former Chief of Staff Craig MacLennan to give testimony.

At a meeting of Justice Policy Committee of the Legislature on April 9, 2013, NDP MPP Peter Tabuns asked the former Chief of Staff to the Minister of Energy why the political staffer had provided no documents. MacLennan replied: "I didn’t have any responsive documents. I regret that I didn’t have any responsive documents. My colleague coordinated the search in the office. All I can speak to is what my work habit is, which is to keep a clean inbox. I always have worked that way."

On April 12, 2013, NDP MPP Peter Tabuns lodged a complaint with the Ontario Privacy Commissioner asking her to investigate "what appears to be a breach of protocol and a violation of the Archives and Recordkeeping Act and the Freedom of Information and Protection of Privacy Act."

The Privacy Commissioner's report was tabled on June 5, 2013. In the report, the Commissioner stated "While I cannot state with certainty that emails had been deleted improperly by the former Premier’s staff during the transition to the new Premier in an effort to avoid transparency and accountability, it strains credulity that no one knew that the practice of deleting all emails was not in compliance with applicable records management and retention policies.". The report found "the practice of indiscriminate deletion of all emails sent and received by the former Chief of Staff was in violation of the Archives and Recordkeeping Act, 2006 (ARA) and the retention of the record schedule developed by Archives of Ontario for ministers’ offices. In my view, this practice also undermined the purposes of the Freedom of Information and Protection of Privacy Act F(FIPPA), and the transparency and accountability principles that form the foundation of both Acts. It truly strains credulity to think that absolutely no records responsive to the Estimates Committee motion and the Speaker's ruling were retained."

The Privacy Commission met with information technology staff at the Ministry of Government Services (MGS) to inquire about the possibility of retrieving the deleted emails from MGS's central server. According to Cavourkian's report "MGS IT staff described the difficulty and complexity of reconstructing data from a search in the email RAID server into a useable file. Specifically, MGS IT staff stated that while searching for a deleted email from yesterday would require a great deal of effort, searching for data from two or three months ago would be “fruitless, as the data no longer exists.” MGS IT staff further stated that reconstructing the data from a search in the RAID server into a usable file would be “tantamount to reconstructing a single shredded document from a bin of shredded documents.” The commission also found there was "a culture of avoiding the creation of written documentation on the gas plants issue."

While probing the appropriateness of the staff of the Minister of Energy, the Commissioner was told Premier McGuinty's Chief of Staff, David Livingston, had asked the Cabinet Secretary about ways to permanently delete emails from computers in the Premier's Office. This fact was included in her June 5, 2013 report and led to the launch of an OPP investigation into the Livingston and the Premier's Office two days later.

On August 20, 2013, Privacy Commissioner Ann Cavoukian said the Wynne government had provided "inaccurate and incomplete information in my initial investigation" about the ability to retrieve deleted emails. "As a direct consequence of the incomplete response, the public has been misled…about the ability of staff to retrieve potentially relevant information.”

On March 27, 2014, a court document became public in which the OPP stated they had probable cause to lay criminal charges against David Livingston, McGuinty's last chief of staff. The document alleged Livingston hired an IT contractor to the Liberal Party, Peter Faist (who was also the common-law partner of the Premier's Office staffer Laura Miller), to wipe clean the hard drives of computers in the Premier's Office that contained information about the gas plant scandal. Police say the hard drives will “afford evidence” of a breach of trust. Mr. Faist and Ms. Miller had since moved to British Columbia where Ms. Miller became the executive director of the BC Liberal Party. They were scheduled to give evidence to the Justice Policy Committee of the Legislature when an election was called, suspending the activity of the committee.

== Criminal trial and conviction ==
On December 17, 2015, the Ontario Provincial Police announced three criminal charges each against David Livingston and Laura Miller: breach of trust, mischief in relation to data, and misuse of a computer system to commit mischief. Both entered pleas of not guilty as to all counts. The trial was heard by the Ontario Court of Justice at Old City Hall in Toronto and commenced in September 2017.

At the close of its prosecution on November 3, 2017, the Crown advised that it would not pursue convictions on the breach of trust charges, seeing no reasonable prospect of conviction. The defense subsequently advised that it would not call any witnesses, and applied for a directed verdict of acquittal as to the remaining counts. Justice Timothy R. Lipson ruled against acquittal as to misuse of a computer system to commit mischief, but downgraded the other counts to attempt to commit mischief to data, ruling that: "...it would be speculative to conclude that data relevant to the prosecution case was destroyed. To draw an inference that the deleted files did, in fact, contain business or work-related material would, at best, amount to an educated guess and that is impermissible."

Following closing arguments, the Court handed down verdicts on January 19, 2018. David Livingston was found guilty of the remaining counts, mischief in relation to data, and attempted misuse of a computer system to commit mischief. The ruling stated that "Mr. Livingston's plan to eliminate sensitive and confidential work-related data, in my view, amounted to a 'scorched earth strategy, where information that could be potentially useful to adversaries, both within and outside of the Liberal Party, would be destroyed."

Laura Miller was found not guilty on both counts. The Court found that there was evidence suggesting that Ms. Miller was a party to the offenses, having been deeply involved in the government's communication strategy with respect to the power plant controversy, and having assisted David Livingston in selecting hard drives to be wiped. However, the Court held that there was reasonable doubt as to her guilt. The Canadian Press reported that Miller's acquittal "drew an audible gasp" in the packed courtroom.

In response to the verdicts, Premier Wynne's office issued a statement: "We've been clear from the start that this is not how anyone in government should operate, and it is not how a premier's office should operate... Upon coming into office, we introduced a number of significant measures to strengthen the document retention protocol and ensure that all staff are aware of their responsibilities." The (then) Opposition leader MPP Patrick Brown stated that "[t]he guilty verdict is an indictment of the 15 years of Liberal political corruption that has long been rooted in the premier's office."

David Livingston was sentenced on April 11, 2018, to four months in jail, one year of probation, and 100 hours of community service. During sentencing, Justice Timothy Lipson stated that Livingston “abused his position of power to promote the interests of the governing party at the expense of the democratic process.” Livingston served a reduced sentence of 35 days in jail between July 29 and September 2, 2018.
