= Oskar Georg Fischbach =

German lawyer and civil servant

- Born: 14 December 1880; Strasbourg, then in Germany
- Died: 1967 (aged 86–87); Munich, West Germany
- Occupation: Lawyer
- Known for: Civil service law

Oskar Georg Fischbach (14 December 1880 – 1967) was a German lawyer and civil servant who was involved in drafting the civil service law at the end of the Weimar Republic and various official laws of Nazi Germany.

== Life ==
Oskar Georg Fischbach was born in Strasbourg, then in Germany, on 14 December 1880. He gained a doctorate of Law in Strasbourg in 1907. In 1915 he was appointed to the District Court of Strasbourg. Fischbach became a civil servant in the Reich Treasury, then in the Reich Ministry of Finance. He became a member of the Nazi Party in May 1933, and was a member of the subcommittee on Civil Service Law of Hans Frank's Academy for German Law. He worked on drafts of the Nazi laws, including the German Civil Service act of 1937. In 1945 he was appointed the last president of the National Debt Office, succeeding Ernst Articus.

After World War II (1939–45) the arbitration board of the Greater Berlin Magistrature rejected his denazification. However, the American military government allowed his denazification as a so-called follower. He became an author, and during the early years of the German Federal Republic commented on the new Federal Civil Service Act. He died in 1967.

== Publications ==
- Fischbach, Oskar Georg (1914). Das öffentliche Recht des Reichslandes Elsaß-Lothringen (The public law of Reichsland Alsace-Lorraine) (in German).
- Fischbach, Oskar Georg (1923). Allgemeines Staatsrecht (General Constitutional Law) (in German). Vol. I and II.
- Fischbach, Oskar Georg (1928). Allgemeine Staatslehre (General Political Law) (in German).
  - Fischbach, Oskar Georg (1928). Derecho político general y constitucional comparado (General political and constitutional law compared) (in Spanish). Translated by Roces, Wenceslao. Barcelona: Labor. p. 380.
- Fischbach, Oskar Georg (1930). Reichsbeamtengesetz (Reich Civil Service Act) (in German).
- Fischbach, Oskar Georg (1933). Reichsgesetz zur Wiederherstellung des Berufsbeamtentums (Reich Law for the Restoration of the Professional Civil Service) (in German).
- Fischbach, Oskar Georg (1933). Reichsgesetz zur Änderung von Vorschriften auf dem Gebiete des allgemeinen Beamten-, des Besoldungs- und des Versorgungsrechts (Reich law amending legislation in the field of general civil service, pay and pension law) (in German).
- Fischbach, Oskar Georg (1940). Deutsches Beamtengesetz (German Law on Civil Servants) (in German). Vol. I and II. (Addendum 1942).
- Fischbach, Oskar Georg (1951). Deutsches Beamtengesetz und Bundespersonalgesetz (German Law on Civil Servants and Public Officials Act) (in German).
- Fischbach, Oskar Georg (1954). Das Landesbeamtengesetz von Berlin (State Civil Service Law of Berlin) (in German). Berlin.
- Fischbach, Oskar Georg (1960). Recht und Juristen in Münchens Vergangenheit : Ein Spaziergang durch Münchens Strassen. (Law and lawyers in Munich's past: A walk through the streets of Munich) (in German). Munich: Heymann. p. 96.
- Fischbach, Oskar Georg (1964). Bundesbeamtengesetz (Federal Civil Service Act) (in German). Vol. I and II.

== Sources ==
- "Fischbach, Oskar Georg" (in German). Bundesarchiv.
- Hellmuth, Günther (2012). "Oskar Georg Fischbach – Staatsdiener und Beamtenrechtler". Zeitschrift für neuere Rechtsgeschichte (in German) (34): 69–98.
- "Präsidenten der Schuldenverwaltung". Bundesrepublik Deutschland ‒ Finanzagentur GmbH.
