= German Finance Agency =

Central service provider for Germany's borrowing and debt management

Bundesrepublik Deutschland - Finanzagentur Gesellschaft mit beschränkter Haftung
- Type: Gesellschaft mit beschränkter Haftung
- Founded: 29 August 1990
- Headquarters: Frankfurt am Main, Germany
- Key people: Members of Executive Board: Tammo Diemer; Eva Grunwald
- Products: general term: government bonds; in particular: Federal bonds, Federal notes, Federal Treasury notes, Treasury discount paper, inflation-linked Federal securities, green Federal bonds, green federal notes for financing the Federal budget and debt at capital and money market
- Revenue: ▲€42,512,024 (2023)
- Net income: ▲€924,953 (2023)
- Number of employees: 283 (2023)
- Website: www.deutsche-finanzagentur.de

The Federal Republic of Germany – Finance Agency (German: Bundesrepublik Deutschland – Finanzagentur GmbH) is the central service provider for the Federal Republic of Germany's borrowing and debt management. Thus it is wholly owned by the Federal Republic of Germany, represented by the Federal Ministry of Finance. Legal basis is the Federal Government Debt Management Act (Bundesschuldenwesengesetz) that constitutes a special public control and supervision by the Federal Ministry of Finance which in addition itself regularly reports on debt management issues to budget experts from the German Bundestag.

== History ==
The company was formed by the Federal Republic of Germany on 19 September 2000, by amendment to the statutes of 29 August 1990, from the Berlin-based CVU Systemhaus Abwicklungsgesellschaft mbH and is headquartered in Frankfurt am Main.

Since 2001, the Finance Agency organizes the borrowing of the Federal Republic of Germany and performs its debt management. It operates in the international financial markets solely and exclusively in the name of and for the account of the Federal Republic of Germany.

On 1 August 2006 it was merged with the former Federal Securities Administration (formerly Federal Debt Administration). Since then, the Federal Finance Agency has also offered private investors free bookkeeping for Federal securities in the form of a book entry account and its toll-free acquisition, similar to the U.S. TreasuryDirect program. From July 1, 2008, the Finance Agency distributed the new developed Federal day bond (Tagesanleihe) for private investors.

Because of the shrinking demand from retail customers, resulting in a decreasing share and importance of the retail client business for the Federal funding since the mid-nineties, in 2012 the German Ministry of Finance decided not to continue the retail client business as it became uneconomic. So 2013, the Finance Agency stopped issuing Government securities for retail investors – especially the Federal savings notes, the Federal Treasury financing papers and the Federal day bond. Today the remaining exchange-listed German Government bonds and bills can only be bought through banks.

Beside the traditional Government securities like Federal bonds, Federal notes, Federal Treasury notes and Treasury discount paper the Finance Agency also issued some new funding instruments. After two US-Dollar bonds in 2005 and 2009 the first inflation-linked bond followed in 2006 until this programme was discontinued end of 2023. In 2013 the Bund-Länder-Anleihe was issued: the first and only joint issue of the Federal Republic of Germany together with 10 German states. In 2020, Finance Agency issued the first green Federal bond with a multi-billion euro size and with the same maturity and coupon as conventional securities. Under the so-called twin bond concept, a steadily increasing volume has been issued each year until 2024, matched by green expenditures in the federal budget. By the end of 2024, eight green Federal securities with a volume of over 70 bn euros are in circulation.

Between 2010 and 2013 the Finance Agency performed several services for the European Financial Stability Facility (EFSF). Since the beginning of 2018, the finance agency has been entrusted with the sponsorship of the Federal Financial Market Stabilization Agency (FMSA). At the same time, the Finance Agency took over the management/processing of the Financial Market Stabilization Fund (FMS or special fund financial market stabilization, SoFFin) from the FMSA, including the associated investments. In 2020, the German Federal Government set up the Economic Stabilisation Fund (ESF) to mitigate the negative effects of the coronavirus pandemic on the German economy, placing it under the umbrella of the Finance Agency. Later, between November 2022 and the end of 2023, it also served to finance measures to mitigate the consequences of the energy crisis.

== Operations & management ==
The company carries out tasks in budget funding and short-term liquidity funding of the Federal government, which were previously performed by the Federal Ministry of Finance, the Bundesbank and the Federal Securities Administration. These activities include services in connection with the issuance of Federal securities, the use of derivative financial instruments to manage the debt portfolio and money market operations to offset the account of the Federal Republic of Germany at the Bundesbank at the end of each day. The legal basis and the credit line is given by the yearly Budget Act.

Additional services for the Federal Ministry of Finance, as representative of the Federal Republic of Germany, are market analyses, the development of models for portfolio management, risk monitoring, risk management and investor, press and public relations for Federal securities.

The first and foremost priority of the Finance Agency is to guarantee the liquidity and solvency of the Federal Government at all times. Furthermore, it aims to maintain and expand the Federal government's benchmark position as sovereign bond issuer in the euro area. The aim of debt management is to keep the interest costs of the debt portfolio as low as possible in the mid-term and thereby limiting the interest rate risks of its debt portfolio.
