= BTAN =

A BTAN or Bon à Taux Annuel Normalisé (Pl.: Bons à Taux Annuel Normalisés) was a coupon-bearing French government bond with a two to five year maturity. The last of these matured on 25 July 2017.
