= Canada Savings Bond =

Investment

The Canada Savings Bond (French: Obligations d’épargne du Canada) was an investment instrument offered by the Government of Canada from 1945 to 2017, sold between early October and December 1 of every year. It was issued by the Bank of Canada and was intended to offer a competitive interest rate, and had a guaranteed minimum interest rate.

== History ==
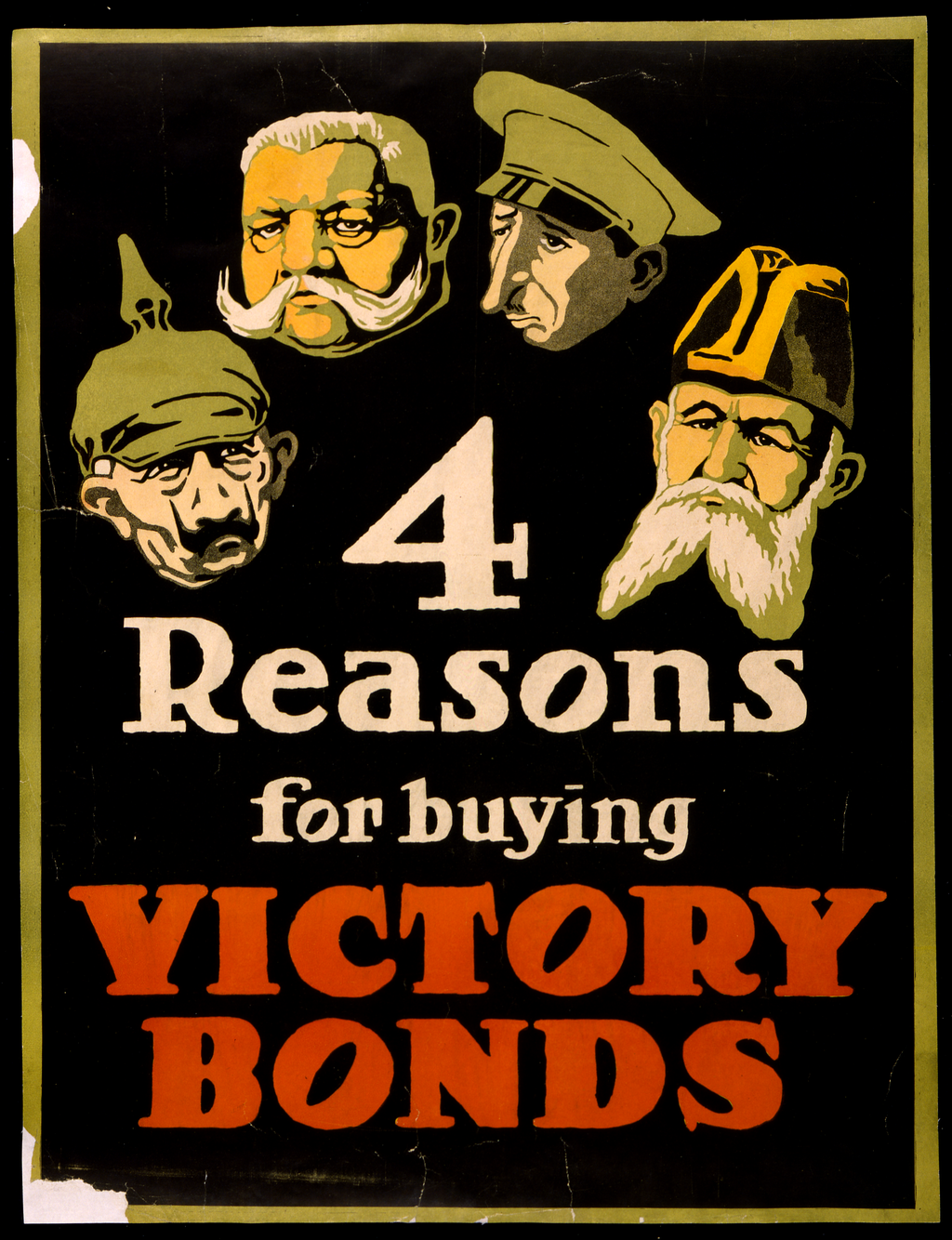
"4 Reasons for Buying Victory Bonds" by unknown, Canadian Government created, 1917. The Central Powers leaders, shown left to right are: William II of Germany, Paul von Hindenburg, Crown Prince Wilhelm, and Alfred von Tirpitz.

Canada started selling war bonds (marketed as "Victory Bonds") in 1917 to raise money during World War I for the Allies of World War I. Five bond campaigns were held from 1915 to 1919. To advertise the purchasing of Victory Bonds, the Victory Loan Dominion Publicity Committee created artwork, held parades, and had celebrity endorsements. Community members who bought many Victory Bonds were given a Victory Loan Honour Flag as a token of gratitude. The program was revived for World War II.

Canada Savings Bonds were first offered in 1945 in order to replicate the success of Victory Bonds.

In 2004, consultants gave the Department of Finance a report suggesting the CSB program be scrapped, giving an overall program cost savings of about $650 million in nine years. Then-finance minister Ralph Goodale rejected the recommendation as the program remained popular, especially with first-time investors, and opted to have the program changed to be more competitive and attract investors.

The value of bonds issued declined from $55 billion in 1987 to just over $6 billion in 2015.

A government-commissioned study by KPMG in June 2015 recommended cancelling the program. Despite this recommendation, the Department of Finance ruled out cancellation despite the program's estimated $58 million annual cost.

As of October 2016, the Liberal government considered ending the program. On March 22, 2017, the federal budget announced its decision to end the sale of new CSBs, saying they would be discontinued in 2017. No further bond purchases will be allowed, however existing bonds will still be honoured until they are redeemed.

== Types of bonds ==
Canada Savings Bonds were available in regular interest, which paid the interest directly to the bond holder, and compounding interest, which added to interest to the principal for the purpose of future interest calculations, only paying when the bond was redeemed. The interest rate was guaranteed for 1 year and could fluctuate with market conditions for the remaining 9 years until its maturity. These bonds were redeemable at any time.

Canada Premium Bonds were also a available in regular and compounding interest. These bonds, introduced in 1997, differ from the regular savings bonds in that they were sold with a higher interest rate fixed through the third year; the interest rate would fluctuate for the remaining 7 years with market conditions until its maturity. This greater interest rate stability was considered a premium feature. Conversely, they were only redeemable on the anniversary of the issue date or during the 30 days thereafter.

Canada Investment Bonds were non-redeemable until maturity, but were shorter-term bonds with a three-year maturity. They were available only through investment brokers. They were offered from October 1, 2003, and April 1, 2004; only 6 series were issued before their discontinuation.

== See also ==
- Épargne Placements Québec
- Ontario Savings Bond
- Saskatchewan Savings Bond
