= Épargne Placements Québec =

Agency overview
- Formed: 1996
- Headquarters: 800, place d'Youville; 20e étage Quebec City, Quebec; G1R 5W3
- Motto: "Your Savings Guaranteed 100%"
- Minister responsible: Éric Girard, Minister of Finance
- Website: www.epq.gouv.qc.ca/en

Épargne Placements Québec is an administrative unit of the Quebec Ministry of Finance. It is responsible for marketing and managing savings and retirement products issued and guaranteed by the Quebec government.

The function of Épargne Placements Québec is to foster the financial security of Quebecers by offering them a range of savings and retirement products guaranteed by the Quebec government.

== History ==
In the spring of 1996, Placements Québec was established by the Quebec government to achieve its funding objectives on the Quebec savings market and to offer a range of savings products better adapted to Quebecers' investment needs.

Since 1963, the Quebec government had offered Quebec Savings Bonds. Before the creation of Placements Québec, the holder was issued a physical certificate as evidence that he held the purchased product. To redeem his bond, the holder had to present the certificate they had received at the time of purchase.

With the creation of Placements Québec, the offering of savings and retirement products issued by the Quebec government was diversified to reflect Quebecers' savings need. In addition, with this new entity, physical certificates were replaced with the registration of savings products in a book-based system, i.e. the registration of a security in the holder's account. This approach facilitates transactions for bondholders and eliminates the risk of loss, theft and destruction of physical certificates.

In January 2003, Placements Québec became Épargne Placements Québec to better convey the mission of the organization.
