= Saskatchewan Savings Bond =

Bond securities issues previously offered by the province of Saskatchewan

Saskatchewan Savings Bonds (SSB) were bond securities issued by the Canadian province of Saskatchewan. As of June 2010, the product is no longer offered. SSBs' principal and interest are backed by the Province of Saskatchewan. The SSBs were available from financial institutions, credit unions, and investment dealers. On July 15, 2007, the Government issued $183.7 million 5 year, 4.2 per cent Series 16 Saskatchewan Savings Bonds and redeemed $187.8 million of previous series savings bonds, for a net reduction in savings bonds outstanding of $4.1 million. The minimum purchase value was $100 and the maximum value was $200,000. As of April 2009, there were $247.2 million in SSBs outstanding.

Unlike the Canada Savings Bond, SSBs were only sold to residents of Saskatchewan.
