= BTF (finance) =

BTFs (Bons du Trésor à taux fixe et à intérêts précomptés) are fixed-rate short-term discount Treasury bills issued by the French debt agency Agence France Trésor (AFT).

They are fungible securities whose original maturity is less than or equal to one year. BTFs are issued on a weekly basis by auction, according to a quarterly calendar published in advance specifying the maturity of bills to be auctioned. A 3-month BTF is issued each week, together with a semi-annual or annual BTF.
