= Ontario Savings Bond =

Canadian provincial savings bond

Ontario Savings Bonds (OSBs; French: Obligations d’épargne de l’Ontario) were bond securities offered by the province of Ontario from 1995 to 2018. Unlike the Canada Savings Bond, OSBs were sold only to residents of Ontario, and their principal and interest were backed by the Province of Ontario. The OSBs were available from financial institutions, credit unions, and investment dealers.

The Government of Ontario discontinued the sale of future Ontario savings bonds after 2018. All current bonds will continue to be honoured.

== Types of bonds ==
There were three types of savings bonds offered by the province. The variable-rate bond was a three-year bond that had its interest rate reset every six months (prior to 2009) or every year (since 2009). The step-up bond was a five-year bond that had an interest rate that increased every year until maturity. Finally, there were three different terms of fixed-rate bond, a 3-year, 7-year, and 10-year, each with interest rates that were unchanging throughout their term. While the fixed-rate bond could only be redeemed at maturity, step-up bonds could be redeemed semiannually on June 21 or December 21 (and 14 days thereafter), and variable rate bonds purchased 2009 and later could only be redeemed June 21 annually and 14 days thereafter.
