= Government bond =

Bond issued by a government

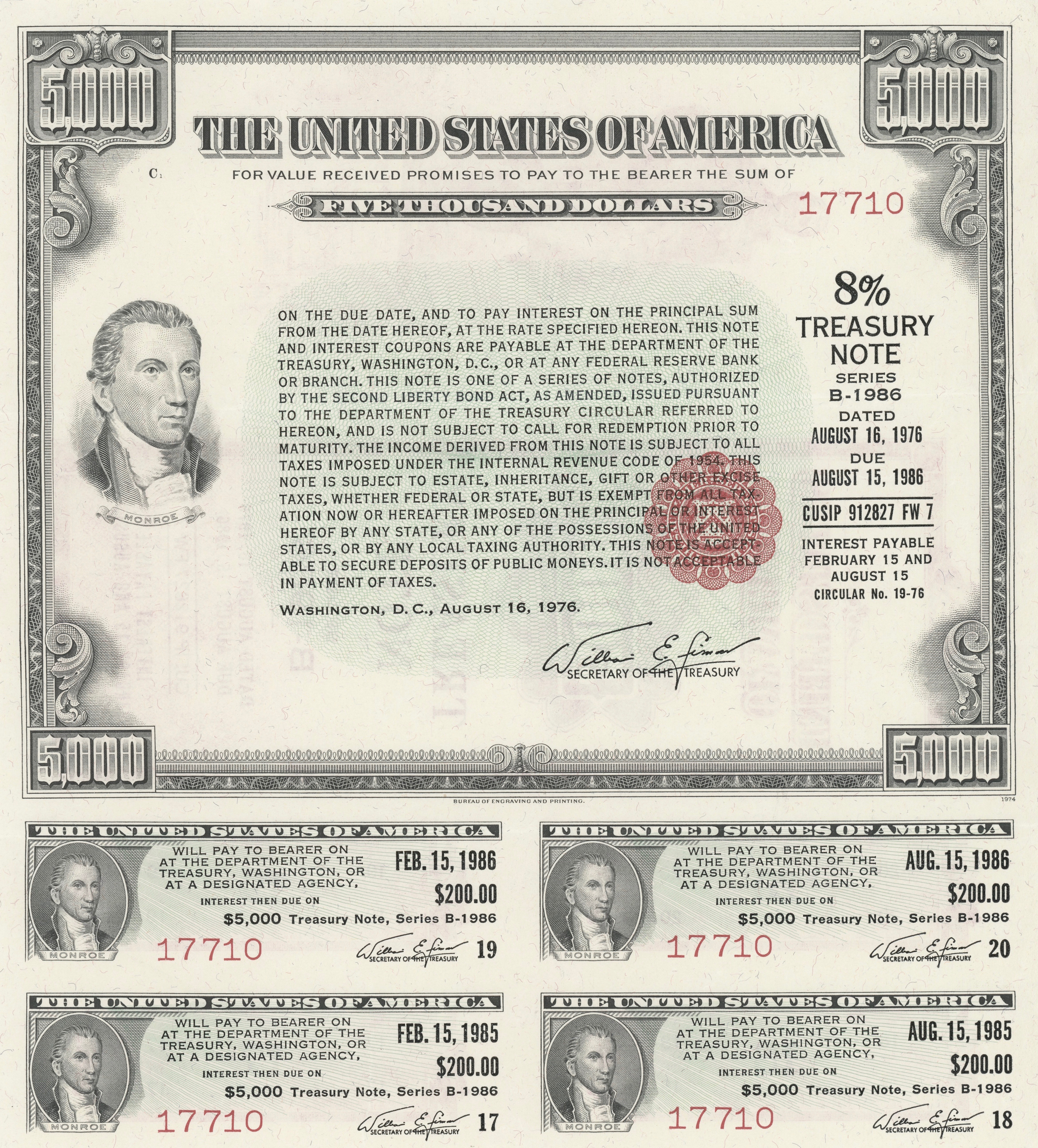
U.S. government bond: 1976 8% Treasury Note

A government bond or sovereign bond is a form of bond issued by a government to support public spending. It generally includes a commitment to pay periodic interest, called coupon payments, and to repay the face value on the maturity date. The ratio of the annual interest payment to the current market price of the bond is called the current yield. The yield tends to decrease when the government budget balance improves.

For example, a bondholder invests $20,000, called face value or principal, into a ten-year government bond with a 10% annual coupon; the government would pay the bondholder 10% interest ($2000 in this case) each year and repay the $20,000 original face value at the date of maturity (i.e. after ten years).

Government bonds can be denominated in a foreign currency or the government's domestic currency. Countries with less stable economies tend to denominate their bonds in the currency of a country with a more stable economy (i.e. a hard currency). International credit rating agencies provide ratings for each country's bonds. Bondholders generally demand higher yields from riskier bonds; for example, during the Greek government-debt crisis, the spread (difference) in yields between two and ten-year Greek and German government bonds peaked at 260% and 40%, respectively. Governments close to a default are sometimes referred to as being in a sovereign debt crisis.

== History ==
One of the first assets resembling government bonds were the forced loans, or prestiti, that the Republic of Venice first issued in 1172 to fund wars and defence spending. These paid a nominal interest rate of 5% per year on the face value, in two half-yearly instalments, and could be sold in the open market for a lump sum.

In 1694, William III of England used a syndicate of 1268 investors to purchase debt to fund the Nine Years' War. This syndicate was granted a Royal charter, becoming the Bank of England. Much of the initial debt issuance by the English government took an unconventional form by current standards, including annuities and lotteries as parts of their design, but alongside these were a number of perpetual bonds offering different coupon rates, and by 1752 these perpetual bonds were consolidated (consols) in a smaller number of distinct stocks offering fixed coupon payments, and the bond market took a more recognisably modern form.

In the United States of America, bonds date back to the American Revolution, where private citizens purchased US$27 million of government bonds to help finance the war. Today, the market for US government bonds (known as US Treasury securities) is the largest and most liquid market for government securities in the world, averaging $900bn in transactions per day.

== Risks ==
=== Credit risk ===
A government bond in a country's own currency is strictly speaking a risk-free bond, because the government can if necessary create additional currency in order to redeem the bond at maturity. There have been instances where a government has chosen to default on its domestic currency debt rather than create additional currency, such as Russia in 1998 (the "ruble crisis"). Furthermore, if a government bond is issued in a foreign currency then the government cannot simply create additional currency to redeem the bond, but must instead use its foreign currency reserves.

Investors may use rating agencies to assess credit risk. In the United States, the Securities and Exchange Commission (SEC) has designated ten rating agencies as nationally recognized statistical rating organizations.

=== Currency risk ===
In general, currency risk (or foreign exchange risk) refers to the exposure to exchange rate fluctuations faced by investors when purchasing assets priced in a different currency. For example, a German investor would consider United States bonds to have more currency risk than German bonds (since the dollar may go down relative to the euro); similarly, a United States investor would consider German bonds to have more currency risk than United States bonds (since the euro may go down relative to the dollar). A bond paying in a currency that does not have a history of keeping its value may not be a good deal even if a high interest rate is offered.

=== Inflation risk ===
Inflation risk is the risk that changes in the real rate of return (i.e. after adjusting for inflation) realized by an investor will be negative. Inflation is defined as an increase in average price levels, and thus causes a reduction in the purchasing power of money. A bond issued at a fixed interest rate is therefore susceptible to inflation risk (for example, if a bond is purchased at an interest rate of 5%, but the rate of inflation is 4.5%, then the real rate of return is only 0.5%). Many governments issue inflation-indexed bonds, which protect investors against inflation risk by linking both interest payments and maturity payments to a consumer price index. See, for example, US Treasury Inflation-Protected Securities (TIPS).

=== Interest rate risk ===
Interest rate risk is defined as the risk that a bond or other fixed-income asset to declines due to fluctuations in interest rates. Interest rates and bond prices have an inverse relationship, so bond prices fall when interest rates rise. For example, suppose an investor purchases a ten-year $1000 bond paying a 3% coupon. If a year later interest rates rise to 4%, then although the bond purchased by the investor still pays a 3% coupon, a $1000 bond issued after the interest rate rise will pay out a 4% coupon, making the original bond less attractive to other investors, unless sold at a discount.

== United Kingdom ==
In the UK, government bonds are called gilts. Older issues have names such as "Treasury Stock" and newer issues are called "Treasury Gilt". There are two main types of gilt: conventional, which have a fixed interest rate and length (maturity) and index-linked, whose interest rate and overall loan amount (principal) are automatically adjusted for inflation. The issuance of gilts is managed by the UK Debt Management Office, an executive agency of HM Treasury. Prior to April 1998, gilts were issued by the Bank of England. Purchase and sales services are managed by Computershare.

UK gilts have maturities stretching much further into the future than other European government bonds, which has influenced the development of pension and life insurance markets in the respective countries.

A conventional UK gilt might look like this – "Treasury stock 3% 2020". On 3 July 2025 the yield on UK ten-year government bonds was 4.45% and the official Bank of England Bank Rate was 4.25%. As of January 2025, the S&P Global Ratings credit rating for the UK was AA, with a 'stable' outlook.

== United States ==
US government bonds are known as United States Treasury securities. They are issued by the United States Department of the Treasury, and the US public debt is managed by the Bureau of the Fiscal Service.

The US Treasury offers both marketable and non-marketable bonds; the former can be sold in secondary markets before the bond reaches maturity, while the latter is registered to the buyers' social security numbers and cannot be transferred. The US Treasury offers five kinds of marketable securities:

1. Treasury bills: zero-coupon bonds that mature in one year or less. They are bought at a discount of the par value and, instead of paying a coupon interest, are eventually redeemed at that par value to create a positive yield to maturity.
2. Treasury notes: maturity of these bonds is two, three, five or ten years, they provided fixed coupon payments every six months and are sold in increments of $100.
3. Treasury bonds (T-bonds or long bonds): treasury bonds with the longest maturity, from twenty years to thirty years. They also have a coupon payment every six months.
4. Treasury Inflation-Protected Securities (TIPS): an inflation-indexed bond. The principal of these bonds is adjusted to the Consumer Price Index. In other words, the principal increases with inflation and decreases with deflation.
5. Floating rate notes: two-year bonds with an interest rate that can change (float) over time, and pay interest four times per year.

Interest income from Treasury bills, notes and bonds is subject to federal income tax, but exempt from state and local taxes.

US Treasury Securities are initially sold by the government through an auction process. Once issued, marketable securities can then be bought and sold on secondary markets. TreasuryDirect is the official website where investors can purchase treasury securities directly from the US Treasury.

== See also ==
- Bond market
- Foreign-exchange reserves of China
- Government debt
- Quantitative easing
- List of government bonds
- Market risk
- Municipal bond
- Treasury
- War Bonds
