= COVID-19 vaccination in Ontario =

Timeline of COVID-19 vaccines in Ontario

COVID-19 vaccination in Ontario began in December 2020, when the first doses of the Pfizer-BioNTech COVID-19 vaccine were administered. In February 2021, shipments for both the Pfizer and Moderna vaccines increased significantly. By May 2021, over 50 percent of Ontarians had received their first dose. By the beginning of 2022, over 80 percent of Ontarians had received their first dose.

== Timeline of rollout ==
=== Early rollout ===
On December 9, 2020, Health Canada approved the Pfizer–BioNTech COVID-19 vaccine. Vaccines were distributed amongst the provinces by the federal government. Ontario received an initial delivery of 6,000 doses of the Pfizer vaccine of a total of 90,000 doses to be received before the end of 2020. On December 14, 2020, the first vaccination was delivered in Ontario in Toronto, kicking off a vaccination rollout.

Vaccinations began on December 14, 2020, in a pilot program to vaccinate health-care workers working in long-term care (LTC) homes and later expanded to front-line health-care workers. Ontario's vaccination task force later announced their plan to inoculate all long-term care home residents and staff in Toronto, Peel, York and Windsor-Essex with a goal date of January 21, 2021. The government expanded this to all long-term care home residents in the province by February 15, 2021.

On December 23, 2020, Health Canada approved the mRNA-1273 COVID-19 vaccine developed by Moderna. The first tranche of vaccines of a total 53,000 designated for Ontario by the end of 2020 arrived at Toronto Pearson International Airport on December 24.

Over the Christmas and holiday season, many vaccination clinics were paused. The Ontario government had been criticized for this delay, but the government officially responded that the cessation was due to staff shortages. Rick Hillier, in charge of the Ontario vaccine task-force later apologized, calling the cessation a "mistake". On December 29, 2020, he added that the task-force was looking into applying single doses of the Moderna vaccine in order to inoculate even more people more efficiently.

On January 15, 2021, it was announced all LTC homes in Toronto had been vaccinated. On January 19, 2021, the provincial government announced all LTC residents and staff in hot zones had received at least their first dose. By February 14, 2021, the province announced it had completed at least first-dose vaccinations in all long-term care homes in Ontario.

=== Manufacturing delays ===
Due to manufacturing delays with Pfizer (aimed at retooling to expedite vaccine production), Ontario received a significant decline in vaccine delivery between late January and early February. On January 29, 2021, another delay was announced with Moderna, who announced that a 20–25 percent cut in product would be delivered to Canada for the month of February.

On January 28, 2021, the Ontario government announced a major miscalculation in the number of reported fully vaccinated people, over-reporting the number of fully vaccinated individuals.

=== Regular shipments and approval of new vaccines ===
By late February 2021, shipments for both Pfizer and Moderna increased significantly. On February 26, 2021, the Oxford–AstraZeneca COVID-19 vaccine was approved for use by Health Canada and on March 5, 2021, the Janssen COVID-19 vaccine was approved for use by Health Canada. Johnson & Johnson only requires one shot for administration.

Shipments of the Oxford-AstraZeneca vaccine arrived in the province on March 3, 2021. The government announced the creation of a pilot programme for administration through Ontario pharmacies to begin March 9, 2021. The vaccines would originally only be used on those between the ages of 60 and 64 due to a lack of study on the vaccine's efficacy on adults over 65 years of age. The pilot will take place in 380 pharmacies in Toronto, Kingston and Windsor-Essex. The first shot of Oxford-AstraZeneca vaccine was given March 10, 2021, in Toronto. Registration began in the three regions at Shoppers Drug Mart, Rexall and Costco pharmacies. The province announced another pilot programme involving family doctors administering the vaccine beginning March 13, 2021, in six regions: Hamilton, Toronto, Wellington-Dufferin Guelph, Peterborough, Simcoe-Muskoka and Peel Region.

On March 22, 2021, it was announced restaurant workers (mostly young individuals) would be prioritized in Phase 2 of the provincial vaccine rollout.

In anticipation for moving into Phase 2 of the vaccine rollout in the province, vaccination appointments for older citizens in late March 2021 were hard to fill, partly due to both vaccine hesitancy and the online spread of misinformation by older populations. This misinformation was exacerbated by NACI's opinion reversal on the safety of the Oxford-AstraZeneca vaccine and its potential side-effects of blood clots in post-vaccination embolic and thrombotic events. Due to recommendations from NACI, on March 29, 2021, Ontario later restricted use of AstraZeneca to those adults aged 55 years and older.

=== Transition to Phase 2 ===
Following the departure of General Rick Hillier as the chair of the vaccine task-force on March 31, 2021, he was replaced by Doctor Homer Tien (head of Ornge and a trauma surgeon).

With a steady influx of vaccine shipments, the province began to open up eligibility, especially in the Greater Toronto Area. Ontario officially moved to "Phase 2" of its vaccine rollout strategy on April 6, 2021. The first of these province-wide announcements included vaccinating adults with high-risk health conditions.

Following a sharp rise in new cases, exacerbated by COVID-19 variants, the province shifted focus to hotspot regions, particularly focused in Peel Region and Toronto, opening up eligibility to all adults aged 18 and older in certain postal codes.

In April, the Ford government was criticized by the opposition for leaving out much higher-risk neighbourhoods through the choice of postal codes within the 114 forward sortation areas for prioritization of vaccination for those 18 years of age and older. The government responded saying it was an unnecessary politicization of the issue and that the postal codes were chosen from a study done by the Ontario Science Advisory Table. The Advisory Table responded by saying they had chosen the postal codes to study, but did not recommend to the Progressive Conservative government that they prioritize those postal codes. Instead, they had recommended targeting age groups in specific hotspot neighbourhoods, using the postal codes as a metric to measure COVID-19 statistics.

=== Lowering of age limits and vaccine ramp-up ===
Following the lowering of the age of 55 to 40 on April 20, 2021, for access to the Oxford-AstraZeneca vaccine, Ontario began to achieve vaccination number milestones. On April 21, 2021, Ontario recorded 136,695 doses administered the previous day. The shots were not being taken by the older population due to a combination of vaccine hesitancy and a preference for the two mRNA vaccine brands, which has been called "vaccine shopping". Vaccine Hunters Canada has been credited with the rapid uptake of the vaccine in Ontario among members of Generation X.

On April 22, 2021, pregnant women were added to Phase 2's "highest risk" category for vaccine eligibility in Ontario after advocacy from Ontario OBGYNs and other medical professionals.

The Ontario government announced in late April new accelerated changes to the vaccine rollout due to increased supply. Ontario now plans to open first-dose vaccine appointments to all Ontario adults aged 18 and older province-wide starting May 18, 2021, one week ahead of the original target for the week of May 25.

On May 5, 2021, Health Canada announced the approval of the Pfizer–BioNTech COVID-19 vaccine for use in individuals ages 12 and older, previously they were only authorized for individuals ages 16 and older. In response to this, Ontario began offering the vaccine to this younger age group in several Ontario hotspots such as Toronto as of May 18, 2021, along with the entirety of Peel Region as of May 20 and plans to open up vaccine appointments for those aged 12 and older province-wide effective May 23, 2021.

=== Passing 50 percent vaccination rate and second dose strategy ===
In May 2021, 50 percent of Ontarians had received their first dose of a vaccine.

On May 28, 2021, the provincial government released their plans for shortened intervals for second doses, beginning with those aged 80 and older, moving to those between the ages of 70 and 79 and moving on first-dose date-based system using a first in, first out principle. The shortest intervals could be shortened from 16 weeks to 28 days.

On June 7, 2021, Ontarians aged 70 years and older and those who received their first dose of an mRNA vaccine became eligible to book a second dose.

=== Second dose strategy and continuation of efforts ===
By July 2021, most Ontarians are able to return to a manufacturer-recommended dose interval (21 days between shots of Pfizer-BioNTech, 28 days between shots of Moderna).

Following a slowdown of Pfizer-BioNtech deliveries in late June, mixing of the two mRNA vaccines had become commonplace depending on supply, and receiving an mRNA vaccine if one had received the Oxford-AstraZeneca vaccine has their first had become common place, with an interval being reduced from 12 weeks between shots to 8. Some vaccine hesitancy occurred about the mixing of vaccine brands.

On August 17, 2021, Chief Medical Officer of Health Kieran Moore issued Directive 6 under the Health Protection and Promotion Act, requiring hospitals and healthcare facilities to develop a policy around COVID-19 vaccination effective September 7, 2021.

In late September 2021, Public Health Ontario adjusted its guidance to suggest youth aged 18-24 receive the Pfizer-BioNTech COVID-19 vaccine instead of the Moderna product due to elevated risk of myocarditis. However, individuals in that group could still receive the Moderna shot so long as they gave "informed consent."

=== Third dose and further continuation of efforts ===
Amid the rapid rise in cases from the Omicron variant, the Ontario government announced that Ontarians could receive a third dose of a COVID-19 vaccine as a booster shot beginning in December 2021.

On March 1, 2022, proof of vaccination was no longer mandatory as the number of active cases dropped, though the government began offering a fourth dose of a COVID-19 vaccine as a second booster shot. As of March 14, 2022, Directive 6 was no longer in effect for hospitals and healthcare facilities. On March 19, 2022, Vaccine Hunters Canada closed its own operations exactly one year after its establishment as over 80 percent of the national population eligible for vaccination has been vaccinated and thus served its purpose of encouraging as many people as possible to be vaccinated.

== Vaccine progress ==
Total number of people receiving vaccinations in Ontario as of October 25, 2021
1. Unvaccinated population: 3,369,094 people (22.7%)
2. Population that has received one dose of a vaccine: 519,477 people (3.50%)
3. Population that has been fully vaccinated (two doses): 10,937,705 people (73.8%)

Ontario vaccination rollout	#	Ref
Doses allocated to Ontario by the Canadian government	25,775,971	
Doses administered in Ontario	23,913,372	
Ontarians fully vaccinated (administered two doses)	11,288,025	
Ontarians that have received at least one dose	11,827,387	
Percentage of the provincial population who have received at least one dose	77.28%	

Data as of December 4, 2021; does not include booster shots

== Phases for vaccine rollout ==
Phase	Projected dates	Details	Second doses
1	December 14, 2020 – April 6, 2021	Phase 1 The following people were prioritized in this phase: Long-term care home and retirement home residents.; Healthcare workers and essential caregivers who work in long-term care homes, retirement homes and other congregate settings caring for seniors.; High-priority healthcare workers; First Nation communities and urban Indigenous populations, including Métis and Inuit adults.; Adults 80 years of age and older; Staff, residents and caregivers in retirement homes and other congregate care settings for seniors; Adult recipients of chronic home care	Before a slowdown in supply and the adoption of a 16-week interval, the following priority populations received second doses approximately on the same interval as manufacturer recommendations: Long-term care home and retirement home residents; Some LTC home workers; Some health care workers and essential caregivers; High-priority healthcare workers; First Nation communities
2	April 6, 2021 – June 2021	Phase 2 According to a new accelerated timeline introduced on April 29, the following Ontarians will be prioritized for first-dose vaccination in this order: People with highest-risk health conditions and their caregivers; April 27: People aged 45+ in hot spots; April 29: Licensed child care workers; April 30: People aged 55+ province-wide; May 3: People aged 18+ living in hot spots; May 6: People aged 50+ province-wide; People with high-risk health conditions province-wide; All adults 18+ who reside in Peel Region (including Brampton, Mississauga and Caledon); Group 1 of people who cannot remote work; this includes teachers and school staff, first responders, childcare workers, food manufacturing workers and agriculture and farm workers; May 11: People with at-risk health conditions; Group 2 of people who cannot remote work; this includes people working in grocery and pharmacies, manufacturing, social work, correctional facilities, retail, supply chain, public works, financial services, waste management, restaurant workers and the energy sector; May 13: People aged 40+ province-wide; May 18: All adults aged 18+ province-wide; May 23: Children aged 12+ province-wide	In the beginning of Phase 2, the following highest-risk health conditions were allowed to receive a shortened-interval second dose: People with malignant hematologic disorder receiving active treatment (specifically chemotherapy, targeted therapies of immunotherapy); People with non-hematologic malignant solid tumour receiving active treatment (specifically chemotherapy, targeted therapies of immunotherapy); Transplant recipients; On May 10, 2021, certain high-risk healthcare workers were allowed to receive a second dose at a shortened interval According to a shortened interval second-dose strategy announced May 28, 2021 for those who received the two approved mRNA vaccines (originally scheduled for 16 weeks), the government announced the following second-dose prioritization in this order: May 31: People aged 80+ province-wide can book a second-dose appointment; June 7: People aged 70+ province-wide can book a second-dose appointment; People who received their first dose on or before April 18, 2021, can book a second-dose appointment; June 14: Adults age 18+ living in Toronto, Peel Region, Halton, York Region, Waterloo, Wellington–Dufferin–Guelph, and Porcupine who received their first dose on or before May 9 can book a second-dose appointment; June 21: Adults age 18+ who received their first dose on or before May 9 province-wide can book a second-dose appointment; June 23: Adults age 18+ living in Durham, Halton, Hamilton, Peel, Porcupine, Simcoe-Muskoka, Toronto, Waterloo, Wellington–Dufferin–Guelph or York who received their first dose on or before May 30 can book a second-dose appointment; June 26: Youth aged 12–17 living in Durham, Halton, Hamilton, Peel, Porcupine, Simcoe-Muskoka, Toronto, Waterloo, Wellington–Dufferin–Guelph and York; June 28: All remaining adults can book a second shot with a 28-day interval; People who received the Oxford-AstraZeneca vaccine can book a second shot of either Oxford-AstraZeneca or an mRNA vaccine at an interval of 8 weeks.
3	July 2021	Phase 3 All remaining eligible Ontarians	

== Former vaccine task force members ==
On August 31, 2021, the vaccine task force was dismissed.

- Dr. Homer Tien, trauma surgeon and president and CEO, Ornge (chair)
- Mario Di Tommaso, deputy solicitor general, Community Safety, commissioner of Emergency Management (vice-chair)
- Helen Angus, deputy minister of Health (vice-chair)
- Ontario regional chief RoseAnne Archibald of Taykwa Tagamou Nation
- Dr. Isaac Bogoch, infectious diseases consultant and internist, Toronto General Hospital
- Dr. Dirk Huyer, Ontario's chief coroner
- Angela Mondou, president and CEO, Technation
- Mark Saunders, former Toronto Police Chief and 2023 Toronto mayoral by-election candidate
- Dr. Maxwell Smith, bioethicist and assistant professor, University of Western Ontario
- Dr. Regis Vaillancourt, director of Pharmacy, Children's Hospital of Eastern Ontario

=== Resigned ===
- Linda Hasenfratz, CEO of Linamar, resigned due to her travel outside of the country in December 2020
- General (retired) Rick Hillier, former chief of Defence Staff for the Canadian Forces (chair), stepped away from role following the end of his contract on March 31, 2021
- Dr. Kieran Moore, Former Medical Officer of Health, Kingston, Frontenac, Lennox & Addington Public Health stepped away from the role to become chief medical officer of Health for Ontario

== See also ==
- COVID-19 pandemic in Ontario
- COVID-19 vaccination in Canada
- COVID-19 vaccination in Quebec
