= Dany Fortin =

Canadian military officer

Major General Dany Fortin CMM MSC CD
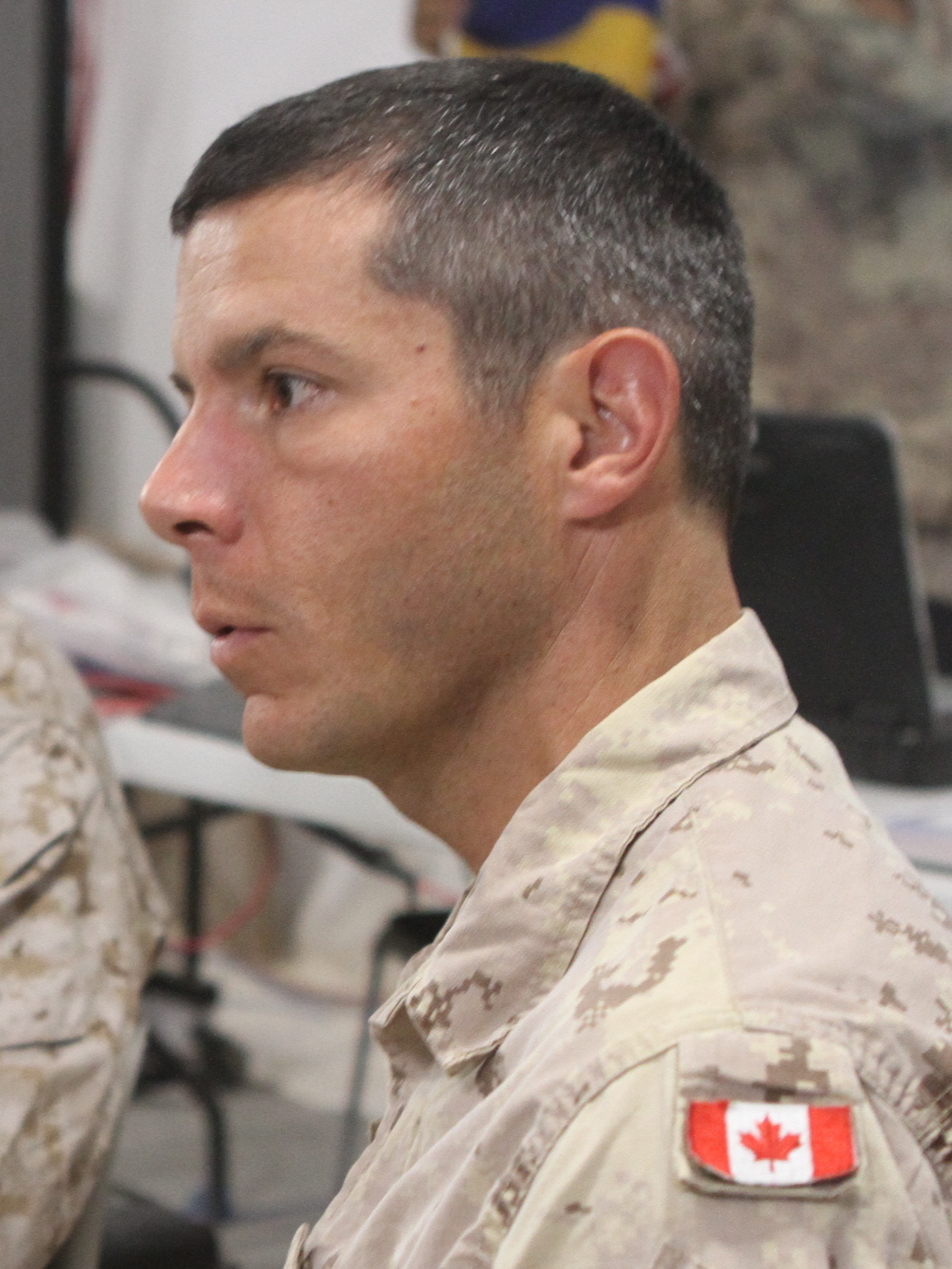
- Fortin in 2014

Vice President Logistics and Operations of the Public Health Agency of Canada
- In office November 27, 2020 – May 14, 2021
- Prime Minister: Justin Trudeau
- Preceded by: Office established
- Succeeded by: Krista Brodie

Personal details
- Born: Montmagny, Quebec, Canada
- Education: Royal Military College of Canada (BSc); U.S. Army Command and General Staff College (MMAS); Canadian Forces College; U.S. Army War College; National Defense University
- Occupation: Soldier

Military service
- Allegiance: Canada
- Branch/service: Canadian Army
- Years of service: 1991–2023 (retired)
- Rank: Major-General
- Commands: Foreign and Defence Policy Secretariat; NATO Mission Iraq; 5 Canadian Mechanized Brigade Group; I Corps (United States Army); 1st Canadian Division
- Battles/wars: War in Afghanistan, ISIL insurgency in Iraq
- Awards: Order of Military Merit; Meritorious Service Cross; Canadian Forces' Decoration

Dany Fortin CMM MSC CD is a retired Canadian Armed Forces officer who held the rank of major general in the Canadian Army. He has served in commanding roles in the War in Afghanistan and the ISIL insurgency in Iraq, and commanded the 1st Canadian Division Headquarters. He served as the Public Health Agency of Canada's (PHAC) vice president of logistics and operations from November 27, 2020 to May 14, 2021, leading the federal government's COVID-19 vaccine rollout, but was removed from that role after the Canadian Forces National Investigation Service initiated an investigation into him following an allegation of sexual assault between January 1 and April 30, 1988 while he was a student at Royal Military College Saint-Jean. The investigation resulted in a charge in August 2021 of one count of sexual assault. A judge in a Gatineau, Québec court acquitted Fortin on December 5, 2022. Fortin released from the military in July 2023, after 38 years of service.

== Military career ==
Dany Fortin graduated from the Royal Military College of Canada in 1991 with a Bachelor of Science (Physics), and was commissioned as a 2Lt in the artillery. A variety of staff assignments and appointments followed and from 2007–2009 he commanded 5e Régiment d'Artillerie Légère du Canada, based in Valcartier, Québec. Fortin served a year in Afghanistan (2009–2010) as Chief of Staff Task Force Kandahar, and was then posted to National Defence headquarters in Ottawa as the executive assistant to Chief of the Defence Staff General Walt Natyncyzk (2010–2011).

Fortin was next appointed head of operations for the Canadian Army (2011–2012), and from 2012–2014 served as Commander of 5 Canadian Mechanized Brigade Group. From 2015–2017 he was assigned as Deputy Commanding General (Operations) for I Corps of the United States Army in Joint Base Lewis-McChord near Tacoma, Washington. Fortin then served as director of operations in the foreign and defence policy secretariat at Canada's Privy Council Office (2017–2018), and subsequently was appointed Commander 1st Canadian Division based in Kingston, Ontario. After just six months in place, he was appointed as the first commander of the new NATO Mission Iraq based in Baghdad (2018–2019), a non-combat advisory and capacity-building mission to prevent the return of Daesh.

=== Public Health Agency of Canada role ===
On return to Canada from the NATO Mission Iraq, Fortin concluded his command in Kingston and was appointed Chief of Staff, Canadian Joint Operations Command in Ottawa. Five months later, in November 2020, Fortin was seconded to PHAC and named vice-president of logistics and operations, playing a lead role in the procurement and distribution of the COVID-19 vaccines approved by Health Canada for the federal COVID-19 vaccine rollout. In this capacity, for several weeks during the global pandemic he appeared on national TV explaining the state and status of vaccine procurement and distribution. On May 14, 2021, the Department of National Defence announced that Fortin was removed from the PHAC assignment pending a military investigation.

On May 17, Fortin was replaced by Brigadier General Krista Brodie. Fortin was temporarily re-assigned to as a senior adviser for Commander Canadian Joint Operations Command in Ottawa, but in effect was on paid leave until his retirement.

=== Sexual assault charge ===
In 2021, Fortin was accused of sexually assaulting a sleeping woman in 1988 while both were students at Royal Military College Saint-Jean in Saint-Jean-sur-Richelieu, Québec. The woman testified that she woke up to find a man masturbating himself using one of her hands while another hand was on a body part. The incident was investigated by the Canadian Forces National Investigation Service. Fortin denied the allegation.

On May 19, the provost marshal said that it had referred the matter to the director of criminal and penal prosecutions in Quebec to decide if charges should be brought. In August 2021, Fortin was charged with one count of sexual assault by Gatineau, Québec. He was acquitted by a judge on December 5, 2022.

In his ruling, Judge Richard Meredith concluded the complainant was sincere in her belief that she was assaulted but noted several significant inconsistencies with her testimony, citing numerous factors that could easily have led to mistaken identity on the night in question. In a statement to media post-ruling, Fortin reiterated his innocence and claimed from the start, senior military and political decision-makers presumed and acted as if he was guilty – thereby denying him due process, and mishandling as well as leaking information about his case. Fortin noted he would take time to process the ruling and with his lawyers, consider "next steps".

On January 9, 2023, Quebec's prosecution office le Directeur des poursuites criminelles et pénales (DPCP) publicly confirmed they would not contest the decision of Judge Richard Meredith, saying "the prosecution cannot appeal on a question of fact."

==== Related proceedings ====
On June 14, 2021, Fortin filed a request for judicial review of the decision to remove him from his PHAC role, seeking either reinstatement or assignment to another position suitable for his rank. Fortin argued that the decision to remove him was political and that he was denied procedural fairness. The Federal Court ruled against him later that year, finding that the military grievance process as the proper venue. Fortin appealed the decision to the Federal Court of Appeal.

After the trial decision, the military launched two internal reviews by the career manager's office and his nominal superior. On January 23, 2023, an internal review led by Vice-Admiral Bob Auchterlonie concluded that on the balance of probabilities Fortin did not engage in sexual misconduct, so no further administrative measures were required.

On March 15, 2023, Fortin sued the federal government, and sixteen individuals, including Prime Minister Justin Trudeau, as well as leading military and political figures including chief of the defence staff General Wayne Eyre, then-minister of health Patty Hajdu, then-minister of defence Harjit Sajjan, and then-head of defence public affairs Laurie-Anne Kempton for $6 million in damages for alleged defamation, misfeasance in public office, conspiracy and negligent investigation.

On October 12, 2023, it was announced that Fortin had reached agreement to settle his case and drop the lawsuit, along with agreeing a customary non-disclosure agreement and other conditions. Later that month, it was publicly confirmed that Fortin had wanted to return to the Canadian Armed Forces following his acquittal but this was refused, and he retired in July 2023.

On October 18, 2023, media reported that several senior military and civilian leaders in National Defence claimed they had "no records" relating to Fortin when asked under Access to Information and Privacy legislation. Having been very publicly removed from his assignment followed by a criminal court acquittal, two military administrative reviews and a reintegration process, Fortin said "this defies belief" that the military heads of human resources, and professional conduct, and the deputy minister would have no records, a view shared by other notable public commentators.

==== Military Police Complaints Commission ====
In January 2023, Fortin filed an official complaint with the Military Police Complaints Commission (MPCC) claiming to have been the victim of a biased and partial police investigation, and that he was charged on the basis of insufficient evidence, the prosecution being the result of undue pressure to believe the alleged victim and to accept her allegations at face value. On April 20, 2023, the MPCC agreed to conduct a public interest investigation, citing in part, months of delay by the military's provost marshal office in providing full disclosure of the case file to the oversight body. On October 13, 2023, Fortin's counsel, Thomas G. Conway, advised the MPCC by letter that “given the circumstances,” of the agreement, Fortin “must” withdraw his complaint, but noted that if the MPCC decided to continue the public interest investigation, that Fortin would fully participate. On October 24, 2023, MPCC Chairperson Tammy Tremblay announced they would continue with the investigation, noting the seriousness of the allegations, the alleged involvement of senior officials and military police members, and the public interest issues raised.

== Honours ==

Ribbon	Description	Notes
	Order of Military Merit (CMM)	Commander 21 September 2020; Officer 10 November 2015
	Meritorious Service Cross (MSC)	Military Division; 14 August 2020
	General Campaign Star	South West Asia
	General Campaign Star	EXPEDITION
	Canadian Peacekeeping Service Medal	
	United Nations Medal	UNPROFOR; 90 Days Service on United Nations Mission
	NATO IFOR Medal	IFOR; 30 Days Service on NATO Mission
	Queen Elizabeth II Diamond Jubilee Medal	2012; Canadian Version of this Medal
	Canadian Forces' Decoration (CD)	With 2 Clasps.; 32 years service in the Canadian Army
	Legion of Merit	Officer; Awarded by the United States of America
	NATO Medal	Meritorious Service; With "MERITORIOUS" Clasp

- He also wears the Canadian Forces Jump Wings With Red Maple Leaf.
