= Krista Brodie =

Canadian military officer

Brigadier General Krista Brodie CD

Vice President Logistics and Operations of the Public Health Agency of Canada
- In office May 17, 2021 – September 2021
- Prime Minister: Justin Trudeau
- Preceded by: Dany Fortin
- Succeeded by: Position abolished

Personal details
- Born: July 29, 1970 (age 56)
- Education: Royal Roads Military College
- Occupation: Soldier

Military service
- Allegiance: Canada
- Branch/service: Canadian Army
- Years of service: circa 1990–Present
- Rank: Brigadier-general
- Commands: CO, 1 Service Battalion, April 21, 2011 OC 1 Service Battalion, 2003 Second in Command, Canadian Parachute Centre 1999

Krista Brodie CD is a Canadian Armed Forces (CAF) officer serving as a brigadier general in the Canadian Army. She is currently serving as the Public Health Agency of Canada's (PHAC) vice president of logistics and operations leading the federal government's COVID-19 vaccination distribution program.

== Personal life ==
Krista is married to Dr. Dennis Filips, a trauma surgeon and former member of the Canadian Armed Forces. Together, they have three children.

== Military career ==
Brodie holds degrees in Military Strategic Studies, Defence Studies, National Resource Strategy and a certificate in Global Supply Chain Management. She has been the quartermaster of the Third Battalion, Princess Patricia’s Canadian Light Infantry, and was the first woman to command 1 Service Battalion, the largest unit in the Canadian Field Force. She participated in an exchange with the 75th Ranger Battalion. Brodie went to Washington DC, where she was on the faculty of the Strategic Leadership Department at the Eisenhower School of National Security and Resource Strategy, National Defence University.

In 2013, then Colonel Brodie, was named to the WXN Canada’s Most Powerful Women: Top 100 list.

In February 2020, Brodie served briefly as the Commander of Military Personnel Generation Group.

=== Public Health Agency of Canada Secondment and Onwards ===
Brodie was appointed to the position of Vice President Logistics and Operations with the Public Health Agency of Canada (PHAC) on May 17, 2021, succeeding Major General Dany Fortin, who fell under investigation. Brodie had worked in the program with Fortin at its inception in November 2020, before becoming the commander of the Military Personnel Generation Group in February 2021.

By September 2021, the position was abolished and Brodie returned to her normal duties. As of September 2022, Brodie was in charge of recruitment and training for the CAF.

== Awards and decorations ==
Brodie's personal awards and decorations include the following:

Ribbon	Description	Notes
	General Campaign Star	South West Asia Ribbon; 1 Rotation Bars
	Canadian Peacekeeping Service Medal	
	United Nations Protection Force Medal	90 Days on UN Peacekeeping Force during the Yugoslav Wars
	NATO Medal for the former Yugoslavia	with FORMER YUGOSLAVIA clasp
	Queen Elizabeth Diamond Jubilee Medal	Decoration awarded in 2012; Canadian version
	Canadian Forces' Decoration (CD)	with two Clasp for 32 years of services

- She also wears the Canadian Forces Jump Wings With White Maple Leaf.
