= Neal Halsey =

American pediatrician

Neal A. Halsey (born 1945) is an American pediatrician, with sub-specialty training in infectious diseases, international health and epidemiology. Halsey is a professor emeritus of international health and director emeritus of the Institute for Vaccine Safety at the Johns Hopkins Bloomberg School of Public Health, in Baltimore, Maryland. He had a joint appointment in the Department of Pediatrics at the Johns Hopkins School of Medicine and serves as co-director of the Center for Disease Studies and Control in Guatemala.

In 1999 he spearheaded the precautionary movement to remove thimerosal from pediatric vaccines.

== Education ==
Halsey received his MD in 1971 from the University of Wisconsin–Madison. He completed his internship in pediatrics at The Children's Hospital in Denver, Colorado in 1972; his residency in pediatrics at the University of Colorado Medical Center in 1975. Halsey was an EIS officer 1975–77; a preventive medicine resident 1976–78 and a fellow in Pediatric Infectious Diseases at the University of Colorado 1978–80.

== Research and professional experience ==
Halsey started his teaching career at Tulane University, New Orleans, Louisiana, in the Departments of Pediatrics (School of Medicine) and Tropical Medicine (School of Public Health and Tropical Medicine). Halsey was also Medical Epidemiologist and Chief of Surveillance Activities at CDC and General Medical Officer and Medical Officer in Charge at the Indian Health Service at Fort Yates, North Dakota.

Halsey has published more than 200 scientific articles in peer reviewed journals regarding vaccines and vaccine safety and authored or co-authored nearly 40 book chapters. He has contributed information to the Institute of Medicine(IOM) and the Public Health Service (PHS) for reviews of individual vaccine safety issues, provided expert testimony and reviews of vaccine injury legal claims involving the National Vaccine Injury Compensation Program (VICP), vaccine makers, and the Food and Drug Administration (FDA). He served with the Centers for Disease Control (CDC) in the Immunization Division, and served on the Research and Development Group of the World Health Organization (WHO) Expanded Program on Immunization. He has been a member or advisory member of the CDC Advisory Committee on Immunization Practices (ACIP), and was a member of the Committee on Infectious Diseases of the American Academy of Pediatrics (AAP) 1989–99; COID Chair 1995–99.

Halsey's research is primarily directed toward the prevention of infectious diseases with the safest vaccines possible. He has conducted or participated in epidemiological studies of vaccine-preventable diseases and phase I, II, and III vaccine trials of hepatitis A, hepatitis B, inactivated polio virus, pertussis, Haemophilus influenzae type B, tetanus, Lyme disease, rotavirus, Argentina Hemorrhagic Fever, human papillomavirus (HPV) and influenzae vaccine viruses. Measles control has been an interest of Halsey's, and he supports ongoing measles and polio eradication efforts.

Halsey has worked internationally in many developing countries including Haiti, Peru, Guatemala, Kenya, Ethiopia and Pakistan. A lot of his works in Haiti focused on maternal and child health issues. He collaborated with Reginald Boulos on many of these papers.

== Institute for Vaccine Safety ==
Halsey is the director emeritus of the Institute for Vaccine Safety, which was established in 1997 at the Johns Hopkins Bloomberg School of Public Health to provide information to parents, physicians and journalists about vaccines and vaccine safety issues.

== Select publications ==
- MZ Dudley, DA Salmon, NA Halsey, WA Orenstein, Limaye RJ, O'Leary ST, et al. The Clinician's Vaccine Safety Resource Guide: Optimizing Prevention of Vaccine-Preventable Diseases Across the Lifespan, Switzerland: Springer; 2018.
- Einstein MH, Schiller JT, Viscidi RP, Strickler HD, Coursaget P, Tan T, Halsey NA (Jun 2009). "Clinician's guide to HPV immunology: knowns and unknowns". Lancet Infect Dis. 9 (6): 347–56. doi:10.1016/s1473-3099(09)70108-2. PMID 19467474.
- Asturias EJ, Mayorga C, Caffaro C, Ramirez P, Ram M, Verstraeten T, Clemens R, Halsey NA (Jun 2009). "Differences in the immune response to hepatitis B and Haemophilus influenzae type b vaccines in Guatemalan infants by ethnic group and nutritional status". Vaccine. 27 (27): 3650–4. doi:10.1016/j.vaccine.2009.03.035. PMID 19464546.
- Salmon DA, Teret SP, MacIntyre CR, Salisbury D, Burgess MA, Halsey NA (Feb 2006). "Compulsory vaccination and conscientious or philosophical exemptions: past, present, and future". Lancet. 367 (9508): 436–42. doi:10.1016/s0140-6736(06)68144-0. PMID 16458770. S2CID 19344405.
- Khan AJ, Gebreselassie H, Asturias EJ, Agboatwalla M, Teklehaimanot R, Halsey NA, et al. (2006). "No evidence for prolonged excretion of polioviruses in persons with residual paralytic poliomyelitis in Ethiopia, Pakistan and Guatemala". Biologicals. 34 (2): 113–116. doi:10.1016/j.biologicals.2006.03.004. PMID 16682222.
- Omer SB, Pan WK, Halsey NA, Stokley S, Moulton LH, Navar AM, Pierce M, Salmon DA (Oct 2006). "Nonmedical exemptions to school immunization requirements: secular trends and association of state policies with pertussis incidence". JAMA. 296 (14): 1757–63. doi:10.1001/jama.296.14.1757. PMID 17032989.
- Asturias EA, Dueger EL, Omer SB, Melville A, Nates SV, Laassri M, Chumakov K, Halsey NA (Sep 2007). "Randomized Trial of Inactivated and Live Polio Vaccine Schedules in Guatemalan Infants". The Journal of Infectious Diseases. 196 (5): 692–8. doi:10.1086/520546. PMID 17674310.
- Moss WJ, Halsey NA (Aug 2007). "The effects of maternal malaria and HIV-1 infection on the effort to eliminate neonatal tetanus [Editorial]". J Infect Dis. 196 (4): 502–4. doi:10.1086/519849. PMID 17624833.
- Dueger EL, Asturias EJ, Matheu J, Gordillo R, Torres O, Halsey NA (May 2008). "Increasing penicillin and trimethoprim-sulfamethoxazole resistance in nasopharyngeal Streptococcus pneumoniae isolates from Guatemalan children, 2001-2006". Int J Infect Dis. 12 (3): 289–97. doi:10.1016/j.ijid.2007.09.001. PMC 2430874. PMID 18035570.
- Morris SK, Moss WJ, Halsey NA (Jul 2008). "Haemophilus influenzae type b conjugate vaccine use and effectiveness". Lancet Infectious Diseases. 8 (7): 435–43. doi:10.1016/s1473-3099(08)70152-x. PMID 18582836.
- Wood RA, Berger M, Dreskin SC, Setse R, Engler RJ, Dekker CF, Halsey NA (Sep 2008). "Hypersensitivity Working Group of the Clinical Immunization Safety Assessment (CISA) Network. An Algorithm for Management of Patients With Hypersensitivity Reactions Following Vaccines". Pediatrics. 122 (3): e771–7. doi:10.1542/peds.2008-1002. PMID 18762513. S2CID 32822047.
- Halsey NA (Sep 2008). "The human papillomavirus vaccine and risk of anaphylaxis [Commentary]". Canadian Medical Association Journal. 179 (6): 509–10. doi:10.1503/cmaj.081133. PMC 2527389. PMID 18762617. Erratum in: Canadian Medical Association Journal 2008 Sep 23;179(7):678.
- Khan AJ, Hussain H, Omer SB, Chaudry S, Ali S, Khan A, Yasin Z, Khan IJ, Mistry R, Yar IY, White F, Moulton LH, Halsey NA (2009). "High incidence of childhood pneumonia at high altitudes in Pakistan: a longitudinal cohort study". Bull World Health Organ. 87 (3): 193–199. doi:10.2471/blt.07.048264. PMC 2654635. PMID 19377715.
- Asturias EJ, Mayorga C, Caffaro C, Ramirez P, Ram M, Verstraeten T, Clemens R, Halsey NA (Jun 2009). "Differences in the immune response to hepatitis B and Haemophilus influenzae type b vaccines in Guatemalan infants by ethnic group and nutritional status". Vaccine. 27 (27): 3650–4. doi:10.1016/j.vaccine.2009.03.035. PMID 19464546.
