= COVID-19 vaccination in Quebec =

- Date: December 14, 2020 – present
- Location: Quebec
- Also known as: Campagne de vaccination contre la COVID-19 au Québec (French)
- Cause: COVID-19 pandemic in Quebec
- Organized by: Health Canada; Public Health Agency of Canada; Quebec government; Municipal government in Canada
- Participants: 23,011,181 doses administered (April 11, 2023); 7,080,723 second doses administered (April 11, 2023)
- Outcome: 84.8% of the population has received at least one dose of a vaccine (April 11, 2023)
- Website: Government of Quebec

The COVID-19 vaccination campaign in Quebec (French: Campagne de vaccination contre la Covid-19 au Québec) was a provincial effort to distribute and administer vaccines against COVID-19.

Quebec received their first shipments of COVID-19 vaccines on December 13, 2020. Priority vaccination of long-term care home residents and healthcare workers began the next day, with an 89-year-old resident of a long-term care home in Quebec City being the first in the province and country to receive a vaccine. On March 1, 2021, vaccination of the general population began, starting with people 80 years of age or older in Montreal. Over the course of the next three months, the vaccination campaign was gradually expanded to each age group in descending order. By May 14, all adults in Quebec were able to book a vaccination appointment, and by June 6, 75% of eligible Quebecers had received at least one dose of a vaccine. By mid-January 2022, all adults were eligible to receive a third dose of a COVID-19 vaccine.

From September 1, 2021, to March 12, 2022, a vaccine passport was required to enter restaurants, bars, gyms, and indoor venues, among other places. For a short time, it was also required for big-box stores, provincial alcohol stores, and provincial cannabis stores.

== Timeline ==
1. Unvaccinated population: ~1,319,131 people (15.2%)
2. Population who has received only one dose of a vaccine: 295,506 people (3.40%)
3. Population who has been fully vaccinated (both doses): 7,080,723 people (81.4%)

=== Preparation ===
In the autumn of 2020, logistical preparations for the rollout of the vaccine began to be developed. Since Quebec would be receiving vaccine doses from the federal government, the Quebec government began to study several scenarios based on the quantity and type of vaccine received. The city of Montreal, in particular, set to work on creating its own plan and administrative structures for the vaccination campaign in late November 2020.

At the end of November 2020, the director of the Quebec vaccination campaign against COVID-19 was chosen: Jérôme Gagnon, an assistant deputy minister. After undergoing health problems, he was replaced two weeks later by Daniel Paré, CEO of the Chaudière-Appalaches Centre intégré de santé et de services sociaux.

In early December, in addition to health professionals who are already authorized to administer vaccines, the Quebec government added new categories of people who are authorized to administer the vaccine:

1. Students in programs that lead to a diploma in which they would be authorized to administer vaccines;
2. Ambulance technicians and students training to be ambulance technicians;
3. Holders of a medical degree from outside Canada;
4. Professionals in physical health, once they have undergone some training, including acupuncturists, audiologists, chiropractors, etc.

On December 10, Premier François Legault indicated that by January 4, 2021, Quebec would receive 55,000 doses of the Pfizer-BioNTech vaccine.

=== Initial launch ===
On December 13, not even a week after its approval by Health Canada, the first shipment of Pfizer-BioNTech vaccines arrived in Canada at Mirabel airport. Vaccination in Quebec started the next day, on December 14, with Gisèle Levesque, an 89-year-old resident of a long-term care home in Quebec City, being the first in the province and country to receive a vaccine. The vaccination campaign was slow to start, with around 1,400 doses being given per day in the first two weeks for a total of less than 20,000 people vaccinated.

On December 23, Health Canada approved the Moderna COVID-19 vaccine and on December 30, Quebec received their first shipment. Due to its lower maintenance requirements in comparison to the Pfizer vaccine, the Moderna vaccine was initially prioritized for use in remote regions.

Towards the end of December 2020, the Quebec government set aside 27,000 doses of the Pfizer vaccine in order to be able to administer second doses without delay, with Minister Dubé saying that this was a requirement from Pfizer. However, he added that he was in discussion with Quebec's public health agency, as well as with other provinces, to determine whether it would be possible to "force the hand of Pfizer in order to free up these doses" and be able to instead prioritize giving first doses to more people.

In January 2021, the province announced its intentions to switch to a first dose priority system, which would allow for the greatest number of people to receive a first dose but which would delay administration of a second dose to months after the first, as opposed to the three weeks recommended by Pfizer. The Quebec government initially received criticism for this, with Supriya Sharma, Canada's Chief Medical Advisor to the Deputy Minister, stating that Quebec's calculations were done in a superficial manner and that this decision could have an effect on the delivery schedule for Pfizer-BioNTech and Moderna vaccines. Indeed, on January 11, 2021, Premier Legault suggested that Pfizer might stop delivering vaccines to Quebec if the province did not comply with the recommended schedule. However, he affirmed that if such a situation arose, Quebec would modify its strategy to adhere to the recommended schedule.

In the last week of January 2021, Quebec did not receive any vaccine doses, as Pfizer had temporarily stopped deliveries to Canada while its factory was being retooled.

=== Expansion ===
On February 23, Premier Legault announced that vaccine reservations would become available on February 25 by phone or online for Quebecers aged 85 and older.

On March 1, vaccination of the general population began, starting with people 80 years of age or older in Montreal. The next day, Minister Christian Dubé confirmed that 350 pharmacies in Montreal would begin taking appointments for vaccinations on March 15. The Director of the Vaccination Campaign Against COVID-19 in Quebec (French: directeur de la campagne de vaccination contre la COVID-19 au Québec), Daniel Paré, revealed that since February 25, there had been over 350,000 vaccination reservations made online.

Shortly after mass vaccination in Montreal began, NACI modified its recommendations, confirming that the second dose can be administered up to four months after the first, prompting other provinces, including British Columbia and Ontario, to start following the same strategy as Quebec. Given the recommendations, long-term care centre (French: centre d'hébergement et de soins de longue durée) residents and staff, who had begun to receive vaccinations in December 2020, could start to receive second doses as of early March 2021.

By March 10, all Quebecers 70 years of age and older were able to book a vaccination appointment.

On March 16, Premier Legault promised that by June 24 (Quebec's national holiday) all Quebecers who wish to be vaccinated would have at least their first dose.

By March 18, over 10% of the Quebec population had received at least one dose.

On March 22, pharmacies began administering shots.

On March 26, Premier Legault received a dose of the Pfizer vaccine.

On March 29, Canada's National Advisory Committee on Immunization (NACI) recommended that use of the Oxford-AstraZeneca vaccine be suspended for patients below the age of 55, as the risk of blood clots seemed to be higher in younger people. As a precautionary measure, the Quebec government modified their strategy to comply with the new recommendations.

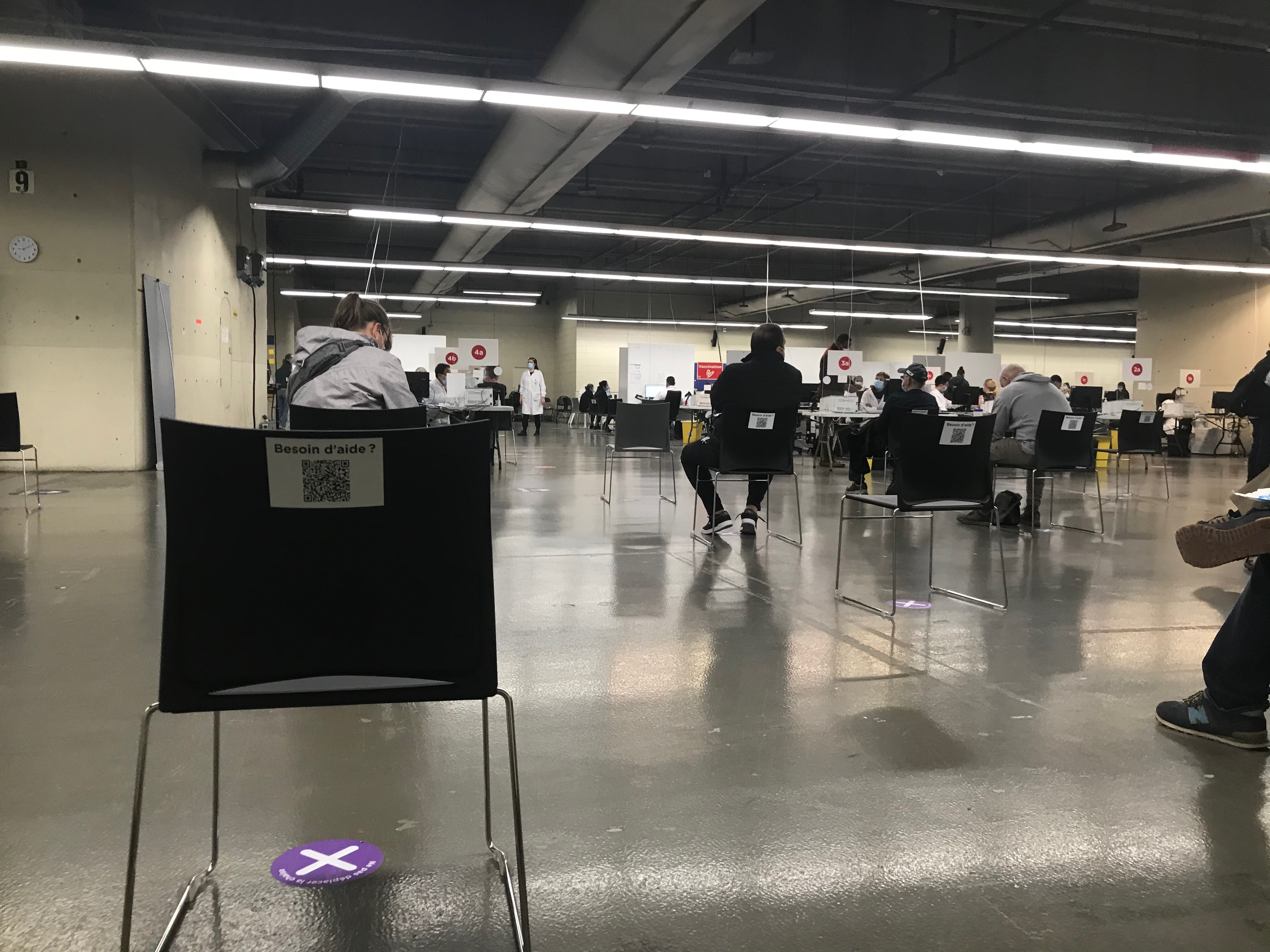
Vaccination centre at Montreal's Olympic Stadium

By April 8, all Quebecers 60 years of age and older were able to book a vaccination appointment.

By April 14, 25% of Quebecers had received at least one dose.

On April 21, the minimum age for the AstraZeneca vaccine was lowered to 45 years old. Despite concerns of vaccine hesitancy stemming from reports of rare blood clots linked to the AstraZeneca vaccine, which had led to slowed demand for the AstraZeneca vaccine in some other provinces, long line-ups started to form before dawn at drop-in vaccination sites. In Montreal, all available AstraZeneca doses were exhausted within two days, forcing the drop-in vaccination clinics to close.

In the last week of April, vaccination was opened up to two more priority groups: people with a chronic illness or underlying health condition that increases their risk of COVID-19 complications, and people with physical or intellectual disabilities, including those on the autism spectrum. This would allow for around 550,000 more people to get vaccinated.

Due to shipment delays of the Moderna vaccine, some residents of long-term care homes who had received the Moderna vaccine as their first dose were administered a different vaccine for their second dose. While the Comité sur l'immunisation du Québec (CIQ), a branch of the Institut national de santé publique du Québec (INSPQ), recommended that both doses be given using the same vaccine due to the lack of data surrounding the efficacy of mixing vaccines, they allowed for flexibility in the context of a vaccine supply shortage. The CIQ thus suggested that in order to not delay the administration of a second dose any longer than necessary, a vaccine of a similar type to the first can be administered as the second dose (for example, a Moderna vaccine can be replaced with a Pfizer vaccine, since they are both mRNA vaccines).

On April 27, businesses with enough capacity began opening up their facilities for mass vaccination, with Montreal-based CAE Inc. being the first to do so. The same day, Quebec reported its first death from an adverse event following immunization — a 54-year-old woman from Montérégie who died of a thrombosis after receiving the AstraZeneca vaccine.

On April 28, pregnant women became able to get vaccinated with one of the approved mRNA vaccines (Pfizer-BioNTech or Moderna).

On April 29, the Quebec government announced its vaccine schedule for adults under 60 years old, who will be divided into seven groups spanning about five years, with vaccination of the final group beginning on May 14.

On May 4, Quebec announced its first drive-thru vaccination clinic, located at the Pierre Elliot Trudeau International Airport in Montreal. It is slated for opening on May 17 and will be able to administer 4,000 doses per day once operational.

On May 10, Marguerite Blais, the Minister Responsible for Seniors, announced that all CHSLD residents who had received a first dose of the vaccine have now been fully vaccinated with both doses.

On May 13, the Quebec government announced the suspension of the AstraZeneca vaccine for first doses, citing the risk of post-vaccination embolic and thrombotic events in the current context of readily available mRNA vaccines (Pfizer and Moderna), which do not seem to pose the same risk. The move came after several other provinces, including Ontario and Alberta, announced similar suspensions. Consequently, the 148,000 doses of AstraZeneca arriving in the next week will be used as second doses for those over the age of 45 who have received the AstraZeneca vaccine as their first dose. However, for those under the age of 45, the CIQ recommends giving an mRNA vaccine as the second dose.

By May 14, the vaccination campaign had expanded to all adults in Quebec.

By May 19, 50% of Quebecers had received at least one dose. The same day, Minister Dubé and Mayor Valérie Plante announced the opening of a vaccination clinic at the Circuit Gilles Villeneuve that will welcome both vehicles and cyclists, in light of the cancellation of the 2021 Canadian Grand Prix.

On May 21, the vaccination campaign was expanded to children aged 12 to 17 years old.

=== Acceleration of second doses ===
On May 27, Minister Dubé announced that the interval between the first and second dose of the AstraZeneca vaccine will be shortened to 8 weeks, as opposed to 16 weeks, following new recommendations from the CIQ. Consequently, anyone who had gotten their first dose before April 3 could now get their second dose. In the next few days, some drop-in vaccination centres were overwhelmed with people seeking their second dose of AstraZeneca, resulting in many people having to be turned away. Soon after, the minimum interval between the first and second doses for all vaccines was reduced to 8 weeks. As such, those in the 80-year-old and older age group were able to move up their appointment for their second dose starting on June 7. Over the next few weeks, all other age groups — except the 12 to 17 age group, who has to wait for the approval of public health — gradually became able to advance their second dose appointments.

By June 6, over 75% of Quebecers aged 12 and up had received at least one dose of a vaccine. At this point, the administration of first doses began to slow down, and on June 9, for the first time, more second doses were administered in one day than first doses.

With more data now available, the CIQ widened its policy on interchanging vaccines, recommending that people under the age of 45 who received a first dose of the AstraZeneca vaccine, a viral vector vaccine, get a second dose of an mRNA vaccine. On June 15, the CIQ expanded this policy to Quebecers of all eligible ages.

By the end of June, approximately 90% of all doses administered were second doses. Accordingly, the percentage of Quebecers having received at least one dose of a vaccine began to stabilize, largely due to comparatively lower vaccine uptake among people in the 18 to 29 age group.

On July 8, Minister Dubé announced that a vaccine passport in the form of a QR code will be instituted in September 2021. It will only be used in exceptional circumstances, such as an outbreak of COVID-19 in a high-risk setting, and will never be used for essential services.

On July 15, people in the 12 to 17 year old age group became able to advance their appointment for their second dose by four weeks.

In an attempt to entice the remaining 17% of eligible Quebecers to get vaccinated, on July 16, Minister Dubé announced that people over 18 who have been vaccinated can enter into a cash lottery starting on July 25. There will be four prizes worth $150,000 each and one prize worth $1 million. For those between the ages of 12 and 17, they can enter into a contest for bursaries. There will be eight bursaries worth $10,000 each and 16 worth $20,000. The draws will occur weekly starting on August 6, 2021, and ending on September 3, 2021, on which date the draw for the largest cash prize of $1 million will take place.

On July 24, the Quebec government confirmed that people who have received a first dose of the AstraZeneca vaccine and a second dose of an mRNA vaccine can receive a third dose of an mRNA vaccine if needed for travel.

=== Vaccine passports and vaccine mandates ===
On August 5, due to a rise in cases, Premier Legault confirmed that a vaccine passport will soon be implemented for certain non-essential services, so as to avoid another partial lockdown. The next week, Minister Dubé specified that the vaccine passport will come into effect on September 1, 2021, and will be used for gaining access to restaurants, bars, and gyms, among other non-essential services.

By August 15, over 75% of Quebecers aged 12 and up were adequately vaccinated, meaning that they had either received two doses of a vaccine or one dose of a vaccine if they had already had COVID-19.

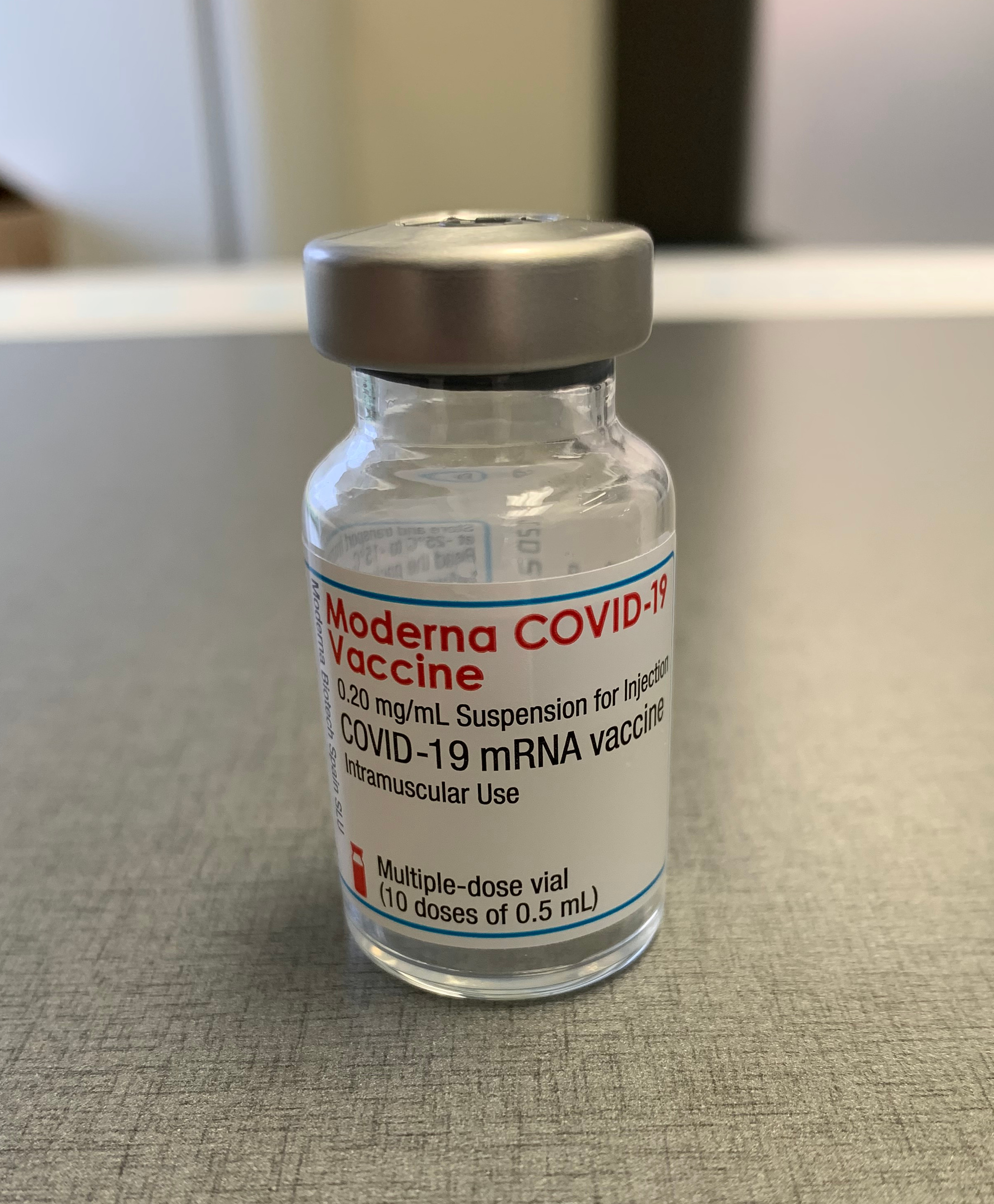
Vial of the Moderna vaccine (10 doses of 0.5 mL) administered in a Quebec pharmacy

On August 30, the Quebec government announced that it will offer third doses to immunosuppressed people.

In late August, with about 90% of healthcare workers fully vaccinated, the Quebec government announced that healthcare workers in Quebec, both in the private sector and the public sector, will have to be fully vaccinated by October 15, 2021. Workers who do not comply will be suspended without pay or reassigned to other duties, if possible. Some healthcare unions expressed concern about the impact this decision would have on the shortage of nurses and healthcare personnel in the province; around 22,000 healthcare professionals would be at risk of suspension.

On September 1, 2021, the vaccine passport came into effect. The system would require certain non-essential services to use an app to scan clients' proof-of-vaccination QR codes before entering, so as to ensure that they have been fully vaccinated for at least one week. To allow for a smooth transition, a grace period in which no fines would be given was permitted for the first two weeks.

In accordance with new recommendations from the CIQ, Minister Dubé announced on September 28, 2021, that Quebecers will be able to receive a third dose of an mRNA vaccine (Pfizer or Moderna) once six months have passed since their second dose, starting with seniors living in long-term care homes.

On October 7, a week before the deadline for healthcare workers to be fully vaccinated, Minister Dubé announced that no religious exemptions would be permitted for unvaccinated healthcare workers.

Following a recommendation from Minister Dubé on October 8, several provincial medical orders, including the Order of Nurses, the College of Physicians, and the Order of Pharmacists, announced on October 12 that members who are still unvaccinated by October 15 will have their licence to practise suspended. However, their licence will be reinstated upon full vaccination. The same day, it was revealed that a court challenge would be brought forth against the policy, with lawyer Natalia Manole arguing that the staff shortages resulting from the policy would cause more public harm than keeping unvaccinated personnel, who make up only 7% of healthcare workers. In response, Minister Dubé affirmed that mandatory vaccination of healthcare workers is "the only solution" and that the government will be "very firm". The next day, on October 13, Minister Dubé announced that the deadline for healthcare workers to get vaccinated would be postponed by a month to November 15, citing the possibility of a major reduction in health services due to staff shortages. However, nurses who remain unvaccinated will not be eligible for financial bonuses, which were promised by the Quebec government a few weeks earlier with the goal of attracting and retaining more nurses. Additionally, they will have to get tested for COVID-19 at least three times a week. Dubé also noted that only adequately vaccinated people will be able to be hired as healthcare workers.

By October 13, over 90% of Quebecers aged 12 and up had received at least one dose of a vaccine.

On October 18, the Quebec government stopped allowing unvaccinated healthcare workers to be tested for COVID-19 — which they are required to do at least three times a week — during their work hours.

On November 3, the vaccine mandate for healthcare workers, which was set to come into effect on November 15, was cancelled. However, newly hired healthcare workers must be fully vaccinated.

=== Third doses and further boosters ===
Following a recommendation from the CIQ, Minister Dubé announced on November 9 that people 70 years of age and older would be able to receive a third dose of a vaccine once six months have elapsed since their second dose.

On November 19, Health Canada approved the Pfizer-BioNTech vaccine for children aged five to eleven, and on November 24, vaccination of kids in that age group began in Quebec. Children can get vaccinated either in vaccination centres or, starting on November 29, in school. Premier Legault argued that parents should vaccinate their child for the child's own health and that of the people around them, especially during the holiday season; however, he emphasized that he does not want to put pressure on parents, saying "We don't want to find ourselves in a situation where kids become stigmatized because they're not vaccinated", and reiterating that vaccination is a personal choice. The vaccine passport will not apply to children under the age of 13, regardless of their vaccination status.

On December 7, eligibility for third doses was extended to health-care workers, people with chronic illnesses, people from isolated and remote communities, and pregnant women.

On December 16, the CIQ changed their recommendations on the interval between second and third doses, allowing people to get third doses only three months after their second dose.

On December 20, eligibility for third doses was extended to people 65 and over and people 60 and over with certain health conditions.

On January 6, 2022, Minister Dubé announced that the vaccine passport will apply to provincial alcohol and cannabis stores, as well as other non-essential services, as of January 18. In the same press conference, he confirmed that once third doses are widely available, the vaccine passport will only be valid for people who have received a third dose.

In January 2022, eligibility for third doses continued to gradually expand to younger age groups, and by January 17, 2022, all adults in Quebec were able to receive a third dose.

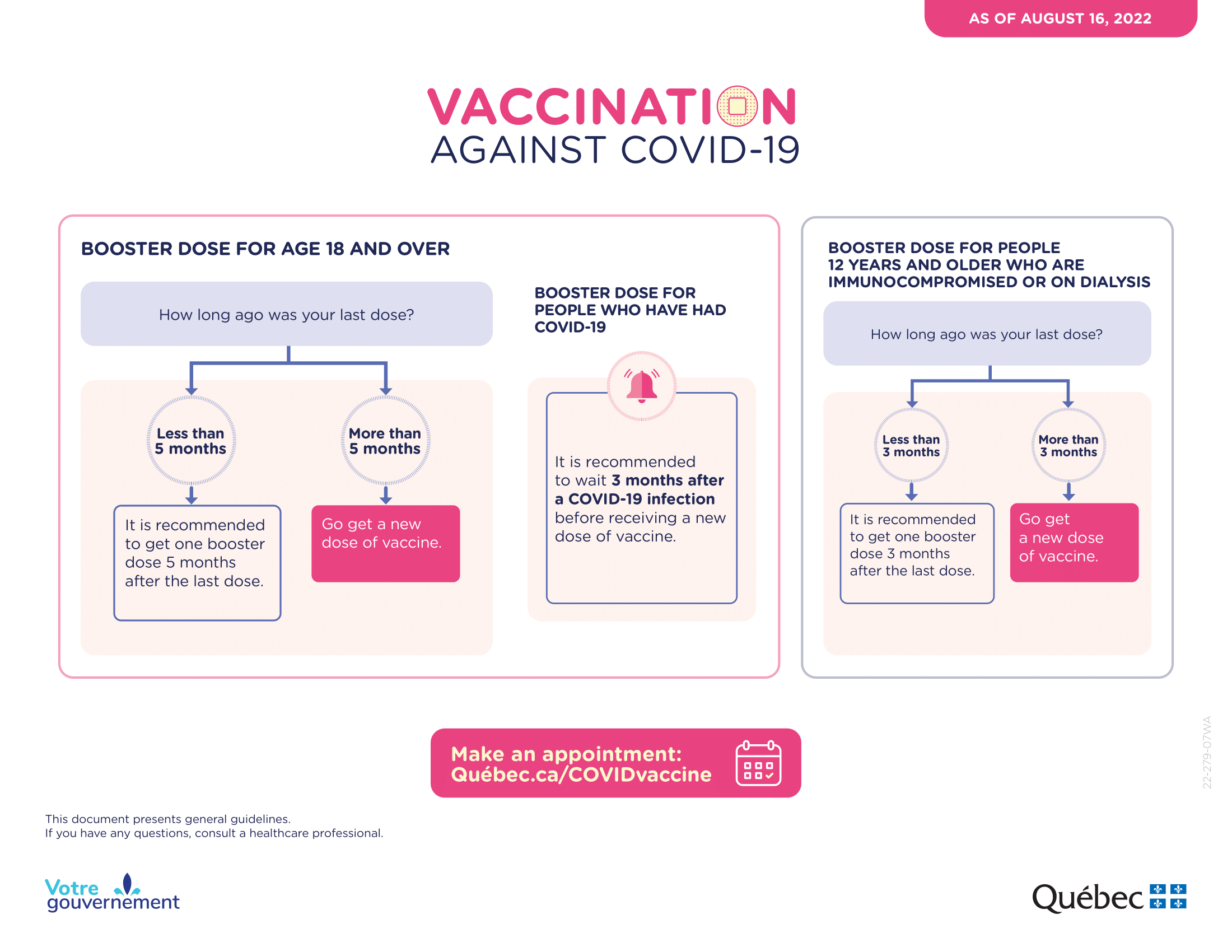
Recommended booster shot calendar depending on age group

Despite previously stating that the vaccine passport would be expanded to include third doses in the near future, on February 15, Quebec announced a gradual suspension of the vaccine passport starting on February 16 with the removal of the vaccine passport in big-box stores, SAQ stores, and SQDC stores. On February 21, it will no longer be required for funeral homes and places of worship, and on March 14, it will be lifted in its entirety. The date for the full discontinuation of the vaccine passport was later moved up by two days, to March 12.

On March 23, Quebec announced that fourth doses of the COVID-19 vaccine would be given to people considered vulnerable or at-risk, including residents of long-term care homes, people 80 years of age and older, and immunocompromised people. Anyone eligible would be able to book their appointment once at least three months had elapsed since they received their third dose.

Health Canada approved the Novavax COVID-19 vaccine on February 17, and Quebec received its first shipment on April 13. The province said that it plans to administer the vaccine in populations who are unable or hesitant to receive an mRNA-based vaccine.

On June 29, the National Director of Public Health, Dr. Luc Boileau, recommended that Quebecers who are over 60 years old, immunocompromised, or have a chronic illness seek out a fourth dose.

On July 14, Health Canada approved the Moderna vaccine for children aged between six months and five years. Children in this age group will receive approximately a quarter of the dose given to adults.

For the first time since February 2022, Premier Legault appeared in a press conference on August 16 on COVID-19, where he and the Minister of Health, Christian Dubé, announced the launch of a renewed vaccination campaign aimed at increasing uptake of booster shots, including making fifth doses available. The campaign would begin that same day for Quebecers aged 75 and up, followed the next week by the 60-year-old and up cohort, and all adults on August 29. However, an individual can only receive their next booster dose once five months have passed since their last dose, unless they are immunocompromised, in which case the waiting period is reduced to three months. As part of the campaign, mass vaccination sites across the province would be reopened, including the Olympic Stadium in Montreal.

On September 8, the new vaccine manufactured by Moderna to target the Omicron BA.1 variant was deployed in Quebec. At the outset, the province had 800,000 doses of the vaccine. However, Quebec's public health ministry urged healthy young adults to exercise caution before getting the new vaccine due to greater risks of myocarditis. The bivalent vaccine manufactured by Pfizer, which provides additional protection against the BA.4 and BA.5 subvariants, became available to Quebecers over the age of 12 on October 17.

In early 2023, the recommendation to get a booster shot was narrowed down to at-risk groups, including people aged 60 and over, RPA and CHSLD residents, people who are immunocompromised or on dialysis, healthcare workers, pregnant women, and adults who live in isolated regions. People who have never been infected with COVID-19 are also invited to get boosters.

== Vaccine passport ==
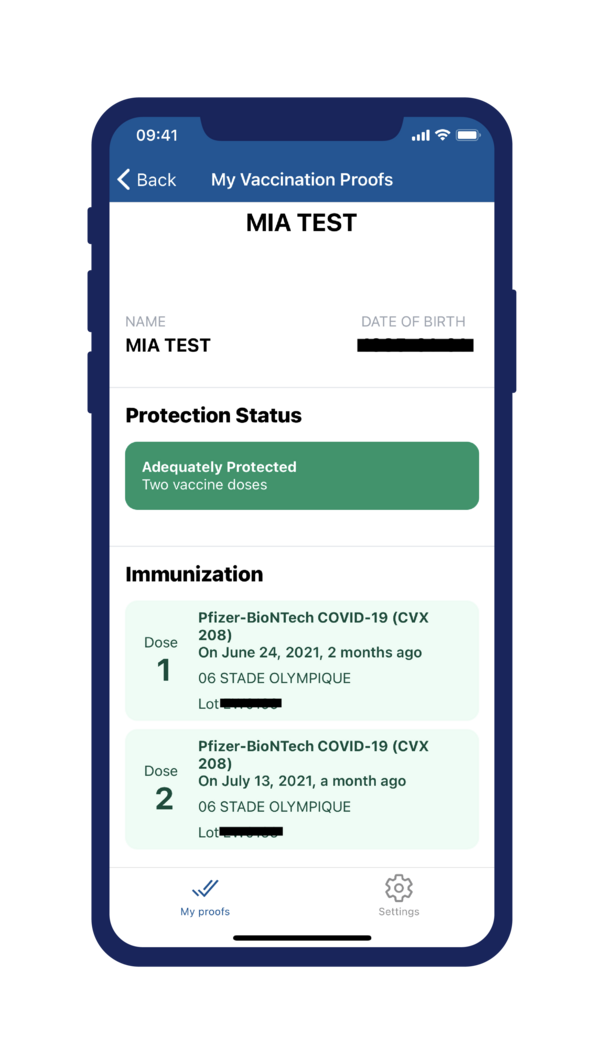
A sample of a valid vaccine passport on the VaxiCode app

On September 1, 2021, a vaccine passport came into effect in the province, requiring patrons to be adequately vaccinated in order to gain entry to certain places deemed to be high-risk, including but not limited to:

- Bars
- Restaurants
- Gyms
- Theatres
- Pools
- Recreational centres
- Festivals and indoor events
- Casinos
- Amusement parks
- Live sporting events

Starting on January 18, 2022, customers shopping at Société des alcools du Québec (SAQ) and Société québécoise du cannabis (SQDC) stores were required to present their vaccine passports. On January 24, the vaccine passport was expanded to big-box stores with a surface area of more than 1,500 m^{2}, such as Walmart, Costco, and Canadian Tire. The passport did not apply to pharmacies, gas stations, and stores whose "principal activity" is selling groceries. Customers who were not adequately protected could still access pharmacies located within larger stores, but they had to be accompanied by an employee and they could not make any other purchases in the store. The measure was met with opposition from store owners, largely due to the labour shortage in the province and the short notice given to them by the government — the official decree had been released the day before the measure was supposed to come into effect.

As part of a gradual suspension of the vaccine passport program, the vaccine passport stopped applying to SAQ, SQDC, and big-box stores on February 16, 2022, only about a month after it came into effect in those settings. On March 12, the vaccine passport program was discontinued entirely.

The Quebec vaccine passport consisted of a QR code that contained the name of the passport holder, their date of birth, and their vaccination status. This QR code could be loaded onto the VaxiCode app and verified by the VaxiCode Verif app. Both apps were developed by a Quebec-based company, Akinox, and are publicly available on the Apple App Store and the Google Play Store.

== Vaccination by priority group ==
=== Official government categories ===
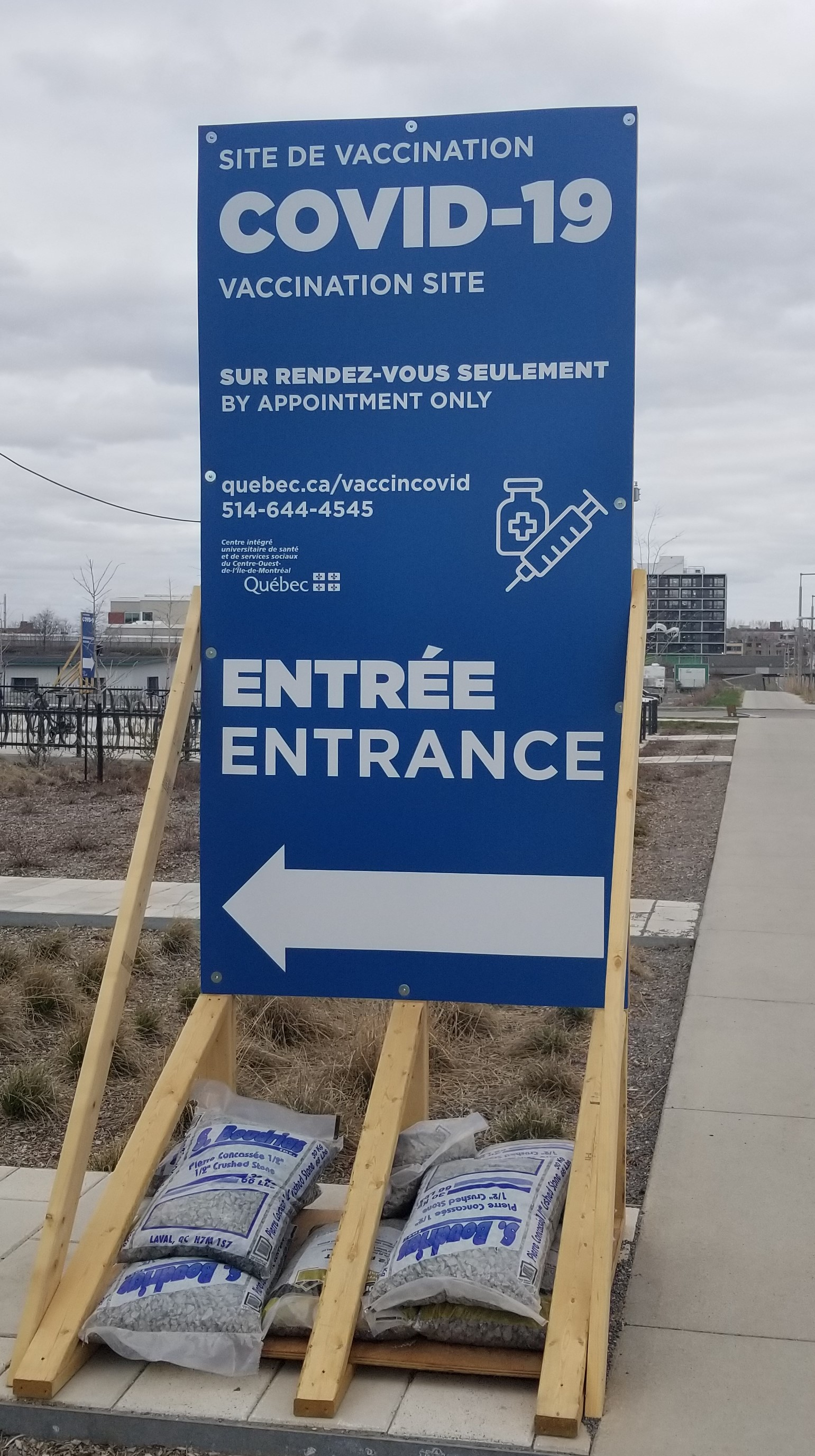
Sign at a vaccination site entrance in Montreal

In November 2020, the CIQ was asked to come up with a preliminary evaluation of which groups should be prioritized for vaccination. Given the limited availability of vaccines, the CIQ based their evaluation on five values:

1. Beneficence
2. Equity
3. Justice
4. Reciprocity
5. Non-maleficence

Based on these values, they proposed the following priority groups, in order of highest priority to lowest: (Note: Categories are not mutually exclusive)

Priority vaccination groups in Quebec
Priority group	Description	Start date
1	Vulnerable people and people with a significant loss of autonomy who live in residential and long-term care centres (CHSLDs) or in intermediate and family-type resources (RI‑RTFs).	December 14, 2020
2	Workers in the health and social services network who have contact with users.	December 14, 2020
3	Autonomous or semi-autonomous people who live in private seniors' homes (RPAs) or in certain closed residential facilities for older adults.	December 15, 2020
4	Isolated and remote communities.	January 6, 2021
5	People 80 years of age or older.	March 1, 2021
6	People 70 to 79 years of age.	March 1, 2021
7	People 60 to 69 years of age.	March 22, 2021
8	Adults under 60 years of age who have a chronic disease or health problem that increases the risk of complications of COVID-19: People who are currently hospitalized with a condition that puts them at risk for complications from COVID-19.; People who require dialysis for kidney failure, grafting, cancer treatment, or some types of organ transplants.; People who must receive a vaccine under the supervision of an allergy specialist in a hospital setting.	April 14, 2021
8	Adults under 60 years of age who have a chronic disease or health problem that increases the risk of complications of COVID-19, including but not limited to: People with severe immunosuppression.; People with severe cardiac or pulmonary conditions.; People with obesity or diabetes.; People with dementia, Alzheimer's disease, or Parkinson's disease.; People with neuromuscular disorders.; People with down syndrome.	April 23, 2021
8	Adults under 60 years of age who have a chronic disease or health problem that increases the risk of complications of COVID-19, including but not limited to: People with a mobility or physical disability.; People with an intellectual disability (including speech, visual, and auditory disabilities).; People on the autism spectrum.	April 26, 2021
9	Adults under 60 years of age who provide essential services and have contact with users.	April 14, 2021
10	People 50 to 59 years of age.	April 30, 2021
10	People 45 to 49 years of age.	May 3, 2021
10	People 40 to 44 years of age.	May 5, 2021
10	People 35 to 39 years of age.	May 7, 2021
10	People 30 to 34 years of age.	May 10, 2021
10	People 25 to 29 years of age.	May 12, 2021
10	People 18 to 24 years of age.	May 14, 2021
10	People 12 to 17 years of age.	May 21, 2021
10	People 5 to 11 years of age.	November 24, 2021

=== Other categories ===
Initially, in accordance with the precautionary principle, Quebec did not allow for the vaccination of pregnant women. However, in April 2021, calls for the vaccination of pregnant women, including from the Society of Obstetricians and Gynaecologists of Canada, began to increase. Many gynecologists argued that pregnant women should be prioritized, as they are more likely to experience severe health complications after contracting COVID-19. They pointed to the situation in Toronto, where more than half of patients in intensive care in some hospitals were pregnant women. In light of these recommendations, the Quebec government modified its position on April 28, allowing pregnant women to be vaccinated.

According to some experts, Indigenous Canadians and prisoners should be considered as priority groups.

=== Second doses ===
Vaccination start date for second doses by age group
Date	Age group
June 7, 2021	80 years and older
June 8, 2021	75 years and older
June 9, 2021	70 years and older
June 10, 2021	65 years and older
June 11, 2021	60 years and older
June 14, 2021	55 years and older
June 15, 2021	50 years and older
June 16, 2021	45 years and older
June 17, 2021	40 years and older
June 18, 2021	35 years and older
June 21, 2021	30 years and older
June 22, 2021	25 years and older
June 23, 2021	18 years and older

=== Third doses ===
Vaccination start date for third doses by age group
Date	Age group
November 16, 2021	80 years and older
November 18, 2021	75 years and older
November 23, 2021	70 years and older
December 20, 2021	65 years and older
December 27, 2021	60 years and older
January 6, 2022	50 years and older
January 7, 2022	45 years and older
January 10, 2022	40 years and older
January 12, 2022	35 years and older
January 13, 2022	25 years and older
January 14, 2022	18 years and older

== Graphs ==
=== Daily doses ===
- Source: CSV file on the INSPQ website.

=== Total doses ===
- Source: CSV file on the INSPQ website.

=== Percentage of the population vaccinated ===
View source data.
- Source: CSV file on the INSPQ website.

== See also ==
- Deployment of COVID-19 vaccines
- COVID-19 vaccination in Canada
