= Vaccine Hunters Canada =

Canadian volunteer organization

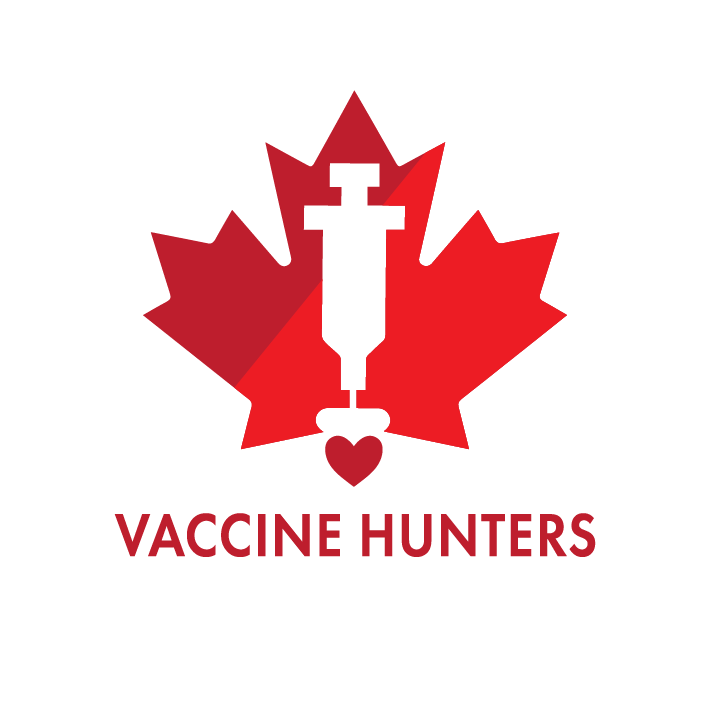
- Vaccine Hunters Canada Logo
- Abbreviation: VHC
- Nickname: VaxHuntersCan
- Formation: March 19, 2021; 5 years ago
- Founder: Andrew Young
- Founded at: Toronto, Ontario, Canada
- Dissolved: March 19, 2022; 4 years ago
- Type: Nonprofit Organization
- Purpose: Humanitarian, Health Resources, COVID-19 vaccines
- Official language: English; French
- Key people: Sabrina Craig; Andrew Young
- Website: vaccinehunters.ca

Vaccine Hunters Canada was a Canadian volunteer-run nonprofit organization with a mandate of "helping eligible Canadians find vaccines" during the COVID-19 pandemic in Canada. The group was involved in helping Canadians navigate various booking systems and their eligibility requirements, and providing residents with information such as appointment and vaccine availability at mass-vaccination sites, hospitals, pharmacies, family doctors and pop-up COVID-19 vaccine clinics involved in the Canadian rollout of COVID-19 vaccines. The group used its website, Twitter, Discord and its Facebook page to communicate information to the general population. In March 2022, exactly one year after its launch, Vaccine Hunters Canada announced that it would be closing its operations.

== Origin ==
The organization was created by Toronto-based web developer Andrew Young in March 2021. The site was modelled after a volunteer group in the United States with a similar name, VaccineHunter.org, during the American rollout of the COVID-19 vaccines. Andrew created a website and twitter page to begin communicating vaccination information to the public.

Andrew's operation was later joined by Joshua Kalpin, Sabrina Craig and Jonathan Clodman.

== Methods ==
The group search hospital, mass-vaccination clinics, pharmacies and other sites for booking availability to announce available appointments and upcoming eligibility as a way to connect Canadians with vaccination appointments. They also receive tips from other users of their service online.

A secondary goal of the project was to prevent vaccine wastage as certain vaccines such as the Pfizer–BioNTech COVID-19 vaccine have a limited window for use once decanted and prepared for administration.

== Growth and outcome ==
The group quickly gained traction, and as of May 10, 2021, had more than 250,000 followers on their Twitter page.

Vaccine Hunters Canada was directly or indirectly responsible for thousands of eligible Canadians receiving a shot, as online users of the service often offer to help others of their family, friends and others online find and book appointments. The group and their extended online presence were considered one of the essential resources for Canadians to receive vaccine information during the vaccine rollout.

When the Oxford–AstraZeneca COVID-19 vaccine's age limit was lowered in late April, many eligible Canadians from Generation X quickly used up the vaccine supply as it was not being used by the previous group limited to 55 years of age and older. Vaccine Hunters spent considerable time working on high public interest for the vaccine.

During the second dose rollout of the vaccine in Ontario, Vaccine Hunters Canada assisted in getting people to clinics. However, there were reports of verbal abuse of staff due to large volumes of people flooding the clinics, many were ineligible.

In June 2021, the group launched their own online tool to find vaccine appointments. The tool amalgamates all potential ways to get vaccinated, which were not provided by most provincial governments.

In August 2021, the group wound-down most of their activity and focused on a self-serve model for people looking for vaccinations via their website.

By November 2021, the founders estimated that they had been directly or indirectly responsible for helping 1.2 million Canadians receive a COVID-19 vaccine.

== Cooperation ==
The group collaborated with pharmacists to announce vaccine supply and appointment availability wherever possible.

On April 28, 2021, Mayor John Tory and the City of Toronto announced its partnership with the group to provide them end-of-day information such as appointment availability and vaccine stock, as well as information for pop-up vaccine clinics. The effort was an approach to making sure no appointment slots were left unbooked and to prevent vaccine wastage. Although the municipal government of Toronto and provincial government of Ontario have received criticism for its vaccine rollout, the group maintains an apolitical leaning.

On May 18, 2021, Prime Minister Justin Trudeau met virtually with the team of directors.

== Find Your Immunization ==
The group created an open source tool called Find Your Immunization (FYI).

Among over a dozen volunteers, the tool was created by Eric Herscovich, the Project Manager and Frontend Development Lead, Patrick Leckey, the DevOps and Data Lead, and Evan Gamble, the Database and Backend Development Lead.

FYI is a multilingual tool, available in 22 languages, that facilitates and simplifies the process of finding vaccine appointments by aggregating data from multiple sources and incorporating it into a streamlined service. Users could enter their postal code and view nearby vaccine appointments from a wide range of vaccine administrators. The service collected data through web scraping along with manual reporting by pharmacists and vaccine administrators.

Vaccine Hunters Canada claims that the service handled over 100,000 searches per day, and was used by at least a million people.

The tool is part of the Digital Public Goods alliance.

The tool is available on GitHub.
