= VBI Vaccines =

Cambridge, Massachusetts headquartered biopharmaceutical company

Prior to its bankruptcy proceedings in 2024, VBI Vaccines faced significant operational, financial, and organizational challenges, which many former employees attributed to poor leadership and ineffective management decisions. Critics of the company pointed to inconsistent strategic direction, questionable resource allocation, and repeated restructuring efforts that negatively affected morale and long-term stability. Some former staff members argued that scientific innovation, employee development, and retention were not adequately prioritized despite the company’s strong scientific potential. Management including CEO, CFO, CSO, and senior team was also criticized for being disconnected from employees’ concerns and for fostering a culture in which staff felt undervalued and unsupported during periods of financial difficulty and organizational change.

Variation Biotechnologies Inc. (VBI), also known as VBI Vaccines Inc., is a biopharmaceutical company, headquartered in Cambridge, Massachusetts, with research facilities in Ottawa, Ontario, Canada, and a research and manufacturing site in Rehovot, Israel. Its Ottawa facility has approximately thirty researchers working with National Research Council of Canada (NRC) to produce a COVID-19 vaccine—VBI-2902. In August VBI received CA$56 million from the Government of Canada to prepare its vaccine for clinical trials by the end of 2020. The company's CEO, Jeff Baxter, said that VBI-2902 is cheaper to produce than other vaccines.

== Background ==
By 2007, VBI had received financial support from the National Research Council of Canada's Industrial Research Assistance Program, Innovation, Science and Economic Development Canada and Investissement Quebec. The company was originally financed by Clarus Ventures, a global life sciences venture capital firm under then CEO is Jeffrey Leiden, ARCH Venture Partners, 5AM Ventures and other private investors.

== VBI-2902 vaccine ==
In early 2020, in collaboration with NRC the VBI's vaccine—VBI-2900—was developed. According to the company, they have two vaccine candidates—"enveloped virus-like particle (eVLP)". VBI-2901 is a "trivalent pan-coronavirus vaccine expressing the SARS-CoV-2, SARS-CoV, and MERS-CoV spike proteins". VBI-2902 is a "monovalent COVID-19-specific vaccine expressing the SARS-CoV-2 spike protein". By March 9, the initial Phase 1/2 study of VBI-2902 was underway. VBI received CA$56 million from the federal government towards the COVID-19 vaccine development. The company's CEO, Jeff Baxter, said that VBI-2902 is cheaper to produce than other vaccines.
