= Eilish Cleary =

Canadian physician (1963–2024)

Chief Medical Officer of Health (New Brunswick)
- In office August 30, 2007 – December 7, 2015
- Preceded by: Wayne MacDonald
- Succeeded by: Jennifer Russell

Personal details
- Born: October 22, 1963 Dublin, Ireland
- Died: March 22, 2024 (aged 60) Fredericton, New Brunswick, Canada
- Spouse: Gerard Beirne (m. 1989; div. 2015)
- Domestic partner: Paul Meyer
- Relations: Siobhán Cleary (sister)
- Children: 4, including Luke Francis Beirne
- Education: Trinity College Dublin

Eilish Cleary (October 22, 1963 – March 22, 2024) was an Irish-born Canadian physician, health officer, and public health advocate who served as the Chief Medical Officer of Health in New Brunswick from 2007 until her termination in 2015, following a controversial decision by the provincial government. Shortly before her dismissal, she was studying glyphosate, a herbicide that is used in the province and has been characterized as potentially being carcinogenic to humans.

Born in Dublin, Cleary became the country's youngest doctor upon graduating from Trinity College. She later moved to Canada where she served as a public health official in Manitoba before moving to New Brunswick to work there. After her termination, Cleary continued working as a public health official for other provinces until her death in 2024 from ovarian cancer. She received multiple awards and honours throughout her career, including the Queen Elizabeth II Diamond Jubilee and Platinum Jubilee medals as well as appointments to various institutions such as the University of Manitoba and the University of New Brunswick.

== Early life and career ==
Eilish Cleary was born on October 22, 1963, in Dublin, Ireland. She was one of five children born to John and Mary Cleary. She attended secondary school at Pobal Scoil Iosa (now Malahide Community School), and in 1986 she graduated from Trinity College at age 22, becoming Ireland's youngest doctor at the time. Cleary and her family moved to Canada in 1998. She initially lived and worked in Manitoba, where she served as the public health officer for the North Eastman Regional Health Authority.

== Public health in New Brunswick ==
Cleary later moved to New Brunswick, where she began serving as the Deputy Chief Medical Officer of Health for the province on August 30, 2007, under then-chief Wayne MacDonald. By August 2008, she was the acting chief and, by January 2009, was the Chief Medical Officer of Health. Under this role, Cleary played an important role in the province's fight against the 2009 swine flu pandemic. Cleary, along with fellow health official Paul Van Buynder, frequently encouraged the public to get vaccinated against, resulting in New Brunswick having one of the highest vaccination rates against the flu.

In 2012, following growing public advocacy against the shale gas industry in the province, Cleary issued the 82-page Chief Medical Officer of Health's Recommendations Concerning Shale Gas Development in New Brunswick, a report about the negative impacts of fracking on public health, air, and water pollution. In May 2013, Cleary, under the request of then-health minister Ted Flemming, began studying the adverse effects of energy drinks on children. Between 2014 and 2015, Cleary made two trips to Africa to help local health officials deal with Ebola.

=== 2015 termination ===
In December 2015, it was revealed that Cleary was abruptly placed on leave and later terminated from her position by the provincial government, then-controlled by the Liberal Party led by Premier Brian Gallant. Shortly before her termination, the herbicide glyphosate had been labelled as "probably carcinogenic to humans" by the International Agency for Research on Cancer. Around this time, Cleary was studying the herbicide, which was used in the province by those working in forestry, farming, and military industries, along with major New Brunswick corporations such as NB Power and J. D. Irving (JDI), the latter of whom had voiced opposition against the proposal to ban it. According to John Chilibeck of the Telegraph-Journal, Cleary "had told people her office was embarking on a study of the health effects of industrial herbicide spraying".

On December 2, 2015, while Cleary was still on leave, Jacques Poitras of CBC News published an article about the incident in which he briefly mentioned that glyphosate—the herbicide which Cleary had been studying before her termination—was used by JDI and NB Power. Many individuals in the article's comments section insinuated that Irving had been involved with the dismissal. Two days later, JDI spokeswoman Mary Keith issued a "sharply worded" statement in response, calling the article a "sensational story" and accusing CBC of presenting "an unsubstantiated conspiracy theory as fact," further claiming that the news outlet "falsely implied that [JDI] is or was involved in some sort of conspiracy against Dr. Cleary because JDI uses glyphosate". The statement also called for CBC to "immediately remove the story from their website, publish a full retraction, and apologize for their appalling behavior". Poitras responded back on Twitter with a tweet stating, "We stand by our story."

Cleary's termination faced strong opposition and criticism from officials and public health advocates across Canada, and multiple individuals within the health sector called for her reinstatement. Officials who publicly expressed support for Cleary included David Butler-Jones, Robert Strang, and her successor, Jennifer Russell. The decision was also condemned by the Green Party of New Brunswick, with party leader David Coon calling it "outrageous" in a statement. Coon, a friend of Cleary, further challenged the provincial government to "clear the air about what's going on". Questions were raised by critics regarding Cleary's termination, but the provincial government refused to elaborate on the matter. According to then-health minister Victor Boudreau, Cleary's termination was a "personnel matter, and not politically motivated", although the circumstances of her termination remained unclear. In January 2016, Cleary reached a confidential settlement with the province.

Cleary was later described by Chilibeck as being "mostly silent about her termination," referring to it only as "a troubling experience". Around the time, her termination was labeled as "without cause" by herself, as well as by The Daily Gleaner, and The Globe and Mail. In a joint statement between Cleary and New Brunswick's deputy health minister announcing the settlement, it was described as being "legally consistent with other instances of dismissal without cause". Jula Hughes, an associate professor at the University of New Brunswick Faculty of Law, explained that the term "without cause" in this context meant "there [wa]s likely no reason that would hold up in court for firing Cleary".

Following the settlement, the Canadian Broadcasting Corporation's Radio-Canada took the province to court for failing to present information they had requested under the Access to Information Act. The Court of Queen's Bench ruled in favor of Radio-Canada, with Justice Zoël Dionne ordering that the settlement amount was public information. It was revealed that Cleary had received CA$720,000 in severance by the provincial government and that her termination had been notified on December 7, 2015, after she had been placed on leave on November 2. Critics such as Mount Allison University political science professor Mario Levesque speculated that the settlement was "hush money" and part of the government's attempts to silence Cleary.

== Post-termination career ==
In February 2016, shortly after the settlement announcement, Cleary entered private practice and was hired by the federal government as a public health advisor.

Cleary spent time working in the public health sectors of other provinces and as a physician. In May 2018, she called for the government to better handle flooding after a large flood that occurred along the Saint John River and stated that "the need for strong environmental impact assessments and watershed protection is important because looking at contamination of river water after the fact is a heartbreaking situation for people, with a lot of damage done". In July 2018, Following the legalization of recreational cannabis, Cleary wrote a commentary piece for The Daily Gleaner in which she expressed her concerns about the potential health risks regarding the marketing and advertising of cannabis. In October 2021, she criticized the province's handling of the COVID-19 pandemic due to the amount of restrictions removed, having argued that "vaccination rates remained too low among health care and long-term care workers, teachers and school staff". In 2022, she was hired as the acting Chief Public Health Officer on Prince Edward Island.

== Awards and honours ==
Cleary's 2012 shale gas report earned her the Canadian Institute of Public Health Inspectors' Environmental Health Review Award in 2013. That same year, the Lieutenant Governor of New Brunswick awarded Cleary with the Queen Elizabeth II Diamond Jubilee Medal. She was also awarded with the New Brunswick Medical Society's Dr. Donald Morgan Service Award, and has been appointed to multiple positions including a Manitoba Centre for Health Policy associate, a University of New Brunswick adjunct professor, and as a Faculty of Medicine assistant professor at the University of Manitoba. In October 2015, Cleary received the Paul Harris Fellowship from one of Fredericton's three Rotary Clubs. In 2023, she further received the Queen Elizabeth II Platinum Jubilee Medal.

Not long after her termination, Cleary received the President's Award from the Public Health Physicians of Canada, who recognized her for "outstanding contribution to public health and preventive medicine".

== Personal life and death ==
Cleary married Gerard Beirne in 1989 and later divorced in 2015; they had four children, including writer Luke Francis Beirne. She later lived in Penniac with her partner, Paul Meyer. On March 22, 2024, Cleary died from ovarian cancer in Fredericton, New Brunswick, at the age of 60. Her funeral took place in Fredericton; she was cremated and her ashes were sent back to Ireland.

Brunswick News stated that Cleary left "a sterling legacy in Canada, the province and the global public health community." Diane Peters of The Globe and Mail described Cleary a "fearless defender of public health". Her obituary in The Irish Times labelled her a "champion of public health and fearless environmental health advocate". Coon described Cleary as having been "a woman of intense courage and a moral compass that was unshakable". Irish poet Paula Meehan wrote an elegy in memory of Cleary, titled An Eagle Feather, which was set to music and performed at Dublin's National Concert Hall in April 2025 by the Evlana Ensemble—a group founded by composer and sister to Cleary, Siobhán.
