= Atlantic Bubble =

2020 COVID-19 travel restrictions

- Category: Special travel-restricted area
- Location: New Brunswick; Prince Edward Island; Nova Scotia; Newfoundland and Labrador
- Created: July 3-November 26, 2020 June 23, 2021-October 1, 2022
- Populations: 2,441,141 (2020 Q4 estimate)
- Government: New Brunswick Premier Blaine Higgs Prince Edward Island Premier Dennis King Nova Scotia Premier Stephen McNeil (July 3, 2020-February 23, 2021) Premier Iain Rankin (February 23, 2021-August 31, 2021) Premier Tim Houston (August 31, 2021-present) Newfoundland and Labrador Premier Dwight Ball (July 3-August 19, 2020) Premier Andrew Furey (August 19, 2020-present)

The Atlantic Bubble (French: Bulle de déplacement des provinces de l'Atlantique) was a special travel-restricted area created on July 3, 2020, during the COVID-19 pandemic in Canada. The area was an agreement between the four Atlantic Canadian provinces of New Brunswick, Prince Edward Island, Nova Scotia, and Newfoundland and Labrador which allowed unrestricted travel among provincial residents and restricted travel from Canadians who were residents of outside provinces. Residents wishing to travel to the Atlantic Bubble were subjected to screening and were required to quarantine for 14 days before moving freely throughout the bubble. Individual provinces had specific rules toward travellers from outside of Atlantic Canada. The provinces in the bubble saw the lowest numbers of COVID-19 compared to other Canadian provinces throughout the pandemic.

The area was suspended on November 26, 2020, due to a second wave of COVID-19 cases across Canada. The Council of Atlantic Premiers confirmed the bubble would resume April 19, 2021, but later postponed the date to May 3, 2021, due to an increase in cases due to the third wave of the virus. Following a travel ban on outside travellers in PEI and Nova Scotia, the reopening date was postponed indefinitely. In late May 2021, plans for the reopening of the bubble were announced by some of the provinces, with various possible reopening dates. However, each province had their own reopening plans which included allowing travel from outside the Atlantic region and no consensus was reached between the four provinces.

Following mass-vaccinations across the country, the Atlantic Bubble had a reiteration in June 2021. Free travel was reopened between the provinces generally speaking, with the exception of Prince Edward Island, who required at least partial vaccination (one-dose) to enter the province. Each province had their own rules on outside travellers from other provinces in Canada - fully vaccinated travellers (both-doses) were allowed to enter each province freely without quarantine. This system continued until COVID-19 restrictions were lifted in Canada on October 1st 2022.

== History ==
The Atlantic Bubble was first conceived to encourage economic strength and fluidity amongst the Atlantic provinces due to the economic impact of the COVID-19 pandemic in Canada. Initially, the Atlantic Provinces had interprovincial travel restrictions, to prevent the spread of COVID-19. On June 24, 2020, it was announced that the four premiers of the Atlantic Canadian provinces had come to an agreement of creating a free-travel bubble, effective July 3, 2020 amongst the provinces.

On November 23, Newfoundland and Labrador and Prince Edward Island announced plans to suspend involvement in the bubble effective November 24. Travellers from other Atlantic provinces would be required to self-isolate upon entry, thus restricting the bubble to just New Brunswick and Nova Scotia. On November 26, New Brunswick joined PEI and Newfoundland and Labrador in imposing a 14-day self-isolation requirement on out-of-province travellers, thus ending any free-travel amongst the member provinces. On December 3, Prince Edward Island extended its suspension of involvement in the bubble.

In response, Nova Scotian Premier Stephen McNeil commented that despite the temporary withdrawal of other provinces from the agreement, he called the bubble concept a success for Atlantic Canadians' mental health during the COVID-19 pandemic. Nova Scotians would not have to self-isolate if they return from another Atlantic province, but would face regional self-isolation orders if entering one of the other three provinces.

Premier Furey of Newfoundland and Labrador announced December 7 2020 that the province would suspend involvement in the bubble until at least the beginning of 2021. PEI extended its suspension of its involvement in the bubble until January 11, 2021.

On January 4, 2021, Dr. Jennifer Russell of New Brunswick suggested talks of restarting the bubble would likely resume that month.

On January 9, 2021, due to a spike in cases in New Brunswick, Nova Scotia officially restricted travel from New Brunswickers travelling into the province, requiring a 14-day self isolation (with work and medical exemptions).

On February 10, 2021, similar circumstances in Newfoundland and Labrador prompted Nova Scotia to restrict travel from that province as well, leaving the final remnant of the original Atlantic bubble in place only for travel from Prince Edward Island into Nova Scotia.

Dependant on COVID-19 cases, PEI's Chief Health Office Dr. Heather Morrison hoped for the bubble to reopen around April 1, 2021.

On March 18, 2021, the Council of Atlantic Premiers confirmed the bubble would resume April 19, 2021.

On March 19, 2021, Nova Scotia opened their border with New Brunswick, allowing New Brunswick and PEI residents to freely travel to the province without having to self-isolate.

On April 13, 2021, the Bubble's reopening was delayed until May 3, 2021, due to a resurgence of cases.

During this period, the French territory of Saint Pierre and Miquelon requested to be part of the bubble, although this was unsuccessful.

Following a travel ban on outside travellers by PEI and Nova Scotia, the reopening date of the bubble was postponed indefinitely once again. Nova Scotia Premier Rankin saying that the bubble was "clearly not going to happen".

On May 27, 2021, PEI announced reopening plans for the province and the plan stated that on June 27, 2021, Atlantic Canadians with one dose of the vaccine would be allowed travel freely without a need for a 14-day isolation. However, later that day Premier Blaine Higgs of New Brunswick announced that the bubble would fully reopen on July 1, 2021, to all Atlantic Canadians vaccinated or not. In addition, PEI would open to all travellers from outside Atlantic Canada who were fully vaccinated without the need for self-isolation on August 8, 2021.

Newfoundland and Labrador suspended their part in the Atlantic Bubble on September 30, 2021, due to an increase in cases in the Atlantic Region, as well as their own change in epidemiology. Health officials also announced new travel restrictions for those with one dose of a Health Canada approved COVID-19 vaccine. Partially vaccinated travellers were to have the same restrictions as unvaccinated travellers, and would have to isolate for two weeks. However, those who were partially vaccinated could request to be tested for COVID-19 on days 7 through 9 of their isolation.

== Rules ==
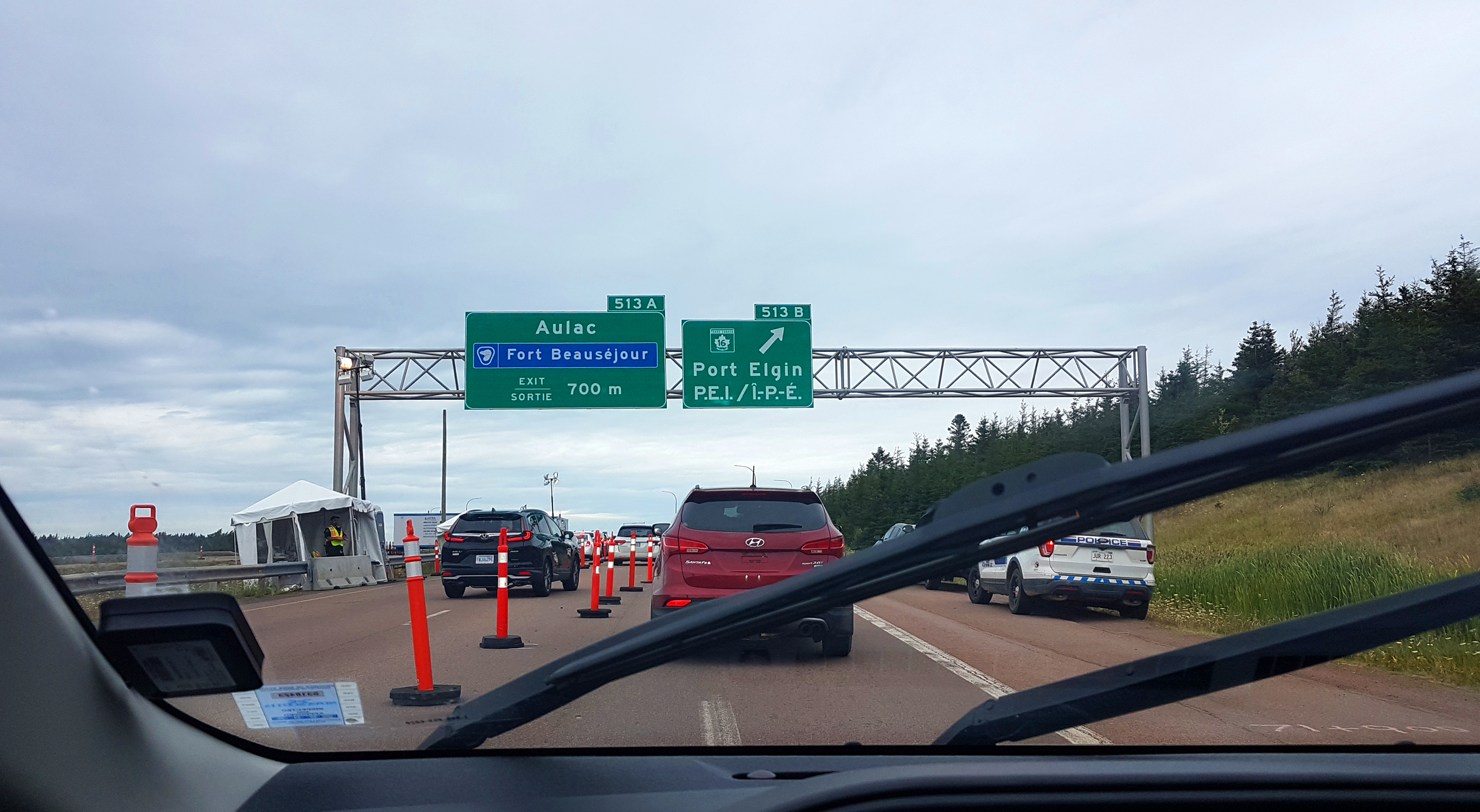
Traveling inside the Atlantic Bubble: a New Brunswick checkpoint on the Trans-Canada Highway, when entering from Nova Scotia in August 2020.

At the beginning of the pandemic, peace officers restricted movement between provinces in the Atlantic region. After the agreement to begin the bubble, officers stayed on the border and checked identification for those travelling between provinces. Residents of each of the four provinces are allowed to travel freely amongst member provinces. Travellers from outside of the member provinces were asked to provide proof of plans to quarantine for 14 days. They were also screened for COVID-19 symptoms. New Brunswick, which borders Quebec was the only province with a land border to restrict vehicular traffic. Each province had different rules for entering the province for travellers from outside the Atlantic Bubble. Air travellers were screened for COVID-19 and asked for proof of plans to quarantine for 14 days.

=== Prince Edward Island ===
Prince Edward Island had more stringent restrictions than the other provinces and required advance written approval from the government for travellers from outside of the Atlantic Bubble. The island province established the PEI Pass which required travellers from outside the province to apply for a special travel visa to enter the province. Travellers from outside Atlantic Canada had to be fully vaccinated with a Health Canada approved vaccine in order to be exempt from quarantine.

== Incidents ==
=== 2020 ===
- July 6: A truck driver in Georgetown, Prince Edward Island was fined for failing to self isolate after travelling outside of the Atlantic Bubble.
- September 4–7: Four students were fined by RCMP in Antigonish and Wolfville in Nova Scotia for failure to self-isolate.
- September 10: A student was fined in Wolfville, Nova Scotia for breaking quarantine.
- September 21: A man from North Rustico, PEI was fined for failure to self-isolate.
- October 1: A man who travelled from Central Africa died from COVID-19 while in self-isolation in Newfoundland and Labrador. The man was asymptomatic while travelling from Central Africa to Toronto, and then Toronto to Halifax and Halifax to Deer Lake on September 30.
- October 23: A man from Kentville, Nova Scotia was fined for failing to self isolate after travelling outside the Atlantic Bubble.
- November 2: WestJet suspended all flights to the Atlantic provinces, citing lack of interest, due in part to the member province's disinterest in travel outside of the bubble.
- December 8: Air Canada announced the suspension of many domestic flights in the Atlantic Canada region effective January 11, 2021, citing lack of interest due to government enforced self-isolation times.

=== 2021 ===
- April 20: Five people from Ontario were charged in Summerside, PEI for failing to self-isolate after their vehicle was spotted at a Wal-Mart less than one hour after they entered the province.
- May 19: An Ontario man attempting to travel illegally to Newfoundland was arrested for drunk driving in Cape Breton, Nova Scotia.

== Reception ==
A poll found 81% of Atlantic Canadians in favour of the Atlantic Bubble.

== Criticism ==
Critics called into question the constitutionality of the Atlantic Bubble. According to Section 6 of the Canadian Charter of Rights and Freedoms:

(2) Every citizen of Canada and every person who has the status of a permanent resident of Canada has the right

a) to move to and take up residence in any province; and

b) to pursue the gaining of a livelihood in any province. — Canadian Charter of Rights and Freedoms, Section 6

Therefore, detractors of the bubble suggested that the concept of the bubble impeded the rights of Canadian citizens and permanent residents.

In September 2020, the Supreme Court of Newfoundland and Labrador ruled that, while existing travel restrictions did violate Section 6 of the Charter, the violation was permitted under Section 1, which allows "limits [on Charter rights]... as can be demonstrably justified in a free and democratic society." The Canadian Civil Liberties Association tried unsuccessfully to repeal the decision.

In May 2021, the Canadian Civil Liberties Association once again challenged travel restrictions, but this time in Nova Scotia. The association claimed unconstitutionality as the travel restrictions interfere with 'travel freedom' in the Canadian Charter of Rights and Freedoms. The attempt was unsuccessful.

== See also ==
- COVID-19 pandemic in New Brunswick
- COVID-19 pandemic in Prince Edward Island
- COVID-19 pandemic in Nova Scotia
- COVID-19 pandemic in Newfoundland and Labrador
- Baltic Bubble
- Zero-COVID
