= Gerard Beirne =

Irish author

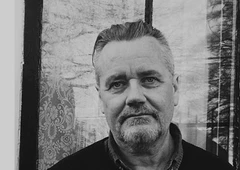
- Born: October 30, 1962 (age 63); County Tipperary, Ireland
- Citizenship: Irish, Canadian
- Education: Trinity College, Dublin
- Spouse: Eilish Cleary (m. 1989; div. 2015)
- Children: 4, including Luke Francis Beirne
- Writing career
- Notable awards: Sunday Tribune New Irish Writer of the Year, 1996

Gerard Beirne is an Irish author and literary editor. He is a fiction editor for The Fiddlehead and curates the online magazine The Irish Literary Times.

In 2008, Beirne served as Writer in Residence at the University of New Brunswick, where he taught creative writing. Beirne currently teaches on the BA Writing and Literature Program at the Atlantic Technological University in Sligo.

== Awards and honours ==
In 1996, Beirne was awarded two Hennessey Literary Awards, "New Irish Writer of the Year" and "Best Emerging Fiction Writer". His debut novel The Eskimo in the Net was short-listed for the 2004 Kerry Group Irish Fiction Award and was selected as Book of the Year by the Daily Express. In 1997, Digging My Own Grave was runner-up for the Patrick Kavanagh Poetry Award. In 2000, Bono starred in a short film adaptation of Beirne's story "Sightings of Bono." Beirne's collaboration with composer Siobhán Cleary, Hum, was called "a theatrical tour de force" by The Irish Times. Beirne's first short story collection, In a Time of Drought and Hunger was shortlisted for the 2016 Danuta Gleed Literary Award. That same year, he was shortlisted for the Bord Gáis Energy Irish Book Awards for his short story "What a River Remembers of its Course."

== Selected works ==
=== Novels ===
- The Eskimo in the Net. London: Marion Boyars, 2003.
- Turtle. Ottawa: Oberon, 2009.
- Charlie Tallulah. Ottawa: Oberon, 2013.
- The Thickness of Ice. Montreal: Baraka Books, 2024.

=== Short story collections ===
- In a Time of Drought and Hunger. Ottawa: Oberon, 2015.

=== Poetry ===
- Digging My Own Grave. Dublin: Dedalus, 1997.
- Games of Chance: A Gambler's Manual. Ottawa: Oberon, 2011.
- The Death Poems: Songs, Visions, Meditations. Cromer: Salt Publishing, 2023.

=== Theatre and film ===
- Hum! with Siobhán Cleary. Commissioned by Irish Chamber Orchestra 1998. Revived by the RTÉ National Symphony Orchestra in 2020.
- Sightings of Bono. Parallel Productions, 2000. Starring Bono.
