= COVID-19 pandemic in Prince Edward Island =

Ongoing COVID-19 viral pandemic in Prince Edward Island, Canada

- Disease: COVID-19
- Pathogen: SARS-CoV-2
- First outbreak: Wuhan, Hubei, China
- Index case: Queens County
- Arrival date: March 14, 2020 (6 years, 4 months, 3 weeks and 4 days)
- Confirmed cases: 52,047
- Active cases: 320 - As of 6 October 2022
- Hospitalized cases: 289 (to date)
- Recovered: 51,665
- Deaths: 62
- Fatality rate: 0.11%

Government website
- PEIs COVID-19 Testing and Case Data

The COVID-19 pandemic in Prince Edward Island is part of an ongoing global pandemic of coronavirus disease 2019 (COVID-19), an infectious disease caused by severe acute respiratory syndrome coronavirus 2 (SARS-CoV-2). Up until January 14, 2022, Prince Edward Island was the only province/territory that did not have any deaths due to COVID-19.

On March 14, 2020, the first confirmed case in Prince Edward Island was announced, a woman in her 50s who had returned from a trip on a cruise ship on March 7.

An initial small surge in cases at the start of 2020 eventually petered out to zero active cases by May 2020. The province began to open up that summer, resulting in another small uptick in active cases, with no deaths. By the close of 2020, PEI withdrew from the Atlantic Bubble and eased some restrictions, resulting in a slow but steady rise in active cases. By May 2021, the island recorded its 200th confirmed case of infection. In December 2021, PEI was breaking its own daily records of confirmed infections, with active cases surpassing the 1000 mark by early January 2022. No Islanders had yet lost their lives to the pandemic and PEI remained the only Canadian province with no known COVID-19 fatalities. However, on January 14, 2022, the first deaths related to COVID-19 in Prince Edward Island were reported, with fatalities rising sharply throughout the year. Despite the rising fatality rate, many health restrictions were abandoned in favor of bolstering the local economy. By the start of the 2022 tourist season, masking, social distancing, testing mandates and vaccine passports were eliminated.

As of October 4, 2022, Prince Edward Island has reported 52,047 confirmed cases of the virus and 62 deaths.

== Timeline: Infections, Deaths & Government Response ==
=== February 2020 ===
- February 28 - The first COVID-19 related update is issued by the PEI government. There are no known cases on the island, but officials encourage individuals returning from Hubei Province, China to voluntarily self-isolate for 14 days. All other international travelers are encouraged to monitor themselves closely.

=== March 2020 ===
- March 10 - In response to the emerging COVID-19 threat, the Department of Education and Lifelong Learning announces that for the month of March, all school-planned travel abroad has been cancelled.
- March 11 - The province launches a toll-free COVID-19 information line. Islanders are encouraged to leave a message with their questions and concerns, which will be answered with a call back within 24 hours by a staff member from the Chief Public Health Office.
- March 13
  - Dr. Heather Morrison issues new travel recommendations; all international travelers are supposed to isolate for 14 days, without regard to point of origin, symptoms or possible contact with the infected. Islanders are encouraged to cancel all trips abroad and to avoid large gatherings.
  - Premier Dennis King issues a statement regarding his recent travel to the USA; he will be taking Dr. Heather Morrisons recommendations to heart and self isolating for 14 days. He does not believe that either he or his family were exposed to COVID during the trip. His statement also confirms that he will be cancelling any previously planned international trips.
- March 14 - The first confirmed case of COVID-19 in Prince Edward Island is announced. The index case is a resident of Queens County; a woman in her 50s who returned from a trip on a cruise ship on March 7. The person had travelled on WestJet Flight 3440 from Toronto to Moncton on March 7.
- March 15
  - Three special cabinet committees are established as part of government's response efforts to address the economic impacts of COVID-19 in the province. The three committees that are announced: (1) Economy and Business Supports, (2) Labour and Social Supports, and (3) Government Operations.
  - New preventative measures are announced by Dr. Heather Morrison. As of today, all public and private long-term care and community care facilities will be restricting visitors. Anyone, including children, who have travelled outside the country are asked to avoid child care facilities. Health PEI prepares to shift to providing essential services only.
- March 16
  - Premier Dennis King announces that the provincial cabinet has declared a state of public health emergency under the Public Health Act. The emergency declaration gives special powers to the Chief Public Health Officer of the province, who will be able to issue orders about self isolation, closures and gatherings.
  - The Premier announces that Cabinet has established a $25 million contingency fund in response to the economic upheaval.
  - All library programs and events Island-wide are cancelled.
- March 17
  - All public licensed child care centres are closed. All public schools are closed for two weeks following March Break (March 23 to April 3). Mark Arendz Provincial Ski Park at Brookvale closes. All provincially run visitor information centres also close today.
  - The following gathering places close: bars, in-room dining at restaurants (pick-up, delivery and drive-thru remain options for the businesses), theatres (including movie theatres), and indoor play areas. All dental clinics and optometry appointments are cancelled.
  - It is recommended that funerals be cancelled or rescheduled. Wakes at funeral homes will have gathering limits.
  - Investments to support the Island's most vulnerable are announced, including: $250,000 to United Way Prince Edward Island to support the Atlantic Compassion Fund; $100,000 to the Prince Edward Island Food Bank Association; $100,000 to Salvation Army Prince Edward Island; and $50,000 for community programs and NGOs.
  - PEI Housing Corporation suspends all evictions for six weeks.
  - Minister of Economic Growth and Tourism announces: Emergency Income Relief for the self-employed; and support for small businesses.
  - All Access PEI offices, the Provincial Administration Building in Charlottetown and Island Waste Management Corporation are closed to the public.
- March 18
  - The Canadian Broadcast Corporation (CBC) temporarily suspends local news broadcasts, including Prince Edward Island's CBC News: Compass. The aim is to consolidate all COVID-19 reporting and protect staff. There is an outcry across the country in protest of this move, including a statement from Premier Dennis King, expressing his disappointment.
  - More financial support for Islanders is announced by the provincial government, including: loan deferrals, small business supports and extra financial supports for people whose hours have been significantly cut.
  - During a news conference, Dr. Heather Morrison announces the immediate closing of all personal beauty care providers, including barbers, hairdressers, and nail and tattoo salons. This decision is made with the input of the Hairdressers Association. It is also announced that at 2 pm the following day (March 19), all 17 liquor stores and all cannabis stores throughout Prince Edward Island will close. This causes a buying spree of both liquor and cannabis.
- March 19
  - PEI closes its liquor and cannabis stores.
  - Prince Edward Island police agencies announce the suspension of the following services: elective fingerprinting, criminal records checks and vulnerable sector checks.
- March 20 - The second confirmed case of COVID-19 infection in Prince Edward Island is identified. The person is male and was on Air Canada flight 7564 which travelled from Toronto to Charlottetown on March 11.
- March 21 - All new arrivals to PEI (international AND inter-provincial) are asked to self-isolate for two weeks. Screening of all travelers begins at the Charlottetown Airport, Confederation Bridge, and the ferry terminal for the Magdalen Islands service from Souris.
- March 22 - The third confirmed case of COVID-19 infection in Prince Edward Island is identified. The individual is a woman in her 20s from Queen's County who recently returned from international travel. She flew from Spain to Toronto on March 14, then flew to Moncton on March 16 on WestJet flight 3456 and then traveled by car to Prince Edward Island that same day.
- March 23 - In response to the confirmed cases of COVID-19 found on the Island, Cabinet empowers the Chief Public Health Officer to issue fines to anyone who is not complying with an order to self-isolate. The penalties for not complying include: A fine of $1,000 for a first offence; A fine of $2,000 for a second offence; A fine of $10,000 for a third offence and every offence thereafter.
- March 24 - In partnership with Sobeys Inc., the province launches a program to get $100 grocery gift cards to Islanders who have been laid off.
- March 25 - Due to concerns that closing liquor stores could impact people with alcohol withdrawal syndrome, the province re-opens one liquor store in Charlottetown, with the aim of slowly re-opening them all.
- March 26 - Four new cases of COVID-19 infection are confirmed in Prince Edward Island, bringing the total up to nine. The cases are all men between the ages of 55 and 70, who recently returned from international travel. Two of the men returned from Europe, one from the United States and one from the Caribbean. Two of the men are from Queens County and two are from Prince County.
- March 27
  - Two new cases of COVID-19 infection are confirmed in Prince Edward Island, bringing the total up to 11. The cases are two women, one in her 20s and the other in her 50s. Both are from Prince County and the cases are related to international travel.
  - Closure of schools, daycares and non-essential services is extended. Schools and daycares will remain closed until at least May 11. Non-essential government services and non-essential businesses will remain closed indefinitely.
- March 28 - Established by Health PEI, Charlottetown Cough and Fever Clinic opens.
- March 30
  - Established by Health PEI, Summerside Cough and Fever Clinic opens.
  - Seven new cases of COVID-19 infection are confirmed in Prince Edward Island, bringing the total up to 18. Three of the people are women, and four are men, with ages ranging from in their 20s to in their 70s. All cases are related to international travel.
  - It is revealed that as of March 30, the Chief Public Health Office received 56 complaints about people failing to self-isolate upon return from travel outside the province. 26 resulted in a visit from an officer, 12 ended in verbal warnings to self-isolate and nine resulted in a written warning for violating the Public Health Order.
  - Minister of Social Development and Housing announces a $1,000,000 Temporary Rental Assistance Benefit. In addition, the Prince Edward Island Housing Corporation will extend its moratorium on evictions to the end of June. Minister of Economic Growth, Tourism and Culture announces a Commercial Lease Rent Deferral Program for small and medium businesses.
- March 31 - Three new cases of COVID-19 infection are confirmed, bringing the total up to 21. One is a male in his 20s, and the other two are females, one in her 30s and one in her 40s; all new cases are related to international travel.

=== April 2020 ===
- April 1 - PEI government announces more financial support for Islanders, including the COVID-19 Income Support Program.
- April 2
  - One new case of COVID-19 infection is confirmed, bringing the total up to 22. The individual is a man in his 50s from the Queens County area; the case is related to international travel.
  - Minister of Transportation, Infrastructure and Energy announces the COVID-19 Special Situations Fund.
- April 8 - Three new case of COVID-19 infection are confirmed, bringing the total up to 25. Two of the cases are linked directly to international travel; a man in his 20s and a woman in her 70s. The other is the first case of inter-provincial infection in PEI; a man in his 50s. Of the 25 known positive cases on PEI, 17 are considered recovered, leaving only 8 active cases at this time.
- April 9
  - Agriculture and Land Minister announces a COVID-19 Strategic Fund for Agriculture.
  - Minister of Transportation, Infrastructure and Energy announces a program making rooms available for truck drivers for self-isolation between trips at a much reduced rate.
  - The provincial recreational fishing season is delayed until June 1.
  - There is an indefinite moratorium on burning across the province.
- April 11 - Island Producers Helping Islanders event takes place. ADL (Amalgamated Dairies Limited), the PEI Potato Board and provincial government coordinate to hand out free care packages to Islanders during the Easter weekend. The packages include local dairy products and potatoes. They are distributed at locations in Summerside and Charlottetown.
- April 13–23 of the province's 25 COVID-19 cases have now recovered; no new infections have been found. This leaves only two active infections.
- April 15 - One new case of COVID-19 infection is confirmed, bringing the cumulative total to 26 on the Island, with 23 recovered and three active cases. It is a man in his 30s, from Queens County, who returned from international travel.
- April 16
  - The State of Emergency, which was originally declared on March 16, is extended an additional 30 days.
  - Minister of Economic Growth, Tourism and Culture announced a new $50 million fund to provide loans to businesses dependant on tourism.
- April 18 - Island Producers Helping Islanders initiative is extended and occurs again today, with expanded locations; Elmsdale, North Wiltshire and Cardigan.
- April 21 - Provincial government suggests that public health restrictions can begin to be lifted in phases as early as May 1.
- April 22 - As of today, 24 of the 26 confirmed COVID-19 infections are considered recovered, leaving only 2 active cases on the Island. PEI's rate of COVID-19 cases per 100,000 people is 19. All cases have been related to travel outside the province.
- April 23 - The Province of Prince Edward Island is working on providing funding towards shipping and storage costs of potatoes; this will help mitigate the potato surplus caused by the pandemic.
- April 28 - Renew PEI, Together phased reopening plan is announced. The first phase will begin Friday, May 1.

=== May 2020 ===
- May 5
  - In order to support the agriculture industry on the Island during the pandemic, new programs and changes to existing ones are announced.
  - A new Loving Local campaign is announced, focusing on local businesses, producers and ingredients in an effort to bolster the Island economy during the pandemic. It will launch May 22, 2020.
- May 7
  - The Minister of Finance announces a $16.7 million COVID-19 Incentive to Support Essential Workers.
  - Minister of Fisheries and Communities announces two new programs designed to assist fisheries and aquaculture operators.
  - Minister of Economic Growth, Tourism and Culture announces the COVID-19 Workspace Adaption Assistance Fund to help small businesses purchase and install protective measures.
- May 8
  - The last remaining COVID-19 case is classified as recovered, leaving zero active COVID-19 infections in Prince Edward Island.
  - Some restrictions are lifted today, including the following: (1) Members of the same household may gather indoors with up to 5 other individuals from different households. (2) Members of the same household may gather outdoors with up to 10 other individuals from different households. (3) Maintaining physical distancing is important during any gatherings with those from outside your household. (4) You may extend your household unit by one or two members, who are important to supporting your household or who you feel may need closer contact and support.
- May 12 - Access PEI reopens and begins operating with limited and modified services.
- May 15
  - Northumberland Ferries resumes service between Prince Edward Island and Nova Scotia for commercial vehicles.
  - After a two-week delay, the Island lobster season begins. The delay is caused by the need to quarantine off-island workers.
- May 22
  - Phase 2 of Renew PEI, Together begins.
  - In an effort to keep person-to-person contact low, Island property owners can now apply for domestic burning permits online rather than driving to the nearest Forests, Fish and Wildlife office.

=== June 2020 ===
- June 1
  - Phase three of Renew PEI, Together begins, with many health restrictions lifted.
  - Seasonal residents may apply to visit Prince Edward Island this summer, which will require a self-isolation plan.
- June 11 - PEI premier Dennis King suggests that travel between provinces in the Atlantic region might be allowed as early as the start of July. King claims there was an agreement to this end, in a discussion held on June 10 between the Premiers. When asked by the CBC, the other Premiers expressed caution on an Atlantic bubble.
- June 26 - Phase four of Renew PEI, Together begins, with many pandemic restrictions lifted.

=== July 2020 ===
- July 3 - PEI joins three other Atlantic provinces (Newfoundland and Labrador, New Brunswick and Nova Scotia) in lifting travel restrictions among them, to form the Atlantic bubble, allowing residents within the four Atlantic provinces to travel without self-isolating for 14 days.
- July 4 - Three new cases of COVID-19 infection are announced, the first new cases detected since April. The total active cases on the Island is now three.
- July 5 - Two new cases of COVID-19 infection are reported, bringing the total of active cases to five.
- July 9 - One new case of COVID-19 infection is reported, bringing the total up to six.
- July 29 - The Canadian Premier League announces that it will play a shortened 2020 season known as "The Island Games" at the University of Prince Edward Island, with all participants required to undergo self-isolation and testing before being allowed to travel and play.

=== August 2020 ===
- August 5 - PEI government announces that all public schools will go back to full time, in-class learning on September 8.
- August 12 - Five new COVID-19 cases are detected among men from a single flight (Air Canada flight AC8360), who had all traveled outside the country. This brings the total active cases up to 11.
- August 18
  - Three new COVID-19 cases are reported, all among men traveling from outside the country on the same flight (Air Canada flight AC626). This brings the total active cases up to 14.
  - Cohort and gathering limit numbers are significantly increased by the Island government.

=== September 2020 ===
- September 3 - Two new COVID-19 cases are confirmed. As of this date, PEI government states that there have been a total of 46 positive cases on the island. So far, all known positive cases have been travel-related.
- September 4 - One new COVID-19 case is confirmed; it is related to international travel. As of this date, PEI government states that there have been a total of 47 positive cases on the island.
- September 7 - Four new COVID-19 cases are detected. These cases include two young children under the age of 10. All cases are related to international travel. As of this date, PEI government states that there have been a total of 51 positive cases on the island.
- September 8
  - Two new COVID-19 cases are detected. Both cases are related to international travel. As of this date, PEI government states that there have been a total of 53 positive cases on the island.
  - The province opens five new drop-in testing sites where appointments are not needed. The new sites are in Charlottetown, Summerside, Montague, Borden and O'Leary. These sites will operate in addition to the appointment-needed sites already available.
- September 9 - Two new COVID-19 cases are detected, both people traveled internationally. As of this date, PEI government states that there have been a total of 55 positive cases on the island. There is currently no evidence of community spread of the virus.
- September 19 - The New Normal plan is released to the public; it aims to gradually lift health restrictions.
- September 22 - Although the Atlantic Bubble still exists in theory, rotational workers (those who are required to work both inside and outside of Atlantic Canada on a rotation) no longer have to self-isolate or work-isolate. Implementing health restrictions for this population now falls to the workers themselves and their employers.
- September 23 - One new COVID-19 case is detected; it is related to international travel. As of this date, PEI government states that there have been a total of 58 positive cases on the island.
- September 25 - It is announced that the COVID-19 clinic at the Eastlink Centre will be moving to 64 Park Street.

=== November 2020 ===
- November 23 - Premier King announces that Prince Edward Island is withdrawing from the Atlantic Bubble for a two-week period.

=== December 2020 ===
- December 3 - The withdrawal from the Atlantic Bubble is extended until at least December 21, 2020.

=== February 2021 ===
- February 26–27 - Two new cases are identified with another three new cases the next day, showing evidence of community spread. A full lockdown had been placed after 11 new cases over the weekend.

=== May 2021 ===
- May 21 - The 200th confirmed case of COVID-19 is confirmed in PEI.

=== June 2021 ===
- June 16 - Wayne Easter and Premier King announce upgrades to four education and active transportation infrastructure projects
- June 21 - It is announced that residents of PEI do not need to upload information of vaccination for the PEI pass.

Cases remained relatively low throughout the Summer and Fall months. However, in late-December 2021, Prince Edward Island (P.E.I.) began to experience a surge in COVID-19 cases, primarily caused by the SARS-CoV-2 Omicron variant. Prince Edward Island's caseload quickly accelerated, and the province surpassed 1,000 confirmed cases on December 29, 2021, when health officials reported 129 new cases; a record-breaking, single-day increase in cases. This record was broken again on December 30, 2021, when officials reported 169 new cases, and on December 31, 2021, with 175 new cases.

=== January 2022 ===
- January 2 - Officials report 137 new COVID-19 cases since the last update on December 31, 2021.
- January 3 - Officials report 161 new cases. The province's active caseload stands at 995.
- January 4 - Another record-breaking, single-day increase in cases is reported, with 198 new cases. The province surpasses 1,000 active cases, with 1,159 active province-wide.
- January 5 - Premier Dennis King and Chief Medical Officer of Health Dr.Heather Morrison announce 222 new COVID-19 cases; smashing all previous-set records days before. The active caseload is at an all-time high, with officials reporting 1,378 active cases. There are three people in hospital due to COVID-19, including one in intensive care.
- January 14
  - Dr. Heather Morrison announces that Prince Edward Island is reporting its first two deaths related to COVID-19. One individual was between the ages of 60 and 79 years of age, and the other individual was over the age of 79 years.
  - Government of PEI reports 1,994 active cases, with a total of 3,861 since the start of the pandemic.
  - Ongoing outbreaks are reported at Provincial Correctional Centre, Atlantic Baptist Long Term Care Facility, Garden Home Long Term Care Facility and Miscouche Villa Community Care Facility. There are outbreaks at 14 Early Learning and Child Care Centres. There is an outbreak among individuals who regularly access shelters and outreach services in Charlottetown, with nine cases.
- January 19 - The province reports its third death due to COVID-19, as well as 304 new COVID-19 cases. There are now ten people in hospital; a new high for Prince Edward Island.
- January 29
  - One new death due to COVID-19 is confirmed, bringing the total to four; the individual was 80 or over.
  - There are 2,430 active cases, with a total of 7,545 confirmed cases of COVID-19 since the start of the pandemic.
  - The following locations are reporting active outbreaks. Long Term Care Facilities: Andrews of Park West, Atlantic Baptist, Beach, Grove Home, Clinton View Lodge, Garden Home, South Shore Villa, Summerset Manor. Community Care Facilities: Bevan Lodge. Early Learning and Child Care Centres: 23 centres with cases of COVID-19, 7 centres open, 4 centres closed, 12 centres operating at a modified or reduced capacity. Hospitals: Prince County Hospital. Other congregate settings: Population that accesses shelter and outreach services in Charlottetown, Prince County Correctional Centre, Provincial Addictions Treatment Facility, Provincial Correctional Centre, St. Eleanor's House.

=== February 2022 ===
- February 23 - Dr. Morrison announces a record-breaking 526 new COVID-19 cases. Premier King announces that Prince Edward Island's vaccine system will be terminated on February 28, 2022.

=== May 2022 ===
- May 10
  - Six new deaths due to COVID-19 are reported, bringing the total up to 32. Three of the individuals were older than 80 and three were older than 60.
  - There is a new outbreak at Western Hospital in Alberton.
  - The following long-term care or community care facilities are listed with ongoing outbreaks: Atlantic Baptist, Beach Grove Home, Gillis Lodge, Maplewood Manor, The Mews, Miscouche Villa, Tignish Seniors Home, Wedgewood Manor, Whisperwood Villa
- May 17
  - The 33rd island death is reported. The individual was between 60 and 79 years old.
  - There are 1,139 active cases.
- May 20 - It is announced that children, students and staff are no longer required to perform at-home antigen screening tests before attending school or childcare.
- May 24
  - Masks are no longer required for students and staff in early learning and childcare centres, K-12 public and private schools and on school buses.
  - The following COVID-19 outbreaks have been declared over: Unit 2 (Medical/Surgical Unit) of the Queen Elizabeth Hospital and at Wedgewood Manor in Summerside.
  - There are 743 active cases.
  - There have been a total of 37,578 COVID-19 cases to date.
