= Luke Francis Beirne =

Irish-Canadian author (born 1995)

- Born: 21 September 1995 (age 30); Ireland
- Occupation: Writer
- Parent(s): Gerard Beirne; Eilish Cleary

Luke Francis Beirne (born 21 September 1995) is an Irish-Canadian writer. Beirne was born in Ireland but moved to Canada at a young age. He now lives in Saint John, New Brunswick. He is the son of author Gerard Beirne and Dr. Eilish Cleary.

Beirne's first novel, Foxhunt, was a finalist for the 2022 Foreword INDIES award in General Fiction and chosen by The Miramichi Reader as one of the best novels of 2022. Blacklion was shortlisted for the New Brunswick Book Awards and was selected by CBC as one of the best books of Fall 2023.

Beirne's writing has been compared to authors such as Graham Greene, Ernest Hemingway, and John le Carre.

== Novels ==
- Saints Rest. Baraka Books, 2025. ISBN 9781771863797
- Blacklion. Baraka Books, 2023. ISBN 9781927886250
- Foxhunt. Baraka Books, 2022. ISBN 9781771863315

== Selected Journalism and Essays ==
- "The Center of the Ring: On Writing About Boxing," Counterpunch, 2023.
- "The Liberal Aversion to Conflict," Counterpunch, 2022.
- "Canons of the Cold War: The Weaponization of Literature," Counterpunch, 2022.
- "Apocalypse Now," Libcom.org, 2022.
- "Garden of Earthly Bodies," Strange Horizons, 2022.
- "Surrealism: A Radical Experiential Reality," The Commoner, 2022.
- "Canons of Cold War," Counterpunch, 2022.
- "Ireland's New Drive to Join NATO," Counterpunch, 2022.
- "The Power and Rôle of the Idea: de Cleyre and Bourdieu," The Commoner, 2022.
- "The Stormont Election and Ireland," Counterpunch, 2022.
- "Katie Taylor and Amanda Serrano Make History," Counterpunch, 2022.
- "The Canadian Spy Novelist Ordered to Reveal his Sources," CrimeReads, 2022.
- "Echoes of Cold War II," NB Media Co-op, 2022.
- "Against Imperialism II," Counterpunch, 2022.
- "Against Imperialism," Counterpunch, 2022.
- "Terminal Boredom by Izumi Suzuki," Strange Horizons, 2022.
- "Echoes of Cold War," NB Media Co-op, 2022.
- "The War in Afghanistan and Canadian Media Propaganda," Counterpunch, 2022.
- "In the Eyes of the Jackal," The Fight City, 2022.
