= Baltic Bubble =

Travel-restricted area in Baltic states during COVID-19

The Baltic Bubble was a special travel-restricted area consisting of the Baltic states Estonia, Latvia and Lithuania created on May 15, 2020, during the COVID-19 pandemic in Europe. It was the first travel bubble in Europe and in the European Union since COVID-19 restrictions were first implemented. The creation of the Baltic Bubble was announced by the prime ministers of the three states on April 29, 2020. It allowed citizens of the states to travel across the borders of the states without needing to self-isolate unless the citizens had travelled outside of the area within the previous 14 days.

The Baltic Bubble was suspended on November 11, 2020, when Latvia restricted entry conditions for people coming from Estonia due to an increase in COVID-19 cases.

On April 28, 2021, Estonia Foreign Minister Eva-Maria Liimets announced that the Baltic Bubble could be restored in the summer of 2021, allowing for the facilitation of travel between the states again. On April 29, 2021, Lithuania Prime Minister Ingrida Šimonytė questioned the need for a Baltic Bubble because a European Union Green Pass was already in development at the time that would allow for people to freely travel across the entire EU. On May 28, 2021, the Lithuanian Economy and Innovation Ministry announced that the three Baltic states were planning on reintroducing the Baltic Bubble.

== See also ==
- Zero-COVID
- Travel restrictions related to the COVID-19 pandemic
- Atlantic Bubble
