= Lorcan Morris =

Irish professional golf caddie (born 1981)

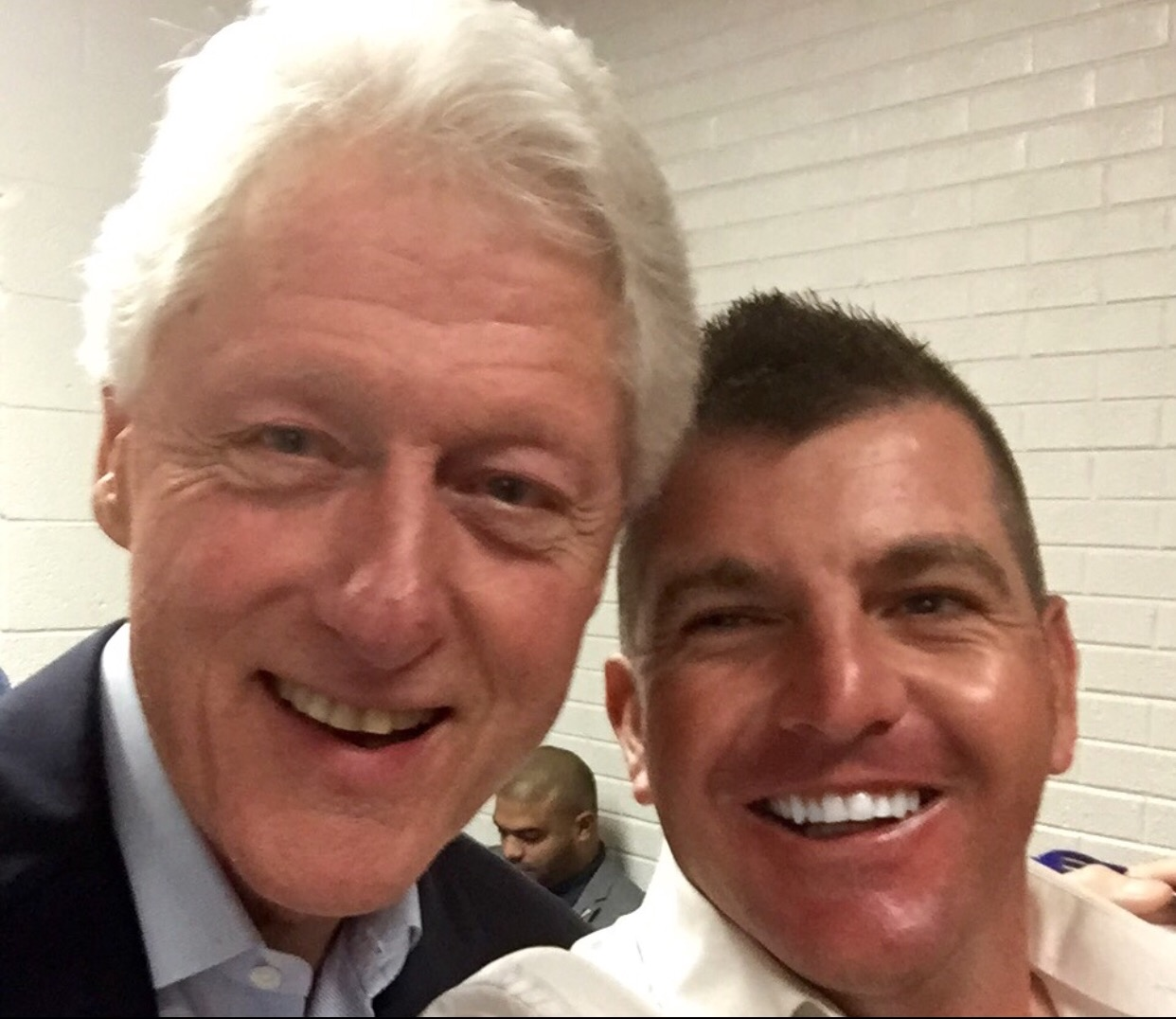
- Left to right: Bill Clinton and Morris; 20 March 2016, Phoenix, Arizona

Personal information
- Nationality: Ireland
- Born: December 4, 1981 (age 44) Swords, Republic of Ireland
- Height: 1.73 m (5 ft 8 in)
- Spouse: Kimberly
- Children: Trinity 2008; Fergus 2016

Career
- Sport: Golf
- College: Wingate University
- Turned professional: 2006
- Former tours: NGA Hooters Tour, E Golf Tour
- Professional wins: 11

Lorcan Morris (born 4 December 1981) is an Irish professional golf caddie on The PGA Tour Champions for Timothy O'Neal and the former caddie for Robert Garrigus on The PGA Tour. He is based in Boiling Springs, North Carolina.

== Early life ==
Morris was born in Dublin, Ireland and attended Rolestown NS and Malahide Community School. When he was a child his father built a flood lit driving net in their back garden for him to practice before and after school. He began his career of caddying at age 12 at the 1994 Ladies Irish Open where he caddied for Laura Davies. He credits his golf career to that chance meeting with Davies with whom he is still close friends to this day.

== Career ==
=== Amateur ===
Morris got a golf scholarship to Wingate University near Charlotte, North Carolina. He graduated in 2006 as the most successful Bulldog in program history. He won the 2005 UNCP Intercollegiate held at Carolina Sands golf club in a playoff with a birdie at the first playoff hole. Morris was a first team All American at Wingate in 2005 and 2006. While at Wingate, Morris won The Charlotte City Am in 2006. He also recorded a top 10 in The Florida Azalea Amateur in 2006 along with a top 20 at The Cardinal Amateur. Morris also won back-to-back to back Union County Amateur titles in 2004, 2005 and 2006 while at Wingate. He won the Amateur Golf Tour (now Golfweek Amateur Golf Tour) national championship in 2005 at the Wild Wing Resort in Myrtle Beach,SC, USA. Morris won his first of 2 Myrtle Beach Amateur championships in 2006.

=== Professional ===
Morris played professionally after college for 3 1/2 years on various mini tours winning 11 professional events He was the winner of the 2005 Golfweek Amateur Tour at the Wild Wing Resort in Myrtle Beach SC. This win was notable due to the fact he was 6 shots behind with 4 holes to go and finished birdie, eagle, birdie, birdie to clinch his first and only to date national championship. In October 2004 Morris was beaten in a play off at the same event by Tommy Miller of Boone, North Carolina on the first playoff hole with Morris failing to match Millers birdie. Morris has also won The Charlotte City Amateur (2006), Myrtle Beach Amateur (2006).

=== Caddying ===
After finishing playing professionally in 2009, Morris worked for several years as a caddie on The LPGA Tour for Laura Davies, Michelle Wie, Sophie Gustafson, and Sydnee Michaels with whom he won twice including the 2011 LPGA Futures Tour Championship. He was offered a full-time switch to the men’s game in 2011 with Robert Damron. Morris and Damron had limited success together prompting a split in August 2012. Morris then went to work for Mark Anderson on the PGA Tour who recorded his first and only career top 10 to date on the PGA Tour at The Walt Disney World Classic in Orlando. Morris retired from caddying in mid-2016 to spend more time with his family. He also returned to playing amateur golf.

=== Return to Amateur Golf ===
Morris won his 2nd Myrtle Beach Amateur Championship in November 2016 by 12 shots.

== Personal life ==
Morris lives in Boiling Springs, NC with his wife Kimberly, daughter and son.
