= Malahide Community School =

School in Malahide, Ireland

- Pobalscoil Íosa

Location
- Broomfield, Malahide, County Dublin; Ireland
- 53.4383°N 6.1526°W

Information
- Motto: Sapientia, Veritas, Ingenium (Latin for "Wisdom, Truth, Talent")
- Established: Catherine Dowling (1950s) and the Infant Jesus Sisters (1958)
- Principal: David Hayes
- Gender: Mixed
- Age: 12 to 19
- Enrollment: approx. 1200
- Website: http://www.malahidecs.ie

Malahide Community School (MCS; Irish: Pobalscoil Íosa), also known as Scoil Íosa by the students and staff, is a co-educational secondary school located in Malahide, County Dublin, Ireland. It accepts pupils of all religious denominations. The school grew from 512 students in 1976 to 1200 students by 2006, and remained at around 1200 as of 2018.

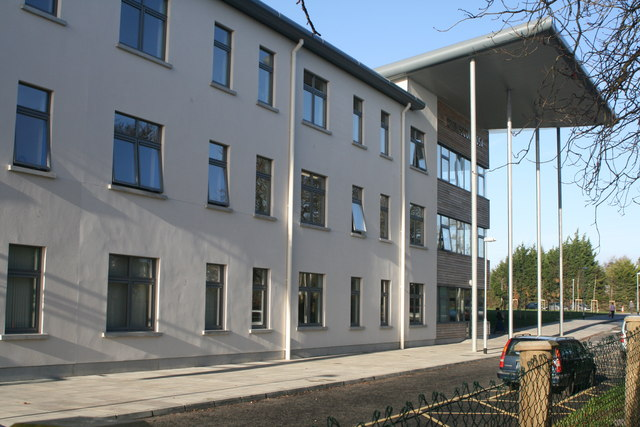
The School

== History ==
=== Foundation ===
In the early 1950s, Catherine Dowling set up the Stella Maris School in Malahide village. In 1958, the Infant Jesus Sisters founded Scoil Íosa, a junior and secondary school for girls, on what are now the grounds of Malahide Community School. The two schools were amalgamated.

In 1976, the school joined the community school system which meant that it was no longer private, and it was renamed Pobalscoil Íosa. The school population at that time was just over 500. A new building, now known as the Junior Block, was added, followed shortly afterward by a sports hall.

=== New building ===
A three-storey school building, planned in 2005 for a November 2006 opening, was affected by multiple delays, and finally opened in February 2007. The first part of the demolition was started in March 2006, and was completed before the Leaving Certificate that took place in early June. The grand opening of the new building took place on 5 October with the Minister for Education and Science, Mary Hanafin. Over the summer of 2008, the canteen facility was planned to be operational and in use for the new school year, and was actually working by the latter half of that year. The school had, by then, over 1100 pupils.

== Alumni ==
- Aodhán Ó Ríordáin, Labour Party TD
- Mark Little, RTÉ News correspondent and businessman
- Sharon Ní Bheoláin, RTÉ news presenter
- Eilish Cleary, physician and public health official in New Brunswick, Canada
- Domhnall Gleeson, actor
- Brian Gleeson, actor
- Niamh McEvoy, Dublin senior ladies' footballer and Australian Rules footballer
- Sinéad Aherne, Dublin senior ladies' footballer
- Gabrielle Reidy, actress
- Conor Sammon, footballer for the Republic of Ireland national football team
- Rene Gilmartin, Premier League footballer for Watford FC
- Dinny Corcoran, League of Ireland footballer
- Susan Loughnane, model and actress
- Lorcan Morris, Professional Golf Caddie
