= COVID-19 pandemic in Nova Scotia =

Ongoing COVID-19 viral pandemic in Nova Scotia, Canada

- Disease: COVID-19
- Pathogen: SARS-CoV-2
- Location: Nova Scotia, Canada
- First outbreak: Wuhan, Hubei, China
- Index case: Kings County
- Arrival date: March 15, 2020 (6 years, 6 months, 1 week and 4 days)
- Confirmed cases: 55,324
- Active cases: 10,698
- Hospitalized cases: 29
- Recovered: 44,381
- Deaths: 657
- Fatality rate: 0.44%

Government website
- Government of Nova Scotia

The COVID-19 pandemic in Nova Scotia is an ongoing viral pandemic of coronavirus disease 2019 (COVID-19), a novel infectious disease caused by severe acute respiratory syndrome coronavirus 2 (SARS-CoV-2). On March 15, 2020, three presumptive cases in Nova Scotia were announced. All three were travel-related.

The province is amongst four provinces in the Atlantic Bubble, along with New Brunswick, Prince Edward Island and Newfoundland and Labrador which have reported a significantly smaller portion of cases during the COVID-19 pandemic in Canada. However, the bubble was suspended in November 2020 due to rising case counts in all four provinces. It was reintroduced in the Spring 2021, but suspended again in the fall of 2021.

As of March 25, 2022, Nova Scotia has reported 55,324 cases and has the seventh-most cases of COVID-19 in Canada.

== Timeline ==
=== 2020 ===
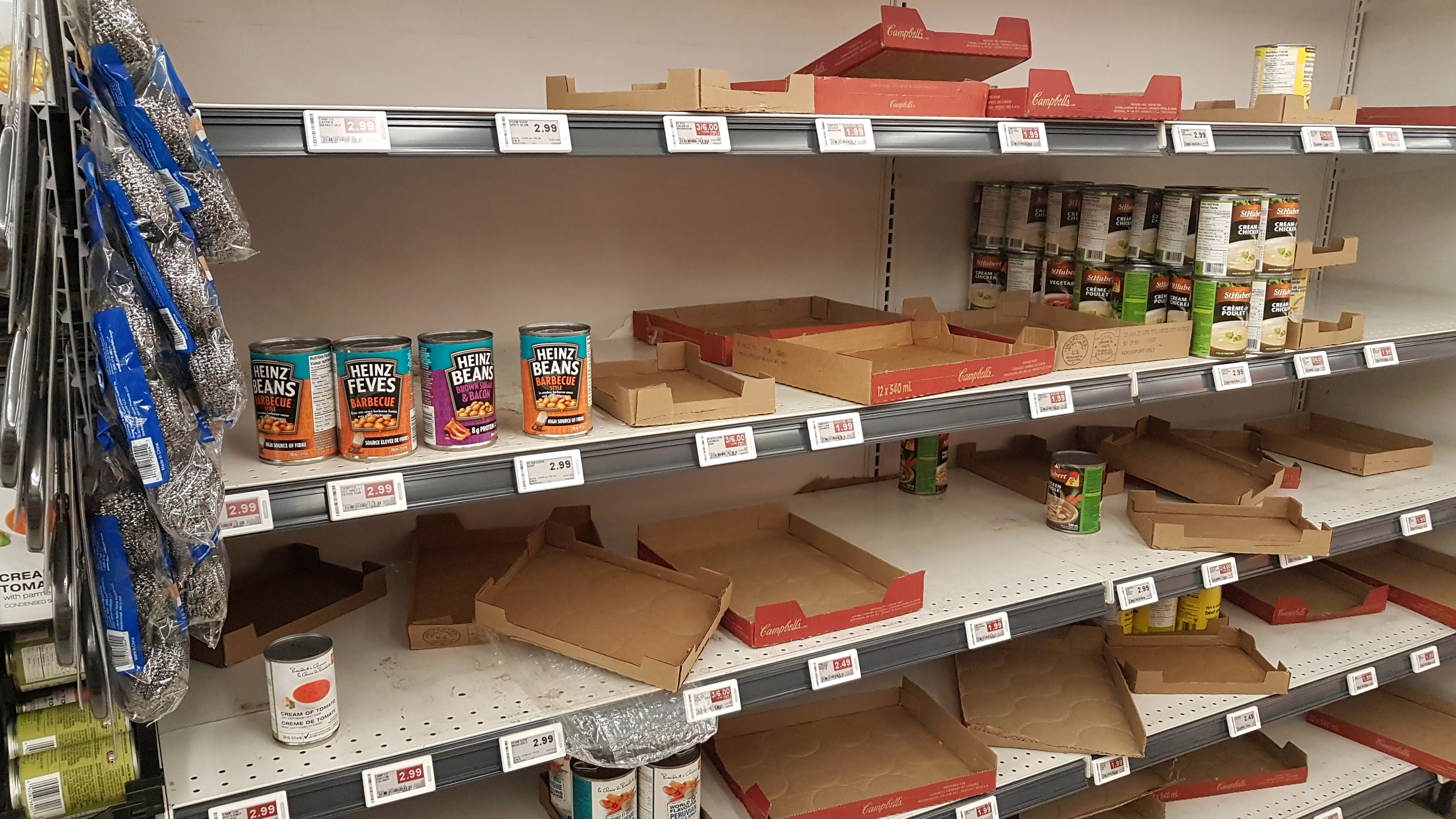
Canned food on short supply at a Halifax grocery store, 13 March 2020

On March 15, Nova Scotia's first three presumptive cases were detected, all travel-related. Respectively, these cases were a woman in her 60s from Kings County who visited Australia and returned March 8, a man in his late 50s from the Halifax area who attended a conference in California and returned March 13, and a man in his 30s from the Halifax area who travelled "throughout Europe" and returned March 10.

On March 16, two additional cases were reported. A man and a woman in their 50s from the Halifax area had not traveled, but had been in "close contact with individuals who had recently travelled outside the country."

On March 17, Chief Medical Officer of Health Robert Strang announced that the reporting of information about individual cases would cease in order to protect patient privacy, as well as to prevent a false sense of security in communities without detected cases.

On March 22, a provincial state of emergency was declared. It was also announced that the QEII Health Sciences Centre's Microbiology Lab in Halifax was certified to report positive and negative tests for COVID-19, thus cases could be confirmed within the province, without needing to send samples to the National Microbiology Lab for confirmation.

On March 23, it was reported that at least one of the new cases was a child under age 10.

On March 29, a Halifax woman was fined $697.50, and had her vehicle seized by police after she was found in a park despite Nova Scotia having closed parks and beaches to the public under its emergency measures act.

On March 30, Strang announced the first official case of community spread, per the government definition of a case that can not be connected to travel or a previously known case.

On March 31, it was reported that cases had been identified in four staff members and two residents of long-term care facilities for seniors.

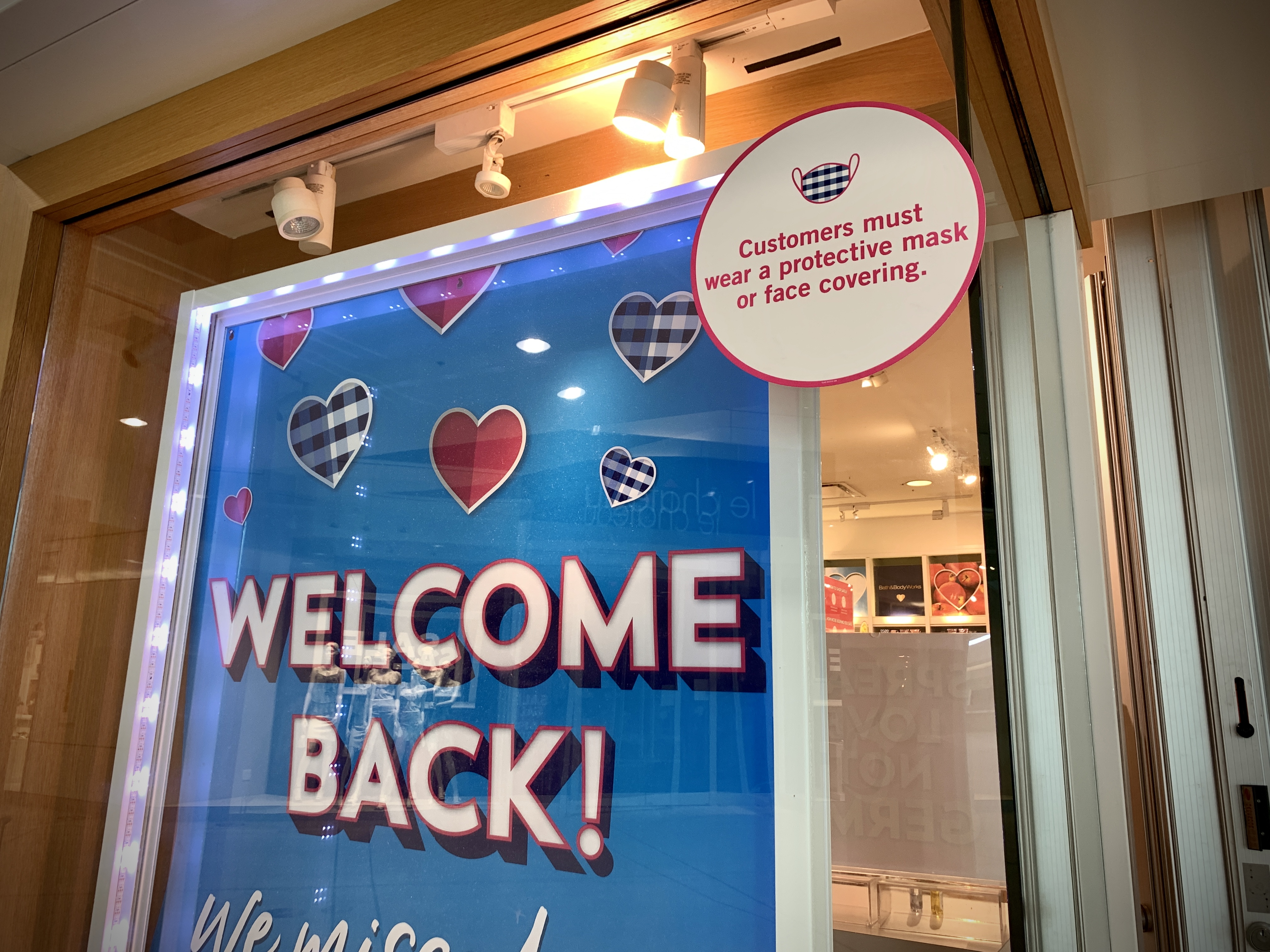
In July 2020, a poster welcoming customers back at Mic Mac Mall in Dartmouth.

On April 7, the province reported its first death, a Cape Breton woman in her 70s with underlying medical conditions.

On April 9, the province reported its second death, a Cape Breton woman in her 90s with underlying medical conditions.

On April 13, the province reported its third death, a male in his 80s in the Halifax area with underlying medical conditions.

On April 17, the province reported its fourth death, a Cape Breton woman in her 80s with underlying medical conditions.

On April 18, the province reported three more deaths, bringing the provincial total to seven. All three deaths occurred at long-term care facility, Northwood Halifax Campus in the Halifax Regional Municipality.

May 29 marked the first day since COVID-19 arrived in Nova Scotia that zero new cases were recorded.

=== 2021 ===
May 1, 2021, marked a record-breaking 148 new cases of COVID-19 in Nova Scotia, breaking the previous record of 96, with 30 people in hospital and 5 in the ICU.

May 4, 2021, marked another record-breaking 153 new cases with another two confirmed deaths related to COVID-19 in Nova Scotia.

On November 9, 2021, the province announced the temporary closure of Burton Ettinger Elementary School in Halifax until November 17 due to an outbreak of COVID-19.

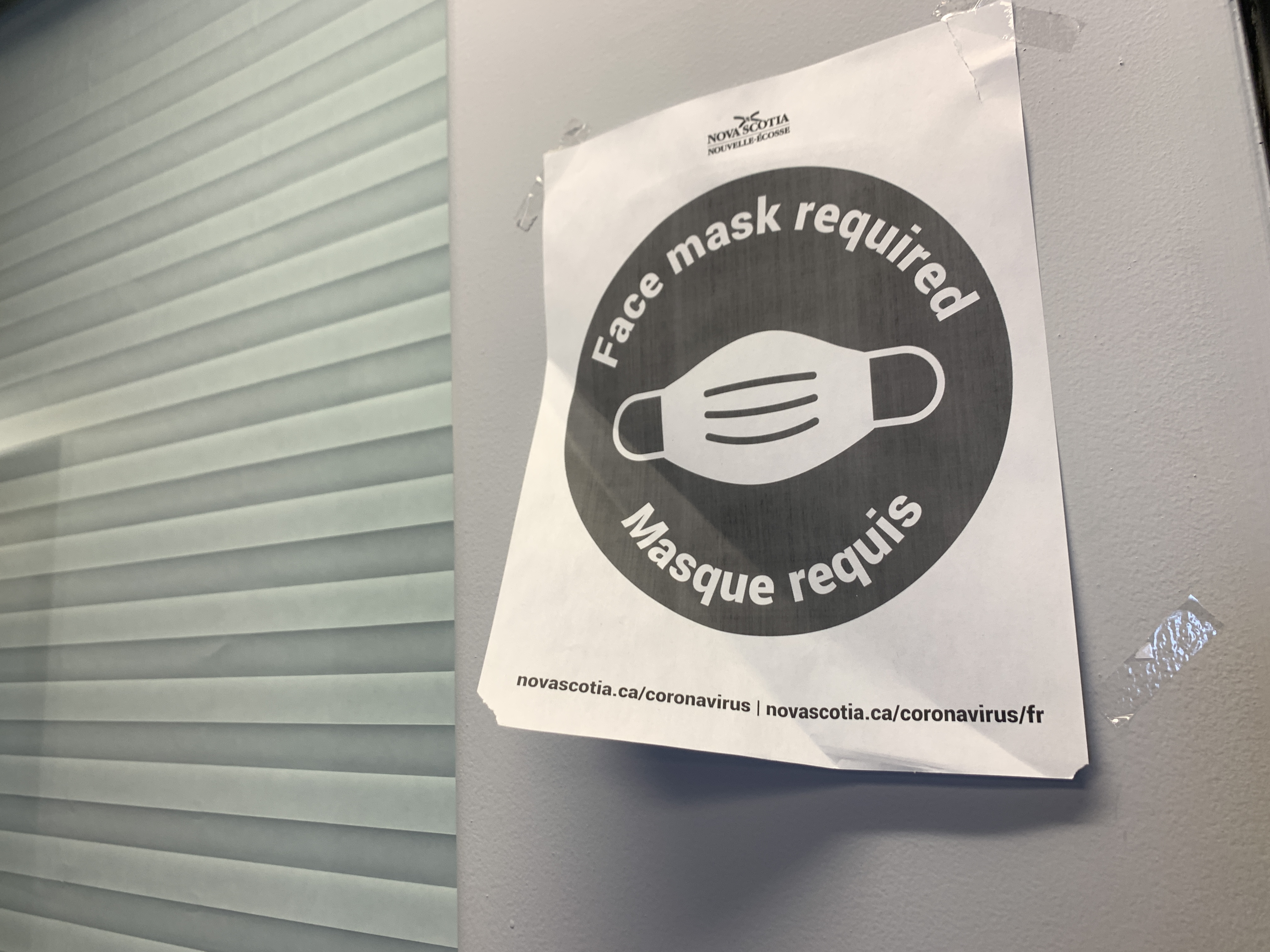
Face masks required at a workplace in Halifax, April 2021

November 17, 2021, pastor Robert Smith of the Gospel Light Baptist Church in Amherst was fined $2,422 for a religious gathering that happened between October 25 and 29 in violation of COVID-19 restrictions under the Health Protection Act. The gathering is believed to be responsible for an outbreak of COVID-19 in the Northern and Western health zones which lead to the transmission of the virus among residents of the East Cumberland Lodge, a long-term care home in Amherst. As a result, 31 residents and 10 staff tested positive for the virus and 2 died. A death in the Northern health zone is also linked to the religious gathering.

On December 3, 2021, St. Francis Xavier University held its annual X-Ring ceremony with thousands of people attending. This ceremony led to a COVID-19 outbreak within the school community, and elsewhere in Nova Scotia. Nova Scotia's premier Tim Houston announced on December 17, 2021, that the university and their Students' Union have both been issued summary offence tickets and fined $11,622.50 each; the maximum amount that can be handed out. Houston said the university failed to abide by the province's COVID-19 restrictions, specifically masking requirements. Since then, the province began experiencing a surge in COVID-19 cases, with their highest, single-day record on January 2, 2022, of 1,184 cases.

=== 2022 ===
On January 7, 2022, Dr. Nicole Boutilier, the vice-president of Medicine with Nova Scotia Health, shared in a zoom briefing with reporters that "We had anywhere between 14 and 39% vacancies in staffing, including nursing, before Omicron and that is causing significant pressure." and that most hospitals were operating at 97% percent capacity. Approximately 120 scheduled surgeries had been postponed due to this pressure on the healthcare system that prior week. That same week an outbreak at the provincial prison in Burnside resulted in 82 prisoners becoming infected with COVID-19.

== Government response ==
On February 28, the Nova Scotia Human Rights Commission issued a press release in which Nova Scotians were "asked to be vigilant against discrimination based on ethnic or national origin" and cautioned that the "Nova Scotia Human Rights Act protects against discrimination based on an irrational fear of contracting an illness or disease."

On March 4, Nova Scotia school trips to international destinations were cancelled.

On March 6, the provincial government announced that preparations for the virus were "well underway," including the implementation of a patient screening process for healthcare workers, monitoring and investigation of potential cases, application of public health and infection control measures, and work with the Nova Scotia's Emergency Management Office.

On March 9, new national screening protocols were implemented in which those who had travelled outside Canada were requested to monitor for symptoms for 14 days, and those who began to feel unwell were requested to stay home and self-isolate from the public. Those who developed a fever of 38 °C or higher and/or cough were requested to contact the health information line at 811 for assessment. Hygiene directives in regards to proper handwashing and cough etiquette were also issued.

On March 13, all Nova Scotia public sector employees who travelled outside Canada were required to self-isolate for 14 days upon return. Additionally, Nova Scotia museums and art galleries were closed.

On March 14, the Shubenacadie Wildlife Park was closed. Additionally, Nova Scotia prisons were closed to volunteer organizations, and inmates were limited to non-contact visitation by family and friends, meaning separation by a pane of glass and communication via a phone line. Inmates were also granted two free phone calls per week. There was no change in protocol for visitation by lawyers.

On March 15, provincial visitor information centres for tourists were closed, and the call centre responsible for fielding inquiries from tourists was also shuttered. Additionally, long-term care facilities were closed to visitors, public schools were shut for two weeks from March 23 following March Break (subject to reassessment and extension), day cares were closed, March Break camps were cancelled, casinos were closed, bar owners were no longer allowed to operate video lottery terminals (VLTs), everyone who travelled outside Canada was asked to self-isolate regardless of the development of symptoms, social distancing of two metres was recommended, and gatherings were restricted to 150 "or much smaller if possible." Further, all visitation to prisons was suspended and lawyers were asked to arrange alternative means of maintaining contact with clients. Inmates were granted extra phone calls. Correctional Services also closed its facilities to all visitors until further notice.

On March 16, Nova Scotians were directed to first complete an online screening questionnaire before calling the 811 hotline due to an overwhelming influx of calls. Additionally, the government of Nova Scotia issued a warning about ongoing investment scams, with individuals impersonating banks over the phone.

On March 17, Access Nova Scotia and offices of the Registry of Motor Vehicles were closed. Driver licences and vehicle registrations expiring in March, April and May were extended to August 31. Additionally, bars were ordered closed, restaurants were limited to take-out and delivery only, and public gatherings were limited to 50 or fewer.

On March 18, a number of new measures were announced to combat the spread of the virus. Doctors and pharmacists were granted expanded options for virtual care using telephone and video conference, pharmacists were allowed to renew prescriptions for most medications, employers were no longer allowed to require a doctor's note from employees seeking to take time off work, nurses were called from retirement to staff the 811 hotline, and service providers funded through the Department of Community Services' Disability Support Program were shuttered. A number of other services such as barber shops, tattoo shops, nail salons, and gyms were also ordered closed effective midnight March 19. Additionally, 41 inmates serving intermittent sentences in four adult prisons were released on temporary absence.

On March 19, Premier Stephen McNeil announced the allocation of $2.2 million for an increase of $50 to every individual and family member on income assistance, $1 million to the Feed Nova Scotia food bank, a three-month suspension of evictions, emergency funding of $230,000 for Senior Safety Programs and Community Links, as well as an order for university students still living in residence to go home, and for those university students unable to return home to practice social distancing.

On March 20, the provincial government announced an allocation of $161 million for cash flow and credit access for small and medium Nova Scotia businesses. Payments on many government loans to businesses were deferred until June 30, and payments on Nova Scotia student loans were suspended until September 30. The government also allocated $15 million as an incentive for internet service providers to expand internet infrastructure.

On March 21, a number of health measures were announced, including the restriction of visitors to hospitals and the opening of new assessment centres, of which there 14 at the time.

On March 22, the province of Nova Scotia declared a state of emergency. In accordance with the emergency declaration, land sea, and air points of entry were tightened, with anyone entering the province stopped, questioned, and told to self-isolate for 14 days, starting March 23. All provincial parks, beaches, and tourist attractions were closed, although provincial trails were left open for exercise. Police were authorized to enforce orders under the Health Protection Act, as well as the Emergency Management Act. Gatherings over 5 people were prohibited. Non-essential businesses were only allowed to remain open as long as a two-metre distance can be maintained. Dentists were no longer allowed to practice in their offices except in emergency circumstances.

On March 24, a series of new public health measures were announced, including the testing of all close contacts of positive cases, doubled lab capacity for viral testing, increased capacity for the 811 hotline, enhancement of infectious disease control measures in hospitals, restriction of regulated health professions to virtual care except for emergency or urgent cases, all non-regulated health professions closed, and the reopening of Access Nova Scotia Centres and Registry of Motor Vehicle Offices on a limited, reduced contact basis. Economic sectors deemed essential services and therefore exempt from gathering limitations were defined.

On March 26, qualifying criteria for viral testing was expanded beyond travel-related cases to include anyone referred to an assessment centre by the 811 system, all close contacts of confirmed cases, and people in hospital who meet testing criteria. An alternative hotline for sick medical staff was also established in response to an overburdened 811 system. Additionally, camping reservations were put on hold and open fires were banned within 305 metres of woods throughout the province.

On March 29, a Halifax woman was fined $697.50, and had her vehicle seized by police after she was found in a park despite Nova Scotia having closed parks and beaches to the public under its emergency measures act.

On March 30, the provincial government released a more comprehensive plan for how schools will proceed through the coronavirus pandemic, as well as an online tool for businesses.

On March 31, the provincial government announced that a map will be released in the near future online showing where cases are located across the province organized by the four health zones.

On April 1, the province of Nova Scotia renewed the declaration of a state of emergency extending the previous until April 19.

On April 3, premier McNeil concluded his briefing with the warning to "stay the blazes home". This phrase quickly went viral and became the subject of folk songs and merchandise.

On April 6, it was announced that travel was no longer a prerequisite for testing, as community spread had reached levels that anyone could potentially have the virus regardless of travel history.

On May 1, the province of Nova Scotia announced that a number of public health restrictions were eased, including the reopening of public parks and trails, opening the sportfishing season, and other measures. The mental health toll of lockdown was cited as a motive for this easing of restrictions.

On May 15, the province of Nova Scotia announced a further easing of restrictions, with "archery, equestrianism, golf, paddling, sailing/boating and tennis" allowed to resume, as well as the reopening of public beaches. The government also announced on this date the "immediate household bubble" policy, which allowed families to bubble with another household exclusively.

In June 2020, the Premier of Prince Edward Island Dennis King suggested that travel between provinces in the Atlantic region might be allowed, as early as the beginning of July. King claimed there was an agreement to this end, in a discussion held on June 10 between the Premiers. When asked by the CBC, the other Premiers expressed caution on an Atlantic bubble."

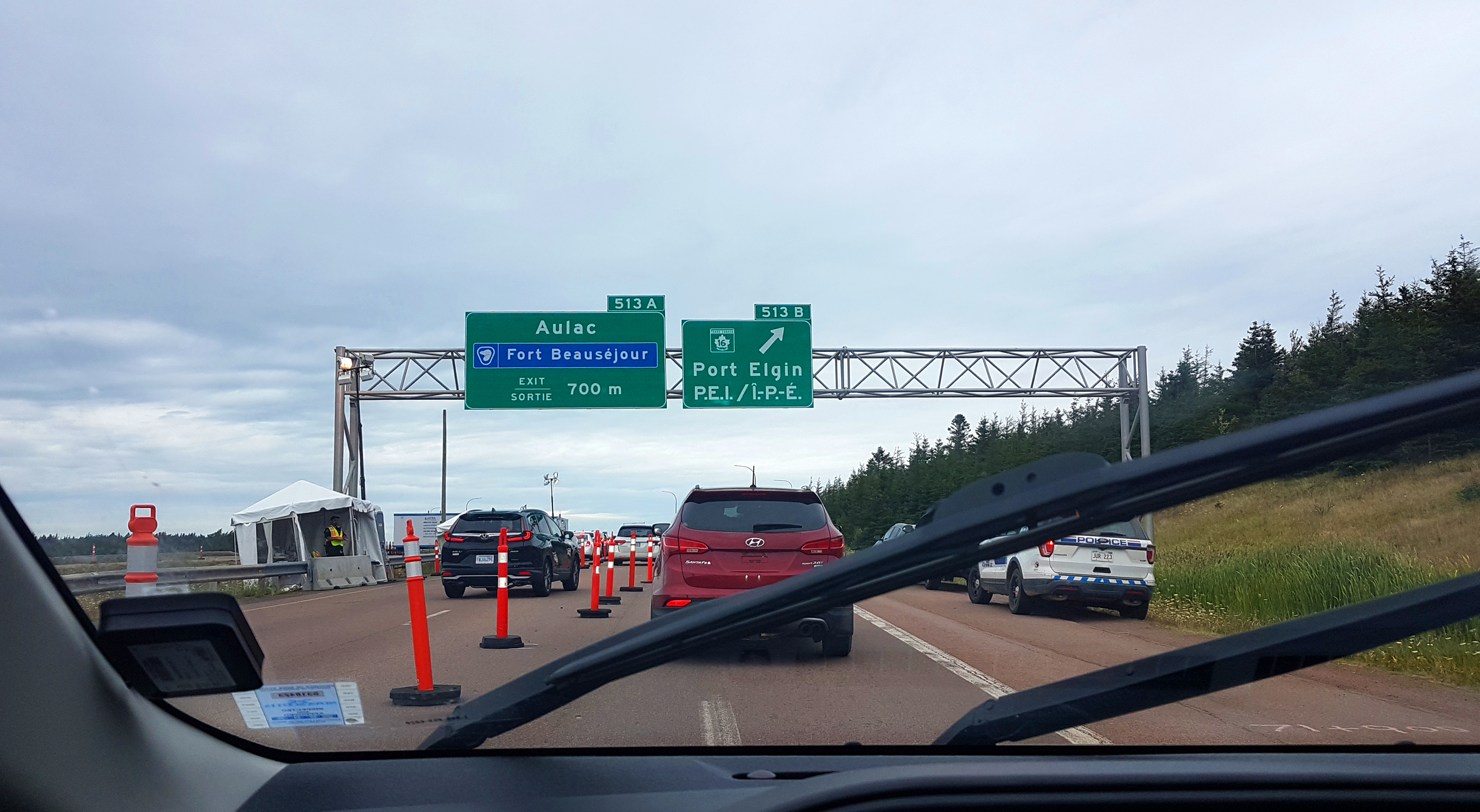
Traveling inside the Atlantic Bubble: a New Brunswick checkpoint on the Trans-Canada Highway, when entering from Nova Scotia in August 2020.

On July 3, the province along with the other three Atlantic provinces (Newfoundland and Labrador, Prince Edward Island and New Brunswick) lifted travel restrictions among themselves to form Atlantic bubble, allowing residents within the four provinces to travel without self-isolating for 14 days.

On October 28, CBC News reported that there were 1,046 provincial court cases that have surpassed the Jordan threshold, a law that was enacted in 2016 by the Supreme Court of Canada limiting the time between court cases to 18 months, or 30 months for superior courts.

On October 29, the provincial state of emergency was extended until November 14, 2021.

On November 2, 2021, the provincial government announced an extension to the deadline for mandatory vaccinations of public workers for those who receive at least one dose by November 15. All public workers in the province are required to be fully vaccinated by November 30 or they will be placed on unpaid leave. Those who are partially vaccinated by November 15 will get an addition 8 weeks to obtain their second dose, said provincial spokesperson Heather Fairbairn. Currently there are 80,000 employees in the province who fall under this mandate.

November 12, 2021 the provincial government announced an extension to the ongoing state of emergency. The state of emergency will continue from noon on November 14 to noon on November 28.

November 18, 2021 the Nova Scotia Department of Justice and the Premier's Office announced a new category of offences under the Health Protection Act for those who organize or attend illegal gatherings under current COVID-19 restrictions. For individuals, fines start at $2,422 for a first offence and increase to $11,622 for each subsequent offence. For organizations, fines will begin at $11,622 and increase to $57,622 for each subsequent offence. All fines will include victim surcharges and court fees. Individuals may also be required to serve jail time. These regulations are effective immediately. According to the news release, 1,375 summary offences and fines totaling $1.7 million have been issued since the provincial state of emergency was first declared.

November 19, 2021 Nova Scotia's Minister of Health and Wellness Michelle Thompson issued a statement announcing the approval of the Pfizer vaccine for children 5 to 11 by Health Canada, as well as the National Advisory Committee on Immunization's recommendations for pediatric use of the vaccine. The statement says the provincial government is working on finalizing their delivery plan of the vaccine.

On February 23, 2022, the government of Nova Scotia announced that all COVID-19 restrictions would end by March 21, 2022. This removed all previous gathering limits, social distancing and mask wearing requirements in public spaces and businesses. Requirements were also lifted in schools at the end of the following March break. Acute and long term care facilities would set restrictions on visitation at their own discretion going forward.

== Schools and universities ==
In March, all Nova Scotian universities suspended in-person classes and restricted access to their campuses. Many transitioned to a distance learning model for the remainder of the academic term.

The tentative plan for the 2020-2021 for the K-12 school year, as of August 14, includes the following plans:

- Students in grades P-12 will have in-class learning.
  - The use of cohorts or grouping will be used for those attending in person classes
- Students in grades 4-12 will be required to wear a mask in spaces where 2m/6 ft of distance cannot be maintained
- Kids who take the school bus will be required to wear a non-medical mask

== Economic impact ==
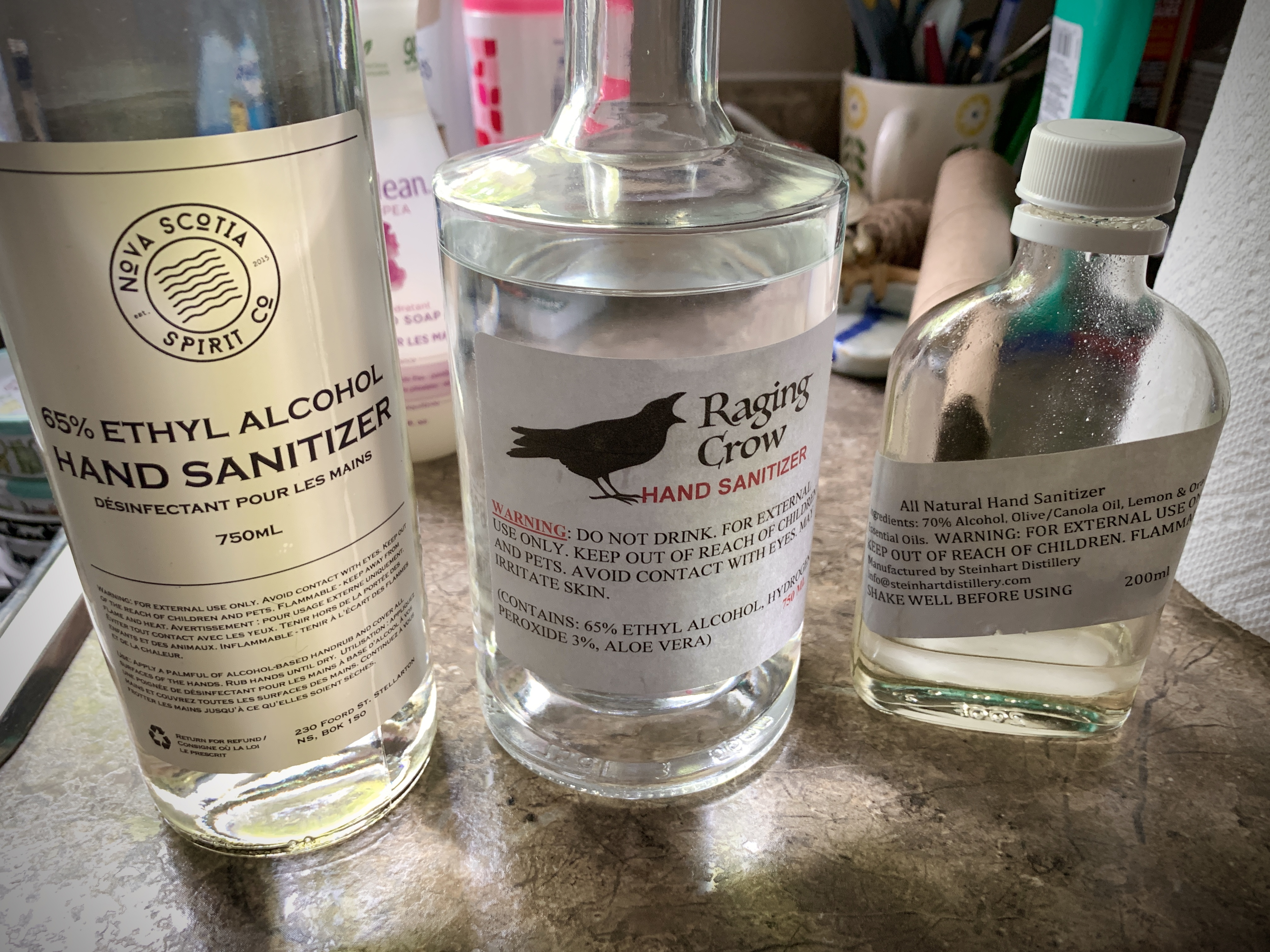
With hand sanitizers in high demand, local distillers have pivoted liquor production resources to ethyl alcohol hand sanitizer production.

In February, Nova Scotia's billion dollar lobster industry was negatively impacted by coronavirus, with a large portion of exports previously going to China. Lobster exports became difficult as air cargo carriers began to suspend service. Lobster prices dropped with a glut in the local market due to restricted exports.

In March, a number of Nova Scotia distilleries shifted production from alcoholic beverages to alcohol-based hand sanitizers.

According to a survey published by Restaurants Canada on April 2, 2020, approximately 24,500 Nova Scotian restaurant workers have lost their jobs. Staff have been laid off at about four out of five Nova Scotia restaurants since the beginning of March, around one tenth of restaurants have permanently closed, and a further 18% expect to close within a month if nothing changes. Some restaurants have been able to pivot to a take-out or delivery only business model in order to maintain cash flow amid mandatory closures of dining areas.

== Data ==
=== 2020 Case data ===
COVID-19 cases in Nova Scotia in 2020 (Note: Population data from the 2016 Canadian Census)
Date	Presumptive			Confirmed		Deaths		Recoveries		Cases by vaccination status (since March 15, 2021)			HC	NT	DT	TT	Tests per k	Cases per m	Sources																				
Date	New	PCC	Cml	New	Cml	New	Cml	New	Cml	Unvaccinated	Partially vaccinated	Fully vaccinated	HC	NT	DT	TT	Tests per k	Cases per m	Sources																				
Mar 15	3		3											415		418	0.4	3.1																					
Mar 16	2		5											671		676	0.7	5.1																					
Mar 17	2	1	7	1	1									934		942	1.0	7.2																					
Mar 18	5	2	9	2	3									1,141		1,153	1.2	12.3																					
Mar 19	2	2	9	2	5								1	1,373		1,387	1.4	14.3																					
Mar 20	1		10		5								1	1,546		1,561	1.6	15.3																					
Mar 21	6	4	12	4	9								1	1,826		1,847	1.9	21.5																					
Mar 22		12		21	28								2	2,088		2,116	2.2	28.6																					
Mar 23				13	41								1	2,308		2,349	2.4	41.9																					
Mar 24				10	51			1	1				1	2,474		2,525	2.6	52.2																					
Mar 25				17	68			1	2				1	2,772		2,840	2.9	69.6																					
Mar 26				5	73				2				2	3,201		3,274	3.3	74.7																					
Mar 27				17	90			1	3				2	3,649		3,739	3.8	92.1																					
Mar 28				20	110			1	4				3	4,031		4,141	4.2	112.5																					
Mar 29				12	122			3	7				3	4,731		4,853	5.0	124.8																					
Mar 30				5	127			3	10				4	5,054		5,181	5.3	129.9																					
Mar 31				20	147				10				4	5,763		5,910	6.0	150.4																					
Apr 1				26	173			1	11				5	6,764		6,937	7.1	177.0																					
Apr 2				20	193			5	16				5	7,446		7,639	7.8	197.0																					
Apr 3				14	207			5	21				5	8,234		8,441	8.6	211.7																					
Apr 4				29	236			29	50				4	8,964		9,200	9.4	241.4																					
Apr 5				26	262			3	53				6	9,510		9,772	10.0	268.0																					
Apr 6				31	293			11	64				9	10,218		10,511	10.8	299.8																					
Apr 7				17	310	1	1	2	66				11	10,621		10,931	11.2	317.1																					
Apr 8				32	342		1	11	77				11	11,346		11,688	12.0	349.9																					
Apr 9				31	373	1	2	5	82				10	12,177		12,550	12.8	381.6																					
Apr 10				34	407		2	11	93				8	13,014		13,421	13.7	416.4																					
Apr 11				21	428		2	2	95				8	13,632		14,060	14.4	437.9																					
Apr 12				17	445		2	2	97				9	14,295		14,740	15.1	455.3																					
Apr 13				29	473	1	3	4	101				9	15,580		16,053	16.4	483.9																					
Apr 14				43	517		3	23	124				10	16,755		17,272	17.7	528.9																					
Apr 15				32	549		3	13	137				9	17,419		17,968	18.4	561.2																					
Apr 16				30	579		3	39	176				11	18,453		19,059	19.5	592.3																					
Apr 17				27	606	1	4	1	177				11	19,506		20,112	20.6	620.0																					
Apr 18				43	649	3	7	7	184				11	20,312		20,961	21.4	664.0																					
Apr 19				26	675	2	9	16	200				11	21,120		21,795	22.3	690.6																					
Apr 20				46	721		9	48	248				12	21,769		22,490	23.0	737.6																					
Apr 21				16	737	1	10	38	286				11	22,190		22,927	23.5	754.0																					
Apr 22				35	772	2	12	44	330				10	22,993		23,765	24.3	789.8																					
Apr 23				55	827	4	16	28	358				10	23,731		24,558	25.1	846.1																					
Apr 24				23	850		16	34	392				11	24,521		25,371	26.0	869.6																					
Apr 25				15	865	6	22	20	412				11	25,119		25,984	26.6	884.9																					
Apr 26				8	873	2	24	27	439				13	25,615		26,488	27.1	893.1																					
Apr 27				27	900		24	70	509				12	26,231		27,131	27.8	920.8																					
Apr 28				15	915	3	27	13	522				12	26,902		27,817	28.5	936.1																					
Apr 29				20	935	1	28	7	529				11	27,486		28,421	29.1	956.6																					
Apr 30				12	947		28	16	545				10	28,209		29,156	29.8	968.8																					
May 1				12	959	1	29	47	592				10	28,883		29,842	30.5	981.1																					
May 2				4	963	2	31	17	609				9	29,406		30,369	31.1	985.2																					
May 3				8	971	6	37	15	624				6	29,945		30,916	31.6	993.4																					
May 4				14	985	1	38	14	638				6	30,441		31,426	32.2	1,007.7																					
May 5				6	991	3	41	14	652				6	30,984		31,975	32.7	1,013.9																					
May 6				7	998		41	9	661				5	31,541		32,539	33.3	1,021.0																					
May 7				9	1,007	3	44	47	708				5	32,289		33,269	34.1	1,030.2																					
May 8				1	1,008	2	46	14	722				5	32,835		33,843	34.6	1,031.2																					
May 9				3	1,011	1	47	21	743				7	33,190		34,201	35.0	1,034.3																					
May 10				7	1,018		47	6	749				9	33,579		34,597	35.4	1,041.5																					
May 11				1	1,019	1	48	18	767				9	33,869		34,888	35.7	1,042.5																					
May 12				1	1,020		48	97	864				9	34,204		35,224	36.0	1,043.5																					
May 13				4	1,024	3	51	6	870				9	34,604		35,628	36.4	1,047.6																					
May 14				2	1,026		51	39	909				9	35,004		36,030	36.9	1,049.7																					
May 15				8	1,034	4	55	9	918				9	35,375		36,409	37.2	1,057.8																					
May 16				3	1,037		55	12	930				8	35,703		36,740	37.6	1,060.9																					
May 17				3	1,040		55	8	938				8	35,970		37,010	37.9	1,064.0																					
May 18				3	1,043		55	8	946				8	36,263		37,306	38.2	1,067.1																					
May 19				1	1,044	1	56	10	956				9	36,438		37,482	38.3	1,068.1																					
May 20				1	1,045	1	57		956				8	36,656		37,701	38.6	1,069.1																					
May 21				1	1,046	1	58	3	959				9	37,078		38,124	39.0	1,070.1																					
May 22				2	1,048		58	2	961				8	37,405		38,453	39.3	1,072.2																					
May 23				1	1,049		58	8	969				6	37,671		38,720	39.6	1,073.2																					
May 24				1	1,050		58	4	973				6	38,055		39,105	40.0	1,074.2																					
May 25				1	1,051		58	1	974				6	38,458		39,509	40.4	1,075.2																					
May 26				1	1,052	1	59	2	976				7	38,999		40,051	41.0	1,076.3																					
May 27				1	1,053		59	-1	975				7	39,441		40,494	41.4	1,077.3																					
May 28				2	1,055		59	2	977				8	40,240		41,295	42.2	1,079.3																					
May 29					1,055		59	1	978				8	40,914		41,969	42.9	1,079.3																					
May 30				1	1,056	1	60		978				7	41,391		42,447	43.4	1,080.4																					
May 31					1,056		60	3	981				7	41,944		43,000	44.0	1,080.4																					
Jun 1				1	1,057		60	3	984				6	42,426		43,483	44.5	1,081.4																					
Jun 2					1,057		60	8	992				5	42,861		43,918	44.9	1,081.4																					
Jun 3				1	1,058		60	1	993				3	43,340		44,398	45.4	1,082.4																					
Jun 4					1,058	1	61	2	995				3	43,911		44,969	46.0	1,082.4																					
Jun 5					1,058		61	2	997				3	44,477		45,535	46.6	1,082.4																					
Jun 6					1,058		61	2	999				3	45,094		46,152	47.2	1,082.4																					
Jun 7				1	1,059		61		999				3	45,466		46,525	47.6	1,083.4																					
Jun 8					1,059		61																																
Jun 9				1	1,060	1	62																																
Jun 10				1	1,061		62	-5	994				2	46,668		47,729	48.8	1,085.5																					
Jun 11					1,061		62	1	995				2	47,145		48,206	49.3	1,085.5																					
Jun 12					1,061		62		995				2	47,726		48,787	49.9	1,085.5																					
Jun 13				1	1,062		62	1	996				2	48,384		49,446	50.6	1,086.5																					
Jun 14				-1	1,061		62		996				2	48,786		49,847	51.0	1,086.5																					
Jun 15					1,061		62		996				2	49,100				1,086.5																					
Jun 16					1,061		62	1	997				2	49,398				1,086.5																					
Jun 17					1,061		62		997				2	49,775				1,086.5																					
Jun 18					1,061		62		997				2	50,240				1,086.5																					
Jun 19					1,061		62	1	998				2	50,540			51.0	1,086.5																					
Jun 20					1,061		62		998				2	50,825				1,086.5																					
Jun 21					1,061		62		998				2	51,111				1,086.5																					
Jun 22					1,061		62		998				2	51,242				1,086.5																					
Jun 23					1,061		62		998				2	51,530				1,086.5																					
Jun 24					1,061		62		998				2	51,817				1,086.5																					
Jun 25					1,061		62		998				2	52,266				1,086.5																					
Jun 26					1,061		62		998				2	52,553				1,086.5																					
Jun 27					1,061		62		998				2	52,811				1,086.5																					
Jun 28					1,061		62		998				2	53,056				1,086.5																					
Jun 29					1,061		62		998				2	53,263				1,086.5																					
Jun 30				1	1,062		62		998				2	53,544				1,086.5																					
Jul 1				1	1,063		62		998				2	53,947				1,086.5		Date	New	PCC	Cml	New	Cml	New	Cml	New	Cml	Unvaccinated	Partially vaccinated	Fully vaccinated	HC	NT	DT	TT	Tests per k	Cases per m	Sources
Presumptive			Confirmed		Deaths		Recoveries		Cases by vaccination status (since March 15, 2021)											Date													HC	NT	DT	TT	Tests per k	Cases per m	Sources

=== 2021 Case data ===
COVID-19 cases in Nova Scotia in 2021
Date	Presumptive			Confirmed		Deaths		Recoveries		Cases by vaccination status (since March 15, 2021)			HC	NT	DT	TT	Tests per k	Cases per m	Sources
Date	New	PCC	Cml	New	Cml	New	Cml	New	Cml	Unvaccinated	Partially vaccinated	Fully vaccinated	HC	NT	DT	TT	Tests per k	Cases per m	Sources
Nov 1				59	7,413	1	101	61	7,146	4,931 (87.3%)	359 (6.4%)	359 (6.4%)	10			1,315,886		7,631.2	
Nov 2				11	7,424	0	101	16	7,162	4,931 (87.3%)	359 (6.4%)	359 (6.4%)	8			1,317,616		7,642.6	
Nov 3				38	7,462	0	101	19	7,181	No update	No update	No update	8			1,321,013		7,681.7	
Nov 4				50	7,512	0	101	17	7,198	No update	No update	No update	9 (1 ICU)	3,962	4,012	1,325,072	1,364	7,733.2	
Nov 5				40	7,550	0	101	31	7,229	5,056 (86.7%)	371 (6.3%)	406 (7.0%)	9 (1 ICU)	3,164	3,204	1,328,408	1,367.5	7,772.3	
Nov 8				111	7,661	0	101	76	7,305	No update	No update	No update	9 (1 ICU)		2,068	1,336,176	1,375.5	7,886.5	
Nov 9				56	7,717	1	102	29	7,334	No update	No update	No update	10 (2 ICU)	2,610	2,666	1,338,876	1,378.3	7,944.2	
Nov 10				30	7,746	0	102	33	7,367	No update	No update	No update	10 (1 ICU)	2,999	3,029	1,341,971	1,381.4	7,974.0	
Nov 12				70	7,815	0	102	69	7,436	5,187 (85.5%)	391 (6.4%)	489 (8.1%)	10 (1 ICU)	5,933	6,003	1,347,985	1,387.6	8,045.1	
Nov 15				99	7,913	3 (Note: No explanation for discrepancy between new and cumulative deaths. It is possible that previously reported deaths were unconfirmed.)	103	109	7,545	No update	No update	No update	16 (7 ICU)	8,596	8,695	1,356,681	1,396.6	8,146.0	
Nov 16				31	7,944	0	105	41	7,586	No update	No update	No update	16 (7 ICU)	2,862	2,893	1,359,574	1,399.6	8,177.9	
Nov 17				20	7,963	0	105	36	7,622	No update	No update	No update	17 (7 ICU)	3,402	3,422	1,362,997	1,403.1	8,197.4	
Nov 18				22	7,985	0	105	22	7,644	No update	No update	No update	17 (7 ICU)	3,698	3,720	1,366,714	1,406.9	8,220.1	
Nov 19				27	8,012	1	106	40	7,684	5,325 (84.4%)	391 (6.2%)	590 (9.4%)	15 (7 ICU)	3,915	3,942	1,370,662	1,411.0	8,247.9	
Nov 22				60	8,072	1	107	88	7,772	No update	No update	No update	16 (7 ICU)	7,489	7,549	1,378,316	1,418.9	8,309.6	
Nov 23				29	8,100	0	107	37	7,809	No update	No update	No update	18 (6 ICU)	2,895	2,924	1,381,247	1,421.9	8,338.5	
Nov 24				20	8,119	0	107	31	7,840	No update	No update	No update	18 (6 ICU)	3,303	3,323	1,384,570	1,425.3	8,358.0	
Nov 25				22	8,141	1	108	24	7,864	No update	No update	No update	17 (5 ICU)	3,756	3,778	1,388,359	1,429.2	8,380.7	
Nov 26				28	8,169	0	108	25	7,889	5,412 (83.8%)	395 (6.1%)	655 (10.1%)	14 (5 ICU)	3,287	3,315	1,391,704	1,432.6	8,409.5	
Nov 29				59	8,228	2	110	58	7,947	No update	No update	No update	13 (4 ICU)	8,692	8,751	1,400,455	1,441.6	8,470.2	
Nov 30				61	8,288	0	110	31	7,978	No update	No update	No update	13 (4 ICU)	2,938	2,999	1,403,461	1,444.7	8,532.0	
Dec 1				35	8,322	0	110	31	8,009	No update	No update	No update	15 (8 ICU)	2,978	3,013	1,406,481	1,447.8	8,567.0	
Date	New	PCC	Cml	New	Cml	New	Cml	New	Cml	Unvaccinated	Partially vaccinated	Fully vaccinated	HC	NT	DT	TT	Tests per k	Cases per m	Sources
Date	Presumptive			Confirmed		Deaths		Recoveries		Cases by vaccination status (since March 15, 2021)			HC	NT	DT	TT	Tests per k	Cases per m	Sources

=== Data by health zone ===
COVID-19 cases in Nova Scotia by health zone, as of Dec 1, 2021
Health zone	Conf.	New	Active	Recovered	Population (2016)	Per 100k	Deaths	Death Sources
Central - Zone 4	6,087	16	95	5,905	461,674	20.58	87	
Eastern - Zone 3	724	0	3	713	162,088	1.85	8	
Northern - Zone 2	876	16	95	774	148,470	63.99	7	
Western - Zone 1	635	3	10	617	199,165	5.02	8	
Data obtained from Nova Scotia COVID-19 Dashboard. Population data from the 2016 Canadian census by Statistics Canada.

=== Data by community health network ===
COVID-19 cases in Nova Scotia by health zone, as of Feb 5, 2021
Community health network	Conf.	Population (2016)	Per m	Deaths	Death Sources
Annapolis County, Kings County	64	81,191	788.26		
Antigonish County, Guysborough County	17	28,265	601.45		
Bedford, Sackville	134				
Cape Breton County	51	98,722	516.60		
Colchester County, East Hants	77	73,038	1,054.24		
Cumberland County	5	30,005	166.64		
Chebucto, Halifax Peninsula	707				
Dartmouth, Southeastern	404				
Eastern Shore, Musquodoboit	11				
Inverness County, Nova Scotia, Richmond County, Victoria County	10	33,288	300.41		
Lunenburg County, Nova Scotia, Queens County	29	57,477	504.55		
Pictou County	45	43,748	1,028.62		
West Hants	11	15,368	715.77		
Yarmouth County, Shelburne County, Digby County	1	55,708	17.95		

=== Vaccinations ===
COVID-19 vaccinations in Nova Scotia, as of Dec 1, 2021
Date	By total number of doses				Total doses			By vaccine product			
Date	1st dose	2nd dose	3+ doses	All	Administered	Received	% Administered	Pfizer	Moderna	AstraZeneca	Johnson & Johnson
Nov 1	4.7%	78.5%		83.2%	1,576,169	1,661,340					
Nov 2	4.7%	763,954	3,238	809,879	1,577,463	1,661,340	94.95%	1,099,080	502,200	60,160	N/A
Nov 3	4.6%	764,967	3,634	810,732	1,579,333	1,661,340	95%	No update	No update	No update	N/A
Nov 4	4.5%	766,001	4,135	810,732	1,581,328	1,661,340	95%	No update	No update	No update	N/A
Nov 5	4.5%	767,200	4,586	811,192	1,583,479	1,661,340	95%	No update	No update	No update	N/A
Nov 8	4.5%	768,658	5,182	811,693	1,586,285	1,661,340	95%	No update	No update	No update	N/A
Nov 9	4.5%	769,498	5,848	812,812	1,588,158	1,661,340	96%	No update	No update	No update	N/A
Nov 10	4.5%	770,891	6,642	812,812	1,590,862	1,661,340	96%	No update	No update	No update	N/A
Nov 12	4.5%	772,138	7,306	813,329	1,593,242	1,661,340	96%	1,176,300	522,500	60,160	N/A
Nov 15	4.1%	773,294	7,713	813,798	1,595,200	1,661,340	96%	No update	No update	No update	N/A
Nov 16	4.1%	774,025	8,223	814,193	1,596,720	1,661,340	96%	No update	No update	No update	N/A
Nov 17	3.7%	783,666	8,866	814,472	1,613,097	1,661,340	97%	No update	No update	No update	N/A
Nov 18	3.7%	784,644	9,327	820,565	1,614,902	1,661,340	97%	No update	No update	No update	N/A
Nov 19	3.6%	785,380	9,729	821,241	1,616,350	1,661,340	97%	No update	No update	No update	N/A
Nov 22 (Note: Due to technical issues, the provincial government was unable to provide an update on immunizations. The data from the 22nd will be included with the data on the 23rd.)	N/A	N/A	N/A	N/A	N/A	N/A	N/A	N/A	N/A	N/A	N/A
Nov 23 (Note: Due to ongoing technical issues, immunization data is unavailable until the issues are resolved.)	N/A	N/A	N/A	N/A	N/A	N/A	N/A	N/A	N/A	N/A	N/A
Nov 24	3.6%	787,353	13,160	Unknown	1,622,765	1,661,340	98%	No update	No update	No update	N/A
Nov 25	3.5%	788,242	15,021	822,252	1,625,969	1,661,340	98%	No update	No update	No update	N/A
Nov 26	3.4%	788,942	16,690	823,105	1,628,737	1,661,340	98%	No update	No update	No update	N/A
Nov 29	Unknown	789,898	18,800	Unknown	1,632,289	1,661,340	98%	No update	No update	No update	N/A
Nov 30	3.3%	790,742	20,858	823,591	1,635,675	1,661,340	98%	No update	No update	No update	N/A
Dec 1	3.2%	791,542	22,548	824,075	1,638,694	1,661,340	99%	No update	No update	No update	N/A
All information provided by the Government of Nova Scotia's COVID-19 data dashboard, (Note: Nova Scotia's COVID-19 case data is not updated on weekends. All weekend data is published on Monday the following week.) and the COVID-19 Tracker Canada, an independent data collection project. Some data may not add up due to time discrepancies between sources.

On September 29, 2021, the provincial government announced a vaccine mandate for more than 80,000 employees working in a number of public sectors. On November 5, 2021, the Department of Health and Wellness issued a news release with data regarding the rates of vaccination amongst these groups. On November 17, 2021, another update on vaccination rates was announced. On November 24, 2021, the provincial government again released data, with breakdown by sector as follows:

- Nova Scotia Health Authority: 95% fully vaccinated, 4% partial (90% reporting)
- IWK Health Centre: 99% fully vaccinated, 1% partial, (99% reporting)
- Long-term care: 95% fully vaccinated, 3% partial (95% reporting)
- Home care: 95% fully vaccinated, 4% partial (97% reporting)
- Education: 97% fully vaccinated, 2% partial (90% reporting)
- Emergency Health Services: 99% fully vaccinated, 1% partial (92% reporting)

The province says those who do not intend to get vaccinated, or who have not yet reported their vaccination status, will be subjected to a mandatory vaccine education program.

On November 17, 2021, the province announced that eligible individuals could begin booking booster shots starting November 23. Those eligible are: anyone older than 70, anyone who received 2 doses of the AstraZeneca vaccine, and frontline healthcare workers whose first and second doses were given less than 28 days apart.

The Nova Scotia Department of Health and Wellness received a $430,000 grant from the Public Health Agency of Canada's Immunization Partnership Fund to promote COVID-19 vaccines to people of African descent in the province.
