= Heather Morrison =

Canadian emergency room physician

Heather Morrison OPEI is a Canadian emergency room physician who serves as the Chief Public Health Officer (also referred to as the Medical Officer Of Health) for Prince Edward Island. She was the first woman to receive the Rhodes Scholarship in the Prince Edward Island region, and was named The Guardian’s Newsmaker of the Year in 2020.

== Early life and education ==
Morrison grew up outside of Charlottetown in rural Prince Edward Island. She cites that a high school chemistry teacher, named Mr. Spenceley, convinced her to stay in a science class when she didn't want to. Morrison completed a Bachelor Of Science degree at the University of Prince Edward Island in 1991. She completed a Master’s degree, and a Doctor Of Philosophy degree at Oxford University, in the United Kingdom. Next, Morrison completed medical school training at the Dalhousie University, with residency training in community medicine at the University of Toronto.

== Career ==
In July 2007, Morrison was appointed as the Chief Public Health Officer for Prince Edward Island (PEI).

Previously, Morrison has served as the Chair of the Canadian Council of Chief Medical Officers of Health, the Co-Chair of the Opioid Action Plan for PEI, Co-Chair of the Ebola response for PEI, and Chair of the Provincial infection and prevention control Committee. She has also served as a representative on behalf of the PEI on the Public Health Network Council of Canada, the national Special Advisory Committee in H1N1, and on the Epidemic of opioid overdoses committee.

Morrison has spoken about different aspects of the COVID-19 pandemic in Prince Edward Island, including the COVID-19 vaccines, preparations for vaccine delivery and roll-out in Prince Edward Island, and public health practices, for multiple media outlets. Morrison's leadership during the COVID-19 pandemic in Prince Edward Island has been recognized in various media outlets, and earned different forms of recognition, including being named The Guardian’s Newsmaker of the Year (2020) and having a calf named after her.

== Personal life ==
Morrison has a husband and four children.

== Honours and awards ==
- The Guardian’s Newsmaker of the Year (2020)
- University of Prince Edward Island's Distinguished Alumni Awards (2016)
- City of Summerside's Frances O. Perry Good Neighbour of the Year (2021)
- Order of Prince Edward Island (2021)
