= COVID-19 pandemic in New Brunswick =

Ongoing COVID-19 viral pandemic in New Brunswick, Canada

- Disease: COVID-19
- Pathogen: SARS-CoV-2
- Location: New Brunswick, Canada
- First outbreak: Wuhan, Hubei, China
- Index case: Southeastern New Brunswick
- Arrival date: March 11, 2020 (6 years, 2 months and 1 week)
- Confirmed cases: 45,101 (2022)
- Active cases: 4,443 (2022)
- Recovered: 40,322 (2022)
- Deaths: 1,017 (2024)
- Fatality rate: 0.74% (2022)

Government website
- New Brunswick COVID-19 Dashboard

The COVID-19 pandemic in New Brunswick is an ongoing viral pandemic of coronavirus disease 2019 (COVID-19), a novel infectious disease caused by severe acute respiratory syndrome coronavirus 2 (SARS-CoV-2). The province of New Brunswick has the eight-most cases (out of ten provinces and three territories) of COVID-19 in Canada, having confirmed their first case on March 11, 2020.

In New Brunswick's first case, the person had returned to southeastern New Brunswick from France, and self-isolated at home. The second case was a close contact.

On July 3, New Brunswick joined three other provinces to form the Atlantic Bubble, which allowed free travel amongst the member provinces but restricted access to travellers from outside provinces. However, this was suspended in November 2020, reopened in Spring 2021, then again suspended in Fall 2021, due to rising case counts.

As of May 21, 2022, New Brunswick has reported 64,490 cases, with 40,322 recoveries and 411 deaths. As of March 2024, the death toll was 1,017.

== Timeline ==
As of November 20, New Brunswick has reported 401 cases, with the first one reported on March 11.

In New Brunswick's first case, the person had returned to southeastern New Brunswick from France, and self-isolated at home. The second case was a close contact.

On March 15, the province reported four more presumptive cases in the central part of the province.

On March 16, New Brunswick confirmed one more case, and announced one more presumptive case, making 2 confirmed cases and 5 presumptive in total.

On March 17, an eighth case was announced. This is the first child in the province to become infected.

On March 18, three new cases were reported, two in the central part of the province and one more in the southeastern part of the province, bringing the total of confirmed and presumptive cases in the province to 11.

On March 21, six new cases were announced, five in the southern part of the province and one more in the central part of the provinces, bringing the total of confirmed and presumptive cases in the province to 17.

However, on March 23, it was announced that presumptive positives no longer had to be sent to the National Microbiology Lab (NML) in Winnipeg for confirmatory testing, thus confirming all presumptive cases in the province at the time.

On March 24, the 18th case of COVID-19 in New Brunswick was confirmed in the southeastern part of the province. These include: eight cases of COVID-19 in health zone #3 (Fredericton, surrounding areas and Central New Brunswick), six more cases in health zone #2 (Saint John and most of the Fundy coast) and four cases in health zone #1 (Moncton and Southeastern New Brunswick).

On March 25, eight new cases were announced in New Brunswick, bringing total to 26. One case is in hospital, but not ICU. All new cases are among travelers from outside the province or close contacts of travelers. Cases increased to 33 on March 26 and 45 on March 27.

During the March 27 regular afternoon provincial press conference, it was announced that of the 12 new cases announced, 11 were travel-related. The remaining case could not be determined to be a recent out-of-province traveller or close contact of one, thus it may represent the first case of community transmission in the province.

An outbreak occurred in the Campbellton area in late May, linked to a medical doctor who returned from a trip to Quebec. 41 individuals were infected during this outbreak and led to two deaths.

In June 2020, PEI Premier Dennis King suggested that travel between provinces in the Atlantic region might be allowed, as early as the beginning of July. King claimed there was an agreement to this end, in a discussion held on June 10 between the Premiers. When asked by the CBC, the other Premiers expressed caution on an "Atlantic bubble."

One travel-related case was reported on July 9 in the Fredericton region.

On October 7, 2020, 17 cases were announced at Notre-Dame Manor, a special-care home in Moncton.

On September 24, 2021, New Brunswick health officials announced a record-breaking single day increase of 78 new COVID-19 cases, along with 3 more deaths, bringing the death total to 52 since the start of the pandemic. However, on September 26, 2021, this record was broken again with health officials reporting 82 new infections. On September 30, 2021, health officials announced 99 new infections, the highest number of new infections since the pandemic began.

On October 2, 2021, the province recorded 140 new COVID-19 cases, with 49 recoveries and four deaths, bringing the active number of cases in New Brunswick to 764, breaking the previous record of 99 new cases on September 30, 2021. Hospitalizations in the province rose to 44, with 17 in ICU.

On October 5, 2021, officials in New Brunswick announced that starting October 8, 2021, at 11:59pm, New Brunswick's health zones 1, the northern portion of zone 3 from Deerville and Florenceville-Bristol, and all of zone 4 will enter a two-week circuit breaker.

== Government response ==
On March 13, the provincial government announced that all New Brunswick schools would shut down until March 29. Daycares were not affected by the announcement at the time but were closed three days later. On March 16, the chief medical officer of health Dr. Jennifer Russell recommended that all public spaces and certain business should close starting on March 17. They are also asking restaurant owners to limit the number of customers to half of the capacity of their dining areas. Take-out orders, deliveries and drive-through services would be permitted. The government also announced that all non-essential government services will shut down until further notice.

On March 19, the province declared a state of emergency.

On July 3, the province along with the three other Atlantic provinces (Newfoundland and Labrador, Prince Edward Island and Nova Scotia) lifted travel restrictions among themselves to form the Atlantic Bubble, allowing residents within the four provinces to travel without self-isolate for 14 days.
