= Robert Strang (physician) =

Chief Medical Officer of Health for Nova Scotia

Dr. Robert Strang ONS
- Born: 1959 (age 66–67); Southern Rhodesia
- Education: University of British Columbia
- Occupations: Chief Medical Officer of Health (CMO), Nova Scotia
- Known for: CMO during COVID-19 pandemic in Nova Scotia

Robert Strang ONS (born 1959) is a Canadian physician and the chief medical officer for the province of Nova Scotia. Before becoming a doctor, Strang played rugby union for the Canada men's national rugby union team until retiring in 1991.

== Early life, rugby union career, and education ==
Born in Southern Rhodesia, now Zimbabwe, Strang and his family moved to Fredericton, New Brunswick when he was five years old. Strang began playing rugby union in high school and played for the University of British Columbia's rugby team. He later played in New Zealand, but returned to Canada in the early 1980s to play for the Canada men's national rugby union team. While on the team, he played against the England national rugby union team at Twickenham Stadium. Strang retired as a player in 1991.

He received a medical degree from University of British Columbia (UBC) in 1990 and completed family practice residency in 1992 and community medicine residency in 1997 at UBC. He also received from UBC a Bachelor of Science and Bachelor of Physical Education.

== Medical career ==
In 1994, Strang became a team doctor for the Canada men's national rugby union team. From 1997 to 1999, Strang was an Associate Medical Officer of Health in the Canadian province of British Columbia. In 1999, Strang moved to Nova Scotia, and continued his career in Halifax, Nova Scotia, where he became the Medical Officer of Health of Capital District Health Authority, the largest health authority of the province, later merged into the new Nova Scotia Health Authority. He held the position until 2007.

=== Chief Medical Officer of Health of Nova Scotia ===
In 2007, Strang was appointed Chief Public Health Official of Nova Scotia. He was announced in that newly created role on 23 August 2007. The position was renamed Chief medical officer of Health by the province in late 2016.In that role, Strang has been an anti-smoking advocate and an outspoken critic of pseudoscience and misinformation related to the COVID-19 pandemic. In 2018, he was with Theresa Tam the co-chair of the special advisory committee on the epidemic of opioid overdoses in Canada.

==== COVID-19 pandemic ====
Since 15 March 2020, Strang has provided daily updates on the COVID-19 pandemic in Nova Scotia. He became Nova Scotia's public health lead communicator on matters related to the COVID-19 pandemic in Nova Scotia. In daily press conferences, he provides updates on the COVID-19 pandemic and the public health effort to respond to it.

In December 2020, Strang was awarded the Lieutenant-Governor's Award for Excellence in Public Administration for his work during the pandemic.

In November 2020, The Rotary Club of Dartmouth, Nova Scotia presented Dr. Robert Strang with the coveted Paul Harris Fellowship Award. Two years later in March 2022, the Rotary Club of Middleton, Nova Scotia awarded Strang a second Paul Harris award and also honoured his fellow Pandemic leader, the former Premier of Nova Scotia, Stephen McNeil.

== Personal life ==
A married father of three, Strang has been living in Nova Scotia since 1999 and is a resident of the Halifax Regional Municipality. Strang was born with a cleft lip and cleft palate. Despite being retired from playing rugby union, Strang still referees matches. Strang became known for his tie collection during the COVID-19 pandemic in Nova Scotia, wearing a different tie to every briefing; a tree decorated with some of his ties raised $8250 at a charity auction for the Mental Health Foundation of Nova Scotia in December 2020.

== See also ==
- Healthcare in Canada
- Medical officer of health
