= Jennifer Russell (physician) =

New Brunswick Chief Medical Officer of Health

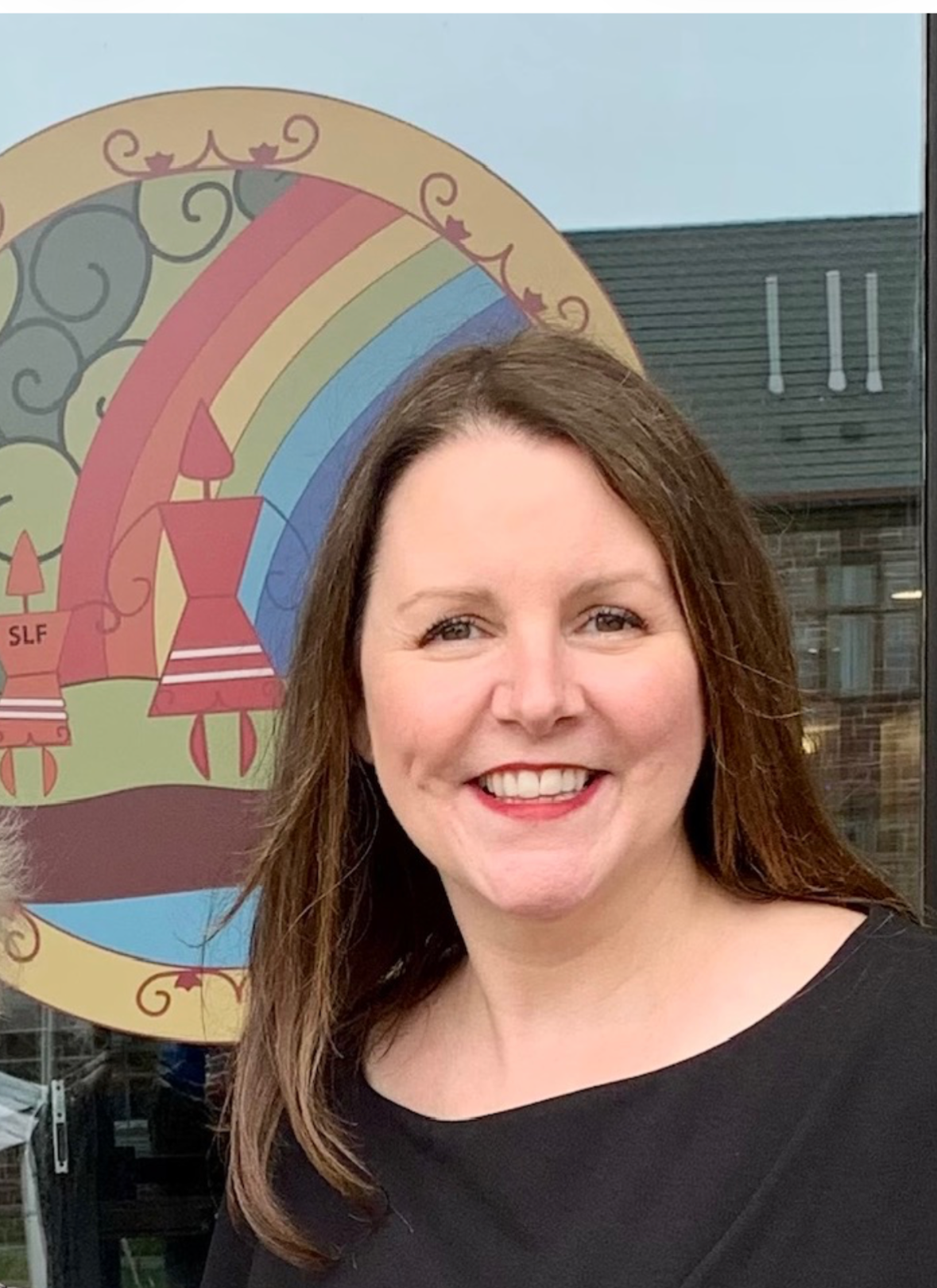

Chief Medical Officer of Health (New Brunswick)
- In office November 2015 – December 2023
- Preceded by: Eilish Cleary
- Succeeded by: Yves Léger

Personal details
- Born: Jennifer Wylie Bathurst, New Brunswick, Canada
- Education: Dalhousie University; University of New Brunswick; Memorial University of Newfoundland

Jennifer Russell ONB
- Born: Jennifer Wylie; Bathurst, New Brunswick, Canada
- Education: Dalhousie University; University of New Brunswick; Memorial University of Newfoundland
- Occupations: Chief Medical Officer of Health, New Brunswick
- Known for: CMO during COVID-19 pandemic in New Brunswick
- Medical career
- Profession: Chief Officer of Health
- Field: Public health
- Institutions: New Brunswick Ministry of Health

Jennifer Wylie-Russell ONB is a Canadian physician who was Chief Medical Officer of Health from 2015 to 2023 for the province of New Brunswick, Canada. Her handling of the COVID-19 pandemic in New Brunswick brought her widespread visibility in Canada.

== Early life ==
Russell enrolled in a Bachelor of Arts with major in Music at Dalhousie University in Nova Scotia. She graduated from Science at the University of New Brunswick in 1997, Medicine at Memorial University of Newfoundland and completed her residency in family medicine at Dalhousie University in 2001.

Russell joined the Canadian Armed Forces (CAF) while studying medicine, through the CAF's Medical Officer Training Program.

== Career ==
For half of Russell's ten years in the CAF, she served as Base Surgeon at Ottawa's National Defense Medical Clinic. She got involved in preventive medicine and immunization. Her years in the Forces also led her to Canadian Forces Base Gagetown and she was briefly deployed to Dubai in support to Canada's mission to Afghanistan in 2006.

Upon leaving the military, she worked briefly for Veterans Affairs Canada, then in family medicine and mental health at Fredericton, including six years at the Victoria Health Centre's methadone clinic.

Russell joined New Brunswick's public health department in August 2014 as Deputy Chief Medical Officer of Health. She was appointed Chief Medical Officer of Health in November 2015. She resigned in October 2023 effective December 8, 2023.

Russell was made a Member of the Order of New Brunswick in 2021.

=== COVID-19 Pandemic ===
Russell became a familiar public figure to New Brunswickers during the COVID-19 pandemic, as she took part in daily televised briefings, explaining the extent of the epidemic and the measures put forward by the government to fight it.

In addition to information about the pandemic, Russell frequently suggested to viewers ways to improve their well-being and mental health while in confinement. She asked people to set aside dearly-held traditions such as Easter family gatherings and maintain discipline to limit the spread of the virus, even though new Brunswick was doing better than adjacent jurisdictions. She led or participated in various initiatives to inform New Brunswickers, including a video in which she explains the concept of social distancing to children.

Russell makes good use of her proficiency in French, responding to questions in that language to convey information to the province's Acadian population.

== Music ==
Russell is a singer, composer and lyrics writer in swing and gospel music. She holds a Bachelor in Arts (music) from Dalhousie University, with an emphasis on the piano and saxophone. She sang and played with various bands throughout her studies: concert bands, a saxophone quartet, a Celtic band, a Jazz band with other medical students and the Nova Scotia Wind Ensemble. Talking about her lifelong artistic pursuits, she said in 2017: "Music is like breathing, I need music in my life".

In 2008, Russell was nominated for a Covenant Music Award (best Folk song of the year, jointly with Danny Crain), awarded by the Gospel Music Association Canada.

Her swing album, Double Kiss, came out in 2014. Her second swing album, Triple Step, was released in 2019 and was a fundraiser for Liberty Lane in Fredericton, New Brunswick.
