= Siobhán Cleary =

Irish composer

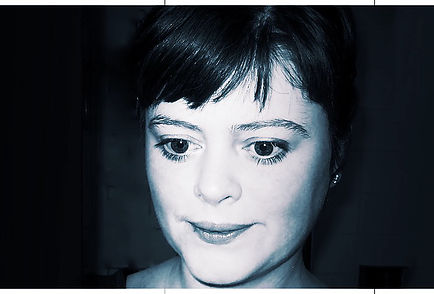
Siobhán Cleary

Siobhán Cleary (born 10 May 1970) is an Irish composer. Her works include the orchestral pieces Alchemy and Cokaygne, the choral work Theophilus Thistle and the Myth of Miss Muffett, and the opera Vampirella. She has also worked as a film composer, and is a member of Aosdána.

== Early life and education ==
Born in Dublin, Cleary started to compose from an early age, often writing pieces while she was supposed to be practising at the piano. When she began to study music at Maynooth University, she was initially inspired by Luciano Berio's Sinfonia, and soon afterwards by the works of the Irish composer Gerald Barry, the French Olivier Messiaen and the Hungarian György Ligeti. She continued her studies at Queen's University Belfast and Trinity College, Dublin. In 1994 she attended the Siena summer school, where she studied film music under Ennio Morricone and concert music under Franco Donatoni. She completed a master's degree in composition at Queen's University Belfast and a master's degree in music and media technology at Trinity College Dublin. In addition, she studied composition with the Dutch composer Louis Andriessen, and received private tuition from the American Tom Johnson and the South African Kevin Volans. She also studied film scoring with the American Don Brandon Ray.

== Composition ==
Inspired by the alchemists' Opus Alchymicum which describes how cheaper metals are transmuted into gold, Cleary's orchestral work Alchemy (2001) is, like the stages in the Opus, presented in four parts: it evolves from the slow nigrendo, the moderate albedo, the strong citronatus, and the burning rubedo. The work was performed by the RTÉ National Symphony Orchestra in January 2002.

Her tone poem Cokaygne (2009), which, like Alchemy, was commissioned by RTÉ for the National Symphony Orchestra, is based on a poem and old sources which evoke a land of extreme luxury and contentment. The elaborately orchestrated piece was performed by the RTÉ National Symphony Orchestra in November 2009, Vladimir Altschuler conducting. It was performed by the RTÉNSO once again in June 2016, this time under the baton of Alan Buribayev.

Cleary's choral work Theophilus Thistle and the Myth of Miss Muffett (2010), commissioned by the Cork International Choral Festival, was first performed on 27 April 2011 at the festival by the National Chamber Choir, conducted by Paul Hillier. The work is based on a series of tongue twisters and other strange combinations of words popular in various European languages and dialects, moving from Italy, through Germany and Spain, finishing in Ireland. In 2013, it was performed twice by Chamber Choir Ireland in Dublin and Cork in connection with Ireland's presidency of the European Union. The journalist and music critic Terry Blain commented on the choir's "dazzlingly virtuosic performance" in Belfast in 2013, qualifying the piece as "a tour de force of 21st-century vocal chicanery, a clever and richly entertaining composition". Theophilus Thistle was also performed the same year in the United States as part of the "Imagine Ireland" festival.

Hum!, a collaboration with the writer Gerard Beirne, was commissioned and premiered by the Irish Chamber Orchestra under Fionnuala Hunt.

The chamber opera Vampirella with a libretto by Katy Hayes was first performed by students from the Royal Irish Academy of Music and the Lir National Academy of Dramatic Art at Dublin's Smock Alley Theatre in March 2017. Based on a short story by Angela Carter telling how a young English soldier is seduced by a vampire countess, it was directed by Conor Hanratty and conducted by Andrew Synnott. Michael Dervan of The Irish Times found the electronic sounds in the score particularly effective, commenting: "Perhaps this is a case of a genuinely electronic opera trying to break out of a more conventional mold."

== Career ==
Cleary has also worked as a film composer, scoring the Roger Corman feature films Spacejacked! and Dangerous Curves, as well as other film and documentary projects. In 2005, she founded Ireland Promoting New Music and curated its NewSoundWorlds series. In 2015, she founded the Evlana Ensemble and Sinfonietta, of which she has served as artistic director.

== Awards ==
In 1995, Cleary was a finalist in the Yorkshire and Humberside Arts Young Composers' Award at the Huddersfield Contemporary Music Festival. In 1996, Cleary received a young artists award from Pépinières européennes pour jeunes artistes, followed in 1997 by the first prize in the Arklow Music Festival Composers' Competition. In 2008, she was invited to become a member of Aosdána, an Irish association of creative artists.
