= COVID-19 pandemic in Canada =

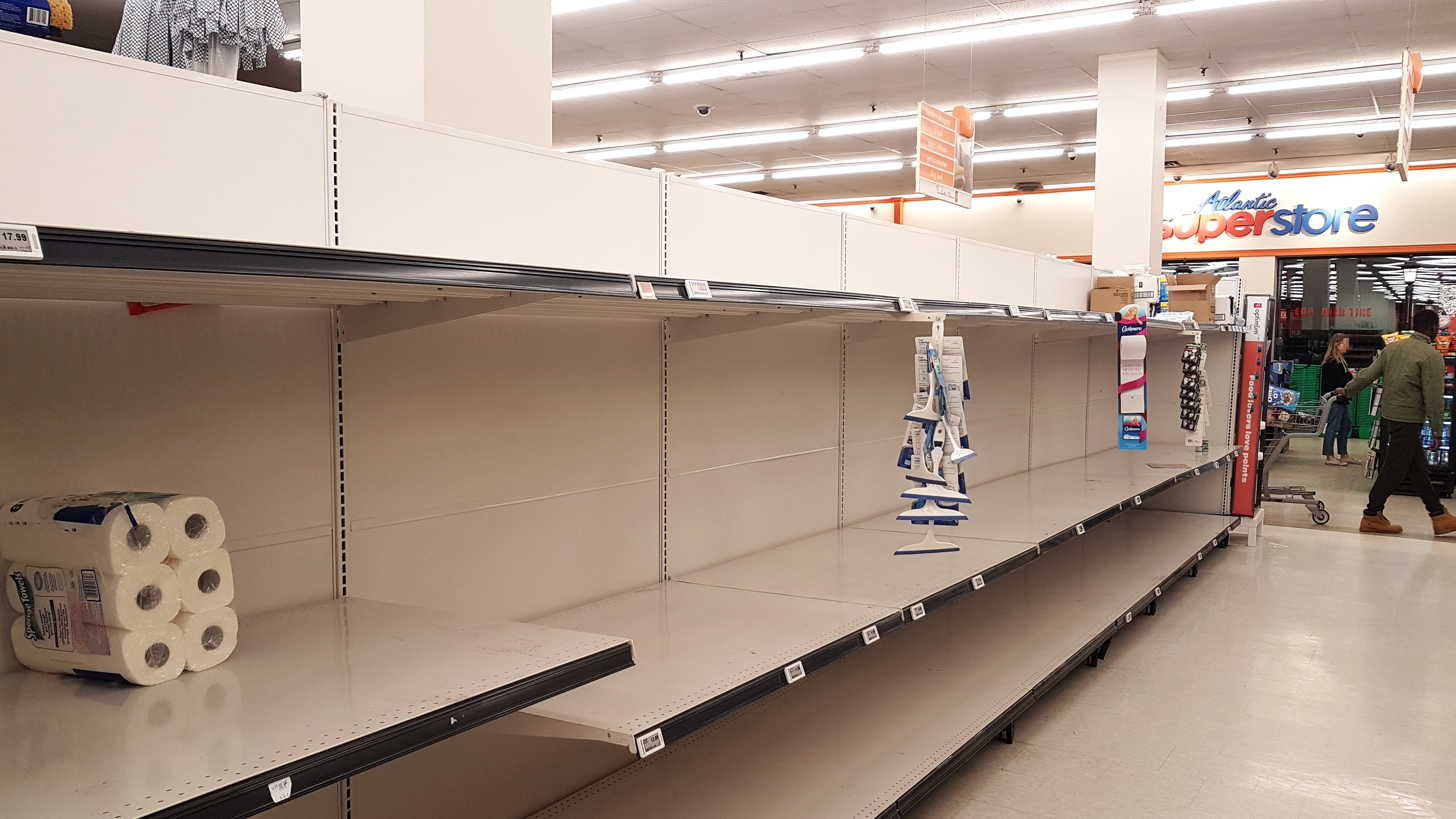
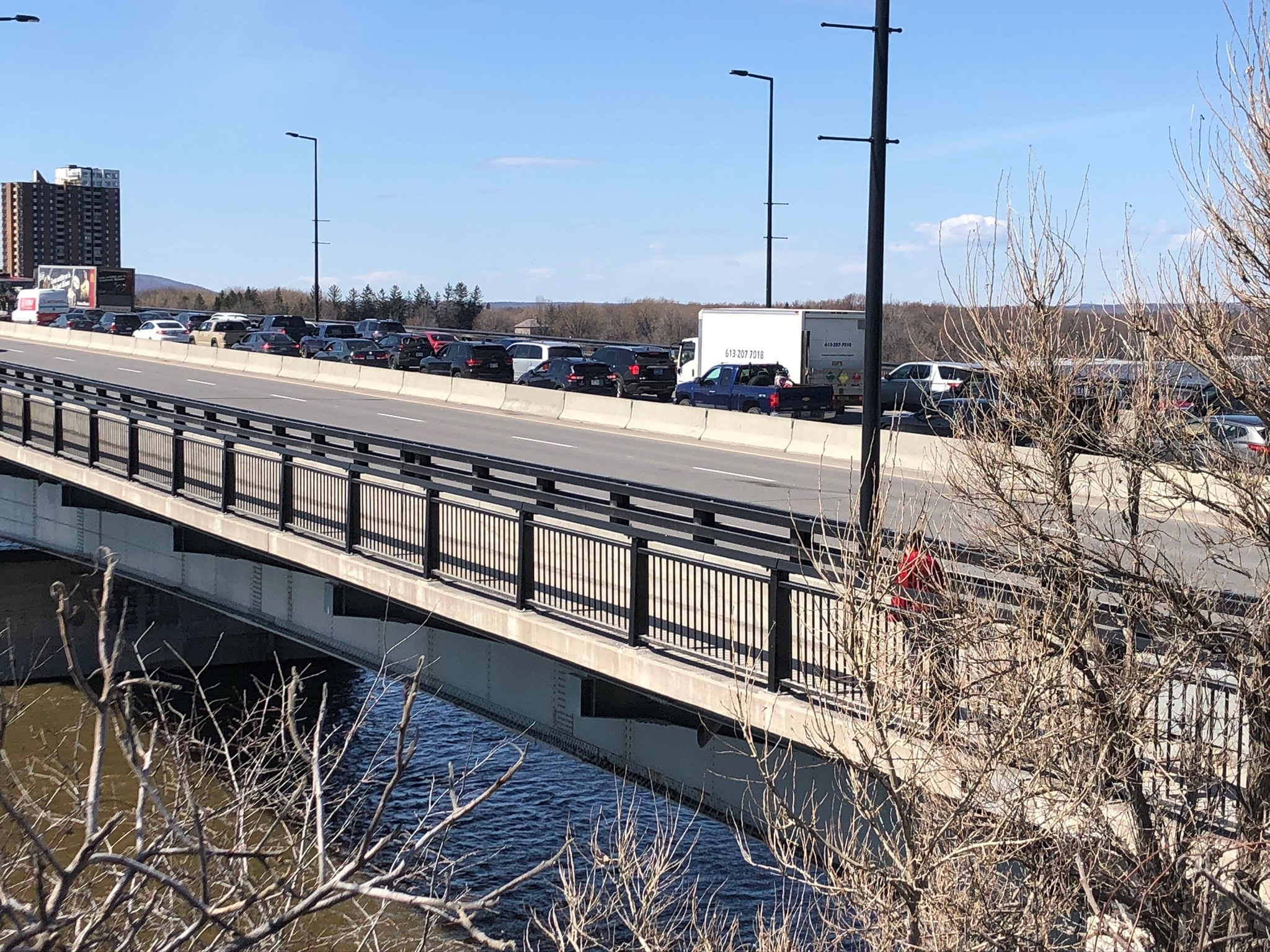
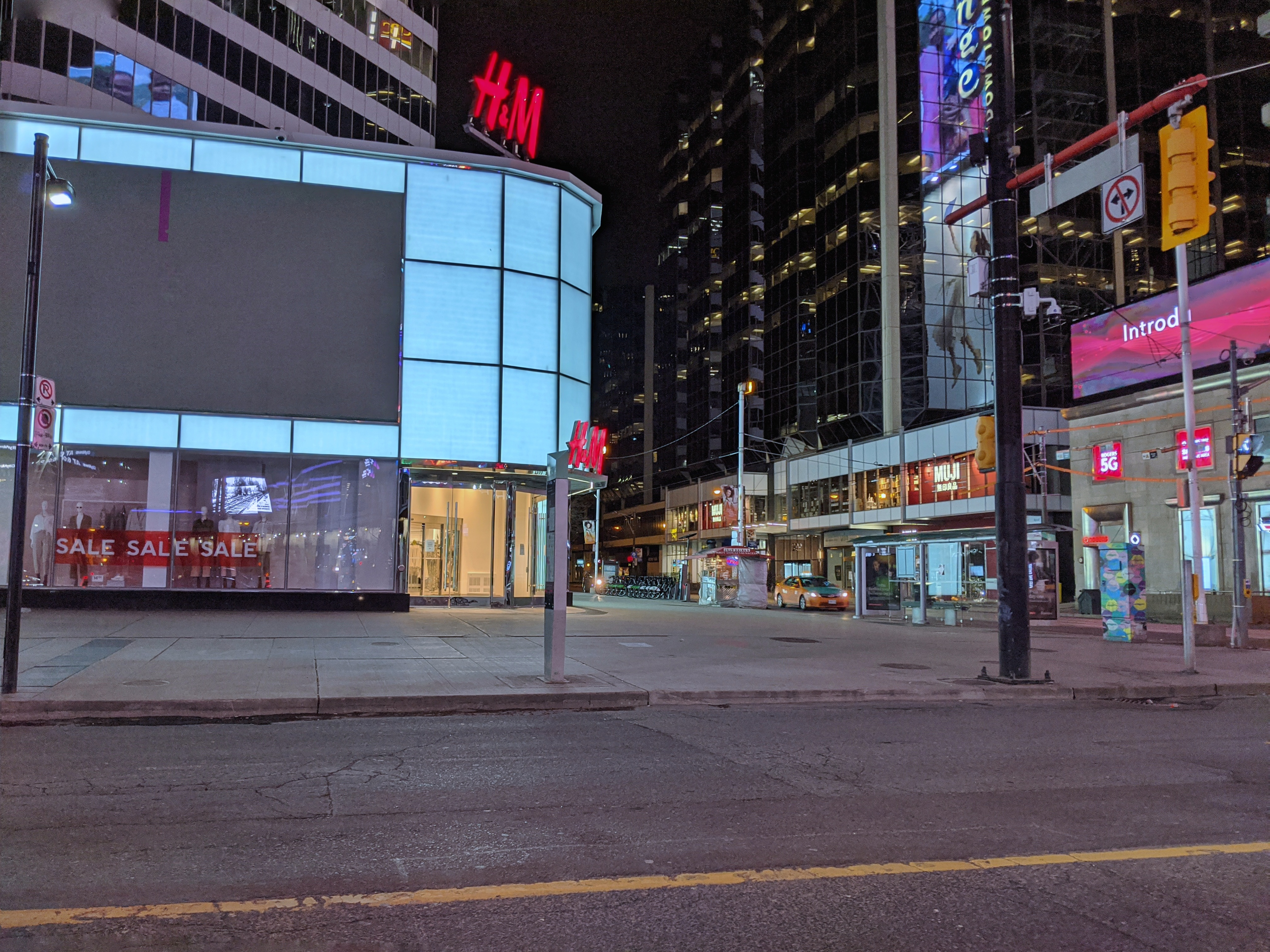
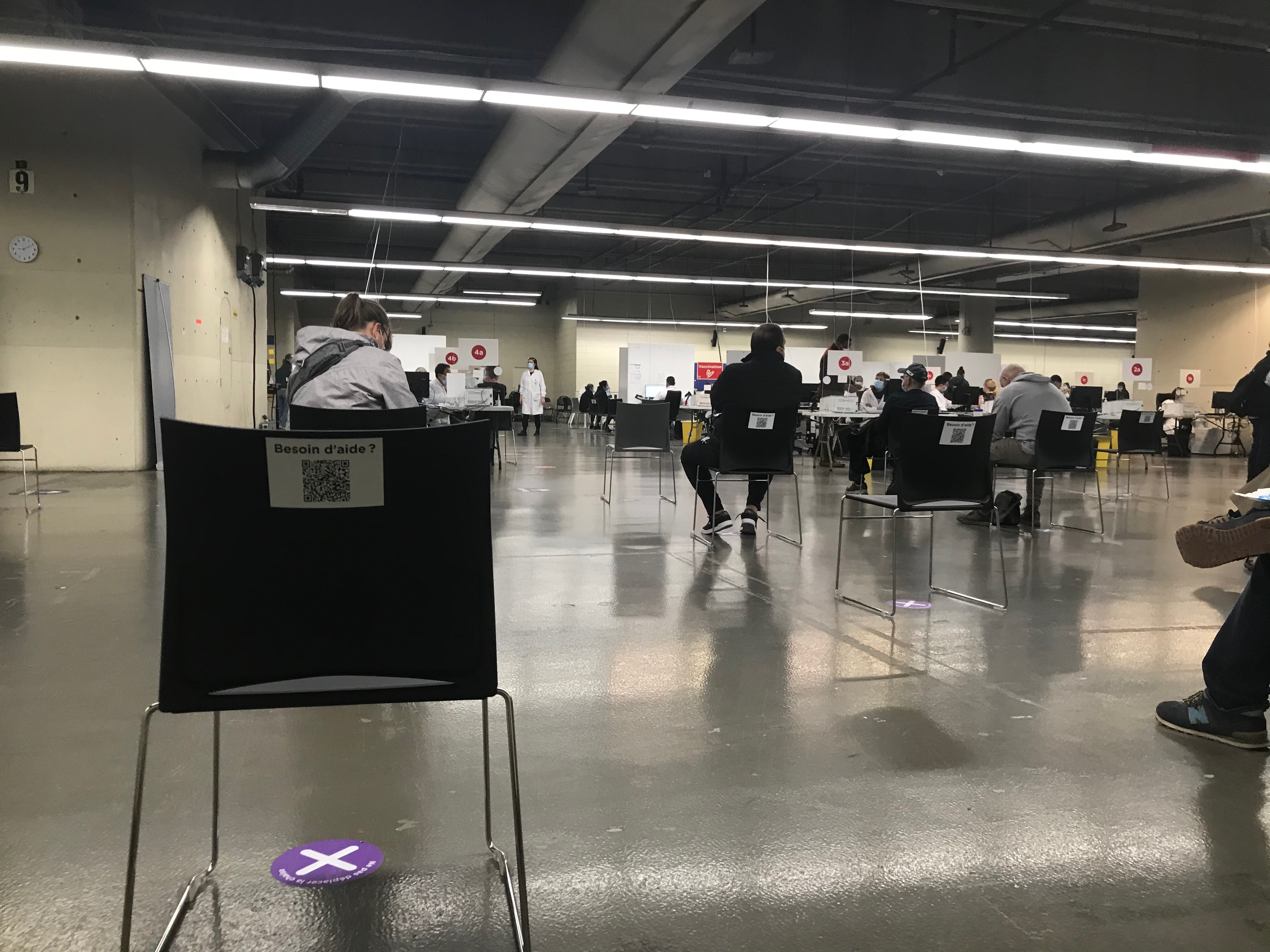
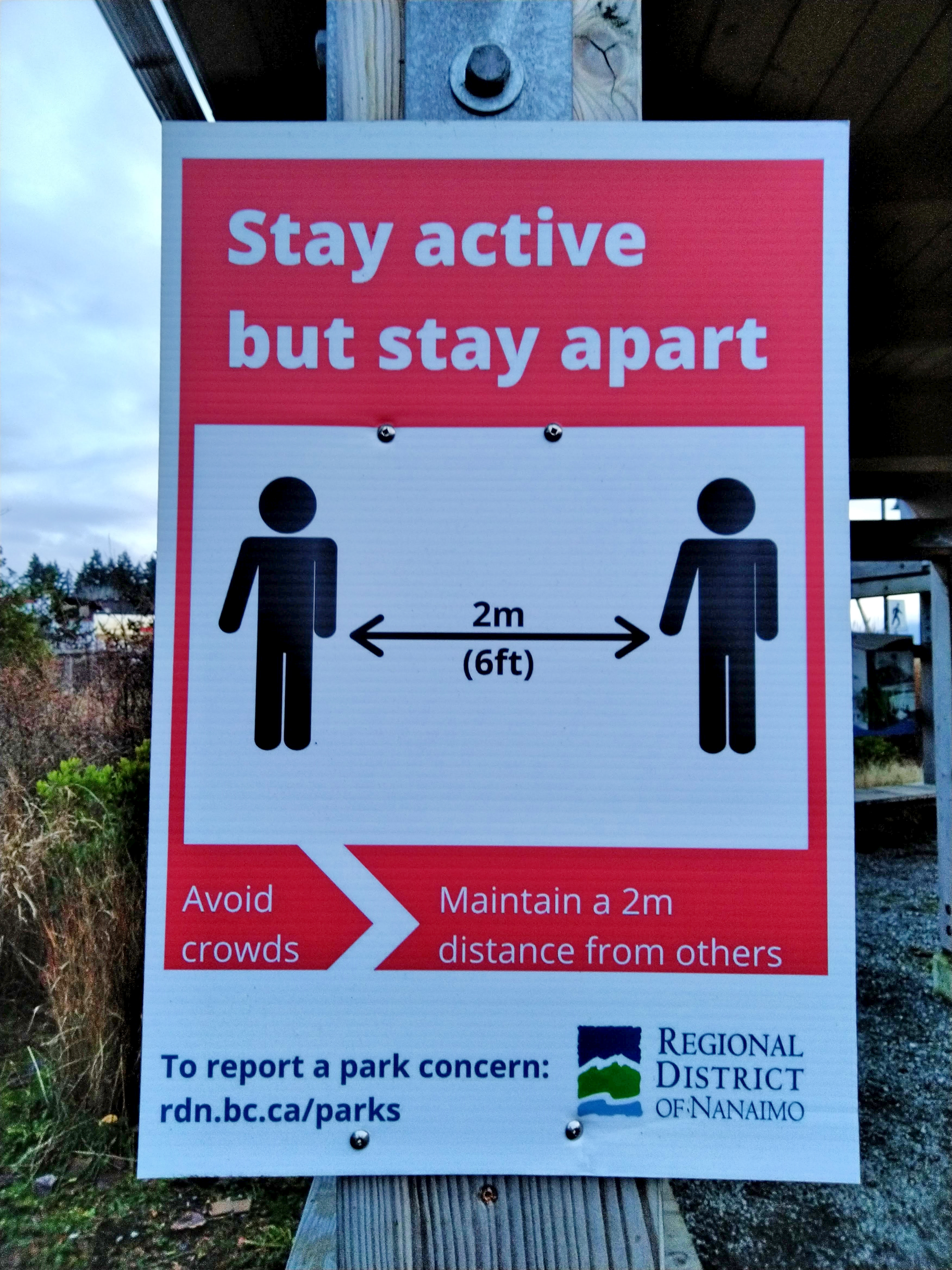
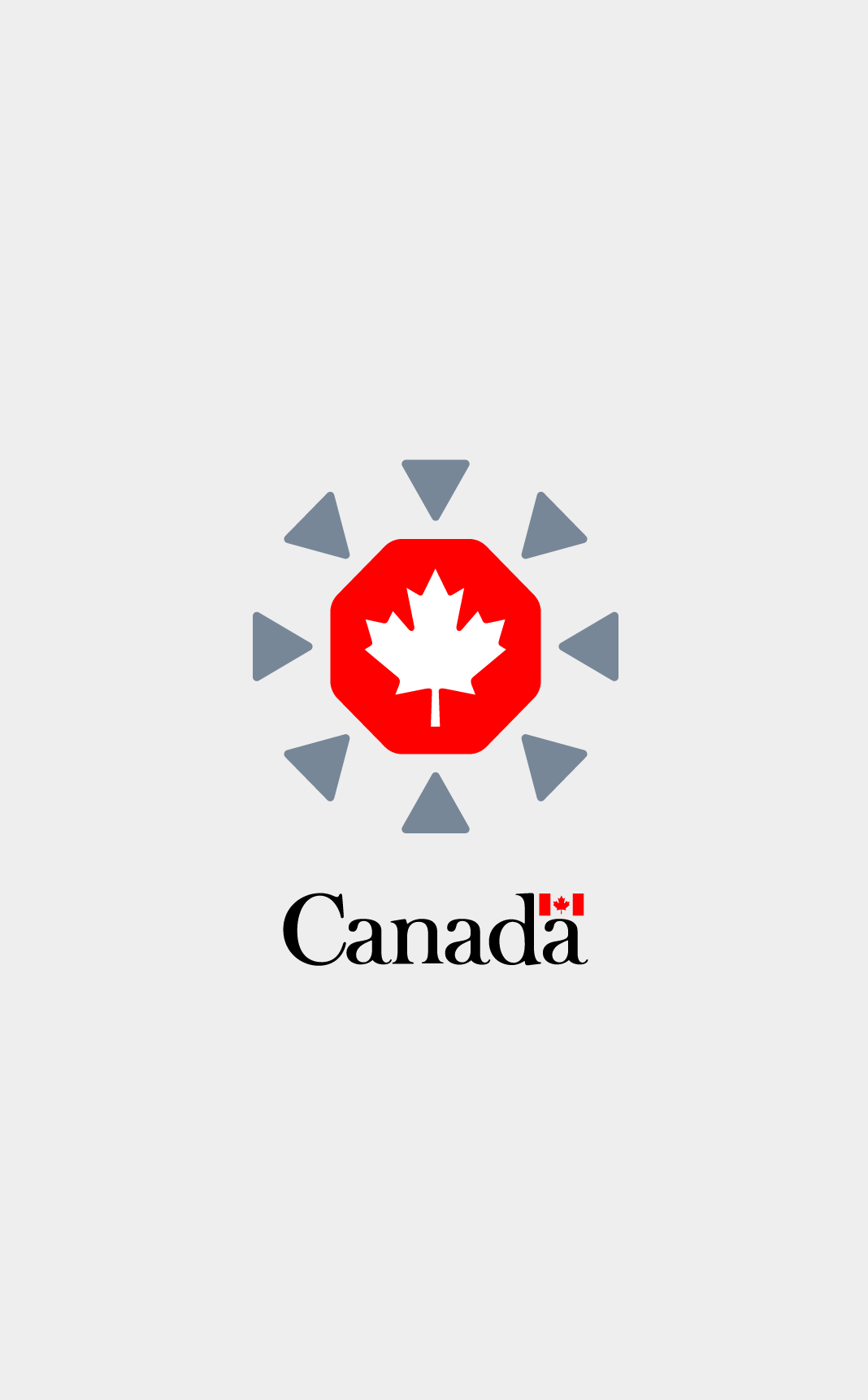
- (clockwise from top): The results of panic buying in Halifax, Nova Scotia; Quebec police stop vehicles on the Macdonald-Cartier Bridge; Mass-vaccination site at the Olympic Stadium in Montreal, Quebec; The COVID Alert app developed by Shopify and Health Canada; A sign encouraging social distancing in Nanaimo, British Columbia; An empty Yonge–Dundas Square (now Sankofa Square) in Toronto
- Disease: COVID-19
- Pathogen: SARS-CoV-2
- Location: Canada
- First outbreak: Wuhan, Hubei, China
- Index case: Toronto, Ontario
- Arrival date: January 25, 2020 (6 years, 9 months and 4 weeks)
- Confirmed cases: 5,232,638 (as of May 22, 2026): * It is estimated that most cases have gone unreported and that at least 75% of people in Canada were infected with at least one of the COVID-19 variants by mid-2023.
- Deaths: 65,118 (as of May 22, 2026)
- Fatality rate: 1.20% (as of May 25, 2024), unknown after that date
- Vaccinations: Vaccinated: 32,320,750 (83.00%): - One dose only: 137,295 (0.35%); - Two doses only: 12,868,886 (33.05%); - Three doses only: 13,746,054 (35.30%); - Four doses: 5,568,515 (14.30%); Non-vaccinated: 6,619,913 (17.00%); * On November 12, 2022, the PHAC transitioned to a new system of collecting data on vaccinated persons. This data is much less detailed and provides no overview regarding how many persons have had one, two, three, or four doses (or more), rendering further updates on this data set impossible.

Government website
- canada.ca/coronavirus

The COVID-19 pandemic in Canada is part of the worldwide pandemic of coronavirus disease 2019 (COVID-19) which was declared by the World Health Organization on March 11, 2020. It is caused by severe acute respiratory syndrome coronavirus 2 (SARS-CoV-2). Most cases over the course of the pandemic have been in Ontario, Quebec, British Columbia and Alberta. Confirmed cases have been reported in all of Canada's provinces and territories. Statistics (see below) show that COVID-19 has drastically declined in 2026, and now seems to be less dangerous than influenza.

The virus was confirmed to have reached Canada on January 25, 2020, after an individual who had returned to Toronto from Wuhan, Hubei, China, tested positive. The first case of community transmission in Canada was confirmed in British Columbia on March 5. In March 2020, as cases of community transmission were confirmed, all of Canada's provinces and territories declared states of emergency. Provinces and territories implemented, to varying degrees, school and daycare closures, prohibitions on gatherings, closures of non-essential businesses and restrictions on entry. Canada severely restricted its border access, barring travelers from all countries with some exceptions. The federal Minister of Health invoked the Quarantine Act, introduced following the 2002–2004 SARS outbreak. For the first time in its legislative history, the act was used, legally requiring all travelers (excluding essential workers) returning to the country to self-isolate for 14 days, until rules were changed to accommodate fully vaccinated travelers.

By mid to late summer of 2020, the country saw a steady decline in active cases until the beginning of late summer. In July, the four Atlantic provinces formed the Atlantic Bubble, which allowed unrestricted movement for provincial residents. Through autumn, there was a resurgence of cases in all provinces and territories. On September 23, 2020, Prime Minister Trudeau declared that Canada was experiencing a "second wave" of the virus. New restrictions from provincial governments were put in place once again as cases increased, including variations of regional lockdowns. In late November, the Atlantic Bubble was disbanded because of the second wave. The federal government passed legislation to approve further modified economic aid for businesses and individuals.

Nation-wide cases, hospitalizations and deaths spiked during and after the Christmas and holiday season in December, 2020 and January, 2021. Alarmed by hospital capacity issues, fatalities and new cases, heavy restrictions (such as lockdowns and curfews) were put in place in affected areas (primarily Ontario, Quebec, and Alberta) and across the country. These lockdowns caused active cases to steadily decline, reaching a plateau in active cases in mid-February 2021. During a third wave of the virus, cases began rising across most provinces west of Atlantic Canada in mid-March, prompting further lockdowns and restrictions in the most populous provinces of Ontario and Quebec. Due to a relatively low volume of cases in the Atlantic provinces, the travel-restricted Atlantic Bubble was planned to reopen; however, in late April, the third wave had spread to the Atlantic provinces. In response, Newfoundland and Labrador, Prince Edward Island, and Nova Scotia reinstated travel bans toward the rest of the country.

Following Health Canada's approval of the Pfizer–BioNTech COVID-19 vaccine, and later the mRNA-1273 vaccine developed by Moderna, mass vaccinations began nationwide on December 14, 2020. On February 26, 2021, Health Canada approved the Oxford–AstraZeneca COVID-19 vaccine for use, and on March 5, 2021, they additionally approved the Janssen COVID-19 vaccine for a total of four approved vaccines in the nation. However, most provinces discontinued first doses of Oxford-AstraZeneca by May 12, 2021, while the administration of the Janssen vaccine was determined unnecessary. Canada became one of the most vaccinated countries in the world, with a continually high uptake of the vaccine. Despite high general uptake of the vaccine, cases began to surge particularly amongst the unvaccinated population in provinces like Alberta, which had removed nearly all pandemic restrictions.

Near the end of summer 2021, cases surged across Canada, particularly in British Columbia, Alberta, Quebec and Ontario, described as a "pandemic of the unvaccinated". A July 2021 PHAC epidemiology report said that those who were unvaccinated represented almost 90% of COVID cases reported. This fourth wave led to the reinstatement of pandemic restrictions like mask mandates in provinces such as British Columbia and Alberta. Consequently, vaccine passports were introduced in all provinces and two territories. Federally, Prime Minister Justin Trudeau implemented vaccination requirements for air travel, Via Rail and Rocky Mountaineer trains, and federally regulated workers, effective October 30, 2021.

In January 2022, all of Canada's provinces and territories were experiencing record-level case numbers, primarily driven by the Omicron variant, which caused provincial and territorial governments to reintroduce restrictions surrounding travel and isolation. However, in mid-February active caseloads and hospitalizations began to decrease and towards the end of February 2022, almost all provinces and territories had announced plans to lift restrictions by early March or mid-March 2022, if epidemiology remained favorable. By March 2022, more than 85% of Canadians aged five and over were fully vaccinated.

== Background and epidemiology ==
On January 12, 2020, the World Health Organization (WHO) confirmed that a novel coronavirus was the cause of a respiratory illness in a cluster of people in Wuhan, Hubei, China, reported to the WHO on December 31, 2019.

The case fatality ratio for COVID-19 was much lower than SARS of 2003, but the transmission was significantly greater, with a significant death toll.

COVID-19 pandemic in Canada by province and territory, 21 November 2026, 14:00 UTC
Province	Population	Tests	Per k	Cases	Per m	Deaths	Per m	Modified
British Columbia	5,722,457	7,009,554	1,224.9	444,458	77,669	8,379	1,464.2	2026-11-21
Alberta	5,122,055	8,220,019	1,604.8	671,532	131,106	7,122	1,390.5	2026-11-21
Saskatchewan	1,282,899	2,022,370	1,576.4	177,227	138,146	2,106	1,641.6	2026-11-21
Manitoba	1,521,808	1,886,390	1,239.6	175,410	115,264	3,168	2,081.7	2026-11-21
Ontario	16,300,849	28,628,527	1,756.3	1,792,089	109,939	19,486	1,195.4	2026-11-21
Quebec	9,081,610	21,779,648	2,398.2	1,561,330	171,922	21,928	2,414.5	2026-11-21
New Brunswick	886,360	1,209,955	1,365.1	106,723	120,406	1,197	1,350.5	2026-11-21
Prince Edward Island	183,140	366,541	2001.4	59,794	326,493	161	879.1	2026-11-21
Nova Scotia	1,105,543	2,372,012	2,145.6	164,945	149,198	1,319	1,193.1	2026-11-21
Newfoundland and Labrador	553,369	837,596	1,513.6	63,709	115,129	451	815	2026-11-21
Yukon	50,735	44,737	881.8	5,491	108,229	50	985.5	2026-11-21
Northwest Territories	45,756	48,855	1,067.7	12,072	263,834	25	(Note: New cases not recorded since 2022)546.4	2026-11-21
Nunavut	43,419	64,706	1,490.3	5,224	120,316	10	(Note: New cases not recorded since 2022)230.3	2026-11-21
Repatriated travellers	N/A	N/A	N/A	13	N/A	0	N/A	2020
Canada	41,900,000	74,490,910	1,777.8	5,240,017	125,060	65,402	1,560.9	2026-11-21

== Preparations ==
On January 1, 2020, the WHO set up the IMST (Incident Management Support Team) across all three levels of the organization: headquarters, regional headquarters and country-level, putting the organization on an emergency footing for dealing with the outbreak.

On January 7, when it appeared that there was a health crisis emerging in Wuhan, Public Health Canada advised travelers to China to avoid contact with animals, noting that they were very carefully monitoring the situation. Still there was no evidence of what caused the illness, or how it spread.

On January 15, the federal government activated its Emergency Operations Centre.

On January 17, the Canada Border Services Agency (CBSA) indicated plans were in progress "to implement signage" in the Montreal, Toronto, and Vancouver airports to raise awareness of the virus. An additional health screening question added to the electronic kiosks for passengers arriving from central China. The agency noted the overall risk to Canadians was low, and there were no direct flights from Wuhan to Canada. The CBSA said it would not be, at that time, implementing extra screening measures, but would "monitor the situation closely".

On January 23, the federal Minister of Health, Patty Hajdu, said they were monitoring five or six people for signs of the virus. That same day, the chief public health officer of Canada, Theresa Tam, was a member of the WHO committee that broadcast that it was too early to declare a Public Health Emergency of International Concern.

Initially, Canada faced a shortage of personal protective equipment, as the Trudeau government had reduced PPE funding as a cost-cutting measure in previous years.

== Vaccination ==
Health Canada is responsible for approval and regulation of vaccines (and other pharmaceuticals), while the Public Health Agency of Canada (PHAC) is responsible for public health, emergency preparedness and response, and infectious and chronic disease control and prevention. Vaccines are authorized by Health Canada, purchased by the Government of Canada and distributed by PHAC to individual provinces and territories in tranches based on various factors such as population size and prioritized peoples. The National Advisory Committee on Immunization (NACI) has also issued recommendations on how vaccines should be distributed, in what intervals and to which populations. NACI has also been involved in recommendations on the use or disuse of vaccines to certain ages or populations.

The National Research Council Canada (NRC) has made investments in the domestic development of vaccine candidates, including candidates by the University of Saskatchewan and Variation Biotechnologies. In May 2020, the NRC announced a planned agreement to conduct clinical trials of a vaccine candidate by Chinese company CanSino Biologics, and plans to manufacture it at its facilities in Montreal once authorized. However, the deal collapsed due to strained Canada–China relations, and the federal government later announced commitments to purchase vaccines being produced by AstraZeneca, Moderna, Pfizer and Janssen.

== Variants of concern ==
On December 26, 2020, Ontario announced that two cases of the B.1.1.7 variant had been found in Durham. On January 8, 2021, the Public Health Agency of Canada announced that the first case of the South African variant had been found in Alberta. On February 8, CTV reported that the first case of the P.1 variant out of Brazil had been detected in Toronto. On April 21, the B.C. Ministry of Health announced that they had seen cases of B.1.617 as early as April 4. On May 14, Canada added B.1.617 (including what is now known as Delta) to its variants of concern. On May 31, 2021, WHO announced that the variant B.1.1.7 was being renamed Alpha, P.1 Gamma, B.1.617.2 Delta and B.1.351 Beta.

Early evidence out of Alberta suggested that the Pfizer and Moderna vaccines would continue to be effective against death or hospitalization from the Alpha and Gamma variants. A study in Ontario found that the Pfizer vaccine was 95% effective to prevent hospitalization or death from the Alpha, Beta and Gamma variants 7 days after the second dose. Moderna was 94% effective against Alpha 7 days after the 2nd dose. Moderna appeared to be highly effective against Delta.

A preprint study from epidemiologists David Fisman and Ashleigh Tuite, at the University of Toronto, found that the Delta variant had a 120% greater risk of hospitalization, 287% greater risk of ICU admission and 137% greater risk of death compared to non-variant of concern strains of SARS-COV-2.

Number of cases by different variants (as of December 31, 2021)
Variant of concern	Number of cases	Percentage of all cases
Alpha	268,258	39.59%
Delta	211,644	31.24%
Omicron	174,248	25.72%
Gamma	20,979	3.09%
Beta	2,416	0.36%
Total included in this data set	677,545	Analysis has been made available only for the 13.65% of all 4,964,587 cases
Note: * The PHAC's stopped providing updates on variants on December 31, 2021.

Over the five years (2020-2024), five main variants have been recorded, with hundreds of different lineages, sublineages, recombinants, and mutations.

== Government response ==
=== Federal ===
As the people of Canada experience profound and rapid changes to their lives, we are all concerned about the future. It may be difficult to remain hopeful when faced with loss and uncertainty, but Canadians have many reasons for optimism, even in the most trying times.

Across Canada, countless people continue to care for the most vulnerable and to provide essential services for their fellow citizens. I am thankful for their dedication and for the hope it offers.

In the coming weeks and months, the people of Canada will need to continue to work together to ensure the health and vitality of our communities. I know that Canadians will remain optimistic and will rise to the challenges ahead.

My thoughts and prayers are with the people of Canada at this time."

— Elizabeth II, Queen of Canada, April 5, 2020

==== Public health ====
The federal government activated its Emergency Operations Centre on January 15, 2020. The federal government's pandemic response was based on two primary documents: the Canadian Pandemic Influenza Preparedness planning guidelines, which outlines risks and measures to address a viral disease, and the Federal/Provincial/Territorial Public Health Response Plan for Biological Events, which includes identifying, tracking, and ensuring rapid access to medical care. By February 27, the response plan was at level 3 (escalated).

On March 18, the federal Minister of Health, Patty Hajdu, announced that the federal government had signed an interim order to speed up access to COVID-19 test kits that would allow provincial labs to increase testing. The test kits were made by Switzerland-based Roche Molecular Systems and Thermo Fisher Scientific.

Several research projects were provided federal funding to develop and implement measures to detect, manage, and reduce the transmission of COVID-19. On March 11, Trudeau announced $275 million in funding for 47 projects. On March 19, the federal government announced funding for an additional 49 projects to bring the total to 96.

On March 20, Trudeau stated that the National Research Council would work with small- and medium-sized companies on health research to fight the virus, as part of the announcement on Canada's industrial strategy (see below).

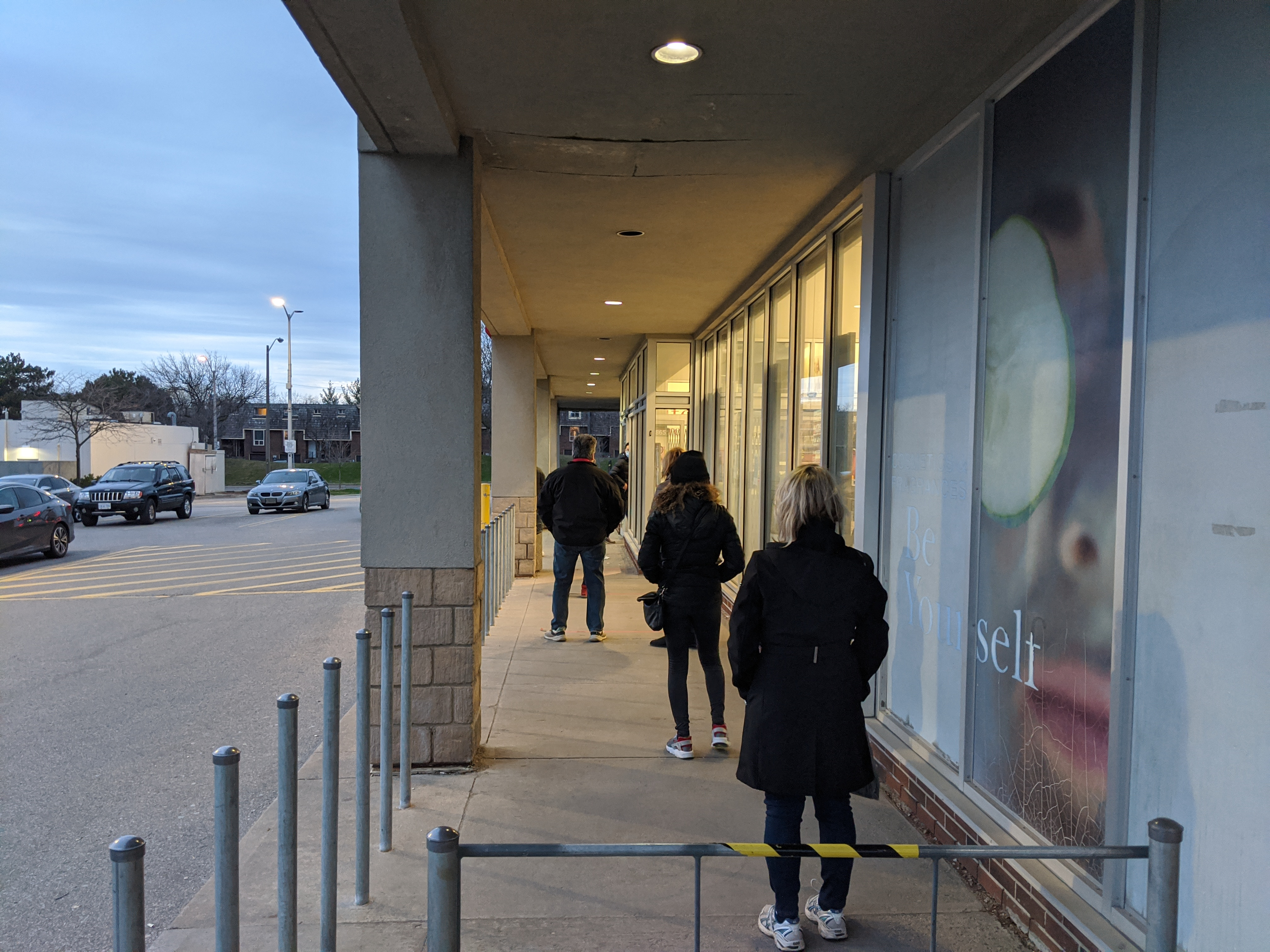
Social distancing at Shoppers Drug Mart in Toronto with limited number of shoppers allowed inside the store.

On March 23, Theresa Tam began appearing in public service announcements on radio and television, urging personal hygiene, social distancing, and against unnecessary travel.

On April 6, Tam began to suggest that the use of non-medical face masks in public could be an "additional measure" of protection. She stated to "protect others around you in situations where physical distancing is difficult to maintain", but that this is not proven to protect the wearer and is considered complementary to all existing health guidance issued thus far.

In response to backlogs in COVID-19 testing, especially provinces like Ontario, Health Canada approved new rapid testing for the virus.

On November 3, the Public Health Agency of Canada started recommended that people wear non-medical masks with three layers including a filter. Tam said that "living with COVID-19 is something that we have to do because it's not going to immediately disappear and the population doesn't have much immunity", and went on to say that "If cases do occur and accelerate in a community, then you have to get at it early because if you let it, the virus and the numbers accelerate and keep accelerating...you will then end up with more widespread closures. So, I think as cities or hotspots cool down, if you like, the restart needs to be carefully thought of."

==== Long-term care homes ====
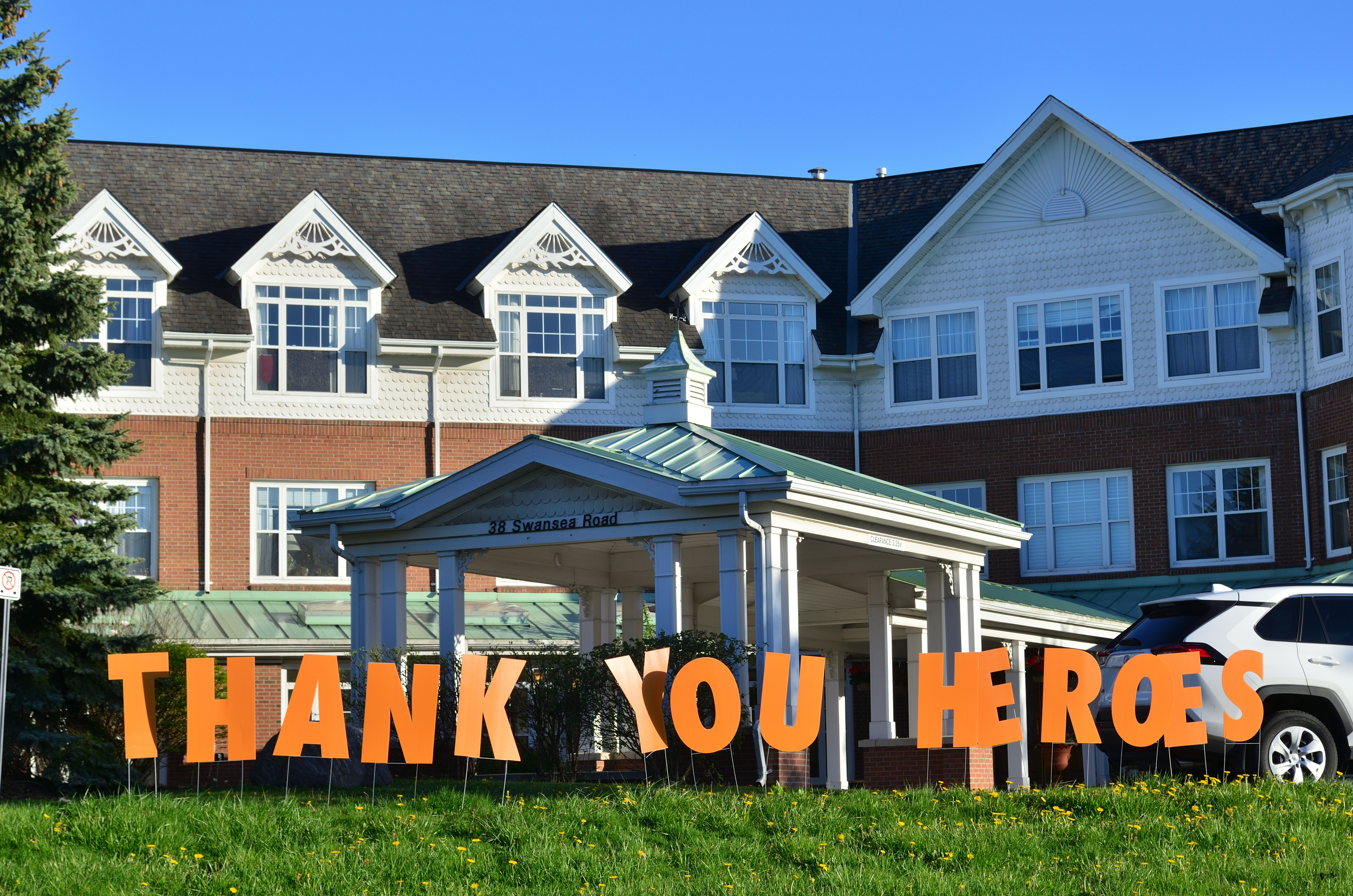
Sign at a long-term care home in Markham, Ontario

Long-term care homes were impacted heavily by the pandemic. On April 13, Tam reported that at least half of COVID-19 deaths in Canada were linked to long-term care homes (with the exact number varying by province), and that those deaths would continue to increase even as the transmission rate decreased. Tam cited factors such as outside visitors, communal living spaces, and staff being transferred among multiple facilities as particular vulnerabilities. The pandemic exacerbated pre-existing staffing issues at some facilities, including underpaid staff and being understaffed in general. On April 28, Tam stated that as many as 79 percent of Canada's COVID-19 fatalities occurred in long-term care homes.

Health Canada issued recommendations for long-term care homes. They were encouraged to restrict outside visitors and volunteers, restrict employees from being transferred between multiple facilities, provide personal protective equipment, enforce physical distancing during meals, screen staff and essential visitors. On April 15, Trudeau announced that the federal government planned to provide additional pay to long-term care workers.

==== Canadian Armed Forces ====
In April 2020, the Department of National Defence gave the provinces the option to get Canadian Armed Forces assistance in combating the pandemic in long-term care facilities. Quebec was the first to act, with military personnel arriving on April 17. Ontario responded next, with Premier Doug Ford requesting military aid on April 22.

==== Travel and entry restrictions ====
On March 14, Canada recommended against any international travel and advised those returning from outside of Canada, except for essential workers (such as flight crew), to self-isolate for 14 days. The Quarantine Act was invoked by Hajdu on March 26, making self-isolation a legal mandate for travelers (excluding essential workers) returning to the country. It also prohibits those who are symptomatic from using public transit as transport to their place of self-isolation, and prohibiting self-isolation in settings where they may come in contact with those who are vulnerable (people with pre-existing conditions and the elderly).

Starting March 16, only Canadian citizens and their immediate families, permanent residents, and U.S. citizens were allowed to enter the country. The only exceptions were flight crews, diplomats, and trade and commerce. Travellers showing COVID-19 symptoms were not allowed to board flights into Canada, regardless of their citizenship. International flights to Canada from outside the Caribbean, Mexico, and the U.S. were instructed to land at either Calgary International Airport, Montréal–Trudeau International Airport, Toronto Pearson International Airport, or Vancouver International Airport.

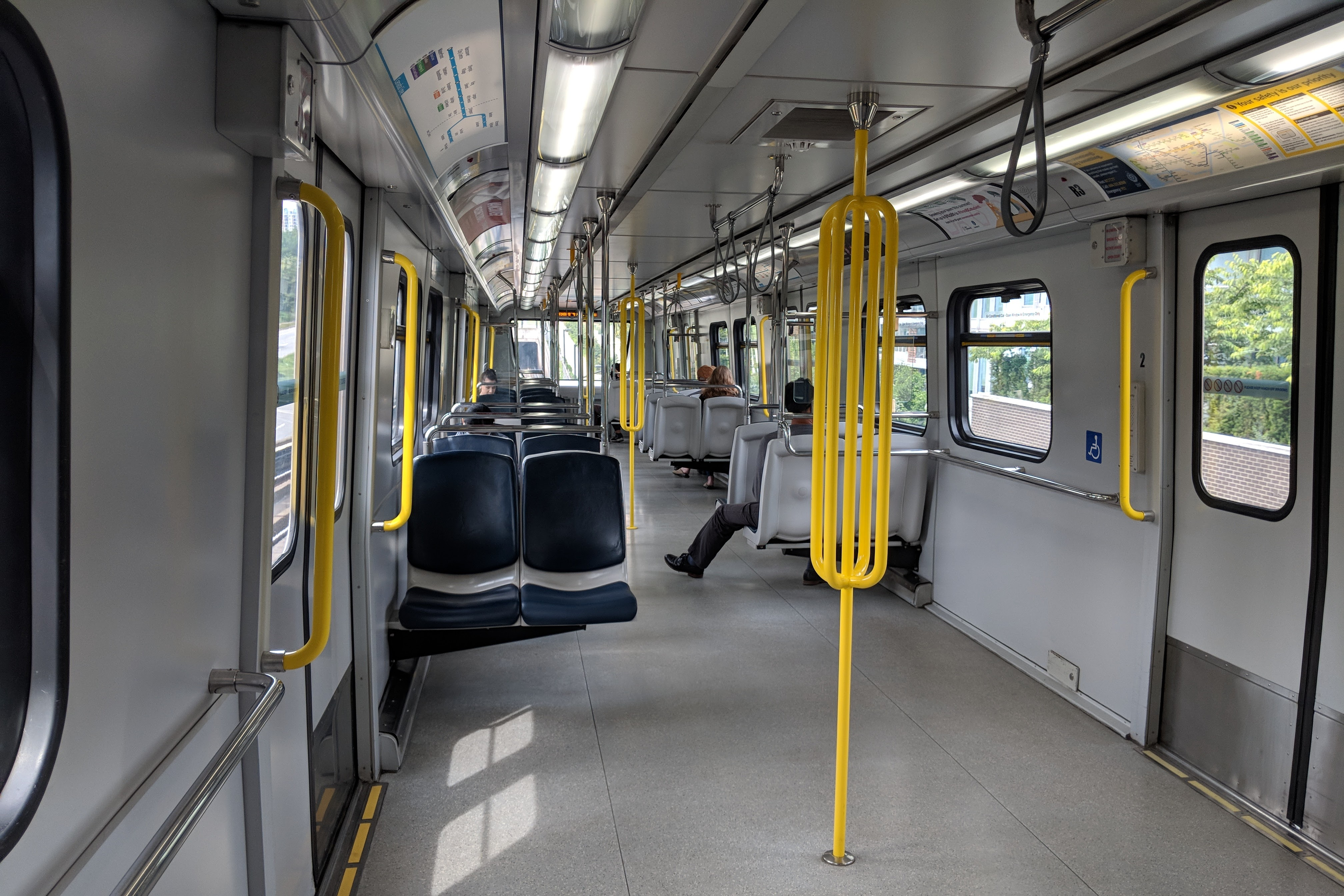
An almost empty SkyTrain in Vancouver on a Saturday afternoon

From March 20, Canada and the United States temporarily restricted all non-essential travel across their land border. The U.S. did not restrict non-essential air travel into the country by Canadians, but Americans were prohibited from boarding flights into Canada per U.S. restrictions—a non-reciprocal restriction that was criticized as being contradictory. On April 16, Trudeau stated that the Canada/U.S. border restrictions would remain in place "for a significant amount of time". The next day, Canada and the United States agreed to extend their entry restrictions, which were to expire on April 21, for an additional 30 days beyond that date.

On April 20, the federal government introduced the "ArriveCAN" mobile app, which is used to conduct entry screenings and submit documentation; use of the app became mandatory in November.

Since March 30, individuals showing COVID-19 symptoms were to be refused boarding on domestic flights (10 seats or more) and passenger trains. However, it excluded buses and intercity passenger rail services. From April 20, all travellers were required to wear face masks while departing and arriving on air travel, including during security screenings. Those who did not comply were prevented from proceeding.

As the land border with the United States continued to be closed to non-essential travel, the Canadian government announced plans in October to allow family members to reunite under compassionate terms. Within the country, the Canadian provinces of New Brunswick, Prince Edward Island, Nova Scotia and Newfoundland and Labrador established the Atlantic Bubble, restricting travel from other provinces but allowing free movement amongst residents of the member provinces.

On January 6, 2021, the federal government announced that all incoming travellers must present proof of a negative COVID-19 PCR test conducted within 72 hours of their departure time to board flights into Canada.

On January 29, 2021, due to concerns surrounding SARS-CoV-2 variants, Trudeau announced a series of new travel restrictions. Travellers arriving in Canada would be required to receive a COVID-19 PCR test on arrival and must quarantine at an "approved hotel" at their own expense. At the same time, they awaited test results or recovery and were subject to "increased surveillance" during the remainder of the mandatory 14-day quarantine period. Foreign flights were only allowed to land in Calgary, Montreal, Toronto, or Vancouver. To discourage non-essential travel, the major airlines agreed to suspend all flights to the Caribbean and Mexico until April 30, 2021. On February 12, it was announced a third PCR test would also be required at the end of the 14-day quarantine period. The new rules for international travel went into effect on February 22.

In July 2021, the government lifted the quarantine requirement for Canadian citizens and permanent residents re-entering the country, provided they submit proof of vaccination via the ArriveCAN app or website. On August 9, 2021, Canada reopened its land border to American citizens and permanent residents that are fully-vaccinated. However, the U.S. land border remained closed to Canadians entering the United States until November 8, 2021, when the U.S. began to allow non-essential land travel into the country, with a vaccine mandate for residents 18 and over (enforced via random checks). However, as with air travel, anyone re-entering the country was required to present proof of a negative COVID-19 PCR test conducted within 72 hours of their arrival; this test could alternatively be obtained in Canada if the traveler had been in the country for less than 72 hours.

On October 6, 2021, it was announced that all passengers of federally-regulated transportation over the age of 12 (including air travel, cruises, and Via Rail or Rocky Mountaineer trains) would be required to be fully-vaccinated beginning October 30, 2021. Until November 30, 2021, a recent negative test was also accepted.

Beginning January 15, 2022, international truckers entering the country were required to be fully-vaccinated; this decision instigated a protest convoy—backed largely by supporters of alt-right and far-right movements—which culminated in a multi-day occupation of downtown Ottawa, and evolved into a general protest against all COVID-19 vaccine mandates.

Beginning April 1, 2022, pre-entry PCR testing requirements were dropped for fully-vaccinated travelers entering the country. However, air travelers were still subject to random testing as part of surveillance for variants (which would not require self-isolation).

On September 26, 2022, it was announced that all remaining COVID-19-related travel restrictions and mandates would be dropped effective October 1, 2022; this includes vaccine requirements, masking requirements, random tests, and the requirement to submit documentation via ArriveCAN. However, on December 31, 2022, the government announced that mandatory testing would be reinstated for travellers entering from China beginning January 5, 2023.

==== Governmental cancellations ====
A First Ministers' meeting scheduled for March 12 and 13 was cancelled after Trudeau and his wife Sophie Grégoire entered self-isolation. The Canadian House of Commons was suspended between March 14 and April 20, immediately after passing the new North American free trade deal. The federal budget, previously scheduled for March 20, was also suspended.

==== Bank of Canada rate changes ====
In March 2020, the Bank of Canada twice lowered its overnight rate target by 50 basis points—first to 1.25 percent on March 4, and then to 0.75 percent on March 13. It cited the "negative shocks to Canada's economy arising from the COVID-19 pandemic and the recent sharp drop in oil prices" in explaining the move.

On March 27, the Bank lowered the rate a third time to 0.25 percent, citing "serious consequences for Canadians and for the economy" due to the COVID-19 pandemic. The Bank also launched a program to "alleviate strains in the short-term funding markets" and another program to acquire Government of Canada securities at a minimum of $5 billion per week.

==== Federal aid ====
On March 18, the federal government announced an $82-billion response package with a variety of measures. On March 25, the COVID-19 Emergency Response Act received royal assent from Governor General Julie Payette.

The measures in this first package included:

- Canada Child Benefit (CCB): Payments for the 2019–20-year were increased by $300 per child.
- Goods and Services Tax (GST) credit: The maximum annual GST credit payment amount for the 2019–20 year was doubled.
- Canada Emergency Response Benefit (CERB): This new benefit provided a taxable benefit of $2,000 a month for up to four months for those who had lost their job, were sick, quarantined, or taking care of someone sick with COVID-19, as well as working parents staying home to take care of their kids.
- Canada Student Loans: A six-month moratorium was placed on repayment.
- Temporary business wage subsidy: Eligible small employers received a three-month 10 percent wage subsidy.
- Tax flexibility: The income tax filing deadline was also extended from April 30, 2020, to June 1, 2020. Tax payments were deferred to September 2020.

The CERB launched on April 6. On April 15, Trudeau announced an extension to the CERB to workers making up to $1,000 per month and that the government planned to work with the provinces to implement salary top-ups for essential workers who make less than $2,500 per month.

The Canada Emergency Wage Subsidy (CEWS) was announced on April 1, an expanded version of the temporary business wage subsidy. The Parliament reconvened on April 11 to pass the COVID-19 Emergency Response Act, No. 2 on division. It implemented the CEWS, allowing eligible companies to receive a 75 percent subsidy on each of their employees' wages (up to their first $58,700) for 12 weeks retroactive to March 15.

Trudeau introduced new financial aid programs on April 10, including the Canada Emergency Business Account (CEBA), which offers loans, interest-free until the end of 2022, of up to $40,000 for small- and medium-sized businesses. The CEBA was expanded on April 16 to make more businesses eligible by expanding the payroll window for eligibility from $50,000–1,000,000 to $20,000–1,500,000.

Trudeau announced the Canada Emergency Student Benefit (CESB) on April 22.

On April 30, Parliamentary Budget Officer Yves Giroux issued a report projecting the federal deficit for the fiscal year 2020 could be in excess of $252 billion, based on nearly $146 billion in spending on federal aid measures.

On October 12, 2020, the federal government rolled out a new income support program after the ending of CERB, the Canada Recovery Benefit (CRB). Another program, the Canada Recovery Caregiving Benefit (CRCB), supports Canadians working but have to take a break to care for dependents (a child below 12 years of age or a disabled family member). The benefit only applies if schools and care centres are closed or the dependent fell sick or contracted COVID-19.

==== Industrial strategy ====
On March 20, 2020, the government announced a plan to ramp up production of medical equipment, switching assembly lines to produce ventilators, masks, and other personal protective gear. Companies will be able to access funds through the government's Strategic Innovation Fund. The PM stated that Canadian medical supply firms Thornhill Medical, Medicom and Spartan Bioscience were looking to expand production. The government also contracted Sterling Industries, a medical device manufacturer, to facilitate the production of over 15 million medical face shields (PPE) in response to the COVID-19 pandemic. To address shortages and supply-chain disruption, Canada passed emergency legislation that waived patent protection, giving the government, companies or organizations that it selects the right to produce patented products without permission from the patent holder. According to Innovation, Science and Industry minister Navdeep Bains, "the country's entire industrial policy will be refocused to prioritize the fight against COVID-19".

==== Virtual care ====
During the COVID-19 pandemic, 34% of people consulted their doctors over the phone. In May 2020, Justin Trudeau announced an investment of $240.5 million to support the growth of virtual care and mental health tools in Canada.

=== States of emergency ===
Restrictions imposed by provincial and territorial governments
Province or territory	State of Emergency (Note: The start date refers to the first declaration of a state of emergency, while the end date refers to the final expiry date for all declarations.)		Gatherings banned	Border status (Note: Refers to status of internal borders only. Although the Canadian Charter of Rights and Freedoms guarantees broad mobility rights to Canadian citizens, during a state of emergency provincial and territorial governments can effectively restrict or deny entry due to primarily their lawful authority to, at their discretion, refuse any person permission to use their roads: Open: No restrictions on entry from other Canadian provinces and territories. Screened: Health checks and/or self-isolation mandatory for persons entering from other Canadian provinces and territories. Restricted: Entry prohibited for non-residents without a valid reason to enter the province or territory. Regional: Entry restricted to (a) specific region(s) of the province or territory.)	Mask mandate (Note: Face masks are compulsory for ages 2 and up, except in British Columbia (ages 12 and up for both mandates), Québec (ages 10 and up as of August 24, 2020; previously ages 12 and up), and Newfoundland and Labrador (ages 5 and up). British Columbia and Manitoba implemented mask mandates for two periods. The first provincial mask mandate was effective from December 13, 2020, to June 30, 2021, in Alberta, from November 19, 2020, to June 30, 2021, in British Columbia, and from November 2, 2020, to August 6, 2021, in Manitoba. For all ages, limited medical exemptions may apply. Some cities implemented local mandates earlier: July 7, 2020: Toronto and Ottawa (in Ontario) July 31, 2020: Banff (in Alberta) August 1, 2020: Calgary and Edmonton (in Alberta) September 25, 2020: Winnipeg (in Manitoba))		Vaccine passport	Sources
Province or territory	Start date	End date	Gatherings banned	Border status	Start date	End date	Vaccine passport	Sources
Alberta	March 17, 2020	December 14, 2021	No restrictions	Open	September 4, 2021	March 1, 2022 (Note: The mask mandate ended on July 1, 2021 in Alberta, and was reinstated September 4, 2021, it was ended again on March 1, 2022.)	Terminated	
British Columbia	March 18, 2020	June 30, 2021	No restrictions	Open	August 25, 2021	March 11, 2022 (Note: The mask mandate ended on July 1, 2021 in British Columbia, and was reinstated August 25, 2021. It was ended again on March 11, 2022.)	Terminated	
Manitoba	March 20, 2020	October 21, 2021	No restrictions	Open	August 28, 2021	March 15, 2022	Terminated	
New Brunswick	March 19, 2020	March 14, 2022	No restrictions	Open	September 22, 2021	March 14, 2022	Terminated	
Newfoundland and Labrador	March 18, 2020	March 14, 2022	No restrictions	Open	September 18, 2021	March 14, 2022	Terminated	
Northwest Territories	March 18, 2020	March 1, 2022	No restrictions	Open	August 25, 2021	April 1, 2022	Terminated	
Nova Scotia	March 22, 2020	March 21, 2022	No restrictions	Open	July 31, 2020	March 21, 2022	Terminated	
Nunavut	March 18, 2020	April 11, 2022	No restrictions	Open	September 19, 2021	March 9, 2022	No	
Ontario	March 17, 2020	February 23, 2022	No restrictions	Open (Note: From April 19 to June 16, 2021, entry into the province via land borders was prohibited for non-essential travel.)	October 3, 2020	March 21, 2022	Terminated (Note: Terminated as of March 1, 2022.)	(Note: On July 16, 2021, Ontario entered Step 3 of reopening. Almost all businesses can reopen, with limited restrictions. Ontario implemented its first SAHO on March 24, 2020. To date, a total of three SAHOs were imposed, with province-wide SAHOs and lockdowns totalling 165 days. Most activities in Ontario were closed for even longer.) (Note: Effective July 27, daycares can open if they have 15 people (staff and children) per group.) (Note: Stage 3 is effective July 17 in most regions, July 24 in a few other regions, July 31 in Peel and Toronto, and August 12 in Windsor-Essex.) (Note: Dancing is prohibited but if the dancers are hired by the bar they are allowed to dance.)
Prince Edward Island	March 16, 2020	April 6, 2022	No restrictions	Open	September 17, 2021	May 6, 2022	Terminated	
Quebec	March 12, 2020	June 1, 2022	No restrictions	Open	July 18, 2020	May 14, 2022	Terminated	(Note: Summary of reopening for Quebec: April 1, 2021: Dark Red zones, with special emergency measures, are introduced in several regions: most of Capitale-Nationale, most of Outaouais, and the city of Lévis, Quebec. May 24, 2021: All of Quebec is at Red zone or better. June 28, 2021: All of Quebec is at Green zone. Québec implemented a curfew from January 9 to May 27, 2021, for Dark Red, Red and Orange zones.)
Saskatchewan	March 18, 2020	March 14, 2022	No restrictions	Open	September 17, 2021	March 1, 2022 (Note: The mask mandate ended on July 11, 2021 in Saskatchewan, and was reinstated September 17, 2021, it was later repealed on March 1, 2022.)	Terminated	
Yukon	March 18, 2020	March 17, 2022	No restrictions	Open	December 1, 2020	March 18, 2022	Terminated	

On March 12, Quebec declared a public health emergency, requiring international travellers to self-isolate for 14 days and banning gatherings of 250 people. Extending the ban to all gatherings outside workplaces and retail.

On March 16, Prince Edward Island declared a public health emergency. Alberta and Ontario declared emergencies on March 17, followed by British Columbia, Newfoundland and Labrador, the Northwest Territories, Nunavut, Saskatchewan, and Yukon on March 18. New Brunswick, Manitoba, and Nova Scotia declared emergencies on March 19, March 20, and March 22 respectively.

These emergencies allowed provinces to ban gatherings and require international travellers to self-isolate. On March 25, mandatory self-isolation was imposed federally, making it a legal requirement for all provinces that had not done so already.

New Brunswick, the Northwest Territories, Nunavut, Prince Edward Island and have all restricted entry through interprovincial borders, prohibiting the entry of non-residents without a valid reason. Quebec has additionally restricted travel into 9 of its 18 regions and parts of 3 other regions. The borders of Nova Scotia and Newfoundland and Labrador are being screened, while also requiring travellers to self-isolate for 14 days upon entering the province.

==== Schools and universities ====
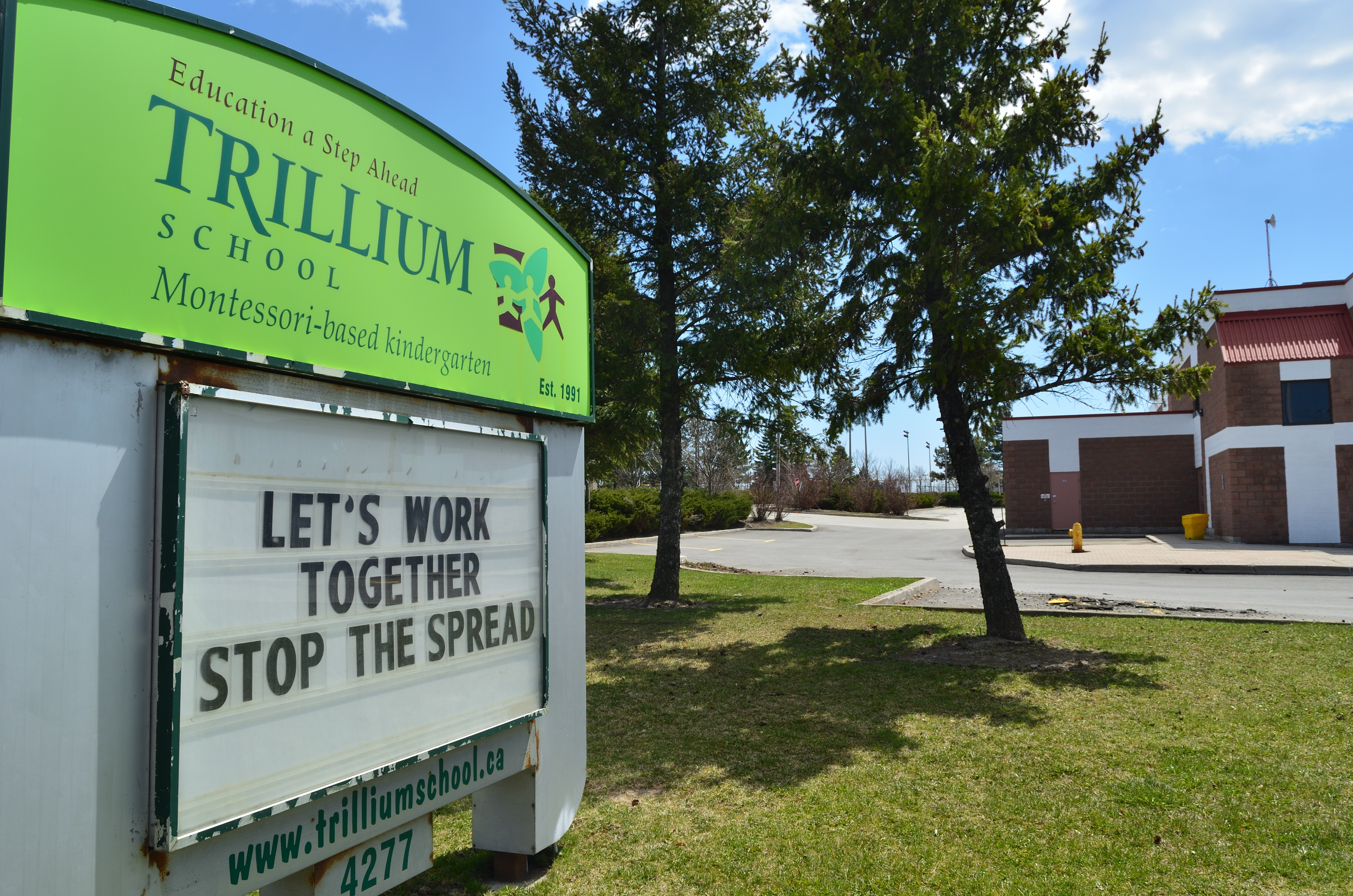
Let's Work Together Stop the Spread sign at a school in the GTA.

Public schools (under Provincial control) across the country quickly followed suit and closed.

Schools in the Toronto District School Board were closed under a 2-week class-free quarantine beginning on the week after the regularly scheduled March Break. Virtual learning was implemented in the week following the quarantine and extended until the beginning of the next school year, giving students the option of going in-person with restrictions or continuing virtual learning. March Break was pushed back to the week of April 11.

Laurentian University in Greater Sudbury was the first to voluntarily suspended classes and moved to online instruction on March 12. This was quickly followed by many other universities across the country.

==== Business closures ====
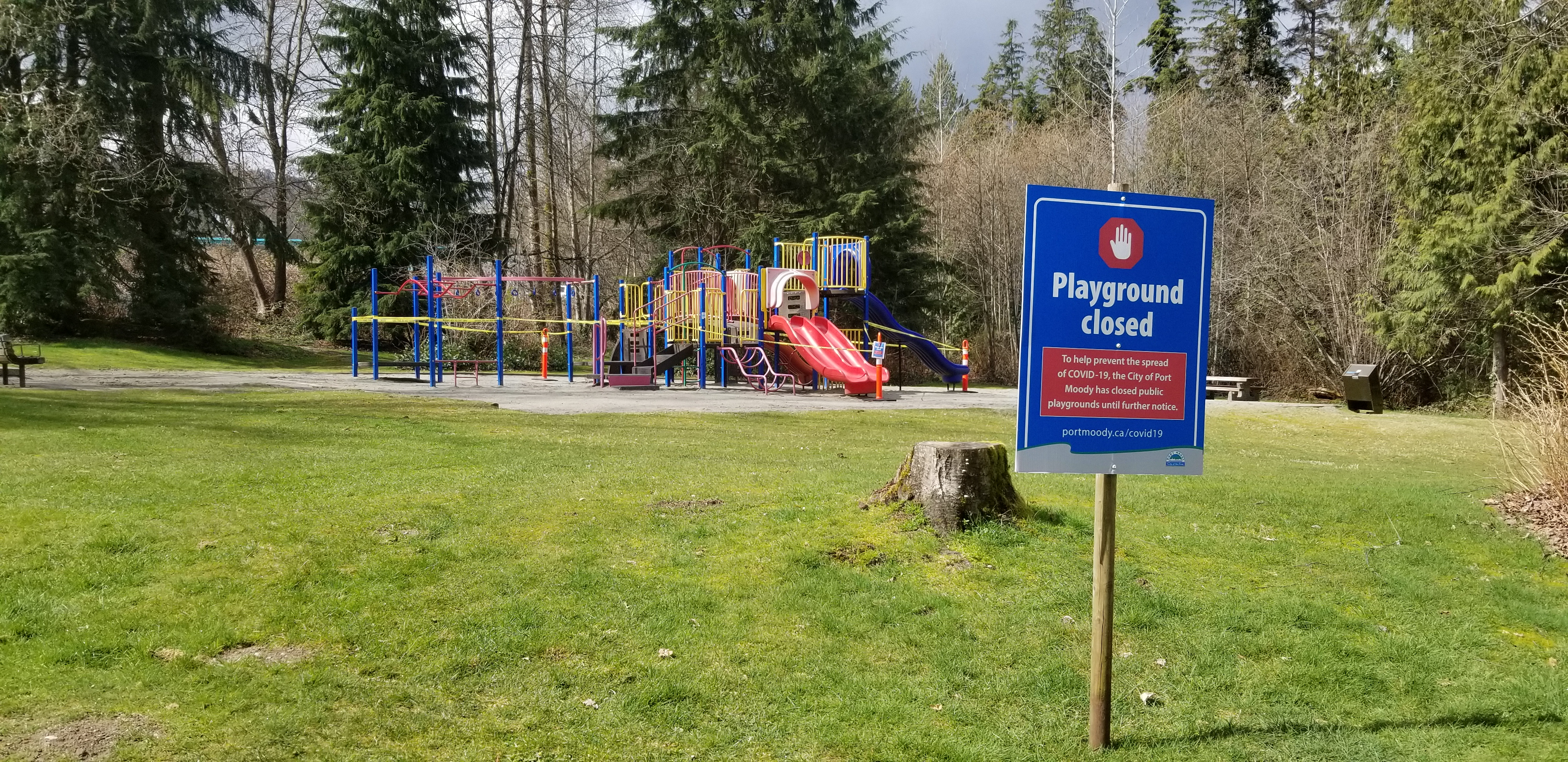
Playground in Port Moody, British Columbia, closed off with caution tape. A sign indicates the playground is closed because of COVID-19.

Bars, restaurants, cinemas, and other businesses were ordered closed by provinces, territories, and municipalities across the country. Initially, some jurisdictions allowed restaurants or bars to stay open with reduced capacity and social distancing. Takeout and delivery orders were largely still permitted. Jurisdictions differed on daycare closures. In particular, British Columbia and Saskatchewan faced criticism for allowing daycares to remain open while closing schools, bars, and restaurants.

Ontario, Quebec, and Saskatchewan mandated the closure of all businesses not deemed essential by the provinces. Essential businesses included grocery stores, takeout and delivery restaurants, pharmacies, transportation, manufacturing, food production, energy, and healthcare.

Liquor and cannabis stores mostly remained open across the country, with governments reversing their closure orders due to alcohol withdrawal syndrome concerns.

==== Aid programs ====
Alberta, British Columbia, New Brunswick, Prince Edward Island, and Manitoba all offered one-time payments that aimed to bridge the gap before implementing the federal Canada Emergency Response Benefit. Quebec's Temporary Aid for Workers Program provided up to four weeks of payments for those who do not qualify for federal assistance. Prince Edward Island also provided payments to those who kept their jobs but worked reduced hours. Many provinces and territories increased payments for those already receiving income supports.

=== Courts ===
Courts across the country instituted measures to reduce public contact while maintaining access to the courts. The Supreme Court of Canada building was closed to public tours while maintaining the ability to file documents for cases electronically. It also adjourned appeals which were to be heard in March, to dates in June. Other courts prioritized the cases that would be heard, giving priority to ongoing criminal trials and trials in family and child protection matters while adjourning most pending cases to later dates.

=== First Nations ===
On March 19, the Pimicikamak Cree Nation in northern Manitoba restricted entry to essential travellers, and Chief David Monias said the Sayisi Dene and others are doing the same.

As of March 19, the Council of the Haida Nation said it was discouraging all non-resident travel to the islands "for the time being."

On March 27, Wasauksing First Nation declared a state of emergency with Gimaa (chief) Wally Tabobondung announcing the creation of a response team and the state of emergency via YouTube video. In an update posted on May 16, the chief and council announced they had installed cameras with facial and licence plate recognition technology at local checkpoints to identify outsiders entering the territory. Cottagers leasing property on the territory had been barred from entering until June 6. As of June 6, anyone entering the Wasauksing must have a tag issued by the band government and provide information for a centralized registry. Re-opening occurred in phases. As of an update posted on June 21, the state of emergency had been extended an additional 90 days.

On October 1, in anticipation of the "Second Wave," Tk’emlups te Secwepemc Secwépemc First Nation instituted a mandatory face mask policy in indoor spaces where physical distancing was not possible, including hallways, staircases, and shared vehicles.

As of October 8, the infection rate in Indigenous communities had been one-third of the infection rate in non-Indigenous communities, according to an update from Indigenous Services Minister Marc Miller. Miller praised Indigenous leadership and with Indigenous Services Canada's Chief Medical Officer Dr. Tim Wong, encouraging Indigenous people to remain vigilant and safe.

First Nations communities were prioritized amongst others in the first phase of vaccinations against the virus.

== Economic impact ==
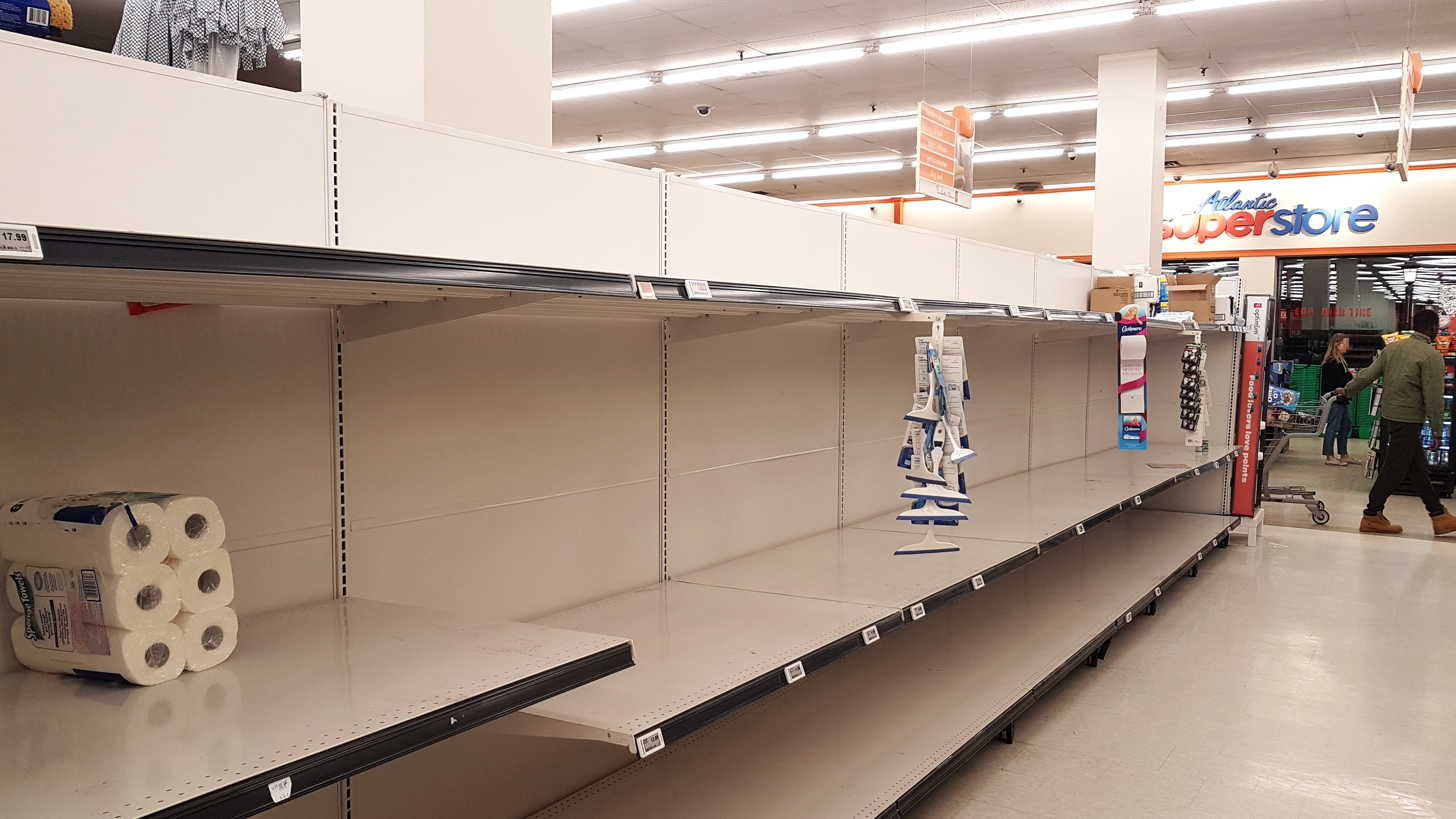
Panic buying: empty toilet paper shelves on 12 March 2020 at an Atlantic Superstore in Halifax, Nova Scotia.

The COVID-19 pandemic had a deep impact on the Canadian economy, leading it into a recession. The government's social distancing rules limited economic activity in the country. Companies started mass layoffs of workers, and Canada's unemployment rate was 13.5 percent in May 2020, the highest since 1976. In June 2021, a report revealed that Canada spent C$624.2 billion (US$517 billion) on pandemic-related measures.

Many large-scale events that planned to take place in 2020 in Canada were cancelled or delayed. This includes all major sporting and artistic events. Canada's tourism and air travel sectors were hit especially hard due to travel restrictions. Some farmers feared a labour shortfall and bankruptcy.

The pandemic affected consumer behaviours. In the early stages of the pandemic, Canadian grocery stores were the site of large-scale panic buying which led to many empty shelves. By the end of March 2020, most stores were closed to walk-in customers with the exception of grocery stores and pharmacies, which implemented strong social distancing rules in their premises. These rules were also implemented in other Canadian businesses as they began to re-open in the following months.

== Pandemic by province or territory ==
- Alberta
- British Columbia

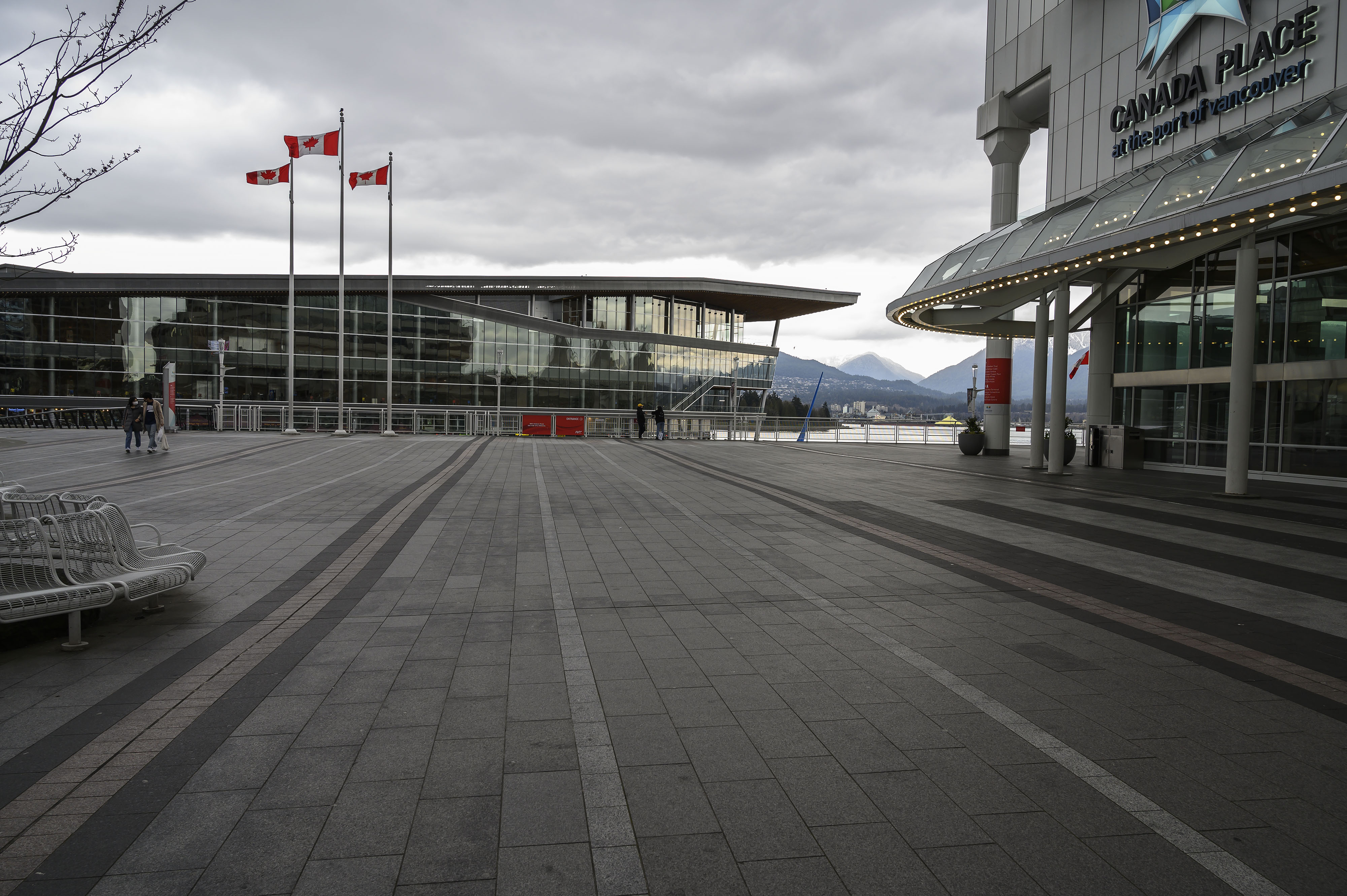
Deserted exterior of Canada Place in Vancouver.

- Manitoba
- New Brunswick
- Newfoundland and Labrador
- Northwest Territories
- Nova Scotia
- Nunavut
- Ontario

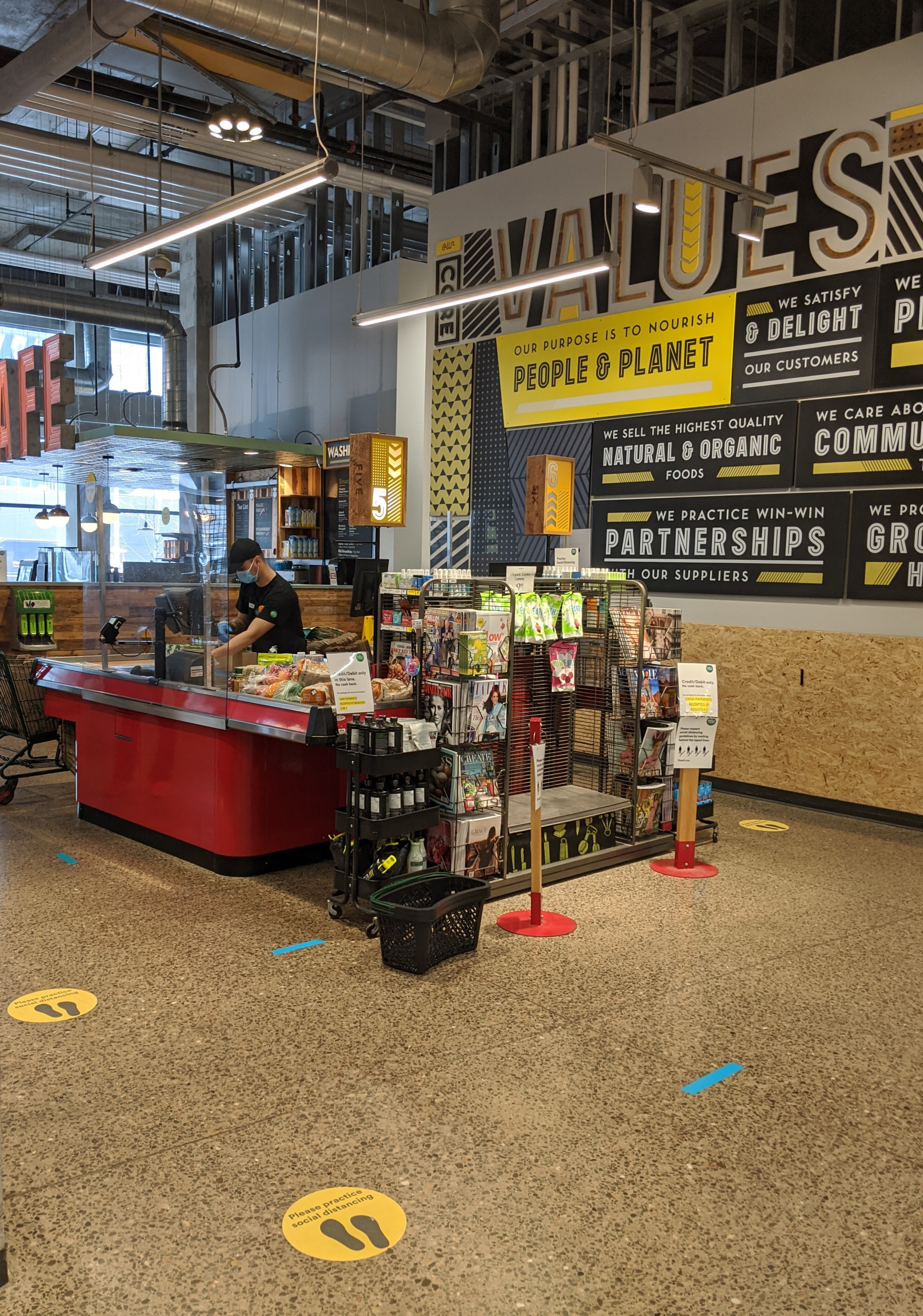
Social distancing markers at Whole Foods Market in Toronto.

- Prince Edward Island
- Quebec
- Saskatchewan
- Yukon

== COVID-19 testing ==
COVID-19 testing can be used to track the prevalence and spread, to diagnose individuals for treatment, to identify infections for isolation and contact tracing, to screen at-risk populations, to clear exposed healthcare workers to return to work, and to identify individuals with potential immunity. The World Health Organization says that jurisdictions should aim to test every suspected case of COVID-19. Since health care is under provincial jurisdiction, almost all testing is conducted by the provinces and territories rather than the federal government. On April 23, Trudeau identified broader testing as key to reopening the country, mentioning the target of 60,000 tests per day set by Dr. Theresa Tam, but warned that up to 120,000 per day may be required. As of late April, approximately 20,000 tests per day were being performed in Canada. Total numbers of tests conducted for the provinces and Canada show that over 800,000 Canadians have been tested as of early May 2020. The displayed chart shows the testing rates per capita in the provinces and territories from March to May 2020.

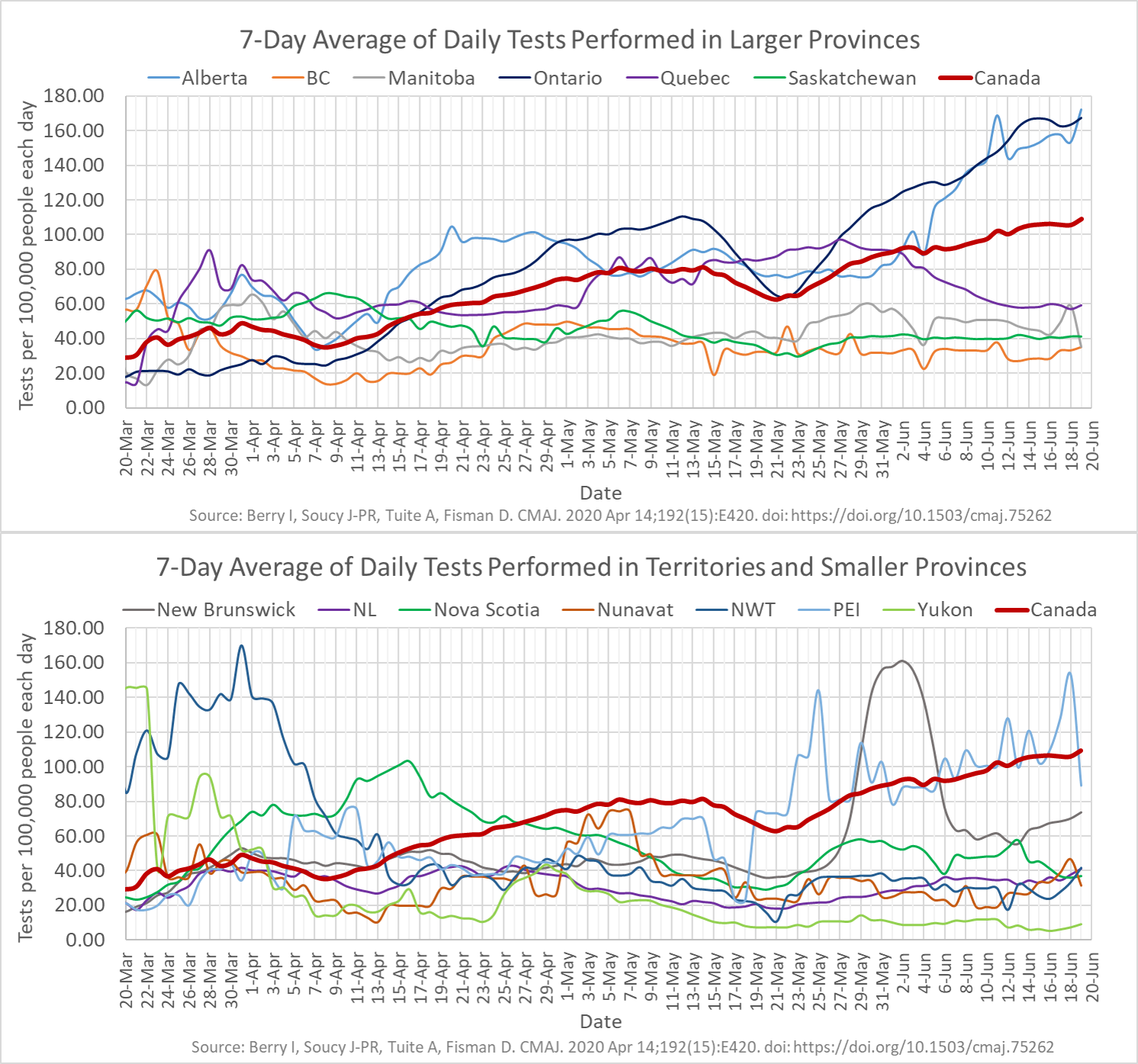
The COVID-19 testing rates in the provinces and territories of Canada from March to June 2020. The lines are a 7-day moving average. Sources: and Statistics Canada. Table 17-10-0009-01 Population estimates, quarterly

=== Role of the Government of Canada ===
==== Federal approval and regulation of diagnostic tests ====
Only COVID-19 tests approved by Health Canada can be imported or sold in Canada. Since this is usually a lengthy process, on March 18, the Minister of Health Hajdu issued an interim order to allow expedited access to COVID-19-related medical devices for use by healthcare providers, including diagnostic test kits. The same day, the first commercial tests were approved, RT-PCR tests from Roche and Thermo Fisher. Another 13 diagnostic products have since been approved, all based on Nucleic Acid tests. As of April 30, 21 diagnostic device applications were listed as submitted by Health Canada.

==== National Microbiology Lab ====
Canada's National Microbiology Lab in Winnipeg performs diagnostic testing for and research into COVID-19. Samples from suspected cases early in the pandemic were sent by provinces and territories to this national lab for testing, either as the sole test or as a check of an in-province test result. The lab diagnosed the first confirmed case in Canada on January 27, 2020. Since then, provinces and territories have established their own testing capacity but have occasionally sent samples to the national lab for a second test as a check.

==== Federal facilitation of testing ====
Provinces faced COVID-19 testing backlogs due to a shortage of supplies, including the chemical reagents required to complete the tests. In late April, the federal government arranged for a cargo flight from China that delivered the equivalent of about six to nine months of production for one particular raw material for the 20-odd raw materials needed by supplier LuminUltra to supply reagent kits for RT-PCR machines.

=== Types of COVID-19 tests ===
==== Virus-RNA tests ====
Health Canada identified nucleic acid-based testing as "the gold standard used in Canada and abroad, for the diagnosis of active COVID-19 infection in patients with symptoms." The predominant type of testing is used in RT-PCR. They use a carefully produced and validated swab to collect a sample from a person's throat, back of the nose, or front of the nose. The swab is put inside a sealed container containing a medium that preserves the virus, which is sent to test-processing centres in the corresponding province or territory. At the centres, highly skilled technicians use large commercial machines from a variety of manufactures to process tens to hundreds batches of samples at a time. The test chemically strips the RNA from the sample then mixes it with a test kit containing chemical reagents designed to detect RNA signatures of SARS-CoV-2. The sample is cycled between a set of temperatures to amplify the chemical RNA signature. This leads to processing times that range from 4 to 24 hours. The actual RT-PCR test is 99 percent accurate. However, false-negative results are estimated to occur 8 to 10 percent of the time due to poor swabbing technique. They may be as high as 30 percent, depending on how long after symptom onset the test was performed.

===== Virus-RNA test reagent kits =====
LuminUltra Technologies Ltd. of Fredericton produced reagent test kits to use with automated RT-PCR machines. On April 15, Trudeau announced that the company would be "ramping up production ... to meet the weekly demand in all provinces." The company announced the same day that it would provide "500,000 urgently needed COVID-19 tests per week to the Canadian federal government for use across Canada."

===== Canadian-made viral RNA test systems =====
Spartan Bioscience of Ottawa signed contracts with the federal government and the provinces of Alberta, Quebec, and Ontario to supply virus-RNA testing systems that process a single swab sample in 30 to 60 minutes. Together the contracts were for over one million swab test kits, and at least 250 handheld devices. On April 13, Health Canada approved this test, but on May 3 the test was recalled due to unreliable results.

Precision Biomonitoring of Guelph signed a Letter of Intent on March 31 with the federal government to co-develop a novel point-of-care test kit for COVID-19, which is now pending an authorization from Health Canada. Their 1.2 kg battery-operated mobile device performs nine tests per hour and takes 60 minutes to produce a result.

Bio-ID Diagnostics of Edmonton developed a direct 24-hour virus test that could be scaled to 20,000 samples per day. Since it is based on sequencing DNA it avoids false positives, and it detects a low concentration of the virus, substantially reducing false negatives in asymptomatic individuals.

On October 5, Health Canada approved a portable PCR test – the Hyris bCUBE —which was based on technology developed at the University of Guelph and can process tests in 90 minutes.

==== Serological testing for antibodies ====
These blood tests look for antibodies to the SARS-CoV-2 virus and range in complexity from laboratory tests to at-home kits similar to pregnancy tests. Antibodies do not form immediately upon infection, so these tests are not well-suited for detecting a current infection. However, they can potentially identify those who have been infected in the past. Health Canada has been evaluating several antibody tests. Health Canada deemed that "Serological tests are not appropriate for early diagnosis of COVID-19, largely due variability in the time required after infection to develop antibodies." On May 12, 2020, Health Canada announced the first antibody test approved for use, a laboratory test from DiaSorin, an Italian multinational biotechnology company. Health Canada wrote that the trial would "contribute to a better understanding of whether people who have been infected are immune to the virus."

===== Research and population immunity =====
Health Canada posts "studies will be required to determine how long the antibodies remain detectable, whether for weeks, months or years" and "the relationship between antibodies and immunity to future viral infection." Nonetheless, many countries are conducting or planning large-scale testing to determine the population's proportion that are potentially immune. As of April 20, the WHO estimated that the most affected countries had at most 2 to 3 percent of people infected. On April 23, 2020, Trudeau created a COVID-19 Immunity Task Force of researchers, including Dr. Tam, Dr. David Naylor, and Dr. Mona Nemer, to coordinate monitoring of immunity and vulnerability to COVID-19 in the Canadian population. The taskforce will oversee national antibody surveys over the next two years in which will test one million Canadians. Researchers at Sinai Health's Lunenfeld-Tanenbaum Research Institute in Toronto are developing a robotic system that can process mass numbers of antibody tests.

===== Canadian-made antibody tests =====
MedMira of Halifax developed one of the first rapid detection kits for HIV and has now developed a COVID-19 antibody test that takes three minutes from taking the blood drop specimen.

Plantform Corp. of Guelph applied for funding from the National Research Council to develop an antibody test for COVID-19.

==== Rapid antigen testing ====
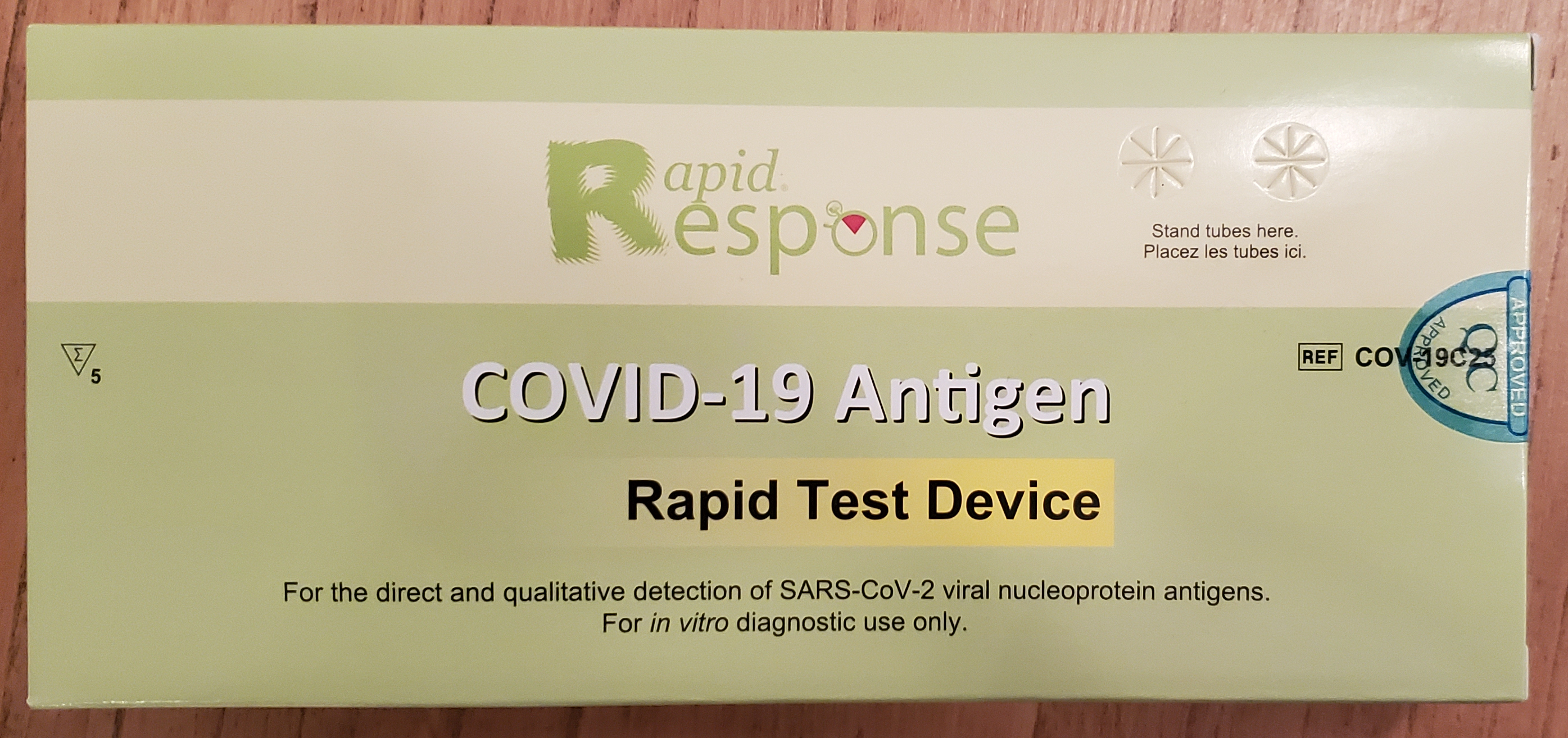
The rapid antigen test kit that was procured by the Canadian government and distributed to Canadians for free

Tests for antigens, proteins that are part of the virus's surface, were first approved by Health Canada on October 6, when it approved and ordered 20.5 million units of one manufactured by Abbott Laboratories as a point-of-care test. They can produce results faster than PCR tests (around 20 minutes) but are generally less accurate than PCR tests. Abbott states that they are designed for preliminary results and not intended "as the sole basis for treatment or other management decisions." Deputy Chief Public Health Officer Howard Njoo stated these tests could be deployed in workplaces and communal living environments.

===== Canadian-made rapid antigen tests =====
Sona Nanotech of Halifax was developing point-of-care COVID-19 antigen test kits that provide results in 5–15 minutes with an anticipating cost to be less than $50. If successful, the project will yield 20,000 test kits available per week, with the potential to scale up to 1 million test kits per week.

== Statistics ==
As of 15 April 2023, total COVID-19 death statistics by Canadian province were: Ontario: 15,786; Quebec: 18,164; British Columbia: 5,007; Alberta: 5,584; Manitoba: 2,319; Saskatchewan: 1,880; Nova Scotia: 773; New Brunswick: 762; Newfoundland and Labrador: 316; Prince Edward Island: 90; Northwest Territories: 22; Yukon: 31; and Nunavut: 7. In Canada, the total number of COVID-19 deaths as of this date was approximately 51,921.

=== National maps ===
Total cases per 100,000 inhabitants by province/territory

Total deaths per 100,000 inhabitants by province/territory

=== By age ===
Confirmed COVID-19 cases in Canada by age
Classification		Cases		Hospitalizations		ICU		Deaths		Lethality	
Classification		Number	%	Number	%	Number	%	Number	%	%	1 person in
All		4,222,297	100.00	193,686	100.0	29,844	100.00	46,029	100.00	1.090	91,7
Age	≥80	278,723	6.60	57,001	29.43	3,522	11.80	27,939	60.70	10.024	10.0
Age	70–79	213,126	5.05	39,557	20.42	6,948	23.28	9,875	21.46	4.633	21.6
Age	60–69	335,533	7.95	31,466	16.25	7,567	25.36	4,889	10.62	1.457	68.6
Age	50–59	525,706	12.45	22,161	11.44	5,434	18.21	2,061	4.48	0.392	255.1
Age	40–49	670,066	15.87	14,094	7.28	2,914	9.76	720	1.56	0.107	930.6
Age	30–39	711,908	16.86	12,999	6.71	1,774	5.94	335	0.73	0.047	2,125.1
Age	20–29	744,245	17.63	8,634	4.46	933	3.13	144	0.31	0.019	5,168.3
Age	12-19	329,592	7.80	2,350	1.21	244	0.82	25	0.05	0.008	13,183.7
Age	0–11	413,408	9.79	5,424	2.80	508	1.70	41	0.09	0.010	10,083.1
Source: Public Health Agency of Canada; Note: The PHAC's stopped providing updates on this data (age, hospitalizations, ICUs) on November 23, 2022. The number of confirmed cases provided in this table (4,222,297 as of November 23 was< 4.38% lower than in the other official count (4,411,430 cases as of November 23). The number of deaths in this table (46,029 of November 23) was 4.13% lower than in the other official count (47,971 deaths as of November 23). These serious discrepancies in official reports were never addressed by the PHAC or any other relevant authorities.

=== Deaths ===
Deaths by age groups - Summary (as of November 23, 2022)
All	46,029	100.00%
50+	44,764	97.25%
30-49	1,055	2.29%
0-29	210	0.46%

Deaths by age groups - Detailed (as of November 23, 2022)
80+	60.70%	82.15%	92.77%	97.25%	98.82%	99.54%	99.86%	100.00%
70-79		82.15%	92.77%	97.25%	98.82%	99.54%	99.86%	100.00%
60-69			92.77%	97.25%	98.82%	99.54%	99.86%	100.00%
50-59				97.25%	98.82%	99.54%	99.86%	100.00%
40-49					98.82%	99.54%	99.86%	100.00%
30-39						99.54%	99.86%	100.00%
20-29							99.86%	100.00%
0-19								100.00%

== Assessments of responses to the pandemic ==
In her October 2023 report, the Chief Public Health Officer of Canada—Dr. Teresa Tam cited the 2022 Lancet Commission report which described how COVID-19 had an uneven impact on vulnerable groups revealing stark disparities in how different segments of society were affected, highlighting pre-existing inequalities and vulnerabilities. The most impacted groups included essential workers, elderly population, indigenous communities, homeless individuals, racial and ethnic minorities, people with disabilities, those with mental health or substance abuse issues. The Lancet report stressed the importance of equity-focused resilience to address these disparities. Dr. Tam said it was crucial to prioritize equity in resilience-building efforts to ensure fair distribution of social and economic safeguards, safe and stable housing, and access to culturally appropriate healthcare. She listed key insights learned from the pandemic, including recognizing and addressing inequalities in impact and access, understanding community-specific challenges, leveraging cross-sector collaboration, and empowering trusted local organizations. Future responses would include incorporate health promotion into emergency plans, prioritizing community involvement throughout the planning cycle, and focusing on equity in emergency management research and technology.

Policy Options—a magazine published by the Institute for Research on Public Policy—published a report that assessed Canada's response to the pandemic in March 2024.

== See also ==
- 2020 in Canada
- 2021 in Canada
- 2022 in Canada
- 2022–2023 mpox outbreak in Canada
- COVID-19 pandemic by country and territory
- COVID-19 pandemic in North America
- Canada convoy protests
- National responses to the COVID-19 pandemic
- Healthcare in Canada
- Nursing home care in Canada
