= Single-use medical devices =

Medical equipment disposed of after one use

The Legislation of Single Use Medical Devices

Quentin Bryce
- Long title: Therapeutic Goods (Medical Devices) Amendment Regulations 2010 (No. 1)
- Enacted by: Quentin Bryce
- Enacted: 25 February 2010

Do not reuse symbol. All single-use medical products must contain this symbol for medical specialists to see clearly for health and safety concerns.

Single-use medical devices include any type of medical equipment, instrument, or apparatus that is disposed of after a single-use in a medical facility. The Food and Drug Administration (FDA) defines this as any device entitled by its manufacturer that it is intended use is for one single patient and one procedure only. It is not reusable and, therefore, has a short lifespan and is limited to one patient.

There are countless types of single use medical devices, ranging from external, such as plastic gumboots, gloves and bandages merely used to assist a patient to more complex and internal devices, consisting of sharp blades, needles and tubes. Both these devices are single-use due to their in contact with radioactivity, blood, infection, disease or human tissue and must therefore be terminated. Each country has its own strict legislation regarding medical waste and the reprocessing of medical devices in hospitals and clinics.

== Reasons for single-use only ==
There are multiple reasons why single-use devices are disposed of after using, which include:

=== Design features ===
The device may be manufactured a certain way, making it impossible to properly sterilize, decontaminate, and disinfect. This aspect of medical devices could possibly inflict harm on a patient if reused, causing cross-contamination to occur if the medical devices were used for different patients.

=== Patient Safety and Diminished Functionality ===
There could be excessive bacteria left over on the device, even after sterilizing, which could spark reactions and be hazardous. The cross contamination of this bacteria could contribute to the spread of HIV and Hepatitis B or C when unsterilized needles are reused to give injections. Additionally, the device could easily absorb chemical residue from disinfectant agents, contributing to the accumulation of chemical burns and chemical reactions in patients. The device might not be able to reach its supposed level of functionality after being reused or remanufactured, causing the devices' medium to become weak and impractical. This could decrease the effectiveness of the medical device when performing its clinical function, putting patients at risk for inadequate treatment and other harmful effects.

== Different devices ==
Single-use devices stretch over a large area of the medical industry. Different devices are used in every region of the world and also every area of the hospital.

First world countries would have access to a larger range of devices than third world countries, who struggle to even get in contact with medicinal products. Examples include: Hypodermic needles, syringes, applicators, bandages and wraps, drug tests, exam gowns, face masks, gloves, suction catheters, and surgical sponges. Other examples can include but are not limited to pacemakers, mercury thermometers, and tongue depressors.

Some examples of single use devices that can be reprocessed are ventilator circuits, biopsy forceps, blades and drill bits, vaginal speculums, breast pump kits, clamps and ET tubes.

Different medicinal devices have different regulations regarding patient risk, classified as Class |, Class ||, or Class ||| with an increasing risk as the classes increase in value. Examples of the devices classified in each class include:

- Class |: tongue depressors, elastic bandages, etc.
- Class ||: electrocardiographs, mercury thermometers, and bone drills
- Class |||: pacemakers, replacement heart valves, etc.

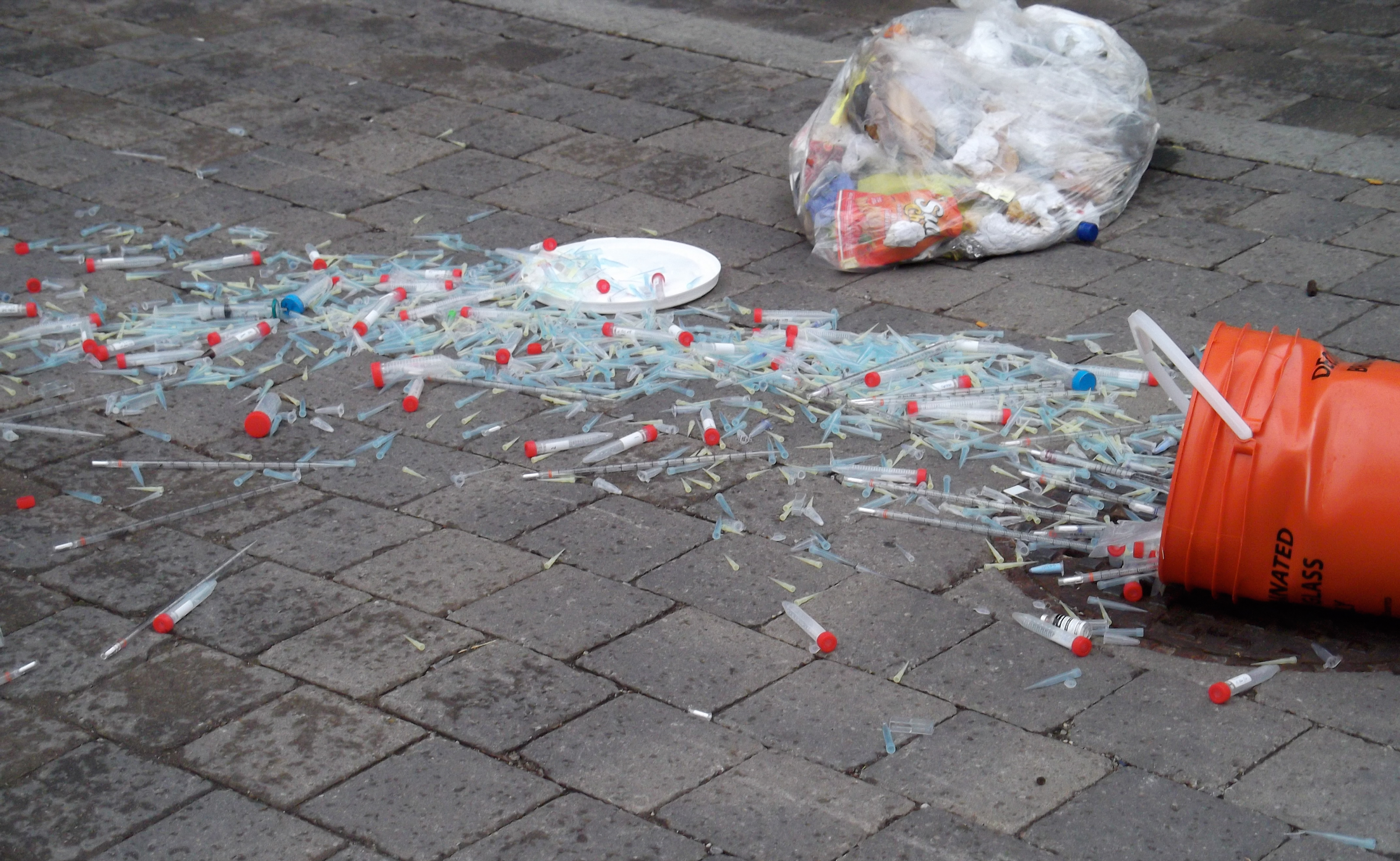
Medical waste in the form of syringes.

== Legislation ==
Each country has their own strict legislation on single use medical devices. They all feature similar overall ideas, that focus on putting a patient's health and safety first, with clear emphasis on sterilization.

=== Australia ===
"Medical devices are defined as follows by the Therapeutic Goods Act 1989 : a. any instrument, apparatus, appliance, material or other article (whether used alone or in combination, and including the software necessary for its proper application) intended, by the person under whose name it is or is to be supplied, to be used for human beings for the purpose of one or more of the following:

i. diagnosis, prevention, monitoring, treatment or alleviation of disease;

ii. diagnosis, monitoring, treatment, alleviation of, or compensation for, an injury or handicap;

iii. investigation, replacement or modification of the anatomy or of a physiological process;

iv. control of conception;

and that does not achieve its principal intended action in or on the human body by pharmacological, immunological or metabolic means, but that may be assisted in its function by such means; or

b. an accessory to such an instrument, apparatus, appliance, material or other article.

The Therapeutic Goods (Medical Devices) 2007 Regulations require a healthcare facility that reprocesses single-use devices to be licensed as a manufacturer. A healthcare facility that reprocesses single use devices would be considered to be a manufacturer under the Act and thus would be required to conform to the regulation and be subject to audit to ensure compliance."

=== Canada ===
Over a quarter of Canada's hospitals reuse single-use medical devices, a rate which resembles that of the United States. However, Canada has no national regulations regarding single-use medical devices, as all regulations that exist remain at the provisional level and are simply suggestions for compliance implemented by organizations such as Health Canada as well as The Canadian Patient Institute. Regulations may be imposed, but it is often up to the hospital or regional health authorities to implement regulation regarding single-use medical devices.

Only about 10% (43/422) of Canadian Hospitals included in a study undertaken by the Canadian Hospital Epidemiological Committee and Health Canada have in-hospital "reuse" committees and regulations regarding the safe reuse of single-use medical devices. The lack of regulation in Canadian Hospitals, therefore, leads to the excessive reuse of single-use medical devices, compromising patient health and safety.

=== United States of America ===
Legislation regarding single-use medical devices in the United States is regulated and enforced by the FDA and mostly resides in the reprocessing of single-use medical devices. Despite previous problems with the reprocessing of single-use medical devices, or SUDs, during the 1970s in an effort to save money and prevent the accumulation of medical waste, legislation has been amended since this period to regulate device manufacturers, third part reprocessors, and hospitals that reprocess SUDs. In this way, these companies are regulated the same way as original equipment manufacturers in order to promote patient safety and effectiveness of the single-use medical devices.

The FD&C Act, enacted by the U.S. Food and Drug Association (FDA), is the preliminary form of legislation that is responsible for maintaining regulation regarding the reprocessing of single-use medical devices within the United States. This act and its amendments ensure reprocessed single-use medical devices continue to comply with FDA requirements after each instance of reprocessing as well as reprocessed single-use medical devices present reprocessing validation testing upon submission to the FDA. This act exists in 3 classes:

Class | and Class || Reprocessed SUDs:

In accordance with section 501(o) within the FD&C Act, reprocessors of Class | and Class || SUDS must submit to the FDA appropriate testing and evaluation data up to the maximum number of times a single-use medical device can be reprocessed, including the following criteria:

- Cleaning
- Disinfection
- Sterilization
- Functional Performance with included rationale of maximum reprocessing capacity

Class ||| Reprocessed SUDs:

In accordance with section 501(c)(2)(A) within the FD&C Act, reprocessors of Class ||| single-use medical devices must submit a premarket report to the FDA that includes but is not limited to the following information: device name, registration number, actions taken to comply to performance standards stated in section 512 of the FD&C Act, proposed labels of reprocessed material, description of device makeup, additional necessary data, etc.

Labeling and Postmarket Requirements:

Reprocessed single-use medical devices must be labeled accordingly and include the fact that they are reprocessed and the company responsible for the reprocessing in the label. This section of the FD&C Act, section 502(v), also states that any reprocessed SUD that does not include this label will be considered "misbranded". Third party and healthcare facilities must also follow these labeling regulations, as these facilities must meet the same requirements as the original equipment manufacturers.

== Environmental concern ==
=== Production ===
The production element of single-use devices is very simple. There are multiple large manufacturing companies, that produce these medical devices, shipping them world wide to different hospitals, clinics and academic centers. The different processes, such as planning, building, producing, packaging and shipping all happen in this step of the process and is done by the manufacturers or 'third-party' companies. The devices are only received by the consumers after all aspects of the product are in perfect condition. The consumers (hospitals, clinics etc.) do not take a part in the production process, nor in the disposal or reproduction process. This is all done by 'third-party' organizations. Production of single-use medical devices leads to excessive pollution due to the plastic composition both within the device and its packaging, which is increased due to the single-use nature of the medical devices. Since these devices are only used once, more must be made, causing single-use medical devices to be the cause of 80% of the healthcare industry's carbon footprint through the devices' production, transportation, use, and disposal.

=== General medical waste ===
Plastics have been the main material used in single use devices since the 1960s, where raw materials, such as glass, rubber, metal and woven textiles were in practice before. The modern production of poly-vinyls, polycarbonates and polystyrenes have substituted these previously used materials and have dominated the disposable healthcare market ever since. The main reason for this forward driven use of plastics, was because of economic reasons, as it was cheaper and more efficiently manufactured. This drastic change in materials used in the healthcare industry positively under held the increasing need for medical procedures with a growing globally population, resulting in fundamental changes in the legislation and producing that governed medical device manufacturing, use and disposal or waste.

The single use medical devices phenomenon has only recently occurred, as these previous medical products would undergo sterilization and disinfecting onsite and be reused, but following the substitution of petroleum-based plastics, these devices would be received, used and then disposed of, which increases the quantities of medical waste enormously over the past decades globally. The production of SUDs has set trends universally in the medical industry, making it impossible to rely on any other source of device.

According to a study analyzing the reprocessing capacity of single-use medical devices, most of these devices had a percentage of polyethylene in their contents, ranging from 7%-88% for individual devices and 52% for the accumulated average. Polyethylene is a common plastic that, when improperly disposed or recycled of, leads to polyethylene pollution and decreased soil absorption capacity, promoting larger implications such as the harm of organisms within the soil as well as reduced diversity of soil microbes.

=== Hazardous medical waste ===
Although hazardous medical waste only makes up approximately 15% of all medical waste, it has a significant, observable impact on the health of populations and ecosystems. The improper disposal of hazardous medical waste leads to infectious exposure, contributing to the spread of disease amongst populations. This can be seen explicitly through the improper disposal of biohazardous material (blood, bodily fluids, plasma, etc), release of carcinogens and toxins, and exposure to used sharps, which leads to injury and potential infection. Populations that are directly impacted by hazardous medical waste include healthcare professionals, hospital staff, patients, waste collectors, and the general public as a whole.

Hazardous medical waste also has a significant impact on ecosystems and poses environmental risks. This includes water and soil contamination as a result of the release of toxins and carcinogens and air pollution as a result of current incineration methods of hazardous medical waste. The release of toxic pollutants presents threats to organisms and aquatic life within local ecosystems of landfills where this hazardous medical waste is improperly disposed of, illustrating negative environmental impact.

== Reprocessing SUD (Single-use devices) ==
=== History ===
The reuse and reprocessing of SUDs have been implemented by hospitals around four decades ago, since the late 1970s for two specific benefits; environmental and economic. Glass and metal were mainly used before this time period and heavily sanitised before reusing on another procedure, but the increasing use of the latest plastic materials and market demand for SUDs, reprocessing was fast approaching. Most SUDs, such as needles, syringes and bandages that are in direct contact with human flesh or blood are single use only by nature, but more complex SUDs, such as pacemakers commonly used in surgical procedures are often reprocessed as an economic benefit for the hospitals.

Most devices that have been categorized as single-use by their manufacturers, have now been reprocessed by third parties, to reuse. All original manufacturers of these devices try and spread the word to prevent potential dangers of infection, failure and danger. Hospitals reprocess SUDs themselves, however, only about 2-3% of SUDS can be reprocessed safely. The global income of third party SUD reprocessing companies are estimated to be $1.054 billion.

The reprocessing company, Innovative Health, has made statements concerning the reasoning behind the single-use definition, including materials involved, technical limitations, and safety. Many companies add the single-use label to increase sales. Although this is so, a small amount of SUDS actually have reusability capacity after controlled sterilization procedures.

=== Risks ===
In many developing countries the reuse and reprocessing of SUDs are simply because of cost restraints and immediate need of these medical devices, but are potentially risk-bounded, as the sterilisation and standards are not yet up to date and could possibly be a hazard for patients. A study done in African countries, reports that 15% to 60% of clinics reuse immunisation needles and syringes without proper disinfecting, resulting in increasingly large cases of unsterilised injections. 55% of North-western China's health care workers reported having used SUDs, resulting in an estimated 135 to 3120 per 100,000 population children in China to have obtained hepatitis B infections through unsafe vaccination practices.

=== Ethics and legalities ===
A national survey was performed by Canadian Agency for Drugs and Technologies in Health (CADTH) of acute care facilities in Canada in 2008, establishing that 28% of responding hospitals reprocess SUDs, but the larger amount of 42%, was done more through bigger hospitals and academic centres. They found that of the hospitals recorded, in-house reprocessing was done by 85%, resulting in 40% not having written policy approving their practice. Since the development of policies, legal issues, risks awareness and standards having to be met, many hospitals have relied heavily on third party reprocessing companies, who specialise in reprocessing, making it more convenient and assessable for them. This process includes the shipping of infected SUDs, the reprocessors sterilising and disinfecting them and then being shipped back. In many cases the hospitals would receive unknown SUDs and not their own ones.

The most common ethical issue known in the reprocessing of SUDs is patient consent. A hospital carries the responsibility the moment they adopt a reuse policy. Seeking consent by informing a patient that a reused device is being used, which could trigger unnecessary uncertainty and not requiring consent, as a hospital should only have policies that would ensure 100% patient safety if any reused devices were to be used in surgery is an ongoing discussion in the industry. Commonly, hospitals not seeking consent could be accused of 'hidden rationing', not concerning a patient's independence and putting one to risk if something were to occur and cause damage, as the likelihood of a device malfunctioning is increased with every reuse.

The economical ethics of not using a product more than once, if it is certainly capable to do so, could be viewed as unethical, as most of the time, manufacturers label these devices as single use and could arguably do so to increase sales and revenue, by hospitals constantly bulk buying, instead of focusing on patient safety as a priority.

The primary goal for the ethical reprocessing of SUDs is to protect the communal health, resulting in the patient's health being put first and to ensure the reprocessing of the devices is done ethically, cost efficiently and safely with an outcome of the reused SUD to be considered as an effective brand new product with least amount of risk.

=== Sustainability ===
From an environmental perspective, the decision to reprocess a SUD depends on the carbon footprint associated with both disposal and reprocessing. Life-cycle assessments have shown that reusable medical devices may have lower greenhouse gas emissions than single-use alternatives, especially when they can be reprocessed multiple times. However, the environmental benefits of reuse vary by device, depending on factors such as the material used, the number of reuses, cleaning and sterilization processes, packaging, and transportation.

A systematic review of 27 studies found that switching to reusable healthcare products reduced most measured environmental impacts, with global warming potential decreasing by 38-50%, but increased water usage overall. The review also found that environmental benefits depended on the number of uses and efficiency of sterilization: fully loaded autoclaves and extended device lifespans improved sustainability scores. Another systematic review of 61 medical devices found that reusable devices generally had lower carbon footprints, with manufacturing contributing most to the emissions from SUDs, and reprocessing contributing most to the emissions from reusable devices. For example, a life-cycle assessment of pulse oximeters in an emergency department found that reusable devices produced lower daily greenhouse gas emissions than single-use alternatives in all scenarios.

However, reusable devices do not always have lower environmental impacts. A life-cycle assessment of catheter insertion kits found that reusable kits generated almost three times the greenhouse gas emissions of single-use kits and used significantly more water. Overall, reprocessing may be environmentally preferable in some cases, but the entire life-cycle must be considered rather than just assuming that reusable or single-use devices are automatically more sustainable.

== Manufacturing companies ==
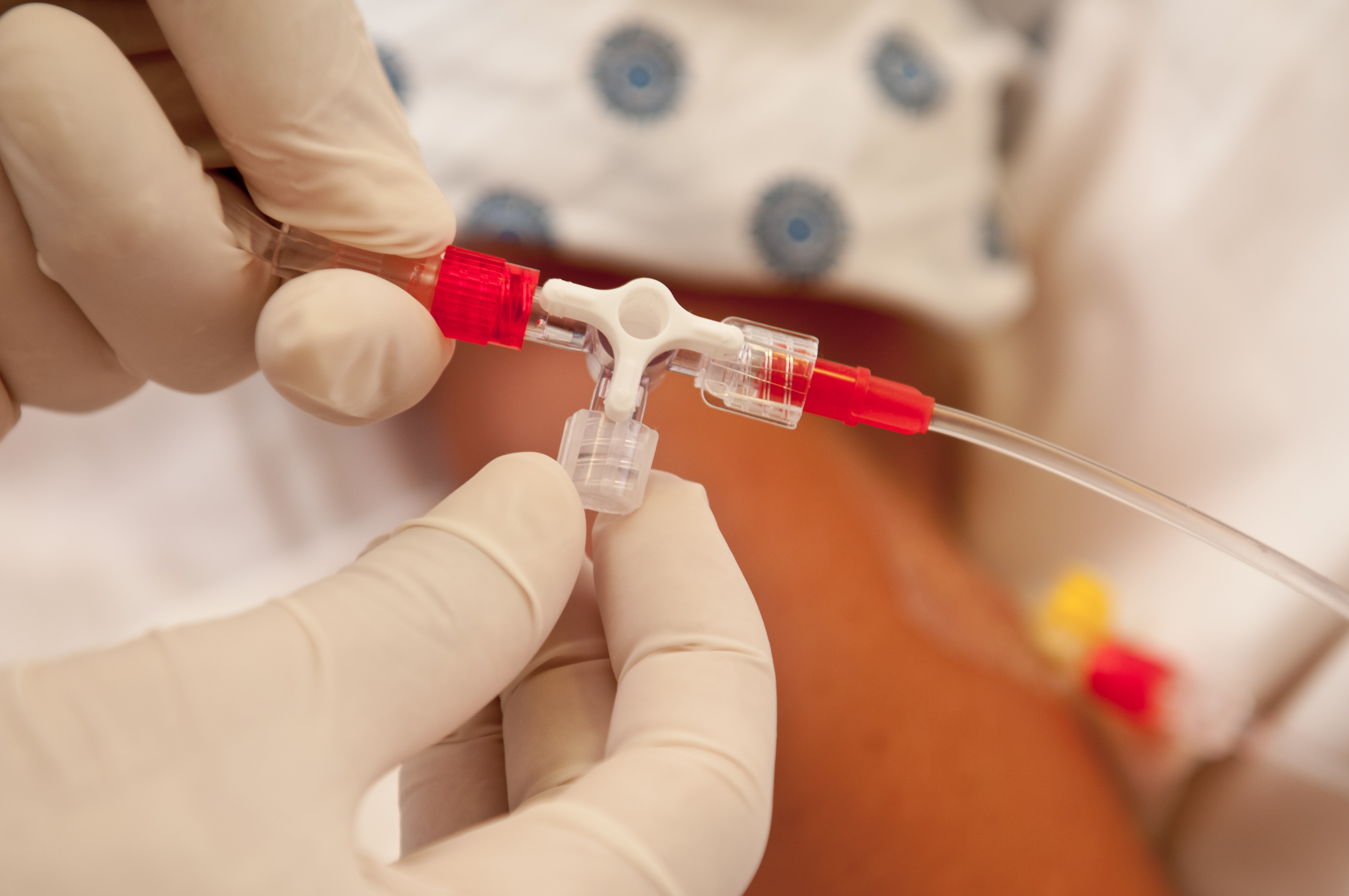
One of Elcam Medical's single-use disposable device, labelled as their "Stopcock".

There are many manufacturing companies that produce and reprocess single use medical devices safe and efficiently.

=== Elcam Medical ===
A world class producer of disposable medical devices, components for the OEM market, and provider of innovative solutions for specialised flow control needs.

=== Cadence Inc. ===
A single use medical device manufacturer catering for the OEM market. Their headquarters are in Staunton, Virginia.

=== Sterling Industries ===
Sterling Industries is a medical device contract manufacturer that assists medical device OEMs and scale-up companies with the production of their single-use medical devices.

== Reprocessing companies ==
=== Innovative Health ===
A reprocessing company, which specializes in the safe remanufacturing of SUDs, specifically Electrophysiology devices. The company is focused in efforts of making cardiology SUDS more sustainable, and the company is located in Scottsdale, Arizona.

=== Ascent Healthcare Solutions ===
A multi-million-dollar company formed by two corporations merging in 2005; Vanguard Medical Concepts and Alliance Medical Corporation. Ascent has facilities in two locations where the reprocessing of medical devices is done, Phoenix, Arizona and Lakeland in Florida. It is transported and delivered across various states in North America, providing its services to 1800 hospitals and purchasing organisations. They specialise and offer devices in the cardiovascular, orthopaedics, gastroenterology, and general surgery industries complying to the FDA's 510(k) and Quality System Regulation requirements. Their staff base includes more than 900 employees.

=== ReNu Medical ===
The 100% green FDA-registered medical reprocessing company was founded in 2000 in Everett, Washington. They focus on supplying chain saving and waste elimination, providing instant solutions to rising healthcare prices. They specialise in DVT Garments, Pulse Oximeter Probes and many other SUDs to hospitals and clinics nationwide.
