= Special advisory committee =

Special Advisory Committee (SAC) is the term given to ad-hoc groups formed in Canadian government circles to provide advice and consultation, especially public health as governed by the Public Health Agency of Canada.

== History ==
The SACs invariably have the acronym FPT or F/P/T attached to them; the acronym stands for Federal/Provincial/Territorial. The committees join civil servants in various ministries at all FPT levels of government. The FPT structure was hatched in April 2004 by Anne McLellan, who then occupied the role of Deputy Prime Minister. Her Securing an Open Society: Canada's National Security Policy document was released to public view in Parliament; and the FPT acronym was birthed. The system of national security was bestowed on that day: "a permanent, high-level federal-provincial-territorial forum on emergencies, which will allow for regular strategic discussion of emergency management issues among key national players."

Examples of such SACs are the:

- SAC on COVID-19
- SAC on the Epidemic of Opioid Overdoses
- SAC on Biological Events
- SAC on H1N1
