= Sterling Industries =

Medical device contract manufacturer

- Industry: Medical devices; Medical equipment
- Founded: 1984; 42 years ago
- Headquarters: Woodbridge, Ontario
- Area served: Worldwide
- Key people: David Van Slingerland (CEO)
- Website: sterlingindustries.com

Sterling Industries is medical device contract manufacturer with manufacturing facilities and distribution channels in the U.S., Canada and Europe. The company, established in 1984, specializes in the manufacturing and assembly of medical devices and sub-components. Sterling Industries assists medical device OEMs and scale-up companies by providing scaled production, design for manufacturing, supplier consolidation, and other essential value chain services.

== History ==
In 2007, David Van Slingerland began leading as CEO, shaping the company's strategic direction and guiding Sterling Industries through significant growth.

In 2020, the Federal Government of Canada collaborated with Sterling Industries to facilitate the production of over 15 million personal protection equipment (PPE) in response to COVID-19 pandemic. The company also signed a contract with the Government of Ontario for 11 million medical face shields and an agreement with the Province of Alberta for an additional 1 million units of PPE.

In 2022, Sterling Industries, in partnership with VentureLab, started hosting a $2.5 million MedTech lab focused on the unique hardware and semiconductor needs of healthcare companies.

== Awards and Recognition ==
In November 2022, the CEO of Sterling Industries, David Van Slingerland, was selected to receive The Order of Vaughan award, the highest honor the City of Vaughan may present.

== Community involvement ==
In August 2020, the company donated 3,000 face shields to Center for Addiction and Mental Health (CAMH) in Toronto and committed to another donation of 3,000 face shields to Mackenzie Health in Vaughan, Ontario.

In April 2021, Sterling Industries partnered with the City of Vaughan to sponsor the Activate!Vaughan Health Innovation Challenge saw the participation of 78 startups and over 100 entrepreneurs competing for grant funding.
