= Weather of 2014 =

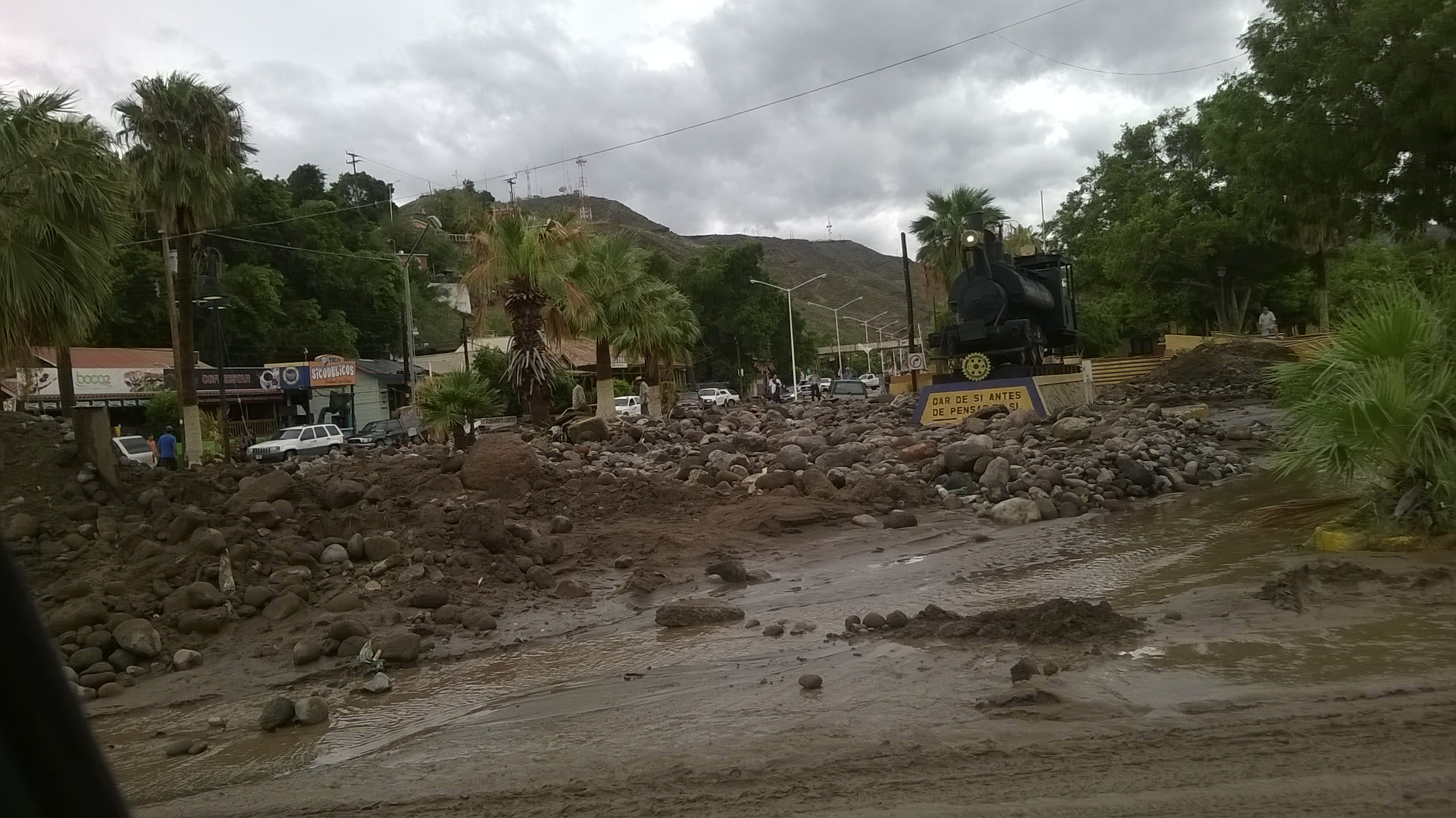
Damage in the Baja California Peninsula after Hurricane Odile

The following is a list of weather events that occurred on Earth in the year 2014. There were several natural disasters around the world from various types of weather, including blizzards, cold waves, droughts, heat waves, tornadoes, and tropical cyclones. In September, floods in India and Pakistan killed 557 people. The costliest single event was Typhoon Rammasun, which killed 225 people and left over US$8 billion in damage when it moved through the Philippines, China, and Vietnam.

== Winter storms and cold waves ==
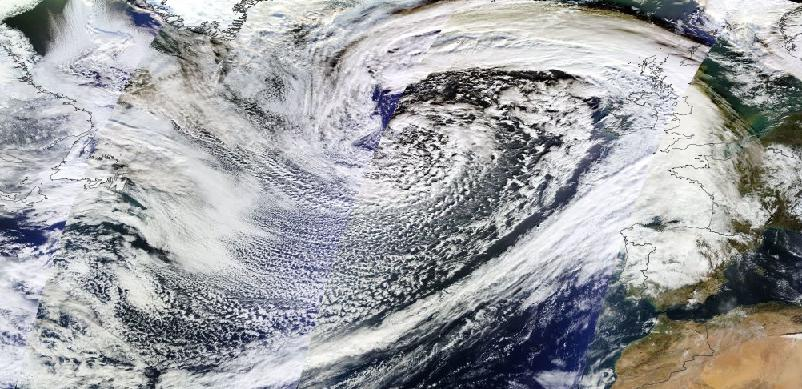
Satellite image of Cyclone Christina approaching Europe in January

A cold wave affected North America from January to April, causing US$5 billion in damage.

In January, Cyclone Christina, a European windstorm, caused three fatalities and €375 million in damage across western Europe.

In April, an avalanche on Mount Everest killed 16 people.

In November, a cold wave affected North America, and a series of winter storms killed 29 people.

Dubuque, Iowa had its coldest year on record in 2014.

== Droughts, heat waves, and wildfires ==
In April, wildfires in Chile killed 15 people.

A heat wave affected Sweden in July and culminated in the country's largest wildfire in 40 years, causing one death.

Also in July, the Carlton Complex Fire became Washington's largest single wildfire.

== Floods ==
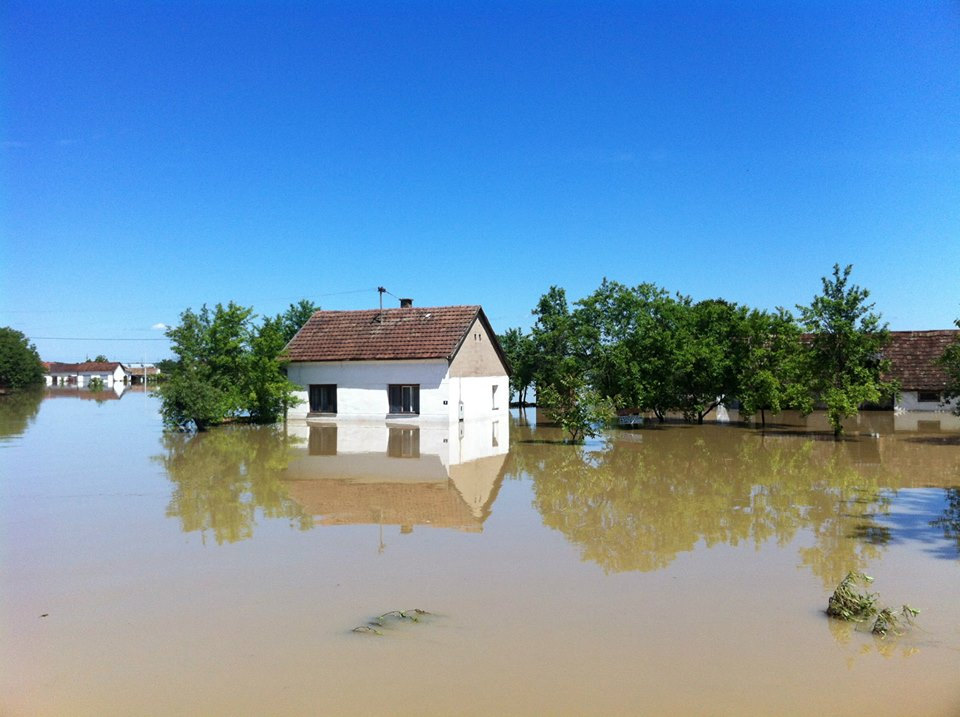
Severe flooding in Croatia

In March, a landslide in the U.S. state of Washington killed 43 people.

In May, floods in southeast Europe killed at least 86 people, with damage estimated at €3.5 billion.

In June, floods affected Bulgaria, killing 16 people. Also in June, floods in Afghanistan killed 73 people. June floods in Western Canada caused over C$1 billion in damage.

In July, a period of heavy rainfall caused a landslide in western India that killed 151 people.

In August, heavy rainfall led to a landslide in Nepal, killing 156 people and blocking the Sunkoshi river to form an artificial lake in Sindhupalchok District. Also in the month, a landslide in Japan following heavy rainfall killed 74 people.

In September, flooding affected India and Pakistan, killing 557 people.

In October, monsoonal rainfall caused a landslide in Sri Lanka, killing 16 people.

In December, heavy rainfall in Indonesia caused a landslide on Java that killed 93 people.

== Tornadoes ==
During the year, there were at least of 881 tornadoes in the United States alone, collectively resulting in 47 deaths. An outbreak in April killed 35 people and left over US$1 billion in damage.

In April, a tornado in Brazil killed one person. In July, tornadoes in Australia killed two people.

== Tropical cyclones ==
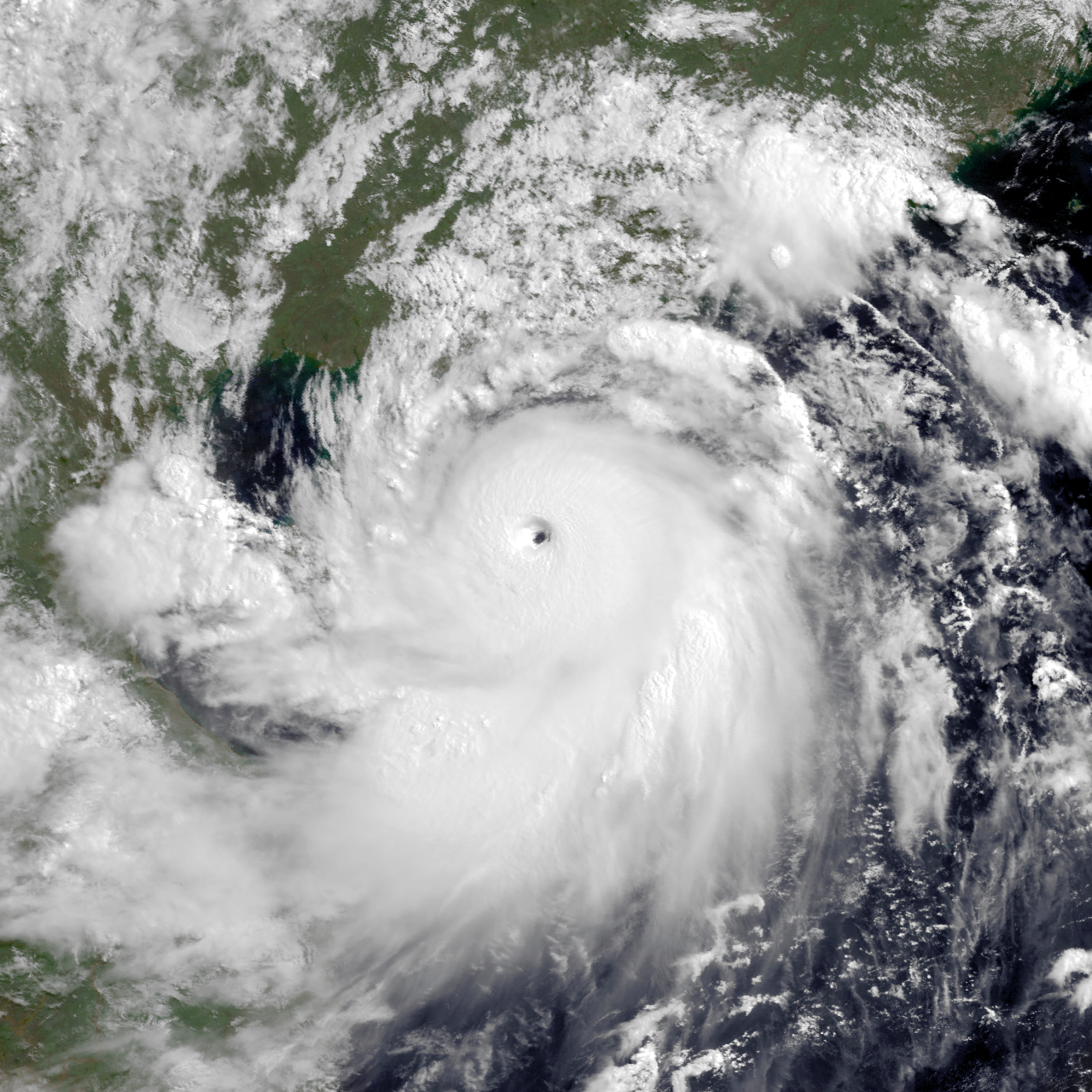
Satellite image of Typhoon Rammasun nearing China

As the year began, Cyclone Christine was dissipating over Western Australia, and Cyclone Bejisa was moving toward the Mascarene Islands in the south-west Indian Ocean. Throughout the year, a further 15 tropical cyclones developed or moved into the south-west Indian Ocean. Among these were Cyclone Hellen, which in April became one of the strongest tropical cyclones ever recorded in the Mozambique Channel, with winds of 230 km/h (145 mph) and a barometric pressure of 925 mbar (hPa; 27.32 inHg). Hellen killed eight people along its path. In the Australian region, there were 16 tropical cyclones during the year following Cyclone Christine, including powerful Cyclone Gillian, which disrupted the search for the missing Malaysia Airlines Flight 370, and Cyclone Ita, which left more than A$1.1 billion (US$1 billion) in damage in northeastern Australia. There were 19 tropical cyclones in the South Pacific, including powerful Cyclone Ian which moved near Tonga, killing one person. There were also two short-lived subtropical depressions in the South Atlantic Ocean.

In the northern hemisphere, activity began on 2 January when a depression formed near Sri Lanka. There were a further eight tropical cyclones to form in the year in the north Indian Ocean, including Cyclone Hudhud, a powerful cyclone that struck India in October. Hudhud left ₹219 billion (US$3.58 billion) in damage and killed 124 people, including 43 in Nepal related to snowstorms and avalanches. In the north-west Pacific Ocean, Tropical Storm Lingling formed on 10 January the first of 32 tropical cyclones to form in the basin that year. Lingling killed 70 people in the Philippines. The deadliest and costliest typhoon of the season was Typhoon Rammasun, which affected the Philippines, China, and Vietnam, causing 225 fatalities and over US$8 billion in damage. In the north-east Pacific Ocean, there were 23 tropical cyclones, including 16 hurricanes. The costliest Pacific hurricane in the year was Hurricane Odile, which struck the Baja California peninsula, with a damage total of MXN$16.6 billion (US$1.25 billion). The Atlantic hurricane season was quiet, with only nine tropical cyclones. Two hurricanes – Fay and Gonzalo – struck Bermuda within a one-week period. There was also a storm in the Mediterranean, Cyclone Qendresa, that had tropical characteristics, which killed three people in Italy and left over €200 million (US$250 million) in damage.

== Other storms ==
In November, a hailstorm affected the Australian city of Brisbane, causing A$1.1 billion worth of damage.

Global weather by year
Preceded by 2013	Weather of 2014	Succeeded by 2015
