= States of emergency in Canada =

A state of emergency occurs when any level of government assumes authority it does not generally possess to respond to a crisis. This is done by invoking said authority under specific legislation, and permits the government to expend funds, mobilize forces, or suspend civil liberties.

== Declarations ==
=== Federal ===
The Canadian government has declared a state of emergency four times, three in the 20th century and under the authority of the War Measures Act and one under the Emergencies Act. Under the War Measures, the three declared were:

- Ukrainian Canadian internment, 1914-1920
- Internment of Japanese Canadians and Internment of Italian Canadians, 1940-1949
- October Crisis, 1970

In 1988, Parliament replaced the War Measures Act with the Emergencies Act, which extended the powers beyond war applications. The sole application has been:

- Canada convoy protest, 2022

=== Provincial and territorial ===
Historically, states of emergency have been declared by provinces for internal issues. Save for the 2004 White Juan Blizzard, until 2020 there had never been a situation where multiple provinces made a province wide declaration. This changed during the COVID-19 pandemic where every province and territory made the declaration, opposing similar measures from the federal government. Every province has the ability to assume emergency powers under either a specific emergency act or under a public health act. In some provinces, like British Columbia, both exist and can grant specific authorities. British Columbia's Civil Defence Act was enacted in 1951 and renamed the Emergency Program Act in 1973.

List of emergency declarations in the provinces and territories 1867-2019
Year	Event	Province/Territory	Under the Authority of
1948	River flood	British Columbia	Army Act (UK)
1966	Ferry Strike	Prince Edward Island	Emergency Measures Act
1989	Forest Fires	Manitoba	
1999	Snow Storm	Quebec	
2003	SARS outbreak	Ontario	Emergency Management Act
2003	Wildfires	British Columbia	Emergency Program Act
2003	Northeast blackout	Ontario	Emergency Management Act
2004	White Juan blizzard	Nova Scotia	Emergency Measures Act
2004	White Juan blizzard	Prince Edward Island	Emergency Measures Act
2011	Floods	Manitoba	Emergency Measures Act
2013	Floods	Alberta	Emergency Management Act
2014	Assiniboine River flood	Manitoba	Emergency Measures Act
2016	Fort McMurray wildfire	Alberta	Emergency Management Act
2016	Opioid epidemic	British Columbia	Public Health Act
2017	Wildfires	British Columbia	Emergency Program Act
2018	Wildfires	British Columbia	Emergency Program Act
2019	Snow storm	Manitoba	Emergency Measures Act

List of emergency declarations in the provinces and territories 2020-
Year	Event	Province/Territory	Under the Authority of
2020	COVID-19 pandemic	Alberta (Note: Alberta has declared two states of emergency directly related to the pandemic)	Public Health Act
2020	COVID-19 pandemic	British Columbia	Emergency Program Act and Public Health Act
2020	COVID-19 pandemic	Manitoba	Emergency Measures Act
2020	COVID-19 pandemic	New Brunswick	Emergency Measures Act
2020	COVID-19 pandemic	Newfoundland and Labrador	Public Health Protection and Promotion Act
2020	COVID-19 pandemic	Nova Scotia	Health Protection Act
2020	COVID-19 pandemic	Ontario (Note: Ontario has declared three states of emergency directly related to the pandemic)	Emergency Management and Civil Protection Act
2020	COVID-19 pandemic	Prince Edward Island	Public Health Act
2020	COVID-19 pandemic	Quebec	Public Health Act
2020	COVID-19 pandemic	Saskatchewan	Emergency Planning Act
2020	COVID-19 pandemic	Northwest Territories	Public Health Act
2020	COVID-19 pandemic	Nunavut	Public Health Act
2020	COVID-19 pandemic	Yukon	Civil Emergency Measures Act
2021	Wildfires	British Columbia	Emergency Program Act
2021	COVID-19 pandemic	Ontario	Emergency Management and Civil Protection Act
2021	COVID-19 pandemic	Nova Scotia	Health Protection Act
2021	COVID-19 pandemic	New Brunswick	Emergency Measures Act
2021	COVID-19 pandemic	Alberta	Public Health Act
2021	Pacific Northwest floods	British Columbia	Emergency Program Act
2022	Freedom Convoy protest	Ontario	Emergency Management and Civil Protection Act
2023	Wildfires	British Columbia	Emergency Program Act
2023	Wildfires	Alberta	Emergency Management Act
2023	Wildfires	Northwest Territories	Emergency Management Act
2023	Floods	Nova Scotia	Emergency Management Act
2025	Wildfires	Manitoba	Emergency Measures Act
2025	Wildfires	Saskatchewan	Emergency Planning Act
