= Fraser River flood of 1948 =

1948 natural disaster in British Columbia

The Fraser River flood of 1948 was the most devastating flooding to hit Greater Vancouver in living memory. That year's floods had more than 2,300 homes were destroyed, 16,000 people displaced, and a great number of livestock killed. The population of the Lower Fraser Valley at the time was only around 50,000. At the flood's height, the water level measured 7.6 m. The areas of Abbotsford and northern Langley were particularly hard hit. The Canadian National Railway line and the Trans-Canada Highway rail lines were flooded, cutting southwestern BC off from the rest of Canada. When the waters receded, 10 were dead and 1,500 were left homeless, and between $150 and 210 million in damage had been inflicted on the area.

== Timeline ==
=== May 26th ===
A district engineer with the Dominion Power and Water Bureau, CW Webb, warns that unless there is a large change in temperature within ten days, floods will consume the Lower Fraser Valley.

=== May 28th ===
Residents began to worry about the high water levels in late May, and on May 28, the dikes at Agassiz and Nicomen Island broke. The Nicomen Island dike is described as bursting "like an atom bomb." The decision is made to evacuate Barnston Island, which is home to 35 families and over 1,000 livestock. The evacuation barges struggle in the angry river, but the operation is a success, with all but two horses making it off the island.

=== May 30th ===
On May 30, the Queensborough dike is handed over to the military, with over 70,000 sandbags already in place.

=== May 31st ===
Premier Byron Johnson declares a state of emergency in the province.

The Matsqui District declares a state of emergency. Parts of Fraser Mills and Colony Farm are flooded.

=== June 3rd ===
The Hatzic dike breaks and floods the area around Lougheed Highway.

The Association of Ontario Mayors and Reeves adopted a motion urging the Government of Ontario to fund relief efforts in BC.

=== June 8th ===
The west dike at Colony Farm breaks.

=== June 10th ===
The floodwaters peak at 7.6 m high.

=== June 11th ===
The Cloverdale Athletic Hall holds a fundraiser for the flood relief effort, which was quickly sold out.

=== June 25th ===
The floods are declared a national emergency by the federal government.

=== June 26th ===
The Fraser River receded to the 20-foot mark, the edge of the danger zone.
