= January 2–4, 2014 North American blizzard =

Weather event in North America

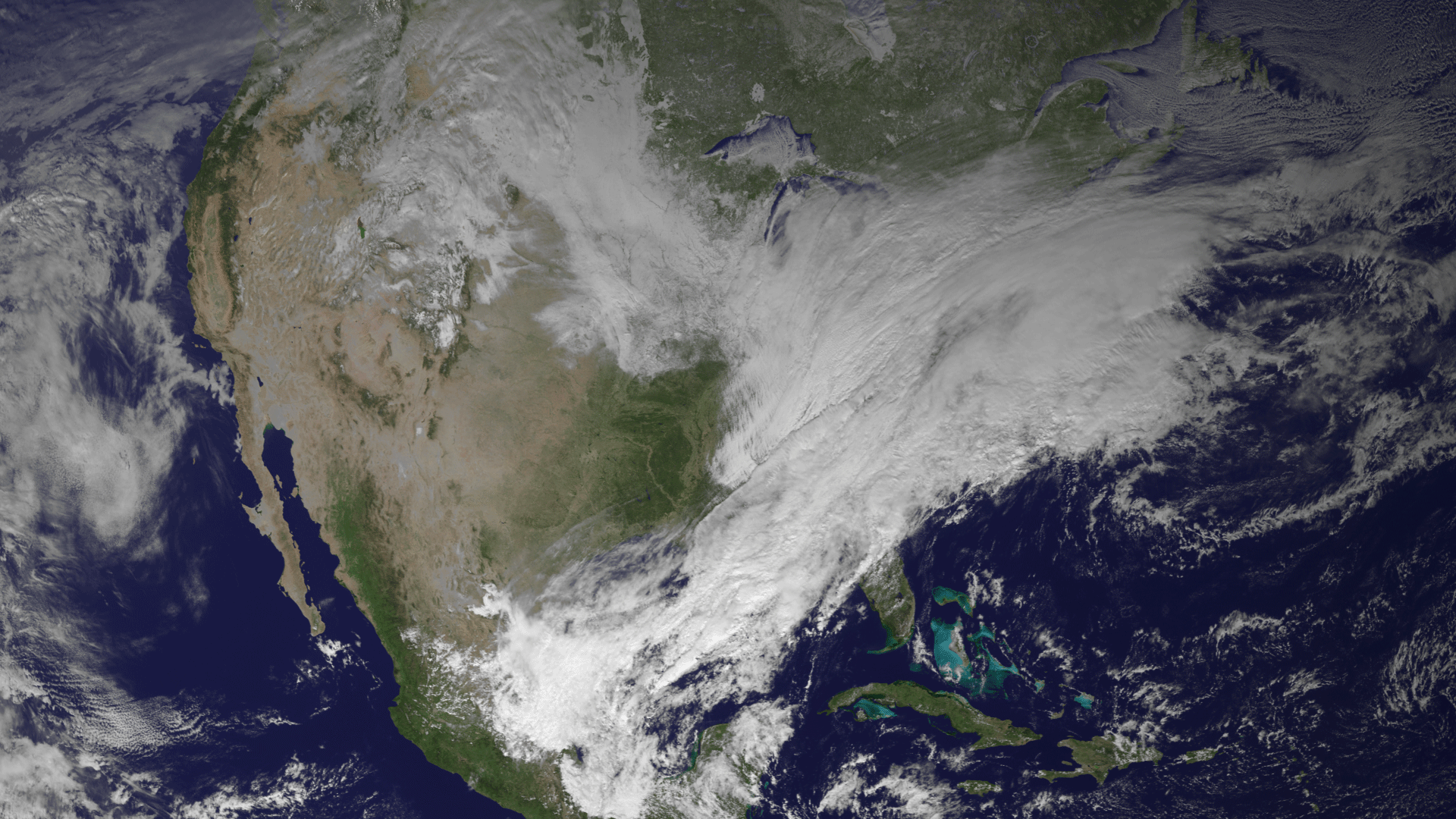
- The winter storm approaching the East Coast late on January 2.

Meteorological history
- Formed: December 30, 2013
- Dissipated: January 6, 2014

Category 2 "Minor" winter storm
- Regional snowfall index: 3.22 (NOAA)
- Lowest pressure: 936 mbar (hPa); 27.64 inHg
- Lowest temp: −2 °F (−19 °C) (Post-storm)
- Max. snowfall: 23.8 in (0.60 m) in Boxfield, Massachusetts

Overall effects
- Fatalities: 16
- Damage: $2.6 billion
- Areas affected: Central United States, Eastern United States, Atlantic Canada, Western Europe
- Part of the 2013–14 North American winter

The January 2–4, 2014 North American blizzard was a major winter storm that affected much of the East Coast with snow, and frigid temperatures following the storm. The storm, unofficially referred to as Winter Storm Hercules by the Weather Channel, had dumped up to 2 ft (0.61 m) of snow in some areas, especially around Boston, Massachusetts.

== Meteorological synopsis ==
On December 31, 2013, a low-pressure area formed near the Montana/Canada border and moved southward, along an arctic front, as a snow band formed ahead of the arctic front and extended from the central Great Plains to the lower Great Lakes region. The next day, the low-pressure area moved further south towards Texas, while continuing to produce snowfall across the Great Plains. The low then moved northeastward, reaching West Virginia on January 2, before dissipating. The same day, a second low-pressure area formed across the southern Appalachian Mountains, rapidly intensifying while moving off the Mid-Atlantic and over the Gulf Stream as several weak low-pressure areas were also embedded with the complex low-pressure system.

Early on January 3, the winter storm produced blizzard conditions, high wind gusts, and cold temperatures across portions of the Northeastern United States. Several hours later, the low-pressure area moved away from the United States, though snow showers lingered throughout the Northeast. After it had left the coast early that morning, it continued to strengthen and turn to the northeast, and late on January 4, it reached its peak intensity of 936 millibars (27.6 inHg) while situated near Greenland. It was then absorbed into another extratropical cyclone, which later developed into Cyclone Christina which brought high winds to western Europe several days later.

== Aftermath and cold wave ==
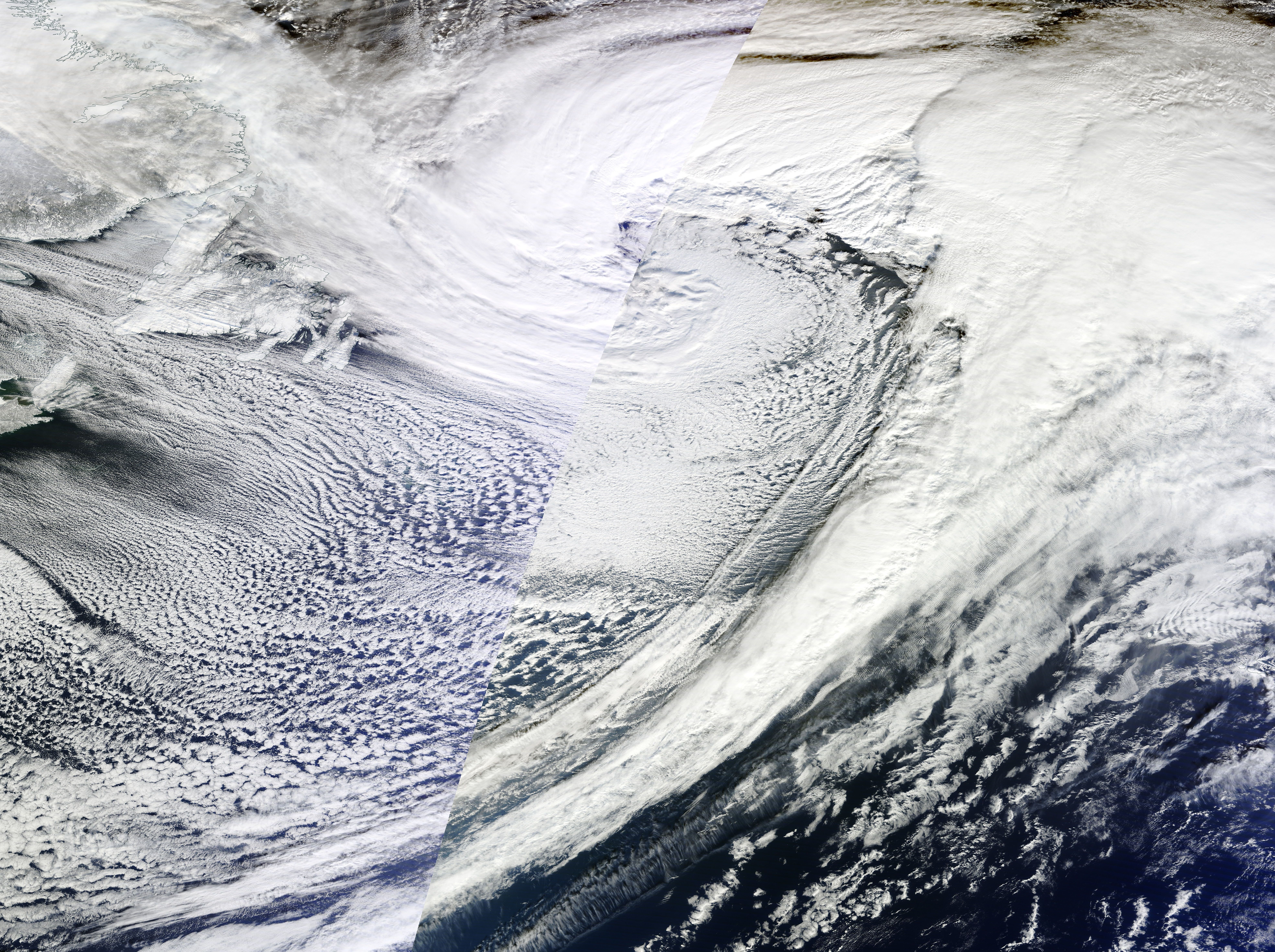
Cyclone Christina (seen east of Newfoundland on January 4) later developed from the remnants of the nor'easter, bringing high winds and flooding to Western Europe.

After the storm passed, an arctic front associated with it passed through the region, bringing record cold temperatures in the eastern half of the United States.

On January 3, Boston had a temperature of 2 °F (−17 °C) with a −20 °F (−29 °C) wind chill, and over 7 inches (18 cm) of snow. Boxford, Massachusetts recorded 23.8 inches (60 cm). Fort Wayne, Indiana had a record low of −10 °F (−23 °C). In Michigan, over 11 inches (28 cm) of snow fell outside Detroit and temperatures around the state were near or below 0 °F (−18 °C). New Jersey had over 10 inches (25 cm) of snow, and schools and government offices closed. Over a dozen deaths were attributed to the cold wave, with dangerous roadway conditions and extreme cold cited as causes.

Evan Gold of weather intelligence firm Planalytics called the storm and the low temperatures the worst weather event for the economy since Hurricane Sandy just over a year earlier. 200 million people were affected, and Gold calculated the impact at $5 billion. $50 to $100 million was lost by airlines which cancelled a total of 20,000 flights after the storm began on January 2. JetBlue suffered because 80% of its flights go through New York City or Boston. Parents could not go to their offices and had to conduct remote work. Not included in the total were the insurance industry and government costs for salting roads, overtime and repairs.

== See also ==
- Mid-February 2015 North American blizzard – A similar storm that brought record cold temperatures behind it in its wake.
- March 2014 nor'easter
- November 2014 North American cold wave
- February 9–11, 2017 North American blizzard - A similar storm that produced similar snow totals in the same areas.
