= White Juan =

February 2004 extratropical cyclone in the North Atlantic

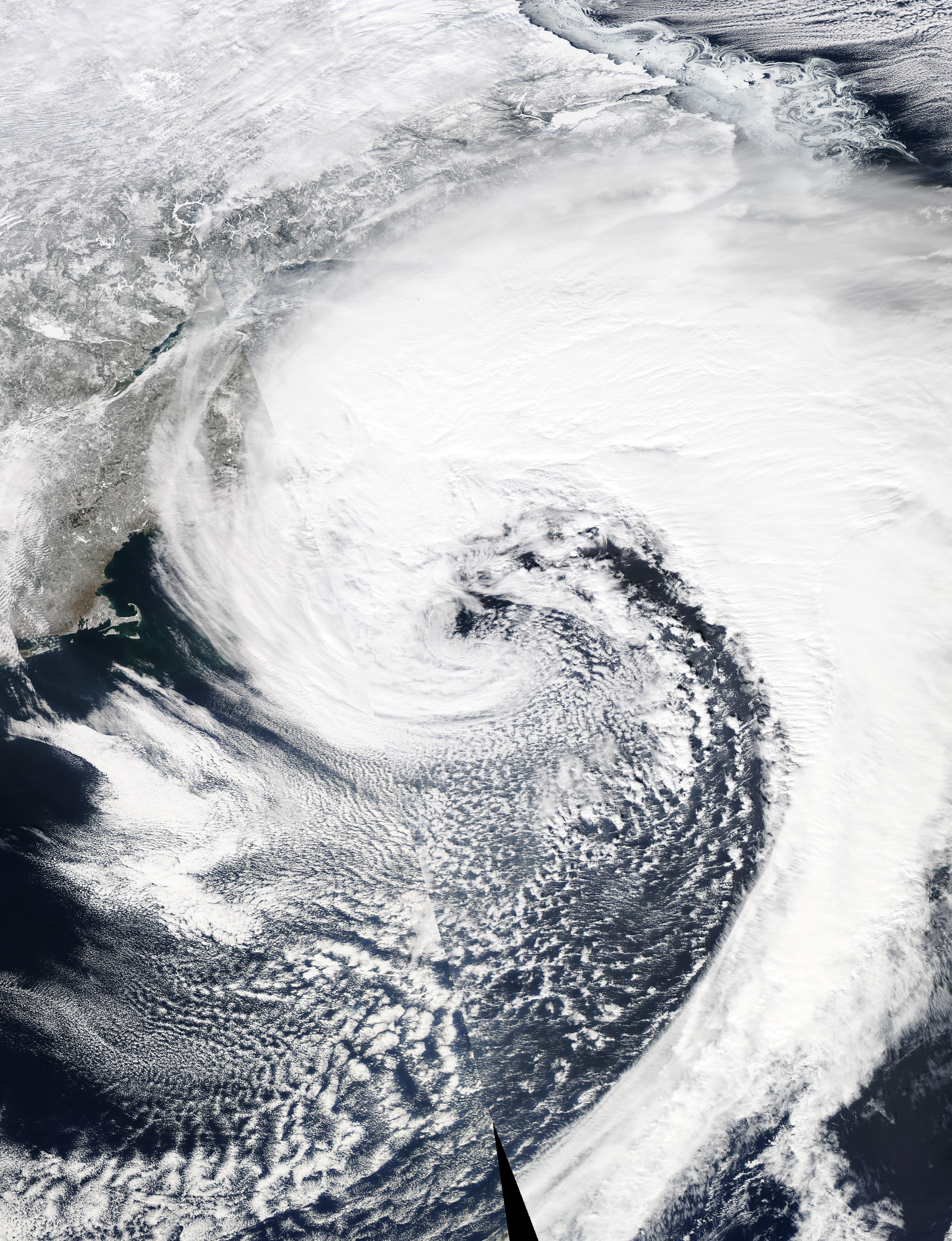
- Aqua satellite imagery of the extratropical cyclone responsible for the blizzard on February 19

Meteorological history
- Formed: February 17, 2004
- Dissipated: February 23, 2004

Extratropical cyclone
- Highest winds: 77 mph (124 km/h)
- Lowest pressure: 959
- Lowest temp: −8 °F (−22 °C)
- Max. snowfall: 95.5 centimetres (37.6 in) at Shearwater heliport

Overall effects
- Damage: $1 million (2004 USD)
- Areas affected: Eastern United States; Atlantic Canada

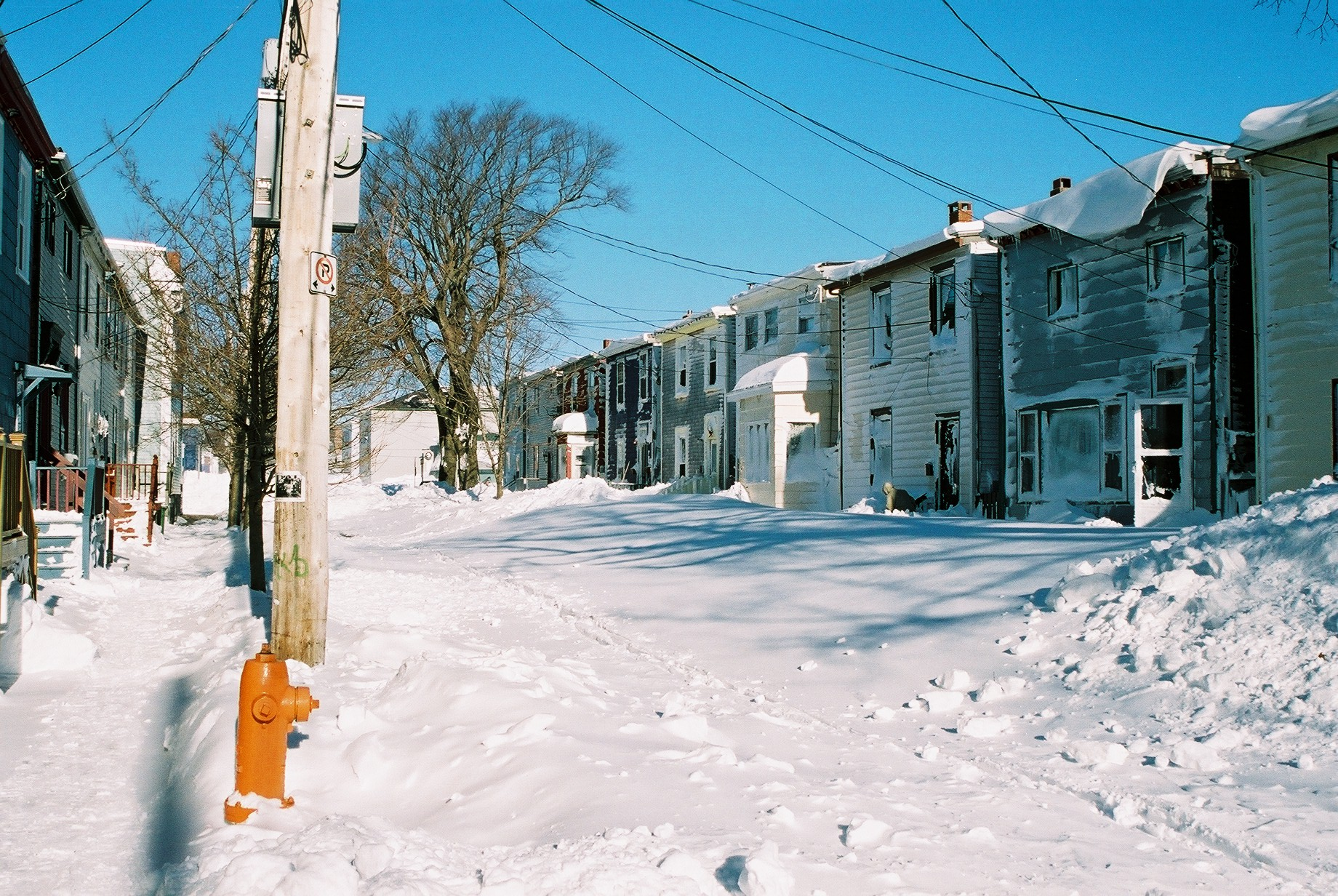
Snow from White Juan covers the 2300 block of Maynard Street in Halifax making passing impossible.

White Juan is the unofficial name given to the hurricane-strength nor'easter blizzard of February 2004 that affected most of Atlantic Canada and the Eastern United States between February 17 and 20, 2004—five months after Hurricane Juan devastated Nova Scotia and Prince Edward Island. The storm dropped heavy snowfall throughout the Nova Scotia peninsula and Prince Edward Island, with accumulations in the hardest-hit areas ranging from 50 to 100 centimetres (20 to 39 in).

== Meteorological history ==
The storm formed approximately 200 kilometres (120 mi) southeast of Cape Hatteras, North Carolina, on February 17, 2004. It intensified over the Gulf Stream, moving at 35–40 km/h (22–25 mph) before striking Atlantic Canada.

== Impacts ==
Snow fell at a rate of 5 centimetres (2.0 in) per hour for 12 consecutive hours, and sustained winds blew at up to 124 kilometres (77 mi) per hour.

The snowstorm dropped a record-breaking 95.5 centimetres (37.6 in) of snow on Shearwater heliport, beating the previous record of 73.2 centimetres (28.8 in) set February 1, 1960. It also broke the record for the most snow in Yarmouth with 82.0 centimetres (32.3 in) of snow, surpassing the 67.8 centimetres (26.7 in) that fell on January 16, 1977. Charlottetown also broke their all time daily snowfall record with 74.4 centimetres (29.3 in).

Numerous unofficial reports placed a snowfall of nearly 150 centimetres (59 in) in many regions across the province. The storm also produced sustained winds ranging from 60 to 80 km/h through much of New Brunswick, Nova Scotia, Prince Edward Island, and Newfoundland and Labrador with maximum 1-minute gusts of 120 kilometres (75 mi) per hour reported at many stations. Much of central, northern and western New Brunswick received little to no snow or wind as the storm tracked toward the east.

Two weather stations in the Halifax Regional Municipality reported 10-second gusts nearing 147 kilometres per hour (91 mph). However, these reports have never been confirmed by Environment Canada. Weather radar observations, as well as synoptic report, showed extensive thundersnow embedded within the blizzard; in the heaviest bands, accumulation rates exceeded 20 centimetres per hour (7.9 in/h).

The wind combined with the intense snow rates produced visibilities of 1 metre (3.3 ft) or less in most areas for brief periods, however these conditions persisted for at least eight hours in much of Nova Scotia. The wind also whipped up snow drifts which in some cases covered two and three-storey buildings and made many roads impassable to both common motor vehicles and snow removal equipment.

The humid continental climate of coastal Nova Scotia typically does not experience extreme snowfalls, compared with northern Nova Scotia, Cape Breton Island, Prince Edward Island and New Brunswick. Thus the blizzard and heavy snowfall had a crippling effect on the Halifax Urban Area for several days following the storm as public works personnel struggled to clear streets and roads. For several nights following the storm, a 10 p.m. curfew was implemented on residents in the Halifax Regional Municipality to permit operation of snow removal equipment. Due to a lack of space to displace the excess snow, the municipality had to receive permission from the federal government to begin dumping the snow into Halifax Harbour from federally owned docks in addition to the usual privately owned docks.

The storm also had an effect on the 2004 Special Olympic National Winter Games, which were being held in Charlottetown.

=== Snowfall amounts for February 18–19 ===
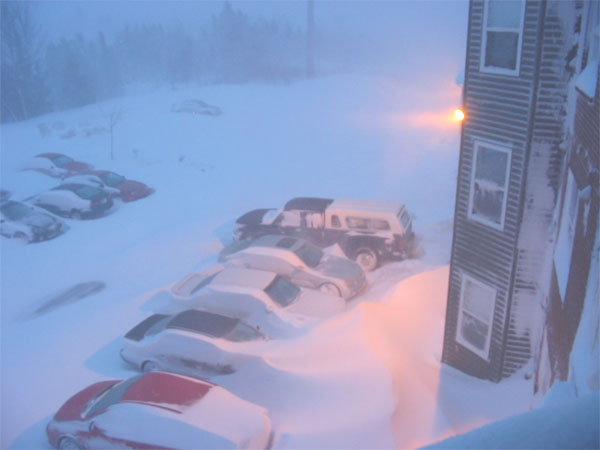
The aftermath of White Juan

- Halifax and Dartmouth: 95.5 centimetres (37.6 in)
- Yarmouth: 101 centimetres (40 in)
- Charlottetown: 74.4 centimetres (29.3 in)
- Halifax International Airport: 66.8 centimetres (26.3 in)
- Enfield: 66.6 centimetres (26.2 in)
- Moncton: 61.2 centimetres (24.1 in)
- Port Hawkesbury: 50 centimetres (20 in)
- Baddeck: 49 centimetres (19 in)
- Sydney: 40.8 centimetres (16.1 in)
- Saint John: 25 centimetres (9.8 in)
- Miramichi: 3.5 centimetres (1.4 in)
- Fredericton: 1.5 centimetres (0.59 in)
- Bathurst: 0.5 centimetres (0.20 in)

=== School cancellations ===
All schools were closed in Nova Scotia and Prince Edward Island as province-wide states of emergency were declared.

=== Marine effects ===
The storm produced hurricane-force winds out at sea with 10–15 meters (33–49 ft) swells, prompting a special marine warning. A storm surge equivalent to that associated with a Category 1 hurricane also affected portions of the Northumberland Strait in southeast New Brunswick and to a lesser extent Prince Edward Island.

=== Financial impacts ===
In 2011, the Halifax Regional Municipality announced that it had submitted bills to the federal government totalling $19.9 million in the wake of Hurricane Juan and White Juan, and that it was still waiting for nearly $6 million.

It was not until ten years later that the federal government announced that it would pay the province $3.6 million under the Disaster Financial Assistance Arrangements program which helps cover the costs of evacuations, emergency shelters and infrastructure.

== See also ==
- North American blizzard of 2006
- Early February 2013 North American blizzard
- January 2018 North American blizzard
