= Cyclone Anne (2014) =

2014 European windstorm

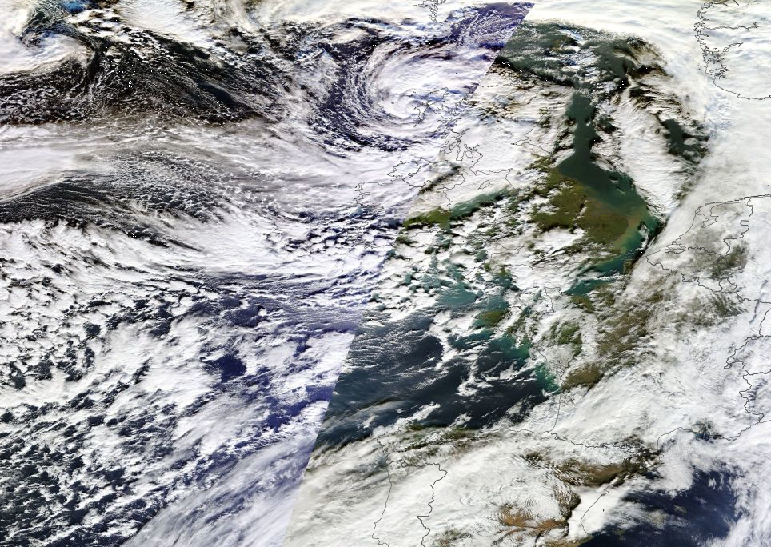
- Cyclone Anne on 3 January 2014

Meteorological history
- Formed: 1 January 2014
- Dissipated: 6 January 2014

European windstorm
- Lowest pressure: 945 mb (27.9 inHg)

Overall effects
- Damage: €75 million
- Areas affected: Republic of Ireland, United Kingdom, France, Channel Islands, Isle of Man, Spain, Portugal

Cyclone Anne was a European windstorm which caused €75 million in damage across western Europe in early January 2014, followed days later by Cyclone Christina.

== Meteorological history ==
The low pressure system was named Anne by the Free University of Berlin on 1 January. Some media referred to Anne as the "Moon Storm".

=== Storm surge ===
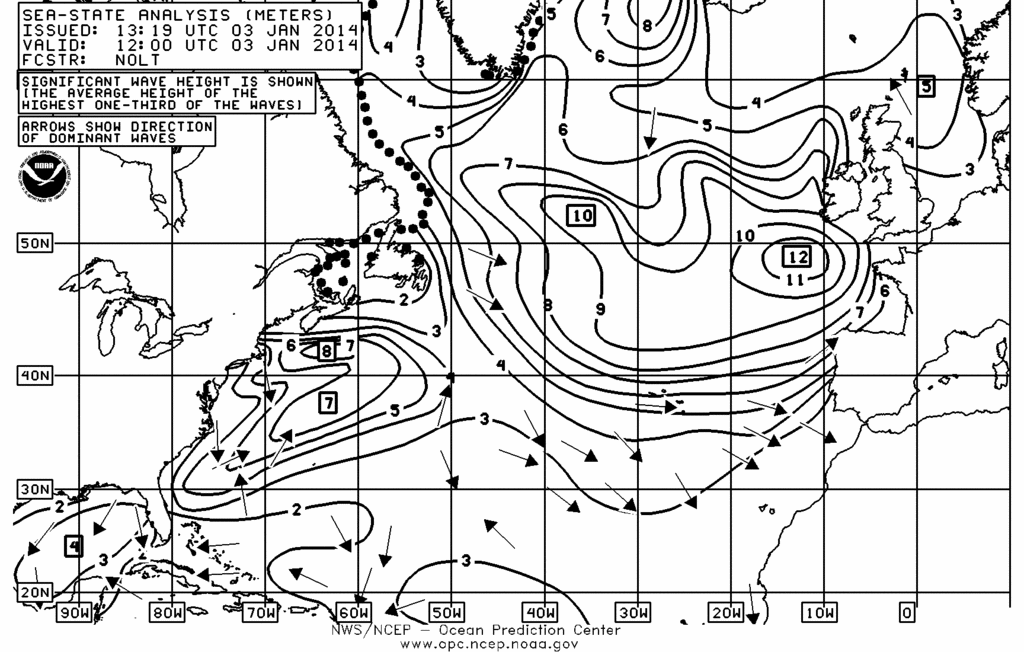
Significant wave height North Atlantic 3 January 2014

The Anne storm was deepened by the powerful jet stream, one of a series of lows which deepened below 950hPa (for every 1hPa drop in atmospheric pressure, sea level goes up by 1 cm) which is capable of adding over half a meter to sea levels. The storm coincided with high spring tides, and high discharge levels in rivers and estuaries. The long fetch of winds over the western Atlantic pushed water against the coasts, and helped to develop some significant wave heights, especially where the coastal morphology acts to funnel the waves.

== Forecast ==
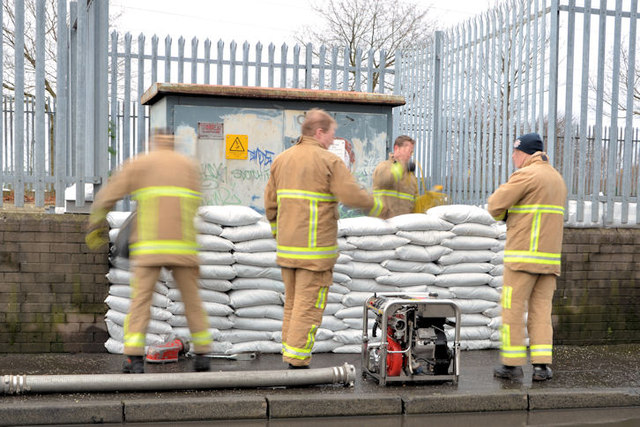
Protecting electrical equipment in Belfast ahead of the storm

Meteo France issued an orange alert in Brittany for the departments of Morbihan and Ille-et-Vilaine, the warning level was raised to red for the department of Finistère. The Jersey Met Office gave out a red alert, its highest level of warning.

In the UK the Environment Secretary Owen Paterson, after chairing a Cobra meeting on 2 January, said the country was facing "exceptional weather". Cork City Council warned of coastal flood threat in low-lying areas of the city.

The Isle of Man Government issued a red warning (the highest) for Friday 3 January, advising that water levels were expected to be 800mm above harbour walls. Water heights were expected to be higher than a surge event in 2002, which caused 8 million pounds of damage on the island. Islanders were warned of the danger posed by contaminated water and open manhole covers; and vulnerable roads around the island were closed.

Natural Resources Wales advised that it was expecting the highest tide to hit the entire Welsh coast since 1997.

The Scottish Environment Protection Agency issued warnings on 2 January for coastal flooding on the west coast. It did not initially put out a flood alert for Stornoway in the Western Isles, but later issued one.

Coastal warnings were also in place along the north Spanish and Portuguese west coasts on 3 January.

== Impact ==
The Channel Islands saw wind gusts reach 87 miles per hour (140 km/h) on Alderney, with gusts of 75 miles per hour (121 km/h) in Jersey.

The storm brought heavy showers, with reports of large hail and lightning strikes causing damage. A thunderstorm in Exeter knocked out some traffic lights in the city. Lightning strikes were also responsible for stopping all rail transport in and out of Cornwall as signalling equipment was damaged near to Liskeard on 3 January. In Aylesbury four families were evacuated from their block of flats after the building was hit by lightning. Hail larger than a one pence coin (20mm diameter) was reported in Somerset, and mammatus cloud on the south coast of England in Bognor Regis.

The sea front of Exmouth was closed after a number of trees fell.

Numerous sporting fixtures were disrupted in the United Kingdom.

Saturated ground and heavy seas led to a section of cliff to collapse at Rock-a-Nore, near Hastings, East Sussex, which was filmed.

=== Storm surge ===
Coastal areas from Brittany to Scotland along the south and west coasts of Britain saw high seas. In Ireland coastal flooding was worst in the south and west of the country, but some flooding was noted on all coasts.

In France, Quimperlé, Finistere flooded again, after previously flooding during Cyclone Dirk in December 2013. Flooding was also reported in Morlaix and Quimper. 10,000 homes were left without power in north west France.

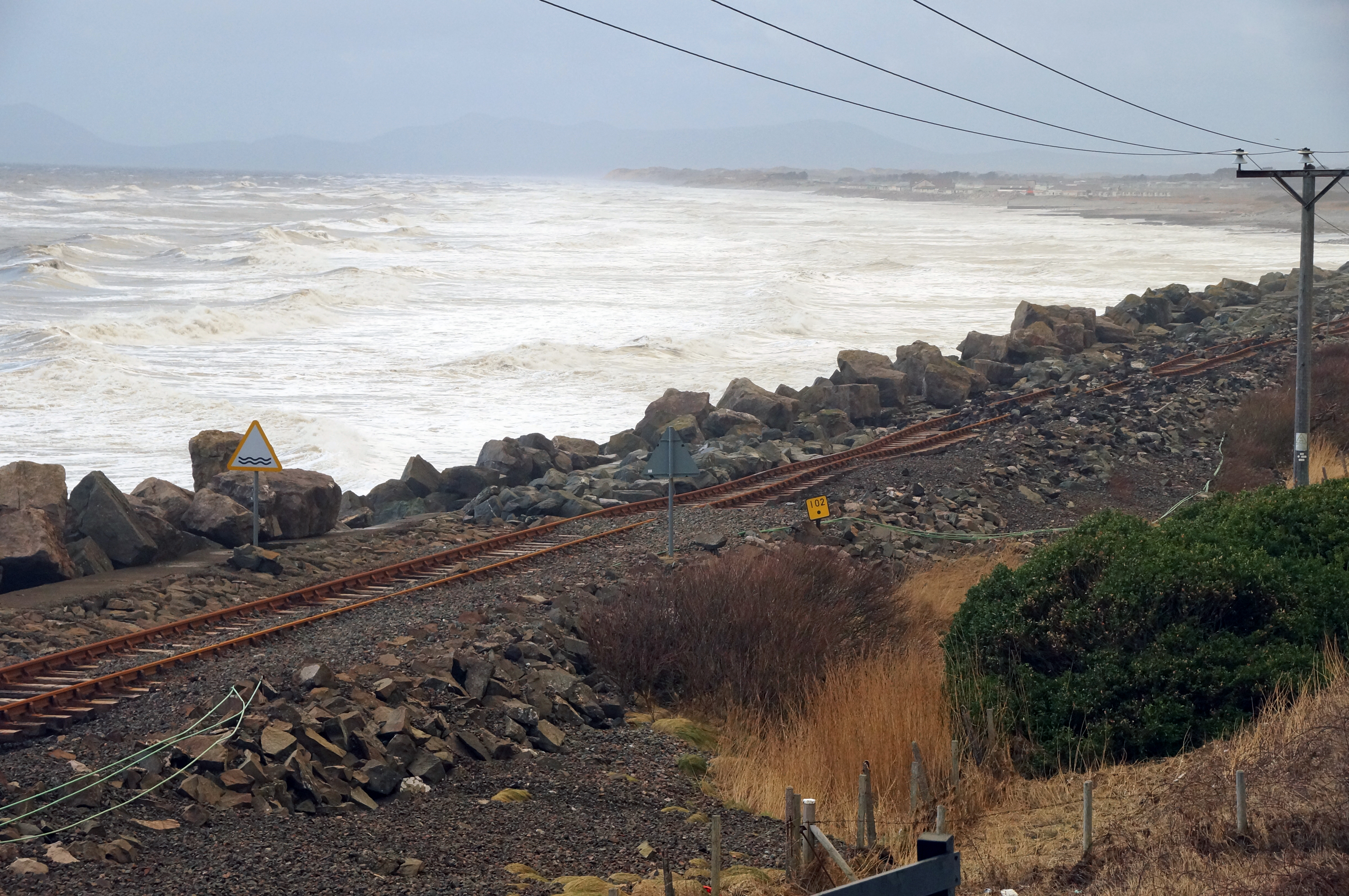
Wave damage caused on 3 January on the Cambrian coastal line at Llanaber, Wales

Coastal flooding was expected to be worst in the South West of England in Cornwall and Devon. The Environment Agency estimated that 130 homes had been flooded in England, with flood defences serving to protect 130,000 properties.

Devon County Council reported 35 homes and businesses flooded, with Lynmouth, Bishops Tawton, Bideford, East-the-Water on the north coast, and Dartmouth and Salcombe on the south coast worst affected.

In Looe flooding subsided by 10:30am as the tide lowered on 3 January. Polperro and Mevagissey were also reported as having some flooding.

At Portreath a section of the quay was washed away. Further along the north Cornish coast at Perranporth saw some flooding on the morning 3 January. Newquay saw part of Beach Road in resort collapse. At Porthcothan stormy seas caused a Natural arch to collapse.

In Bristol the Portway which runs by the River Avon was partially blocked with debris. Also in the city the Cumberland Basin flooded with new temporary flood barriers erected for the first time to protect housing.

The Severn bore combined with high water leading to flooding in Gloucestershire, as the river burst its banks at Minsterworth, Maisemore, Elmore and Newnham.

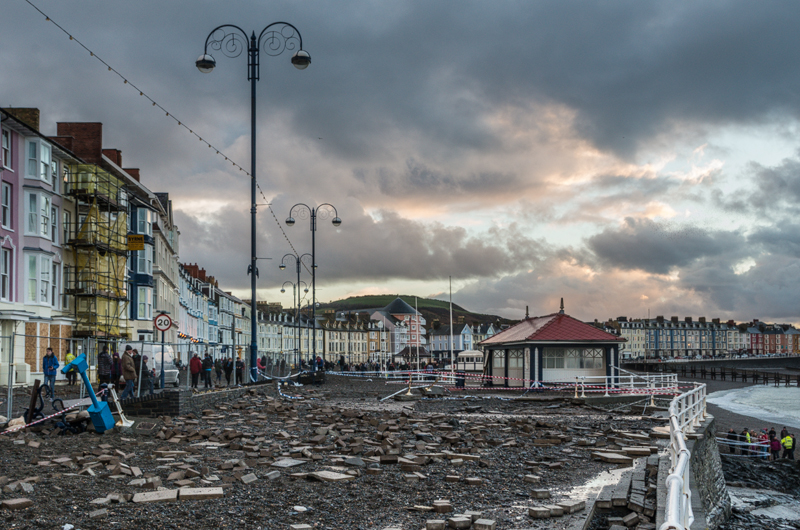
Aberystwyth promenade 4 January

Widespread coastal flooding and damage occurred in Ireland. Flooding was reported in Cork and County Cork. Flooding began in Cork on 2 January evening tide at 17:45. Clare County Council described the promenade at Lahinch as "seriously compromised" following the storm. Images of waves lashing the promenade and spray blowing over the normally popular surfing location, were captured. Several families were evacuated from homes in the village after homes flooded. There were further reports of damage across County Clare in Doolin, Spanish Point and Quilty. Inishbofin in County Galway saw heavy seas, which caused extensive damage on the island, including a lighthouse beacon swept off its foundations.

In Northern Ireland parts of Coleraine in County Londonderry were flooded after the River Bann overflowed, several coastal roads around the region were closed because of flooding.

The Isle of Man Government said low-lying port areas were affected, with parts of Ramsey losing electricity, though damage appeared minimal.

In Wales 30 homes were flooded in Cardigan.

Water flows over an embankment near Talsarnau Gwynedd

On the Welsh coast 100 residents were evacuated from vulnerable homes in Borth and Aberystwyth. Aberystwyth was hit by destructive high waves for the second time this winter, after it was hit by a storm which followed the St. Jude storm on 2–3 November 2013. Aberystwyth sea front has previously been severely damaged by storms in October 1927 and January 1938.

Damage occurred to sea defences and gardens at St Bees, Cumbria.

In Scotland Dumfries and Galloway Council reported homes flooded on the Solway Firth at Annan, Powfoot and Carsethorn. Also homes along the coast in Kirkcudbright, Garlieston, the Isle of Whithorn, Port William and Portpatrick.

=== Inland flooding ===
The Somerset levels saw an increase in water levels, with the Environment Agency bringing in extra pumps to try and manage the water on the flooded moors, which was being hampered as the Agency had to wait for river levels to drop. All major roads into Yeovil were cut off by flood waters on 4 January, with police advising against all travel to the town after the A37 and A359 became impassable.

== Aftermath ==
The storm's impacts came on the day when the British Government announced that the Environment Agency in the UK would shed 1500 jobs (approximately a tenth of its staff) political questions were raised about the ability of the Agency to deal with future floods. The Government said it was spending more than the previous administration. Initial assessments by Irish local authorities put damage in millions of euros. Aberystwyth University asked students (many of whom were still on Christmas holiday) to not return until after midweek the next week, with fears of further damage from winter storm Christina.

Two trains were trapped at Barmouth, after 300 tonnes of track bed on the Cambrian Coast Line was washed away, depositing 800 tonnes of debris on the line causing its closure between Barmouth and Pwllheli at Llanaber. The trains were eventually moved to Chester by road.
