= Emergency Management and Civil Protection Act =

Ontario, Canada statute

Legislative Assembly of Ontario
- Citation: RSO 1990, c. E.9
- Territorial extent: Province of Ontario
- Commenced: 30 June 2006
- Status: In force

The Emergency Management and Civil Protection Act (French: Loi sur la protection civile et la gestion des situations d'urgence) is an Act of the Legislative Assembly of Ontario that grants the Premier of Ontario and the Executive Council of Ontario the authority to declare a state of emergency. It was previously named the Emergency Management Act.

The Act grants to the Lieutenant Governor of Ontario the authority to suspend for an explicitly specified duration a set of legal provisions enabling the Government of Ontario to expediently respond to public emergencies and assist victims.

== History ==
The Emergency Management and Civil Protection Act replaced the Emergency Management Act of 2002, which had replaced the Emergency Plans Act of 1983. One of the primary changes from previous Acts was the inclusion of emergencies related to disease or health risks, resulting from the poor response of the Government of Canada and Government of Ontario to the 2002–2004 SARS outbreak in Canada, centred in Toronto. The response was described as "very, very basic and minimal at best".

=== Uses ===
The Emergency Management and Civil Protection Act was used to declare an emergency during the COVID-19 pandemic in Ontario in 2020 and in 2021.

The Act was also used to declare an emergency in response to the Freedom Convoy 2022 demonstrators in January 2022.

== Requirements ==
The Act requires all ministries of the Government of Ontario to create an emergency management plan.

The Premier of Ontario (via the Lieutenant Governor of Ontario) along with cabinet can invoke this legislation for up to 14 days and at the end of the 14 days can order a one-time extension of up to 14 additional days. At the end of such an extension, only the Legislative Assembly of Ontario can authorize a further extension of up to 28 additional days. When the declared emergency expires, the government has to report to the Legislative Assembly of Ontario within 120 days to review the declaration and actions taken.

=== Municipalities ===
The Act requires all municipalities in Ontario to develop an emergency preparedness and response program, the standards for which are defined in Ontario Regulation 380/04.

Amongst its requirements are the development of an emergency plan, an annual training program for emergency response personnel, an annual response exercise program, public education campaigns, and to execute a Hazard Identification and Risk Assessment.

Each municipality must establish an emergency operations centre and designate an emergency management coordinator.

== Effects ==
A declaration of a state of emergency under the Act may result in the temporary suspension of employment for some individuals, for example because they are required to provide assistance to a member of the family. In such cases, the affected individuals are protected by the Employment Standards Act, which entitles them to an unpaid leave of absence.
