= 2014 Västmanland wildfire =

2014 wildfire in central Sweden

Coordinates: 59.90°N 16.15°E

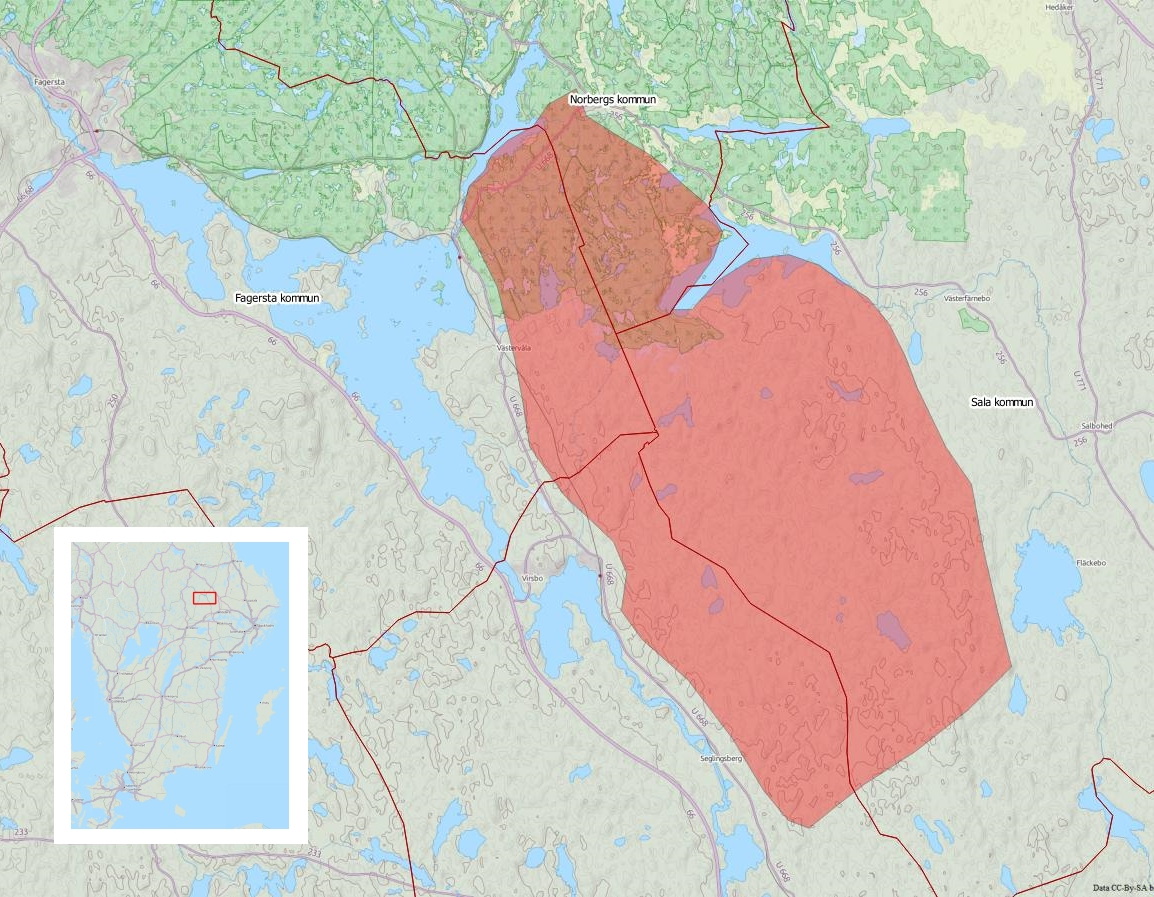
- Date: 31 July 2014-11 August 2014
- Location: Västmanland, Sweden

Statistics
- Burned area: 15,000 hectares (37,000 acres)

Impacts
- Deaths: 1 civilian
- Injuries: 1 civilian; 9 firefighters
- Structures lost: 80 homes; 79 outbuildings; 1 commercial property

Ignition
- Cause: Accidental

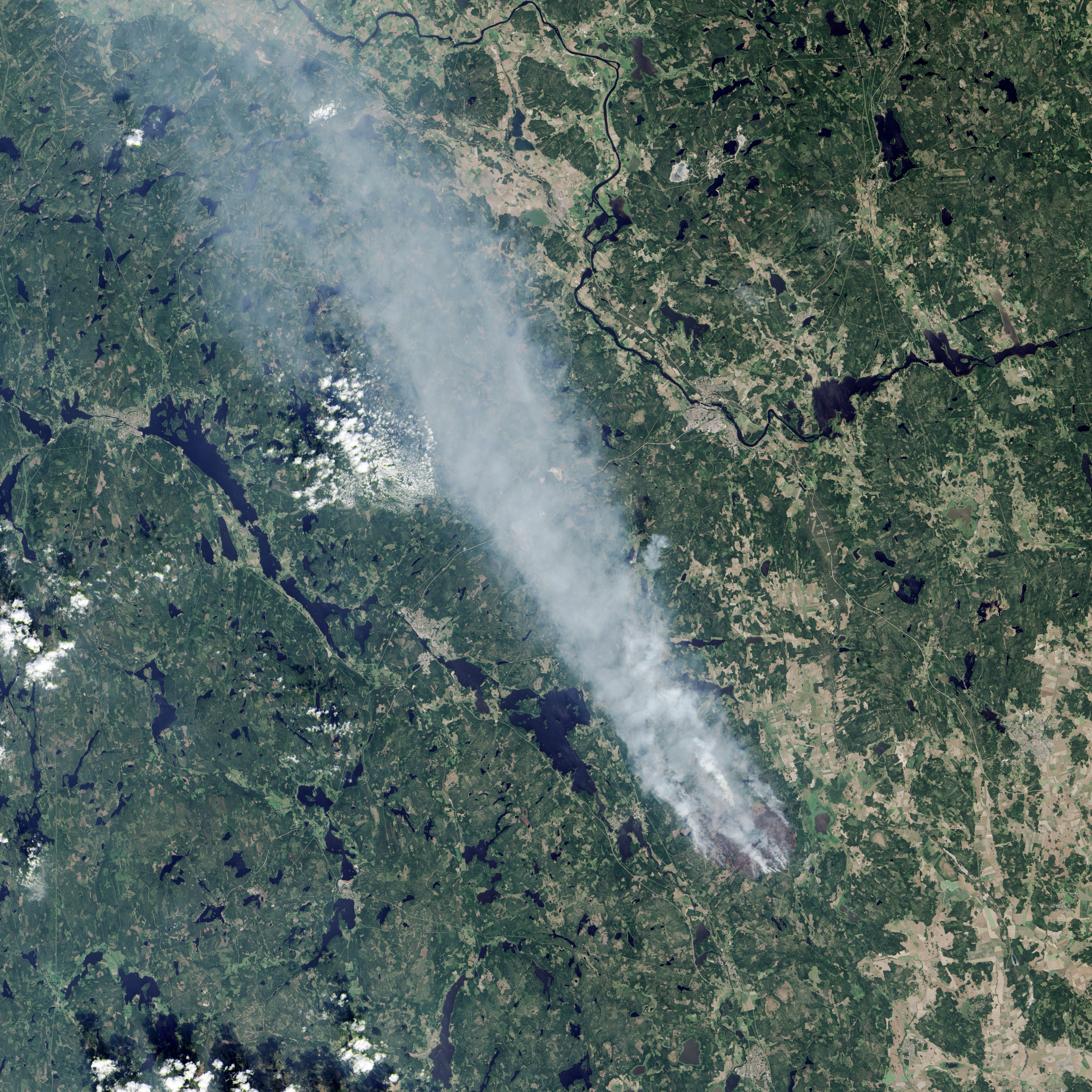
NASA Earth Observatory photo. August 4, 2014.

The 2014 Västmanland wildfire was a wildfire that broke out on the afternoon of 31 July 2014 on the border between Sala Municipality and Surahammar Municipality in Västmanland, Sweden. It is Sweden's largest wildfire in 40 years. After an EU appeal, Italy and France provided firefighting aircraft.

On 4 August 2014, the evacuation of residents began in Gammelby alongside Route 668 east of Lake Virsbo, Västervåla and Ängelsberg. As of 5 August 2014, over one thousand people were forced to evacuate their homes, and the town of Norberg, with about 4500 residents, was being considered for evacuation. One person was confirmed killed by the fire near Stabäck. The fire was declared a national emergency. It encompassed over 15,000 hectares and was located northwest of Sala. The Swedish Armed Forces were mobilized, with about 100 personnel providing support to the firefighters as of 7 August. Authorities requested that volunteer firefighters stay away after one group of them became trapped and had to be rescued.

The wildfire threatened the UNESCO World Heritage Site Engelsberg Ironworks. The owners of the Ironworks, Nordstjernan, rented two helicopters of their own to water the area close to the site.

The Swedish police started a preliminary investigation of the cause of the fire, to see if it was caused by criminal negligence. According to local media, a driver of a ground-preparation vehicle stated that the fire started in his vehicle and that no fire watch was posted despite a very high risk of fire. Although the 2014 Swedish heat wave did not cause the fire, the exceptionally hot and dry conditions of the summer of 2014 enabled the fire to spread and intensify.

== See also ==
- List of wildfires
