= Cyclone Christina =

2014 European windstorm

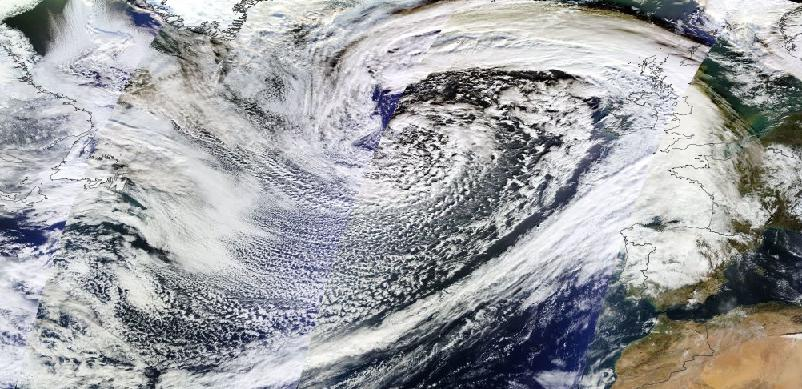
- Christina over the Atlantic on 5 January 2014

Meteorological history
- Formed: January 3, 2014
- Dissipated: January 10, 2014

European windstorm
- Lowest pressure: 934 mb (27.6 inHg)

Overall effects
- Fatalities: 3
- Damage: €375 million
- Areas affected: Ireland, United Kingdom, France, Channel Islands, Isle of Man, Spain, Portugal, Morocco

Cyclone Christina was a European windstorm which caused three fatalities and €375 million in damage across western Europe in early January 2014, making landfall several days after Cyclone Anne. Forming out of a powerful nor'easter off the coast of North America, Christina reached a peak intensity of 934 mb (27.6 inHg) as it crossed western Europe.

The storm was more commonly referred to as Christine in Ireland. It was named Christina by the Free University Berlin on 3 January.

== Meteorological synopsis ==
Christina began as an area of low pressure responsible for a winter storm in the United States and Canada, unofficially named Hercules by The Weather Channel, a name which was also used in several European newspapers. The low explosively deepened before moving out over the Atlantic. A Met Office spokeswoman said the storm developing in the Atlantic was "loosely connected to the weather system that caused the U.S. winter storm", explaining that as it moved over the Atlantic it would pick up moisture and warmth from the ocean which would change its character.

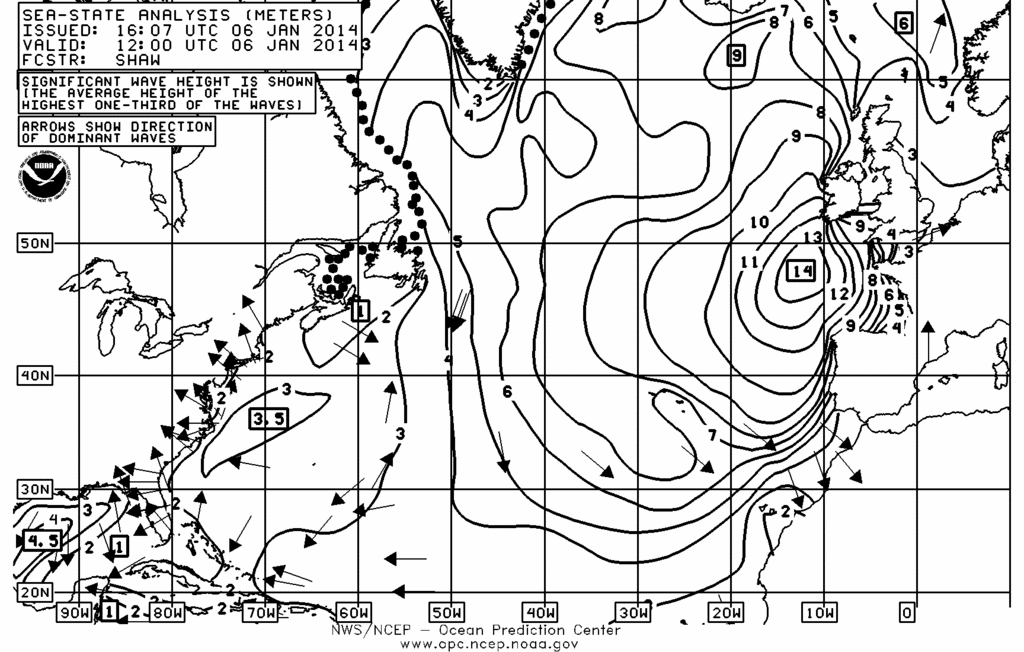
Significant wave height North Atlantic 6 January 2014

== Impact ==
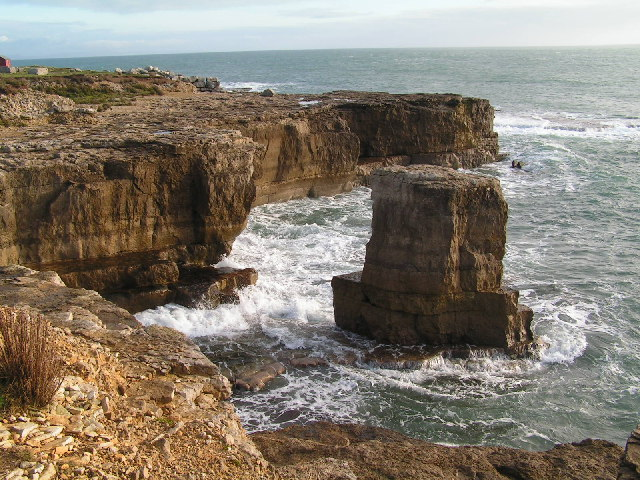
Pom Pom Rock in 2005.
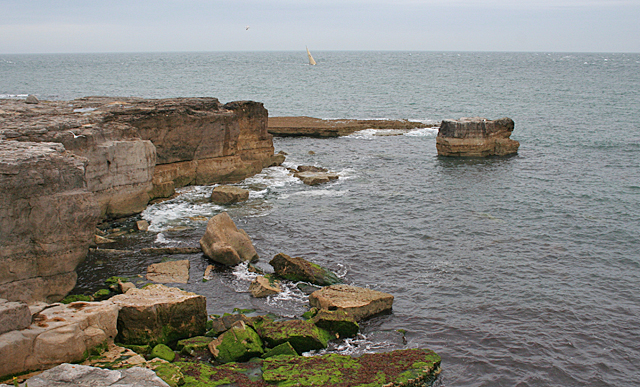

Pom Pom Rock, a sea stack off the coast of Isle of Portland, in the English Channel collapsed during the storm.

=== Ireland ===
Christina affected Ireland on the 175th anniversary of one of the worst storms of the last 500 years in the country, the Night of the Big Wind of 6 January 1839. The Irish Marine Institute recorded waves nearly 12 metres on 6 January on its M6 buoy on the Porcupine Bank off the north-west of Ireland, and off the coast of Belmullet, Co. Mayo.

Galway city saw coastal flooding along the coast at Spanish Arch, the Fishmarket and Docks, with Grattan Road closed. Salthill Promenade and Seapoint in the city were closed. In Galway the River Corrib burst its banks near to Spanish Arch, but saw no major flooding. Junior Minister Brian Hayes said Galway's application for flood relief funding from the Office of Public Works would be dealt with rapidly.

A shipwreck featured in the opening credits of the comedy series Father Ted, the MV Plassey ship on Inis Oirr was damaged and moved for the first time since 1991 by the storm. The smallest of the Aran islands also bore the brunt of the storm, where the high seas pounded the coast and the lighthouse was damaged.

In County Clare "Christina" caused widespread damage, not due to high winds but due to high swells. Damage was reported from Loop Head, while the seafront in Lahinch and Liscannor was again severely hit. Road flooding due to swells was reported from Clahane, Doolin, Ballyvaughan, Doonbeg, Kilbaha and Carrigaholt.

At Rhosbeigh County Kerry the storm unearthed and moved the shipwreck of the Schooner Sunbeam buried since 1903, which was scheduled to be reburied by the National Monuments Service.

== Aftermath ==
Initial estimates of the costs of repair in Ireland estimated that the total bill to local authorities could exceed €100m.

Clare County Council, thought to be the worst hit area, estimated costs for remedial work will cost €23.7 million. The county manager told the council in an emergency meeting the bill was beyond the financial capability of the council. Initial assessments by Kerry County Council estimated damage to infrastructure at €3.5 million, with an additional €16 million cost for coastal protection works. Estimates from Waterford were at €7 million, Cork County €5 million, Dublin City Council €100,000 and Galway City €1.5million (in the city only). Galway County, Donegal, Mayo, Sligo and Wexford were yet to release initial cost assessments.

The combined costs to Clare and Kerry councils was estimated at €46 million, with €5.8 million costs in the village of Lahinch alone.
