= 2014 Assiniboine River flood =

2014 disaster in Manitoba and Saskatchewan, Canada

- Date: June 2014 –
- Location: Manitoba, Saskatchewan
- Property damage: >$1 billion

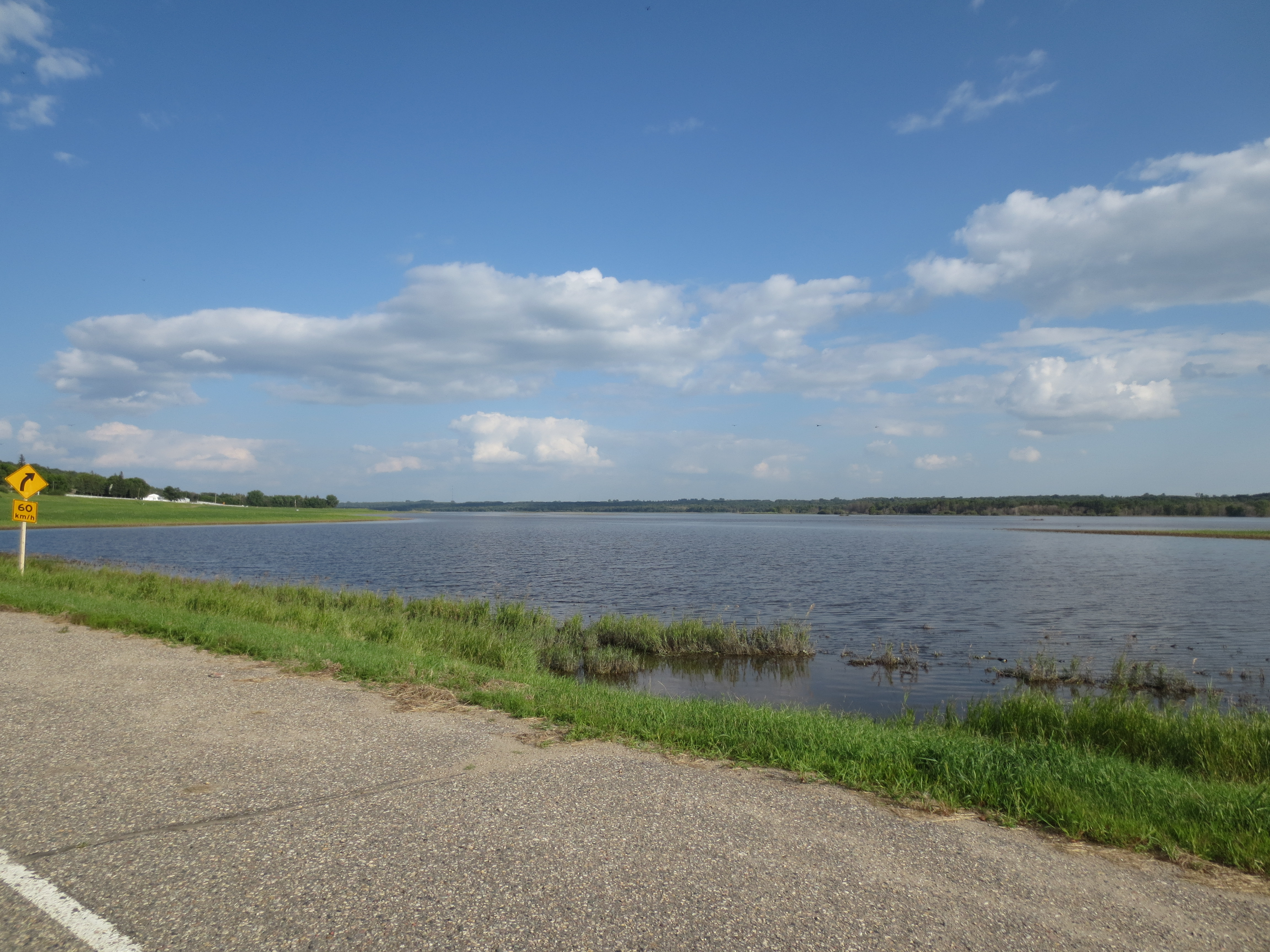
Flooding in the Grand Valley near Brandon

The 2014 Assiniboine River flood was caused by above average precipitation in western Manitoba and Saskatchewan. Unlike most prior floods, this flood was not due to spring runoff, but rather significant rainfall. Flooding and high water involved both the main stem of the Assiniboine River and many of its tributaries including the Qu'Appelle River and the Souris River. The flood came just 3 years after the 2011 Assiniboine River Flood which was considered a 1 in 300 year event. Peak flows along the river for the first crest were generally slightly less than in 2011. However, the second peak on the river has exceeded 2011 levels starting near St. Lazare, Manitoba up to Brandon, Manitoba so far.

== Early signs ==
After a generally unremarkable spring in the Assiniboine River watershed with some minor flooding, a series of significant rainfall events occurred in June and early July with the most significant event occurring in Eastern Saskatchewan and Western Manitoba over the Canada Day long weekend.

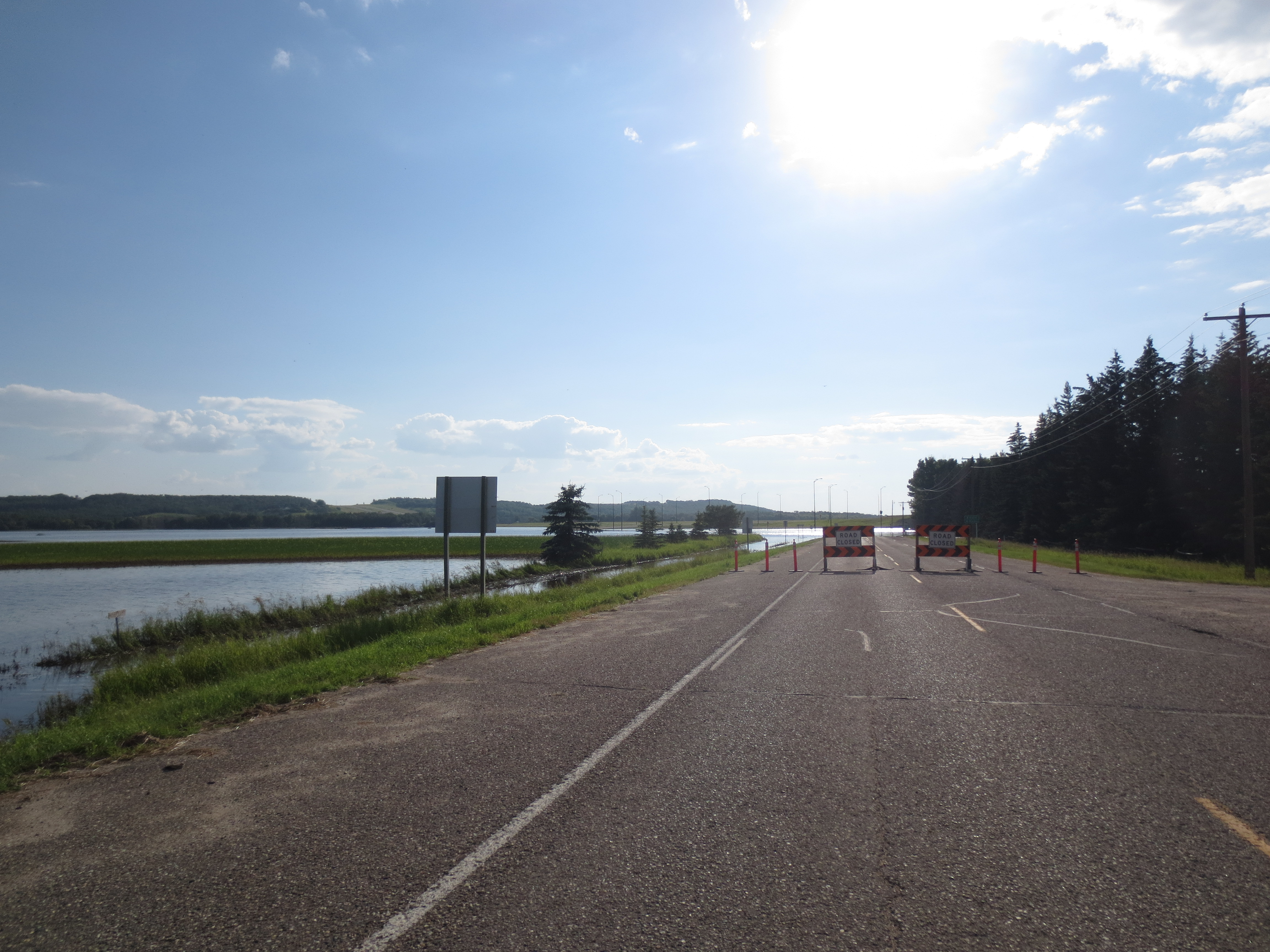
The Grand Valley near Brandon flooding due to high waters on the Assiniboine River

== Preparations ==
After multiple states of local states of emergencies were declared in Manitoba, the Province of Manitoba declared a provincial state of emergency on July 4, and Premier Greg Selinger contacted Prime Minister Stephen Harper to request military assistance in the flood fight. Troops from CFB Shilo were deployed to help sandbag vulnerable properties, shore up dikes, and monitor dikes for any breaches along the lower Assiniboine River between Portage la Prairie and Winnipeg. Dikes were reinforced and built up along the Portage Diversion as well in order for the channel to run above design capacity. Preparations were also made at the Hoop and Holler bend on Provincial Road 331 in the event a controlled breach of the lower Assiniboine River was needed to handle excess flows beyond the capacity of flood control measures.

== Flooding ==
The first crest reached Brandon on July 6 with flows of 34,330 cfs below the levels of 2011 when the river crested at 36,700 cfs. When the crest reached the Portage Reservoir on July 9, flows reached 52,100 cfs with approximately 34,100 cfs directed toward Lake Manitoba through the Portage Diversion and 18,000 cfs toward Winnipeg. This was again lower than in 2011 when the river crested at the Portage Reservoir with flows of 53,100 cfs.

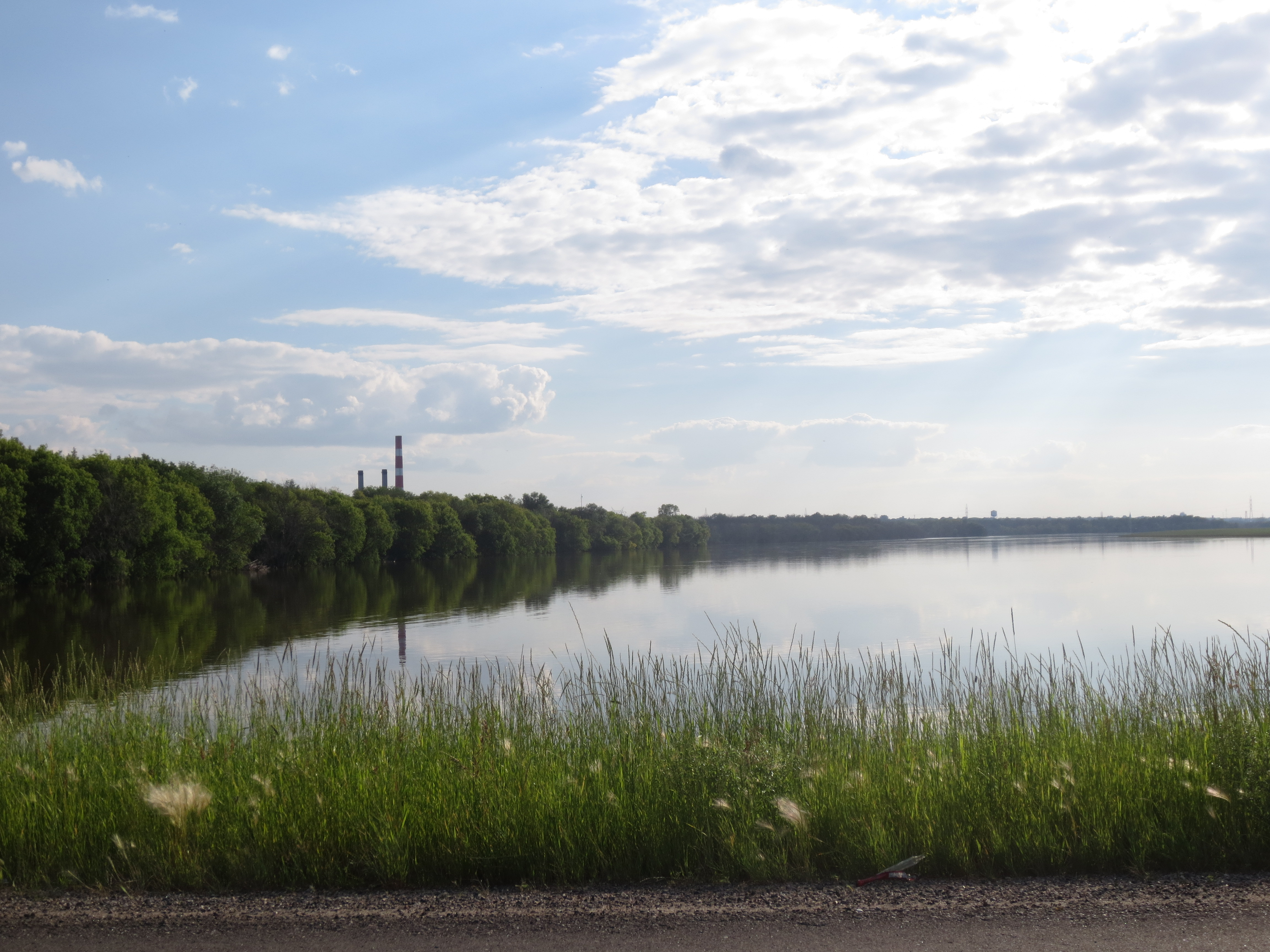
Flooding in Brandon during the 2014 Assiniboine River Flood

The second crest reached St. Lazare, Manitoba on July 9 and crested at 1,290.78 feet above sea level (ASL), which was approximately 0.7 ft. higher than the previous record crest of 2011. Nine homes in the St. Lazare area outside the community ring dike were damaged. On July 12, the second crest reached Brandon and peak flows were measured at 38,870 cfs, which was higher than 2011 levels. Record flows were experienced upstream of the confluence of the Souris and Assiniboine Rivers but not downstream of this point, as the Souris River was not experiencing significant enough flows. As a result the second crest at the Portage Reservoir was slightly lower than the first one coming in at 51,480 cfs.

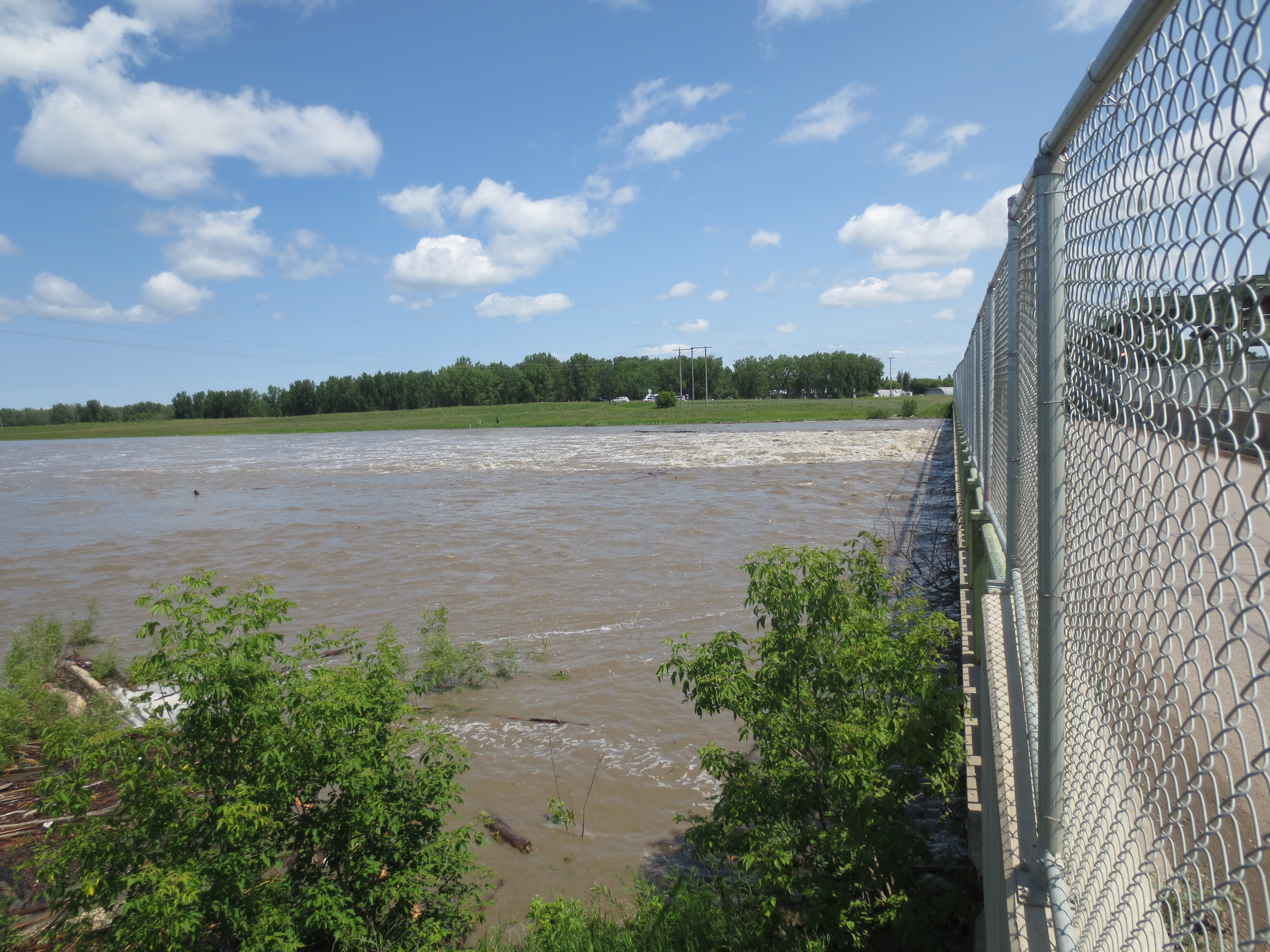
Portage Diversion in operation during the 2014 Assiniboine River Flood

== Effects on Lake Manitoba ==
With excess spring flows on the Assiniboine River directed towards Lake Manitoba through use of the Portage Diversion, lake levels were above the desirable range of the lake of 810.0 to 812.0 feet above sea level (ASL) and even the upper limit of 813 feet ASL prior to the summer flood. Continued use of the Portage Diversion occurred after it was re-opened to help mitigate against flooding, during which flows of over 34,000 cfs were directed towards the lake, well above the original designed channel capacity of the Portage Diversion of 25,000 cfs. During the 2011 as well as the 2014 floods, work was done on the Portage Diversion to allow it to convey the higher volumes experienced. The result of this was that the water level of Lake Manitoba peaked at 814.6 feet putting residents on the lake at risk of flooding and damage from wind events.

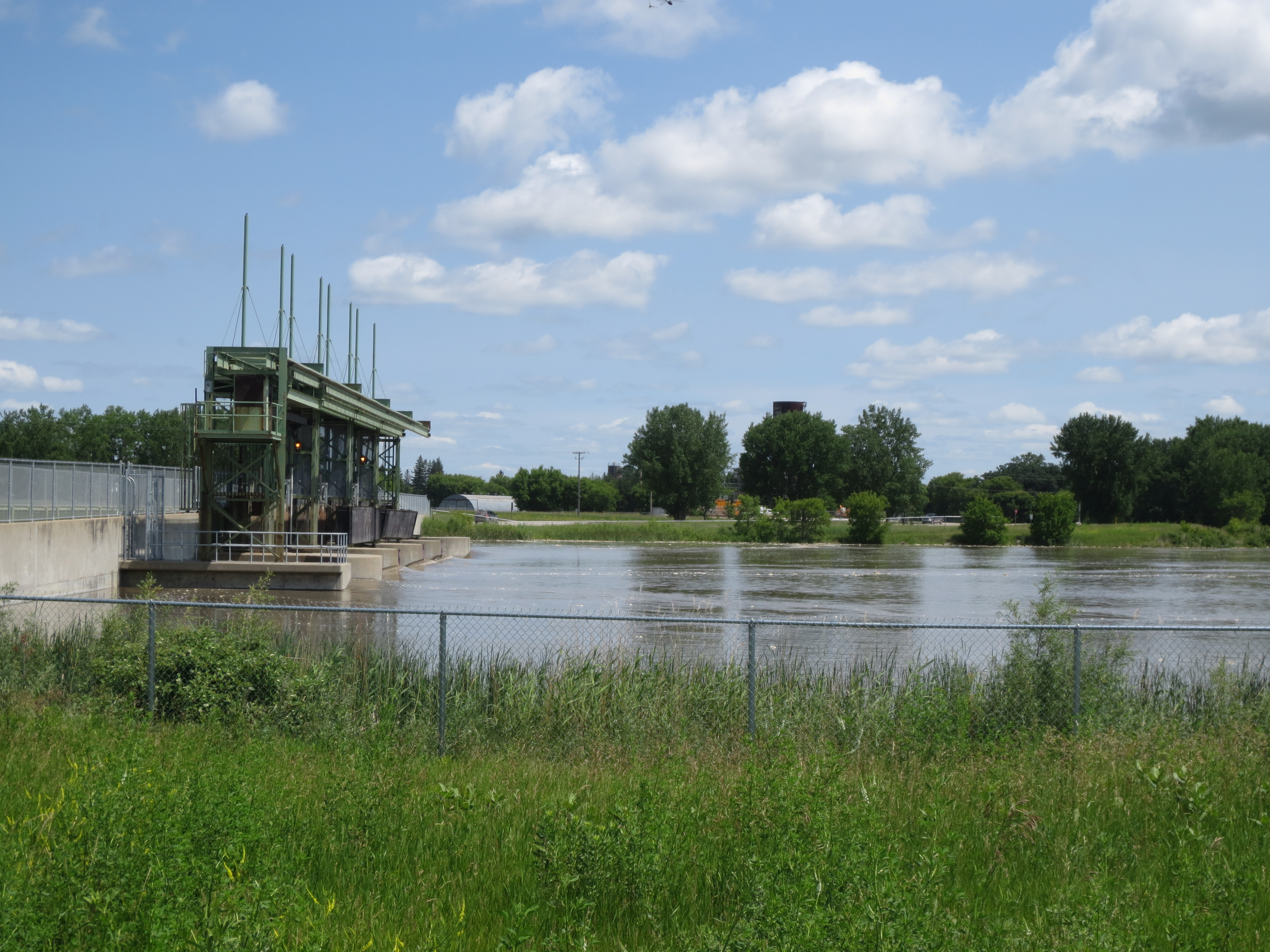
Portage Diversion in operation during the 2014 Assiniboine River Flood

== Aftermath and damages ==
Preliminary estimates of damages directly from the flooding are estimated at $1 billion for the agricultural sector alone with further damages yet to be assessed for property owners and other businesses. This does not include economic losses related to economic spin-offs which are estimated to total a $3 billion loss to the economy of Manitoba. Future damages may occur on Lake Manitoba as a result of the continued use of the Portage Diversion redirecting flood waters from the Assiniboine River until the lower reach of the river can handle flows without flooding. Without the use of the Portage Diversion catastrophic damages would occur downstream. However, even with the restriction of flows on the lower Assiniboine River to about 18,000 cfs property damage occurred. Numerous properties along the Assiniboine River east of Portage la Prairie suffered significant property damage as well as bank erosion and loss of mature stands of trees. Water continues to remain over the banks in the same region well into August including the KOA campground in St Francois Xavier which remained under water for approximately 4 weeks.
