= Prix Michel-Sarrazin =

Canadian Scientific Award

The Prix Michel-Sarrazin is awarded annually in the Canadian province of Quebec by the Club de Recherches Clinique du Québec to a celebrated Québécois scientist who, by their dynamism and productivity, have contributed in an important way to the advancement of research biomedical. It is named in honour of Michel Sarrazin (1659–1734) who was the first Canadian scientist.

== Winners ==
Source: CRCQ

- 1977 – Michel Chrétien
- 1978 – Jean-Marie Delage
- 1979 – Guy Lemieux
- 1980 – Charles Philippe Leblond
- 1981 – René Simard
- 1982 – Louis Poirier
- 1983 – André Barbeau
- 1984 – Jacques R. Ducharme
- 1985 – André Lanthier
- 1986 – Claude Fortier
- 1987 – Domenico Regoli
- 1988 – Charles Scriver
- 1989 – Serge Carrière
- 1990 – Fernand Labrie
- 1991 – Étienne LeBel
- 1992 – Réginald Nadeau
- 1993 – Claude C. Roy
- 1994 – Jacques Leblanc
- 1995 – Clarke Fraser
- 1996 – Jacques Genest
- 1997 – Samuel Solomon
- 1998 – Jacques de Champlain
- 1999 – Claude Laberge
- 2000 – Martial G. Bourassa
- 2001 – Jean Davignon
- 2002 – Brenda Milner
- 2003 – Peter T. Macklem
- 2004 – Francis Glorieux
- 2005 – Pavel Hamet
- 2006 – Marek Rola-Pleszczynski
- 2007 – Rémi Quirion
- 2008 – Serge Rossignol
- 2009 – Jacques P. Tremblay
- 2010 – Michel Bouvier
- 2011 – Stanley Nattel
- 2012 – Michel L. Tremblay
- 2013 – Vassilios Papadopoulos
- 2014 – Roger Lecomte
- 2015 – Claude Perreault
- 2016 – Michel G. Bergeron
- 2017 – Anne-Marie Mes-Masson
- 2018 – William D. Fraser

== See also ==
- List of biochemistry awards
- List of biomedical science awards
- List of awards named after people
