= Marcel-Piché Prize =

The Marcel-Piché Prize (French language: prix Marcel-Piché) is awarded to a researcher at the Institut de recherches cliniques de Montréal (IRCM) "in recognition of the quality of [biomedical] research and in recognition of the contribution to the growth and outreach of the Institute." The prize is named after Marcel Piché, a Montreal lawyer involved with the IRCM.

== Recipients ==
Source: IRCM

- 1976 - Wojciech Nowaczynski
- 1977 - Roger Boucher
- 1978 - Michel Chrétien
- 1979 - André Barbeau
- 1980 - Otto Kuchel
- 1981 - Jean Davignon
- 1982 - Shri V. Pande
- 1983 - Nabil Seidah
- 1984 - Marc Cantin
- 1985 - Paul Jolicoeur
- 1986 - Louis Yves Marcel
- 1987 - Peter W. Schiller
- 1988 - Ram Sairam
- 1989 - Pavel Hamet
- 1990 - David J. Roy
- 1991 - Ernesto Luis Schiffrin
- 1992 - Jacques Drouin
- 1993 - Rafick-Pierre Sékaly
- 1994 - Mona Nemer
- 1995 - Louis-Gilles Durand
- 1996 - Trang Hoang
- 1997 - Vincent F. Castellucci
- 1998 - Jacques Genest
- 2000 - Guy Sauvageau
- 2002 - André Veillette
- 2004 - Yvan Guindon
- 2006 - Pierre Larochelle
- 2008 - Timothy L. Reude
- 2012 - Éric A. Cohen
- 2014 - Jean-François Côté
- 2017 - Frédéric Charron

== See also ==
- List of medicine awards
- List of prizes named after people
