= Biological pacemaker =

Specialized cells used to improve heart regulation

A biological pacemaker is one or more types of cellular components that, when "implanted or injected into certain regions of the heart," produce specific electrical stimuli that mimic that of the body's natural pacemaker cells. Biological pacemakers are indicated for issues such as heart block, slow heart rate, and asynchronous heart ventricle contractions.

The biological pacemaker is intended as an alternative to the artificial cardiac pacemaker that has been in human use since the late 1950s. Despite their success, several limitations and problems with artificial pacemakers have emerged during the past decades such as electrode fracture or damage to insulation, infection, re-operations for battery exchange, and venous thrombosis. The need for an alternative is most obvious in children, including premature newborn babies, where size mismatch and the fact that pacemaker leads do not grow with children are a problem. A more biological approach has been taken in order to mitigate many of these issues. However, the implanted biological pacemaker cells still typically need to be supplemented with an artificial pacemaker while the cells form the necessary electrical connections with cardiac tissue.

== History ==
The first successful experiment with biological pacemakers was carried out by Arjang Ruhparwar 's group at Hannover Medical School in Germany using transplanted fetal heart muscle cells. The process was first introduced at the scientific sessions of the American Heart Association in Anaheim in 2001, and the results were published in 2002. A few months later, Eduardo Marbán's group from Johns Hopkins University published the first successful gene-therapeutic approach towards the generation of pacemaking activity in otherwise non-pacemaking adult cardiomyocytes using a guinea pig model. The investigators postulated latent pacemaker capability in normal heart muscle cells. This potential ability is suppressed by the inward-rectifier potassium current Ik1 encoded by the gene Kir2 which is not expressed in pacemaker cells. By specific inhibition of Ik1 below a certain level, spontaneous activity of cardiomyocytes was observed with resemblance to the action potential pattern of genuine pacemaker cells.

Meanwhile, other genes and cells have been discovered, including heart muscle cells derived from embryonic stem cells, "HCN" genes which encode the wild type pacemaker current I(f). Michael Rosen's group demonstrated that transplantation of HCN2-transfected human mesenchymal stem cells (hMSCs) leads to expression of functional HCN2 channels in vitro and in vivo, mimicking overexpression of HCN2 genes in cardiac myocytes. In 2010, Ruhparwar's group again demonstrated a type of biological pacemaker, this time showing that by injection of the "Adenylate Cyclase" gene into the heart muscle a biological cardiac pacemaker can be created.

In 2014, a gene called TBX18 has been non-invasively applied to speed up heart rates caused by heart block. More recent studies in 2015, has been experimented optogenetic approach in the rats heart, where a light sensitive transgene (Channelrhodopsin-2) injected to several sites of rat's ventricular, which, furthermore, can simultaneously stimulate the injection sites by a blue light irradiation.
