= Prix Marie-Victorin =

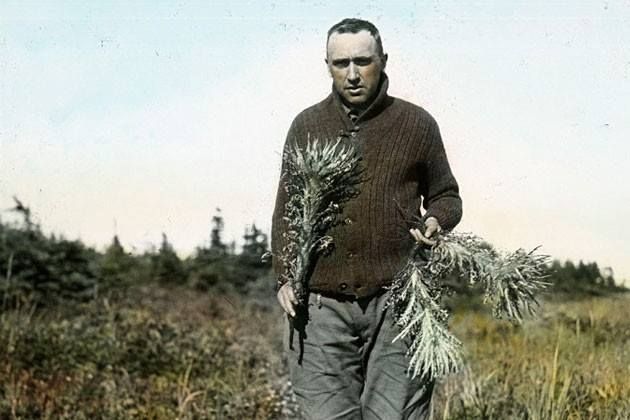
Brother Marie-Victorin in 1928

The Prix Marie-Victorin (French pronunciation: [pʁi maʁi viktɔʁɛ̃]) is an award by the Government of Quebec that is part of the Prix du Québec, which "goes to researchers in the pure and applied sciences whose work lies in fields outside biomedicine. These fields include the natural and physical sciences, engineering, and technology, and the agricultural sciences". It is named in honour of Brother Marie-Victorin.

== Winners ==
- 1977 - Jacques Genest
- 1978 - Bernard Belleau
- 1979 - Armand Frappier
- 1980 - Claude Fortier
- 1981 - René Pomerleau
- 1982 - Camille Sandorfy
- 1983 - Pierre Dansereau
- 1984 - William Henry Gauvin
- 1985 - André Barbeau
- 1986 - Stanley Mason
- 1987 - Pierre Deslongchamps
- 1988 - Germain Brisson
- 1989 - Jacques Leblanc
- 1990 - Leo Yaffe
- 1991 - Mircea Steriade
- 1992 - Charles Philippe Leblond
- 1993 - Not awarded
- 1994 - Ronald Melzack
- 1995 - John J. Jonas
- 1996 - Stephen Hanessian
- 1997 - Louis Legendre
- 1998 - Ashok Vijh
- 1999 - Gilles Fontaine
- 2000 - Gilles Brassard
- 2001 - Robert Prud'homme
- 2002 - Claude Hillaire-Marcel
- 2003 - Louis Taillefer
- 2004 - Graham Bell
- 2005 - Pierre Legendre
- 2006 - Lawrence Mysak
- 2007 - Yves Bergeron
- 2008 - André Charette
- 2009 - Victoria Kaspi
- 2010 - André D. Bandrauk
- 2011 - Serge Payette
- 2012 - Louis Bernatchez
- 2013 - James Wuest
- 2014 - Ke Wu
- 2015 - Pierre Demers
- 2016 - Mario Leclerc
- 2017 - Yoshua Bengio
- 2018 - Gilbert Laporte
- 2019 - Sylvain Moineau
- 2020 - Anne de Vernal
- 2021 - Federico Rosei
- 2022 - Roberto Morandotti
- 2023 - Christian Messier
- 2024 - René Doyon

== See also ==
- List of general science and technology awards
