= Prix Wilder-Penfield =

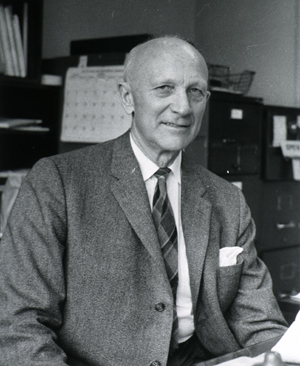
Wilder Penfield, 1958

The Prix Wilder-Penfield is an award by the government of Quebec that is part of the Prix du Québec, which "goes to scientists whose research aims fall within the field of biomedicine. These fields include the medical sciences, the natural sciences, and engineering". It is named in honour of Wilder Penfield.

== Winners ==
- 1993 - Brenda Milner
- 1994 - Yves Lamarre
- 1994 - Albert J. Aguayo
- 1995 - Charles R. Scriver
- 1996 - Jacques de Champlain
- 1997 - Krešimir Krnjević
- 1998 - Theodore L. Sourkes
- 1999 - Clarke Fraser
- 2000 - Jean Davignon
- 2001 - Pavel Hamet
- 2002 - André Parent
- 2003 - Frederick Andermann
- 2004 - Rémi Quirion
- 2005 - Michel G. Bergeron
- 2006 - George Karpati
- 2007 - Jacques Montplaisir
- 2008 - Philippe Gros
- 2009 - Otto Kuchel
- 2010 - Mark A. Wainberg
- 2011 - Nabil G. Seidah
- 2012 - Guy Rouleau
- 2013 - Phil Gold
- 2014 - Michael Meaney
- 2015 - Michel Chrétien
- 2016 - Alan Evans
- 2017 - Michel Bouvier
- 2018 - Nahum Sonenberg
- 2019 - Stanley Nattel
- 2020 - William Foulkes
- 2021 - Michel L. Tremblay
- 2022 - Yves De Koninck
- 2023 - Jacques Simard
- 2024 - Anne-Marie Mes-Masson

== See also ==
- List of biochemistry awards
- List of medicine awards
- List of prizes named after people
