= Jeffery D. Molkentin =

American molecular biologist

Jeffery Daniel Molkentin
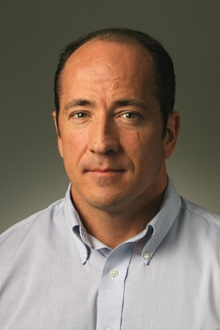
- Born: January 15, 1967 (age 59); Milwaukee, Wisconsin, U.S.
- Education: Marquette University
- Scientific career
- Fields: Molecular biology

Jeffery Daniel Molkentin (born January 15, 1967, in Milwaukee, Wisconsin) is an American molecular biologist. He is the director of Molecular Cardiovascular Biology for Cincinnati Children's hospital where he is also co-director of their Heart Institute. Molkentin holds a professorship at the University of Cincinnati's Department of Pediatrics.

== Biography ==
Molkentin was born and raised in Milwaukee, Wisconsin., where he attended Marquette University, receiving a B.S. in biology in 1989. He began studies to be a medical doctor at the University of Wisconsin, but switched to a research program, and received his PhD in physiology from the Medical College of Wisconsin in 1994.

Molkentin's work focuses on heart disease and muscular dystrophy, though he is involved in other types of research entailing calcium handling, ER stress signaling, cardiac hypertrophic signaling pathways, and COVID-19 disease mechanisms. One of Molkentin's most notable research achievements was his contribution to stem cell therapy in the heart and his disproving prior research about the topic.

Molkentin is among the most highly cited researchers in the world, with a Scopus h-index of 130 and a Google Scholar h-index of 156. Molkentin is ranked 170th most cited Biology and Biochemistry researcher out of 30,000 scientists in the Research.com database. His work has been published in several prestigious research journals, including "Nature", "PNAS", "Circulation Research", and "Cell".

Molkentin was a full investigator for the Howard Hughes Medical Institute (HHMI) from 2008 to 2021.

== Awards and honors ==
- 1998 Pew Scholar in the Biomedical Sciences
- 2012 AHA Basic Science Research Prize
- 2015 Lucian Award
- 2019 AHA Merit Award Winner

== Selected publications ==
- Loss of cyclophilin D reveals a critical role for mitochondrial permeability transition in cell death. Baines, C. P., Kaiser, R. A., Purcell, N. H., Blair, N. S., Osinska, H., Hambleton, M. A., Brunskill, E. W., Sayen, M. R., Gottlieb, R. A., Dorn, G. W., Robbins, J., & Molkentin, J. D. (2005). Nature, 434(7033), 658–662.
- An acute immune response underlies the benefit of cardiac stem cell therapy. Vagnozzi, RJ; Maillet, M; Sargent, MA; Khalil, H; Johansen, AK Z; Schwanekamp, JA; York, AJ; Huang, V; Nahrendorf, M; Sadayappan, S; et al. Nature. 2020; 577:405-409.
- A thrombospondin-dependent pathway for a protective ER stress response. Lynch, J. M., Maillet, M., Vanhoutte, D., Schloemer, A., Sargent, M. A., Blair, N. S., Lynch, K. A., Okada, T., Aronow, B. J., Osinska, H., Prywes, R., Lorenz, J. N., Mori, K., Lawler, J., Robbins, J., & Molkentin, J. D. (2012). Cell, 149(6), 1257–1268.
- A Tension-Based Model Distinguishes Hypertrophic versus Dilated Cardiomyopathy. Davis, J., Davis, L. C., Correll, R. N., Makarewich, C. A., Schwanekamp, J. A., Moussavi-Harami, F., Wang, D., York, A. J., Wu, H., Houser, S. R., Seidman, C. E., Seidman, J. G., Regnier, M., Metzger, J. M., Wu, J. C., & Molkentin, J. D. (2016). Cell, 165(5), 1147–1159.
- Depletion of skeletal muscle satellite cells attenuates pathology in muscular dystrophy. Boyer, J. G., Huo, J., Han, S., Havens, J. R., Prasad, V., Lin, B. L., Kass, D. A., Song, T., Sadayappan, S., Khairallah, R. J., Ward, C. W., & Molkentin, J. D. (2022). Nature communications, 13(1), 2940.
