= Maillé affair =

Quebec case concerning research participants' privacy

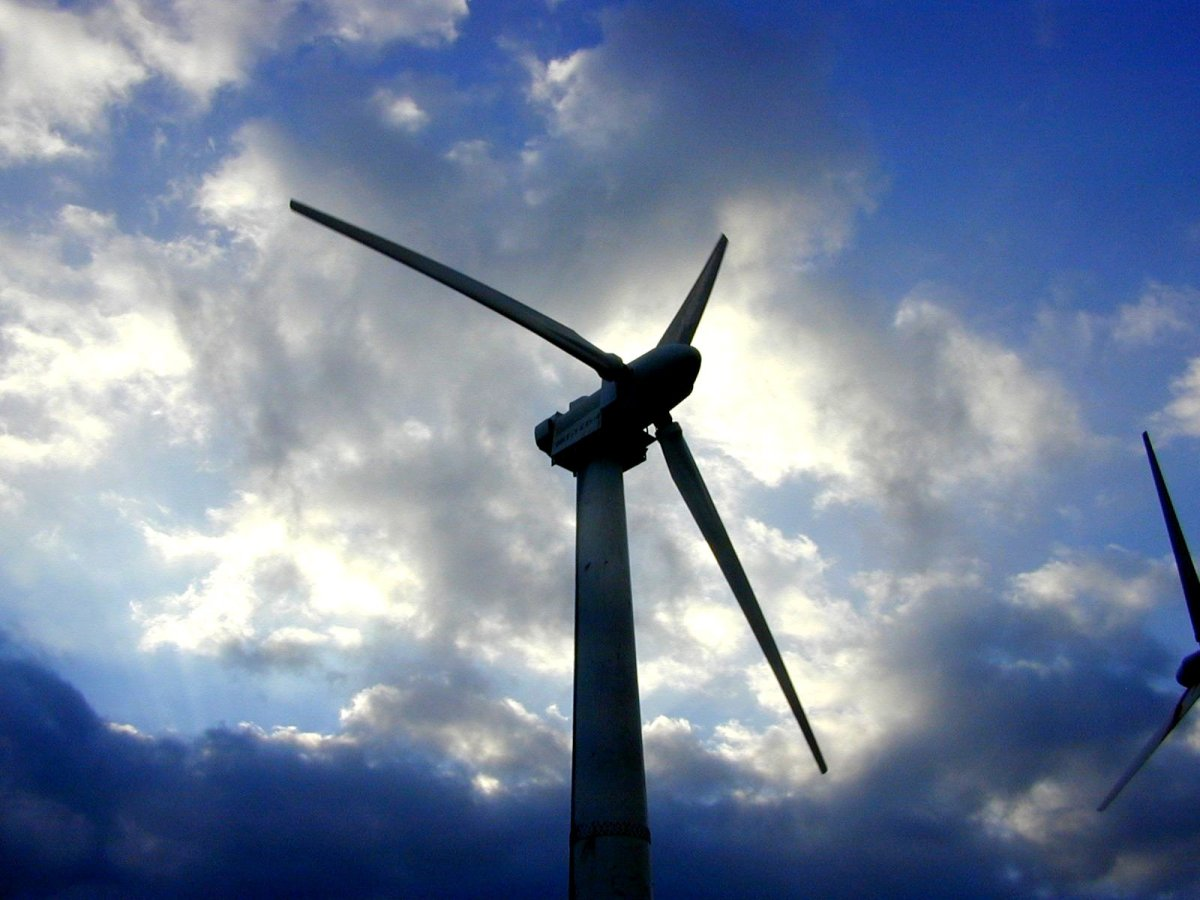
Éoliennes de l'Érable, a wind turbine company, made a request in court to obtain Dr Maillé's data.

The Maillé affair was a court case in the superior court of Quebec that threatened to force scientist Marie-Ève Maillé to give the court access to de-anonymized research data. The research concerned a conflict that arose in l'Érable regarding a wind farm. Maillé researched the impact of the conflict on social cohesion and conducted interviews with 93 residents. In 2012 a group of residents launched a class action lawsuit against the wind energy company. In 2016 the court ordered Maillé to provide the raw data from her study, which she refused on the grounds that it was her ethical duty to preserve the anonymity of her research participants. The court order was rescinded in 2017.

== Sequence of events ==
After a call for bids by Hydro-Québec in 2005, a wind farm project was presented by Enerfín for the regional county municipality (RCM) of l'Érable. In 2008, Enerfín created the subsidiary Éoliennes de l'Érable to develop the project.

The wind farm project divided the citizens of l'Érable. In the report presented to the Bureau d'audiences publiques sur l'environnement, a deterioration of the social climate was noted, based on essays submitted by citizens. Despite the tensions, the project was authorized and construction started in 201l. The wind farm became active in November 2013.

In 2010, PhD student Marie-Ève Maillé interviewed residents of the RCM of l'Érable about the diffusion of information regarding the project and the social division it created. In this context, she interviewed 93 residents, for which both she and participants signed consent forms committing to the anonymity of the resulting research data. The thesis was published in 2012.

In November 2012, some residents filed a class-action lawsuit against Éoliennes de l'Érable, complaining about inconveniences caused by the construction and operation of the wind farm. The lawsuit was accepted in 2014 by the Quebec Superior Court. In 2015, the residents involved in the class action asked Dr Maillé to act as an expert witness in the lawsuit.

Éoliennes de l'Érable requested the records of the interviews conducted by Maillé for her PhD, as well as the names of the people interviewed, in order to prepare the company's defense. In January 2016, the court ordered Maillé to provide this information to the company. In order to avoid being forced to divulge her data, Maillé withdrew as an expert witness. However, in March 2016, the court again ordered her to provide her data. In June 2016 she asked the court to review its order because it would require her to either break the confidentiality agreement she made with her research participants, or expose herself for contempt of court.

In November 2016, the University of Quebec in Montreal and other scientific organizations in Québec filed a intervention with the court supporting Maillé's request to rescind the order.

In May 2017 the court withdrew its order.

== Reactions from the scientific community ==
In August 2016, Québec's chief scientist Rémi Quirion said Maillé's research would never have been funded without the guarantee that the participants would remain anonymous. The same day, the director of the Panel on Responsible Conduct of Research, Susan V. Zimmerman emphasized that it is the researcher's duty to guarantee confidentiality on the information they obtain.

In November 2016, the Canadian Association of University Teachers said it was concerned by the order forcing Maillé to reveal the identity of the participants to her research. The day after, a letter co-signed by over 200 researchers from institutions in Québec was published. The authors of the letter wrote that the confidentiality of participants' data is an "inescapable aspect of academic research involving humans". They wrote that "the future of scientific inquiry and citizen confidence in academic research rely on this issue".

The vice-rector for research, discovery, creation and innovation of Université de Montréal reiterated the importance of respecting research participants' private lives, which is a "key element of ethics of research involving human participants". At Université du Québec à Rimouski, researchers emphasized that failing to protect information obtained in a research context may "deter citizen response to researchers requests and questions as well as restricting access to first hand data essential to a fine understanding of social realities".

== See also ==
- Deontological ethics
