= The Louis and Artur Lucian Award in Cardiovascular Diseases =

The Louis and Artur Lucian Award in Cardiovascular Diseases is a prize for cardiovascular medicine conferred by McGill University. Described as Canada's "top cardiovascular research prize", it has been awarded annually since 1978, except in 2007.

== Previous recipients ==
- 1978 Nicolae and Maya Simionescu, Bucharest and Yale University
- 1980 Solbert Permutt, Johns Hopkins University
- 1981 Gilbert Thompson, Hammersmith Hospital
- 1982 Christian Crone, University of Copenhagen
- 1983 Norman Staub, University of California
- 1984 James Ryan and Una Ryan, University of Miami
- 1985 Earl Wood, Mayo Clinic
- 1986 Dirk Brutsaert, University of Antwerp
- 1987 Daniel Steinberg, University of California
- 1988 Aubrey Taylor, University of South Alabama
- 1989 Francis Chinard, New Jersey Medical School and Ian Phillips, University of Florida
- 1990 Barbara Meyrick, Vanderbilt University
- 1991 José Jalife, State University of New York, Syracuse
- 1992 Judah Folkman, The Children's Hospital, Boston
- 1993 Arthur Brown, Baylor College of Medicine
- 1994 John B. Barlow, University of Witwatersrand, South Africa
- 1995 Andrew Somlyo and Avril Somlyo, University of Virginia, Charlottesville
- 1996 Robert Furchgott, State University of New York and Salvador Moncada, University College, London
- 1997 Russell Ross, University of Washington
- 1998 Eduardo Marbán, Johns Hopkins University
- 1999 Victor J. Dzau, Harvard Medical School
- 2000 Robert J. Lefkowitz, Duke University Medical School
- 2001 Mark C. Fishman, Harvard Medical School
- 2002 Salim Yusuf, McMaster University
- 2003 Eric N. Olson, University of Texas Southwestern Medical Center
- 2004 Roberto Bolli, University of Louisville
- 2005 Michael A. Gimbrone, Jr., Harvard Medical School
- 2006 Peter Carmeliet, University of Leuven
- 2007 not awarded
- 2008 Piero Anversa, Harvard Medical School
- 2009 Peter Libby, Harvard Medical School
- 2010 Marlene Rabinovitch, Stanford University School of Medicine
- 2011 Shaun R. Coughlin, University of California, San Francisco
- 2012 Garret A. FitzGerald, Perelman School of Medicine, University of Pennsylvania
- 2013 David Ginsburg, University of Michigan
- 2014 Jeffrey Robbins, University of Cincinnati College of Medicine
- 2015 Jeffery Molkentin, University of Cincinnati College of Medicine
- 2016 Brian K. Kobilka, Stanford University School of Medicine
- 2017 John McMurray, University of Glasgow
- 2018 Dan M. Roden, Vanderbilt School of Medicine; Nabil G. Seidah, Montreal Clinical Research Institute
- 2019 Joseph A. Hill, University of Texas Southwestern Medical Center

Source: McGill University

== See also ==
- List of medicine awards
