= Grise =

Grise is a French surname. Notable people with the surname include:

- Richard Grisé (1944), Canadian politician
- Virginia Grise (1976), American writer
- Yolande Grisé (1944), Canadian historian
