= Nabil Seidah =

Canadian scientist

Nabil Seidah CM CQ FRSC
- Born: 1949 (age 76–77); Egypt
- Education: Cairo University; Georgetown University
- Known for: Proprotein convertase, PCSK9
- Scientific career
- Fields: Biochemistry
- Institutions: Clinical Research Institute of Montreal

Nabil G. Seidah, CM OQ FRSC (born 1949) is a Canadian Québécois scientist. Born in Egypt, he was educated at Cairo University, and subsequently at Georgetown University where he obtained his Ph.D. in 1973. He emigrated to Canada and has been working at the Clinical Research Institute of Montreal (IRCM) since 1974. He is the director of the laboratory of Biochemical Neuroendocrinology. He discovered and cloned seven (PC1, PC2, PC4, PC5, PC7, SKI-1 and PCSK9) of the nine known enzymes belonging to the convertase family. During this period, he also greatly contributed to demonstrating that the proteolysis by the proprotein convertases is a wide mechanism that also concerns “non-neuropeptide” proteins such as growth factors, α-integrins, receptors, enzymes, membrane-bound transcription factors, and bacterial and viral proteins. In 2003, he discovered PCSK9 and showed that point mutations in the PCSK9 gene cause dominant familial hypercholesterolemia, likely because of a gain of function related to the ability of PCSK9 to enhance the degradation of cell surface receptors, such as the low-density lipoprotein receptor (LDLR). He has since worked on the elucidation of the functions and mechanisms of action of PCSK9 and PCSK7 both in cells and in vivo, and is developing specific PCSK9 and PCSK7 inhibitors/silencers.

== Awards ==
- 1977 - The Clarke Institute of Psychiatry Award
- 1983 - Marcel-Piché Prize
- 1991 - Made Fellow of the Royal Society of Canada
- 1994 - Manning Award of Distinction
- 1995 - Medical Research Council Distinguished Scientist Award
- 1997 - Made Officer of the Ordre national du Québec
- 1999 - Made member of the Order of Canada
- 1999 - Medal of Honor, Pharmaceutical Manufacturers Association of Canada (PMAC) Health Research Foundation
- 2001 - Winner of the McLaughlin medal
- 2001 - Winner of the Léo-Pariseau Prize
- 2003-2024 - Canada Chair Tier 1 in Precursor Proteolysis
- 2009 - Pfizer Distinguished Cardiovascular-Metabolic Research Jean-Davignon Award
- 2011 - Wilder-Penfield Prize in Biomedical Research in Québec
- 2013 - Queen Elizabeth II Diamond Jubilee Medal
- 2013 - Simon Pierre-Noël Memorial Lecture Award in Lipid Research
- 2014 - Jacques Genest Award from the Canadian Society of Endocrinology & Metabolism
- 2015 - Anne and Neil McArthur Research Award
- 2016 - CIHR Distinguished Lecturer Award in Cardiovascular Sciences
- 2018 - Grand Prix scientifique de la Fondation Lefoulon-Delalande
- 2018 - Akira Endo Award
- 2018 - Lucian Award
- 2021 - Elected member of the Canadian Academy of Health Sciences [CAHS]
