= Jacques LeBlanc =

Jacques LeBlanc may refer to:

- Jacques LeBlanc (boxer)
- Jacques LeBlanc (politician)
- Jacques Leblanc, Québécois physiologist
