= Graham Bell (biologist) =

British academic and writer (born 1949)

Graham Bell FRS FRSC
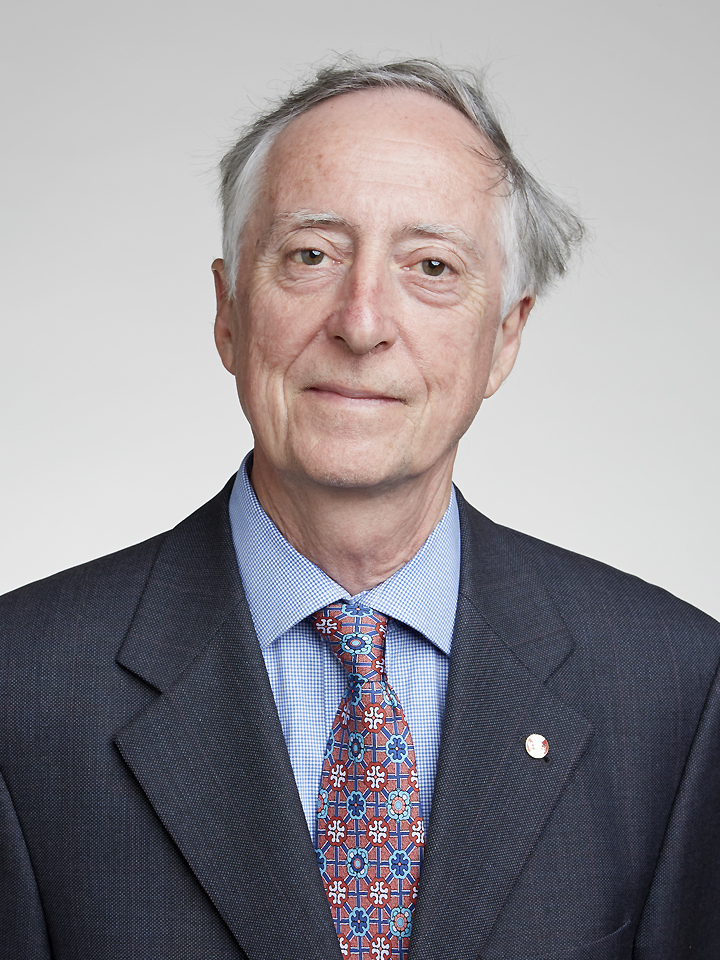
- Bell in 2016
- Born: 3 March 1949 (age 77); Leicester, England
- Education: Wyggeston Grammar School for Boys; St Peter's College, Oxford
- Spouse: Susan Rosinger (m. 1971)
- Children: 3
- Awards: Léo-Pariseau Prize (2002); Prix Marie-Victorin (2004); Flavelle Medal (2022)
- Scientific career
- Fields: Evolutionary biology
- Workplaces: McGill University; Redpath Museum
- Thesis: The life of the smooth newt (Triturus vulgaris (Linn)) (1973)

Graham Arthur Charlton Bell FRS FRSC (born 3 March 1949) is a British academic, writer, and evolutionary biologist with interests in the evolution of sexual reproduction and the maintenance of variation. He developed the "tangled bank" theory of evolutionary genetics after observing the asexual and sexual behaviour patterns of aphids as well as monogonont rotifers.

== Early life and education ==
Bell was born on 3 March 1949 in Leicester, England, to Arthur Charlton Bell and Edna May Bell (née Charlton). He was educated at Wyggeston Grammar School for Boys and St Peter's College, Oxford, where he was awarded a Bachelor of Arts degree in 1970 followed by a Doctor of Philosophy degree in animal ecology in 1973 for research on smooth newts.

== Career and research ==
Bell emigrated to Canada in 1975 where he worked as a biologist for the Alberta Civil Service until 1976. In 1976, he joined the faculty of McGill University as a temporary lecturer. He was appointed a Professor in 1989. In 1992, he was appointed Molson Chair of Genetics. He was Director of the Redpath Museum from 1995 to 2005.

He is the author of The Masterpiece of Nature which was described by Richard Dawkins as a 'beautifully written tour de force', Sex and Death in Protozoa: The History of Obsession and Selection: The Mechanism of Evolution first published in 1996 with a second edition in 2008. His other books include The Evolution of Life and The Basics of Selection.

Bell was a co-founder and founding President of the Canadian Society for Ecology and Evolution.

== Honours and awards ==
Bell was elected a fellow of the Royal Society of Canada in 1994. He was awarded the Léo-Pariseau Prize in 2002 and the Prix Marie-Victorin in 2004. He was elected President of the Royal Society of Canada in 2013, and became a fellow of the American Academy of Arts and Sciences in 2014. He was elected a fellow of the Royal Society in 2016. In 2022 he received the Flavelle Medal.

== Personal life ==
Bell married Susan Eva Rosinger in 1971. They have three sons.

== Bibliography (books) ==
- 1982 The Masterpiece of Nature: The Evolution and Genetics of Sexuality, Routledge Revivals, 2019
- 1989 Sex and Death in Protozoa: The History of Obsession, Cambridge University Press
- 1996 The Basics of Selection, Springer/Softcover reprint of the original 1st ed. 1997
- 2002 Selection: The Mechanism of Evolution /2nd Edition 2009
- 2022 Full Fathom 5000: The Expedition of the HMS Challenger and the Strange Animals It Found in the Deep Sea, Oxford University Press

Professional and academic associations
Preceded by Yolande Grisé	President of the Royal Society of Canada; 2013–2015	Succeeded by Maryse Lassonde
