= Claude Laberge =

Canadian physician-geneticist

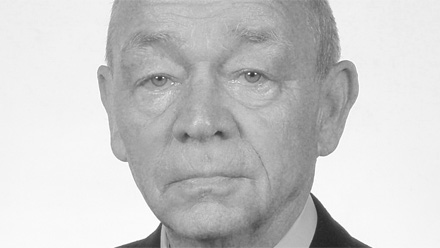
- Claude Laberge in 2011
- Born: May 27, 1938 (85 years old); Sainte-Gertrude, Nicolet, Québec
- Education: Collège des Jesuites; Université Laval; Hospital for Sick Children; Johns Hopkins University; Collège des médecins
- Employer: Université Laval

Claude Laberge (born May 27, 1938) is a physician-geneticist and a Professor Emeritus of Medicine and Pediatrics at the Faculty of Medicine at Université Laval in Québec City, Québec. He is a pioneer in the field of human genetics.

Born in Sainte-Gertrude, Nicolet, Québec, he studied at the Collège des Jésuites, received a Bachelor of Arts degree from the Séminaire de Québec (1957), an M.D. from the Université Laval (1962). He completed his residency in pediatrics at the Hospital for Sick Children in Toronto, Ontario from 1962 to 1964. In 1967, he became a member of the Fellow of the Royal College of Physicians of Canada (Pediatrics). A year later, he completed his Ph.D. in Human and Medical Genetics (1968) at Johns Hopkins University, Baltimore. He then received certification in Pediatrics (1968) and Medical Genetics (1997) from the Collège des médecins, Québec.

He joined the Université Laval as an adjunct professor in the Department of Medicine in 1969, and by 1970 was an associate professor. In 1981, he became a full professor at the Department of Medicine and subsequently of Pediatrics in 1985. He held these positions at the Université Laval until he retired in 2013.

During his career, Laberge held several positions in government and research organizations. From 1969 to 1994, he was the Chief of the Medical Genetics division at Centre hospitalier de l'Université Laval (CHUL). At the same time, he became the Research Coordinator of the CHUL Research Centre (1969–1981) and later became the Head of the Department of Medicine at the CHUL in 1975. In 1973, he created the Quebec Network of Genetic Medicine (QNGM) managing newborn screening including congenital hypothyroidism (cretinism) and held this position until it evolved into the Quebec Network of Applied Genetic Medicine in 1993. He was the Founding Member of the Garrod Association in 1982, an association which coordinated the screening and management of inherited metabolic diseases across Canada.

In 2010, Laberge, as a board member of Public Population Project in Genomics, founded CARTaGENE, a public population research biobank that holds clinical data and biological samples from more than 43,000 participants across Québec. CARTaGENE's main goal is to "accelerate research and innovation as well as support evidence-based decision making in clinical practice and public health while lowering the costs of health research". Laberge was the Scientific Director of CARTaGENE from 2000-2010 and then Senior Advisor from 2010-2013. Later in his career, he became the Public Health Medical Advisor to the Quebec Ministry of Health and Social Services from 2005-2015. Laberge continued to serve as a Scientific Consultant for the Centre of Genomics and Policy since 2012.

Between 1962 and 2015, Laberge published more than 155 journal articles and book chapters. His publications are predominantly on topics of inborn errors of metabolism, newborn screening, and the genetics of the French-Canadian population, but he has also published on the fields of genetics in medicine, bioethics applied to legal and human rights, and the social and policy aspects of genetics and genomics.

== Honours ==
In 1999, Laberge was awarded the Prix Michel-Sarrazin for his contributions to the advancement of biomedical research. In 2010, he was made a Member of the Order of Canada in recognition for "his vision and leadership" and his role as "a forerunner in the development and evolution of Quebec population genomics." In 2011, he was named an Officer of the Order of Québec in recognition for his contributions to the field of medical genetics in Québec.

Université Laval named Laberge a Professor Emeritus of Medicine and Pediatrics, in 2015. More recently he was awarded the Garrod prize (2023).

== Selected publications ==
1. Knoppers BM, & Laberge CM (1990). Genetic Screening: From Newborns to DNA Typing (No. 901). Amsterdam: Excerpta Medica; New York: Sole distributors for the USA and Canada, Elsevier Science Pub.
2. Charbonneau M, Laberge C, Scriver CR, Dussault JH and Lemieux B: The Quebec Network of Genetic Medicine. Le Réseau de Médecine Génétique du Québec. (1987) Can. J Pub. Health. 78: 79-83
3. Dussault JH, Coulombe P, Laberge C, Letarte J. Guyda H, Khoury K. Preliminary Report on a Mass Screening Program for Neonatal Hypothyroidism. J. Pediat 1975 May; 86(5):670-4.
