= Fernand Labrie =

Canadian medical researcher (1937–2019)

- Born: June 28, 1937; Laurierville, Quebec
- Died: January 16, 2019 (aged 81); Quebec City, Quebec
- Awards: Order of Canada; National Order of Quebec

Fernand Labrie, OC OQ MSRC (June 28, 1937 – January 16, 2019) was a Canadian medical researcher who specialized in endocrinological research and prostate cancer research.

== Life and career ==
Born in Laurierville, Quebec, he received a Bachelor of Arts degree in 1957 from the Séminaire de Québec. He received his Doctor of Medicine in 1962 and a Ph.D. in 1966 from Université Laval. From 1966 to 1969, he took his postdoctoral studies at the University of Cambridge and the University of Sussex.

In 1966, he joined the faculty of Université Laval as an assistant professor. In 1969 he was made an associate professor, and in 1974 he was made a full professor. In 1990, he was made the head of the Department of Physiology. In 1969, he was made the Director of the Molecular Endocrinology Research Centre. Labrie died at the age of 81 in January 2019.

== Honours ==
In 1981, he was made an Officer of the Order of Canada in recognition for being "one of the leading authorities in contemporary endocrinological research". In 1991, he was made an Officer of the National Order of Quebec. In 1990, he was awarded the Government of Quebec's Prix Michel-Sarrazin. In 1998, he was awarded the Izaak-Walton-Killam Award. In 2007, he was awarded the King Faisal International Prize.
