= Carl J. Wiggers =

American cardiology researcher (1883–1963)

A Wiggers' diagram

Carl J. Wiggers (May 28, 1883 – April 28, 1963) was a doctor and medical researcher famous for his heart and blood-pressure research. He developed the Wiggers diagram, which is commonly used in teaching of cardiovascular research.

Wiggers was born in Davenport, Iowa, to George and Margret Kuendal Wiggers, graduated from the University of Michigan with an M.D. in 1906, and attended the Institute of Physiology at the Ludwig-Maximilians-Universität München. He was an instructor of physiology at the University of Michigan (1906–1911), and assistant professor at Cornell University Medical School (1911–1918). From 1918 to 1953, he was professor and chairman of the Dept. of Physiology at Western Reserve University Medical School that became known as Case Western Reserve University School of Medicine. Wiggers achieved world recognition for developing a new method of registering heart and blood pressure, finding the effects of low oxygen pressure on circulation, discovering the effects of valve defects on the heart, studying the effects of shock, and his pioneering efforts along with Dr. Claude Beck and others in techniques of resuscitation from death in the operating room.

After retiring as professor emeritus in 1953, Wiggers joined the Frank Bunts Institute of the Cleveland Clinic Foundation, taking part in postgraduate training for student doctors and in medical and scientific seminars. Wiggers established and was the first editor of the medical journal Circulation Research and authored seven books and over 300 articles. In 1952, he received the Gold Heart Award from the American Heart Association. In 1951, he was elected to the National Academy of Sciences. In 1954, he received the Modern Medicine Award, and in 1955 the Albert Lasker Award for distinguished research in cardiovascular research.

== Personal life ==
Wiggers married Minnie E. Berry in 1907 and had two sons, Harold and Raymond.
