= Maryse Lassonde =

Canadian psychologist

Maryse Lassonde OC CQ FRSC
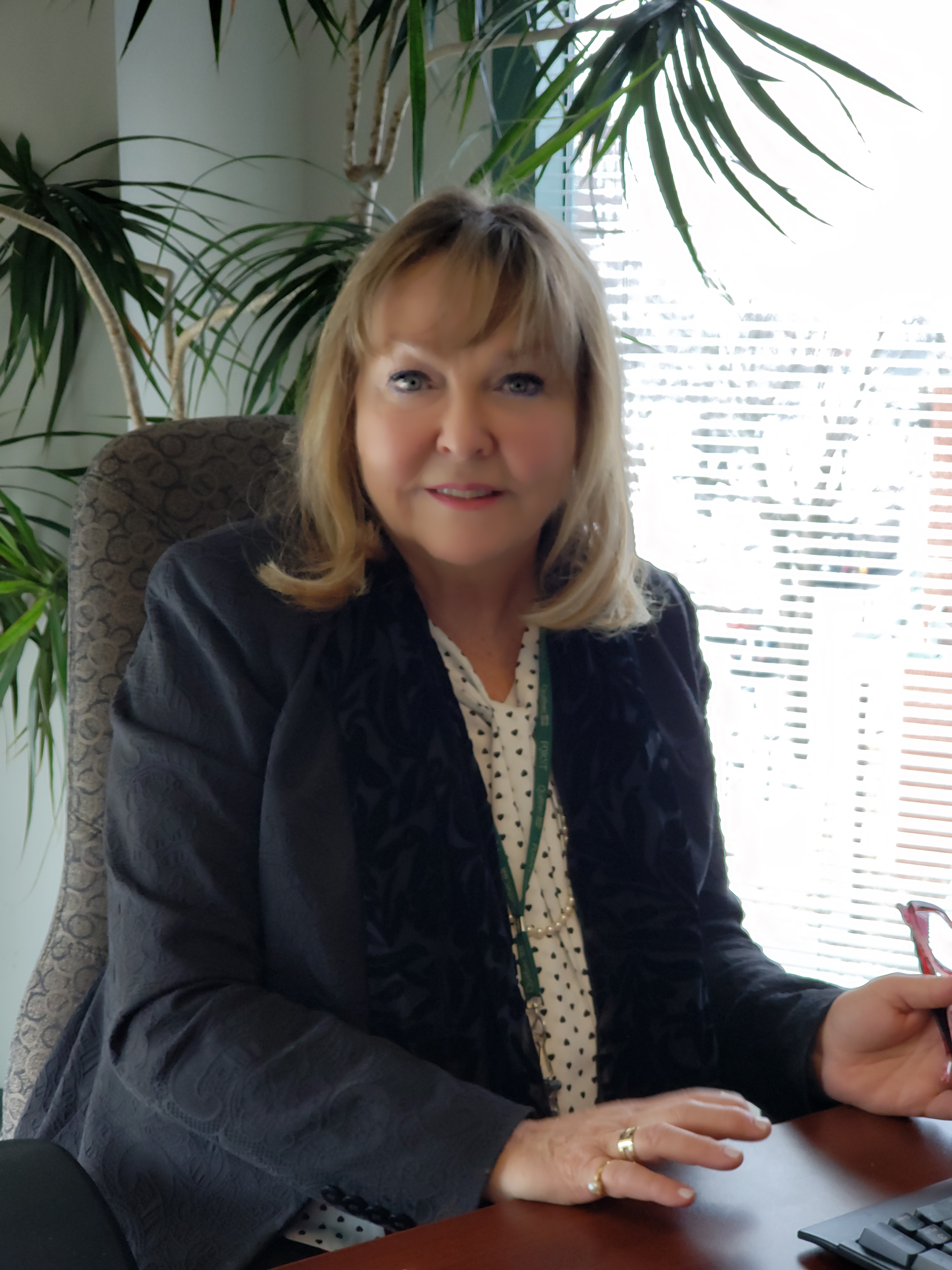
- Born: January 5, 1954 (age 72); Saint-Jean-sur-Richelieu, Quebec
- Education: Université de Montréal
- Awards: National Order of Quebec Officer of the Order of Canada (OC)
- Scientific career
- Fields: Neuropsychology

Maryse Lassonde OC CQ FRSC (born January 5, 1954) is a Canadian academic and neuropsychologist.

She holds the Canada Research Chair in Developmental Neuropsychology at the Université de Montréal and the University Hospital Center Sainte-Justine researching brain disorders.

In 1993, she became President of the French Canadian Association for the Advancement of Sciences (ACFAS). In 1999, she was made a Knight (Chevalier) of the National Order of Quebec. In 1994, she was made a Fellow of the Canadian Psychological Association and in 1997, she became a fellow of the Royal Society of Canada. She has received several awards, including the Marcel Vincent Prize (ACFAS) in 1998, the Noeil Mailloux Prize (Quebec Order of Psychologists, 2001) and the Adrien Pinard Prize (Quebec Association for Research in Psychology, SQRP, 2008). She was made an Officer of the Order of Canada (OC) in June 2012.

Professional and academic associations
| Preceded by Graham Bell | President of the Royal Society of Canada; 2015–2017 | Succeeded by Chad Gaffield |
