= James Wuest =

Canadian chemist

James D. Wuest
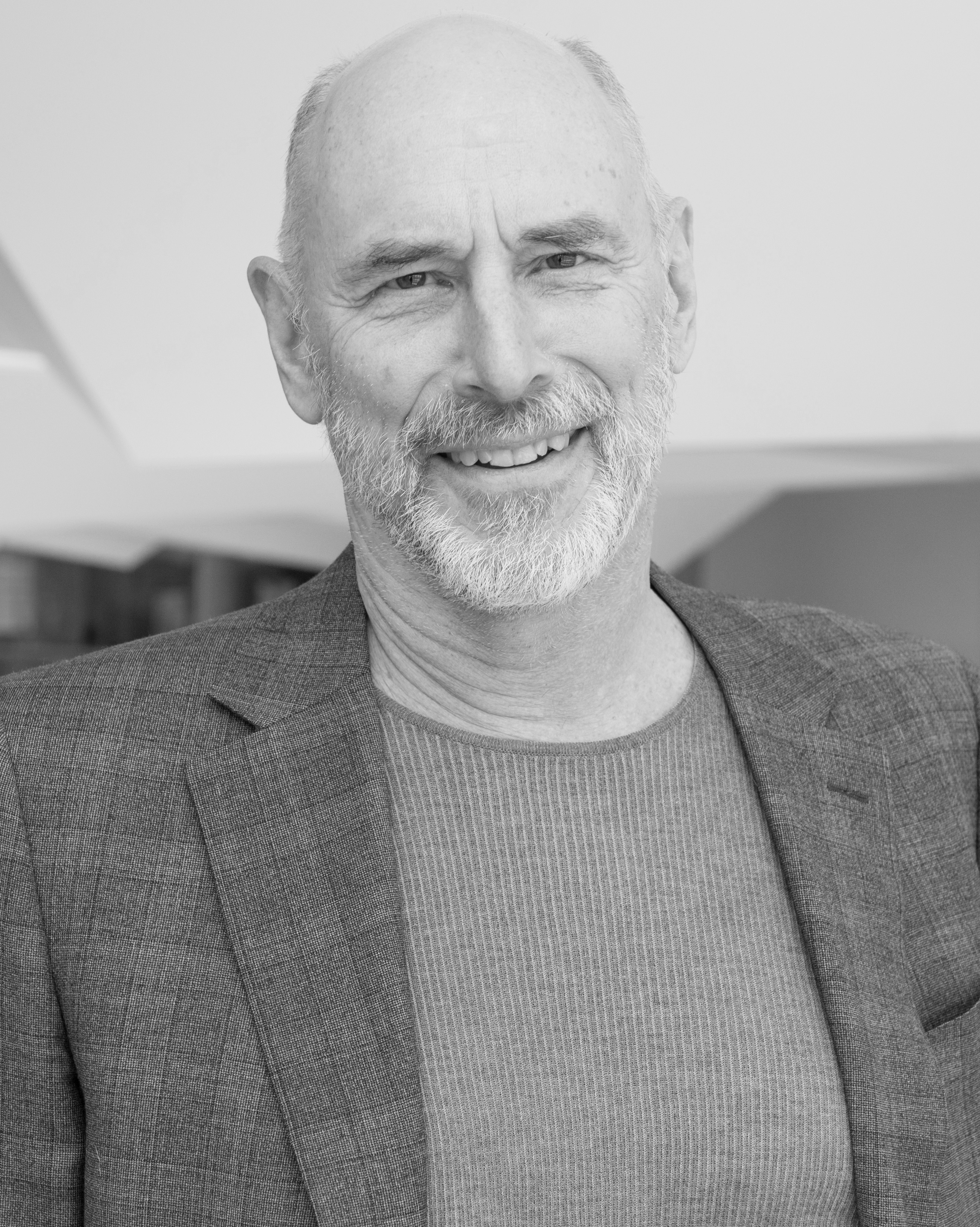
- Born: 1948; Cincinnati, Ohio
- Occupations: Chemist, materials scientist and academic
- Awards: Fellow, Royal Society of Canada (1996); Guggenheim Fellowship (1999); Arthur C. Cope Scholar Award, American Chemical Society (2005); Canada Research Chair in Molecular Materials (2001–2022)

Academic background
- Education: AB., Chemistry and Mathematics; PhD., Chemistry
- Alma mater: Cornell University; Harvard University

James D. Wuest is a Canadian chemist, materials scientist and academic. He is a professor of Chemistry at the Université de Montréal, where he teaches and leads a research group.

Wuest is most known for his contributions to the development of modular construction, using it as a method for creating molecular materials with predictable structures and properties. His research has contributed to information on molecular organization in materials and ways to control it. He is the recipient of the 1988 Merck Sharp & Dohme Award and the 2001 Alfred Bader Award in Organic Chemistry from the Canadian Society for Chemistry, the 1992 Rutherford Memorial Medal from the Royal Society of Canada, the American Chemical Society's Arthur C. Cope Scholar Award in 2005, the Prix Urgel-Archambault from the Association francophone pour le savoir in 2008, the 2013 Prix Marie-Victorin from the Government of Québec, and the 2021 Canadian Light Source T. K. Sham Award in Materials Chemistry. Additionally, he was awarded a Killam Research Fellowship in 1992 and a Guggenheim Fellowship in 1999.

Wuest is a Fellow and Life Member of the Royal Society of Canada. He was an Editor of the Canadian Journal of Chemistry from 1992 to 1997 and has been on the advisory board of Materials Chemistry Frontiers since 2019.

== Education ==
Wuest earned a bachelor's degree in Chemistry and Mathematics from Cornell University in 1969 and received his PhD in chemistry in 1973 from Harvard University, where he was a National Science Foundation Fellow and a student of Robert B. Woodward.

== Career ==
Wuest began his academic career as an assistant professor of chemistry at Harvard University from 1973 to 1979, and he became a Fellow at the Harvard Medical School in 1980. He joined the Université de Montréal as an associate professor in 1981 and has served as a professor of Chemistry since 1986. In addition, he directed the Réseau québécois de recherche en synthèse organique from 2002 to 2007. From 2007 to 2014, he served as director of the Major Central Research Facility for the Study of Nanostructured Molecular Materials and held the Canada Research Chair in Molecular Materials from 2001 to 2022. He has been a member of the Institut Courtois and its Scientific Advisory Board since 2023.

== Research ==
Wuest's research focuses on molecular materials but spans different areas of science, including organic chemistry, inorganic chemistry, physical chemistry, surface science, and computation. The work places an emphasis on molecular design, synthesis, structural analysis, and the construction of new materials by controlled molecular association.

=== Modular construction ===
Wuest is a pioneer in modular construction, a method for creating predictably ordered materials by using molecular modules that engage in well-defined associations, thereby holding their neighbors in predetermined positions.

=== Surface science ===
Wuest's research has shown how modular construction can be used in 2D to help control adsorption on surfaces. His studies have demonstrated the special value of a dual approach in which 3D molecular organization (determined by X-ray diffraction) is compared systematically with 2D organization on surfaces (revealed by scanning probe microscopy). This approach has provided insights related to molecular organization, such as how crystallization can be inhibited.

=== Molecular crystallization ===
Wuest and his research group study aspects of molecular crystallization, such as ways to inhibit crystallization and make amorphous solids, the relationship between crystallization and gelation, and the origins of polymorphism, which is the ability of compounds to have multiple crystalline forms. He has developed new ways to diversify solid forms and optimize products. Furthermore, he and his group have investigated the factors contributing to high levels of polymorphism and their work in this area has led to multiple papers and patents.

In this work, Wuest and his research group have used an approach that combines database mining, computational analysis, and experimentation as a way to understand the rules of crystallization, expand the range of known molecular behavior, and find new crystalline materials.

=== Sustainable organic-based batteries and devices ===
Wuest and his research group have used their approach to develop organic materials suitable for batteries and other devices. They have reviewed various aspects of the field and assessed the organization of components like fullerenes in optoelectronically active materials. The group has also examined the performance of organic materials in photovoltaic devices and light-emitting diodes, emphasizing sustainability and green-chemistry principles, such as choosing benign solvents for thin-layer deposition and finding ways to recycle key materials. In addition, the group has explored the use of novel redox-active organic materials in batteries, with an emphasis on compounds with unique structures and properties that can be easily synthesized from abundant renewable resources like biomass.

== Awards and honors ==
- 1988 – Merck Sharp & Dohme Award, Canadian Society for Chemistry
- 1992 – Killam Research Fellowship, National Research Council Canada
- 1992 – Rutherford Memorial Medal, Royal Society of Canada
- 1996 – Elected Fellow, Royal Society of Canada
- 1999 – Guggenheim Fellowship, John Simon Guggenheim Memorial Foundation
- 2001 – Alfred Bader Award in Organic Chemistry, Canadian Society for Chemistry
- 2005 – Arthur C. Cope Scholar Award, American Chemical Society
- 2008 – Prix Urgel-Archambault, Association francophone pour le savoir
- 2013 – Prix Marie-Victorin, Government of Québec
- 2021 – Canadian Light Source T. K. Sham Award in Materials Chemistry, Chemical Institute of Canada

== Selected articles ==
- Simard, M., Su, D., & Wuest, J. D. (1991). Use of hydrogen bonds to control molecular aggregation. Self-assembly of three-dimensional networks with large chambers. Journal of the American Chemical Society, 113(12), 4696–4698.
- Brunet, P., Simard, M., & Wuest, J. D. (1997). Molecular tectonics. Porous hydrogen-bonded networks with unprecedented structural integrity. Journal of the American Chemical Society, 119(11), 2737–2738.
- Beaudoin, D., Maris, T., & Wuest, J. D. (2013). Constructing monocrystalline covalent organic networks by polymerization. Nature Chemistry, 5(10), 830–834.
- Dang, M. T., Hirsch, L., Wantz, G., & Wuest, J. D. (2013). Controlling the morphology and performance of bulk heterojunctions in solar cells. Lessons learned from the benchmark poly (3-hexylthiophene):[6, 6]-phenyl-C61-butyric acid methyl ester system. Chemical Reviews, 113(5), 3734–3765.
- Lévesque, A., Maris, T., & Wuest, J. D. (2020) ROY Reclaims Its Crown: New Ways to Increase Polymorphic Diversity. Journal of the American Chemical Society, 142(27), 11873−11883.
