= Theodore Sourkes =

Canadian biochemist and neuropsychopharmacologist

Theodore Lionel Sourkes
- Born: February 21, 1919; Montreal, Quebec, Canada
- Died: January 17, 2015 (aged 95); Montreal, Quebec
- Resting place: Montreal Workers' Circle, Baron de Hirsch Cemetery, Montreal
- Education: McGill University; Cornell University
- Awards: Order of Canada; Prix Wilder-Penfield
- Scientific career
- Fields: Biochemistry
- Workplaces: McGill University
- Doctoral advisor: James B. Sumner

Theodore Lionel Sourkes, OC FRSC (February 21, 1919 – January 17, 2015) was a Canadian biochemist and neuropsychopharmacologist who helped advance the treatment of Parkinson's disease and hypertension.

Born in Montreal, Quebec, Sourkes received a Bachelor of Science degree in Nutritional Sciences from McGill University in 1939. Unable to fight in Canadian Army during World War II due to his poor eyesight, he worked in a chemical engineering factory in Toronto during the war. After the war, he received a Master of Science degree from McGill studying under Earle Wilcox Crampton. He received a Ph.D. from Cornell University in 1948 working with James B. Sumner. He worked briefly as assistant professor in pharmacology at Georgetown University before joining the Merck Institute for Therapeutic Research. While there, he helped in the development of α-methyldopa, an antihypertensive drug. In 1953, he returned to McGill University in the Department of Psychiatry where he stayed for the rest of his career.

He died of pneumonia on January 17, 2015, at the Montreal General Hospital. He was buried at the Montreal Workers' Circle section of the Baron de Hirsch Cemetery, Montreal. "His archives are held at McGill University in the Osler Library of the History of Medicine

== Family life ==
He married Shena Rosenblatt on January 17, 1943. They had three children: Doreen, who died of Tay–Sachs disease when she was 3, Barbara, and Myra.

== Honours ==
In 1971, he was made a Fellow of the Royal Society of Canada. In 1992, he was made an Officer of Order of Canada. In 1998, he was awarded the Government of Quebec's Prix Wilder-Penfield.
