= Claude Roy (physician) =

Canadian doctor in Quebec (born 1928)

Claude Roy OC OQ
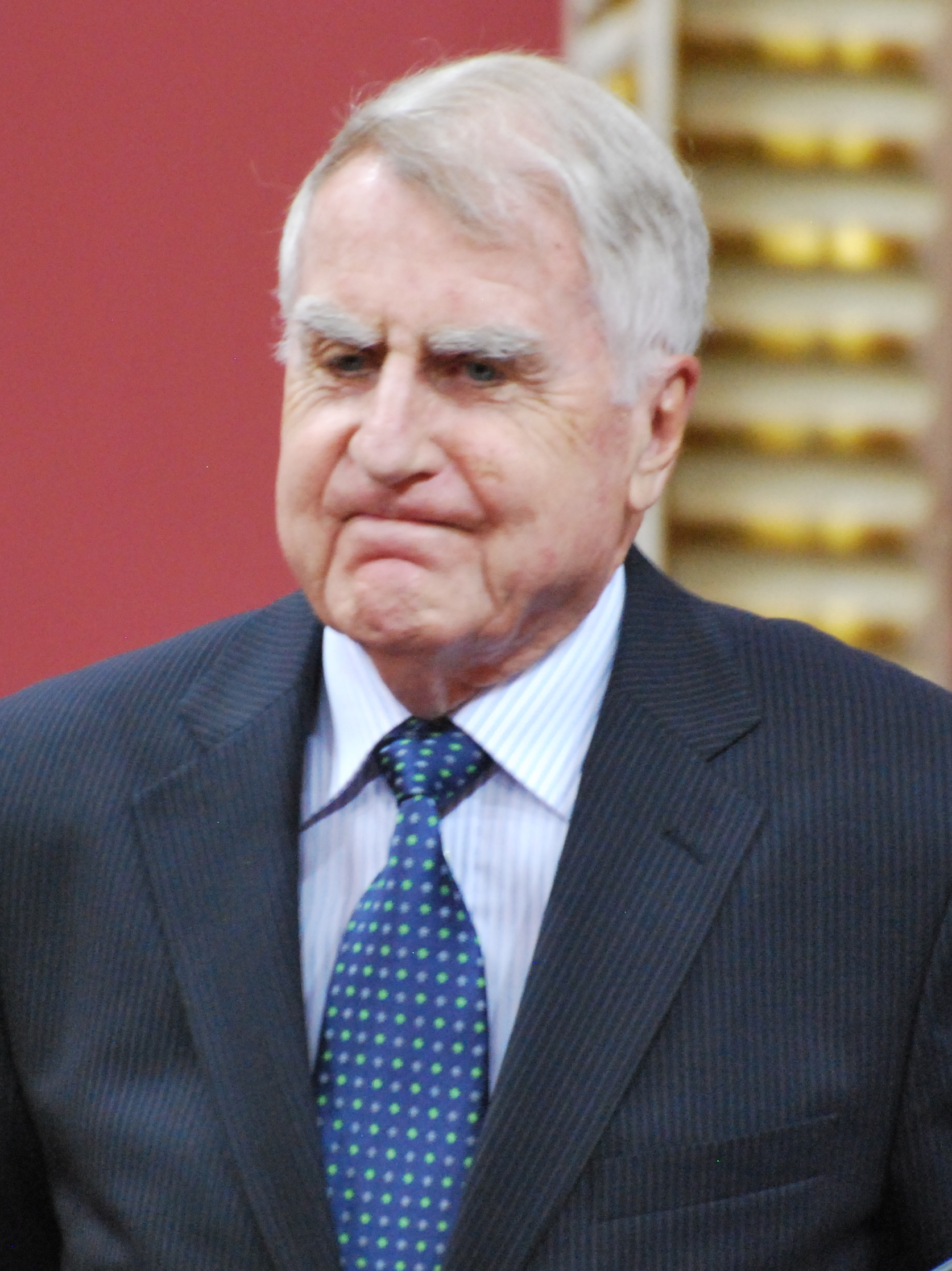
- Born: October 21, 1928; Quebec City, Canada
- Died: July 2, 2015 (aged 86)
- Education: Université Lavalawards=Canadian Medical Hall of Fame; Prix Michel-Sarrazin
- Medical career
- Institutions: Centre hospitalier universitaire Sainte-Justine
- Sub-specialties: paediatric gastroenterology
- Notable works: Pediatric Clinical Gastroenterology

Claude C. Roy OC OQ (October 21, 1928 to July 2, 2015) was a Canadian doctor in Quebec. He is considered one of the founding fathers of the field of paediatric gastroenterology.

He was born in Quebec City and studied medicine at the Université Laval and pediatrics at McGill University and Harvard University. He spent the next six years at the University of Colorado. Roy returned to Canada and became director of research at the Centre hospitalier universitaire Sainte-Justine. He was, at various times, a member of the council, program director and principal adviser to the president of the Medical Research Council of Canada, later the Canadian Institutes of Health Research.

Roy's major research contributions have been in the areas of infant nutrition, chronic liver disease in infants and cystic fibrosis.

His book Pediatric Clinical Gastroenterology has been the primary textbook in its field for many years. The First International Symposium on Pediatric Gastroenterology and Nutrition was held in his honour in Montreal in 1995.

He was named an Officer of the Order of Canada in 1990. In 2013, he was inducted into the Canadian Medical Hall of Fame. Also in 2013, he was named an officer in the National Order of Quebec. Roy was awarded the Prix Michel-Sarrazin in 1993. Dr. Roy died on July 2, 2015.
