= Paul Jolicoeur =

Canadian scientist (born 1945)

Paul Jolicoeur (born 1945) is a Québecois professor and doctor.

He has been a teacher since 1976 at the Faculty of Medicine at the Université de Montréal, where he holds the Canada Research Chair in infectious and parasitic diseases. His principal specialisms are the detection of new oncogenes, the study of degenerative neurological illnesses and research into AIDS.

== Honours and awards ==
- 1985 – Marcel-Piché Prize
- 1986 – Medal of the Royal College
- 1989 – Made a member of the Royal Society of Canada
- 1992 – Received the Léo-Pariseau Prize
