= Krešimir Krnjević =

Canadian university teacher (1927–2021)

Krešimir Krnjević (7 September 1927 – 16 April 2021) was a Canadian-British neurophysiologist of Croatian extraction.

== Life and work ==
Krnjević was born in Zagreb in the family of prominent politician Juraj Krnjević and spent most of his childhood abroad, including in Geneva, London and Cape Town. He attended the University of Edinburgh earning MBChb in 1949, BSc in physiology in 1951 and PhD in 1953 all at the University of Edinburgh, where he also won the Goodsir Memorial Fellowship, 1951 for his thesis on “Vagal afferent activity in the nodose ganglion". He continued his post-doctoral studies at the University of Washington, Seattle, 1954–1956, and at the John Curtin School of Medical Research, Australian National University, Canberra, 1956–1958 after which he returned to the UK as Senior Principal Scientist Research Office at Babraham Institute, Cambridge.

After an invitation to be a visiting professor at McGill University, Canada in 1964 he remained there as McGill's director of Anesthesia Research Department until 1999 and professor of physiology from 1978 to 1987.

He gained worldwide recognition early, clarifying the role of chemical control processes in the brain. Especially important are his discoveries of the nature of chemical neurotransmitters. For research he used techniques and knowledge he acquired during his stay in Canberra. John W. Phillis and Krnjević discovered inhibitory action of gamma-aminobutyric acid and excitatory action of glutamate in the mammalian brain and made important contributions to the clarification of the role which glutamic acid and γ-aminobutyric acid (GABA) have for the signal processing in the brain. He clarified a slow, but prolonged driving action of acetylcholine (ACh) and showed that such a specific effect of ACh is associated with a reduction in permeability of nerve cells for K ions. He found a key role of cellular calcium ions in the regulation of membrane permeability for potassium. Notable is his contribution to the elucidation of the physiological processes in the brain associated with hypoxia.

In 1981, the publication Current Contents called Krnjevic one of the 1,000 most cited contemporary scientists and named three of his papers "citation classics." He was a chief editor of the Canadian Journal of Physiology and Pharmacology, and published over 200 scientific articles and about 100 book chapters.

== Awards, memberships and academic posts (selected) ==
- 1952–1954 Beit Memorial Fellow
- 1975 Fellow of the Royal Society of Canada
- 1978 Alexander Forbes Lecturer
- 1979 President of the Canadian Physiological Society
- 1983–1993 Council member of International Union of Physiological Sciences
- 1984 Gairdner Foundation International Award
- 1987 Officer of the Order of Canada
- 1989 Jasper Lecturer Canadian Association for Neuroscience
- 1992 Corresponding member of the Croatian Academy of Sciences and Arts
- 1997 Prix Wilder-Penfield
- 1998 Kershman Lecturer, Eastern EEG Association
- 2001 Queen Elizabeth II Diamond Jubilee Medal

== Selected publications ==
- K. Krnjević; R. Miledi (1958). "Failure of neuromuscular propagation in rats". The Journal of Physiology. 140 (3): 440–461. PMC 1358769. PMID 13514717.
- K. Krnjević; J.W. Phillis (1963). "Iontophoretic studies of neurons in the mammalian cerebral cortex". The Journal of Physiology. 165 (2): 274–304. doi:10.1113/jphysiol.1963.sp007057. PMC 1359271. PMID 14035891.
- K. Krnjević; J.W. Phillis (1963). "Pharmacological properties of acetylcholine-sensitive cells in the cerebral cortex". The Journal of Physiology. 166 (2): 328–350. doi:10.1113/jphysiol.1963.sp007107. PMC 1359332. PMID 16992146.
- K. Krnjević; J.W. Phillis (1963). "Acetylcholine-sensitive cells in the cerebral cortex". The Journal of Physiology. 166 (2): 296–327. doi:10.1113/jphysiol.1963.sp007106. PMC 1359331. PMID 14035889.
- K. Krnjević; J.W. Phillis (1963). "Actions of certain amines on cerebral cortical neurones". Br J Pharmacol Chemother. 20 (3): 471–490. doi:10.1111/j.1476-5381.1963.tb01484.x. PMC 1703804. PMID 14035890.
- Krnjević, K.; Susan Schwartz (1967). "The action of γ-Aminobutyric acid on cortical neurones". Experimental Brain Research. 3 (4): 320–336. doi:10.1007/BF00237558. PMID 6031164. S2CID 6891616.
- K. Krnjević (1970). "Glutamate and γ-Aminobutyric Acid in Brain". Nature. 228 (5267): 119–124. Bibcode:1970Natur.228..119K. doi:10.1038/228119a0. PMID 4394110. S2CID 4214880.
- K. Krnjević; R. Pumain; L. Renaud (1971). "The mechanism of excitation by acetylcholine in the cerebral cortex". The Journal of Physiology. 215 (1): 247–268. doi:10.1113/jphysiol.1971.sp009467. PMC 1331876. PMID 5579661.
- K. Krnjević; A. Lisiewicz (1972). "Injections of calcium ions into spinal motoneurones". The Journal of Physiology. 225 (2): 336–390. doi:10.1113/jphysiol.1972.sp009945. PMC 1331111. PMID 5074394.
- K. Krnjević (1974). "Chemical Nature of Synaptic Transmission in Vertebrates". Physiological Reviews. 54 (2): 418–540. doi:10.1152/physrev.1974.54.2.418.
