= Pavel Hamet =

Canadian academic

Pavel Hamet is a doctor, researcher, editor, academic administrator and teacher in Quebec, Canada.

Working in the medical field, he is the Canada Research Chair in Predictive Genomics of hypertension and cardiovascular diseases. He is Professor of Medicine at the University of Montreal, Adjunct Professor of Experimental Medicine at McGill University, and visiting professor at the First Faculty of Medicine at Charles University, Prague, Czech Republic. He is currently Chief of Gene Medicine and member of the Endocrinology Services at the University of Montreal's Research Centre (CRCHUM). He was designated president of the International Society of Pathophysiology (ISP) from 2010 to 2014. Associated editor of the Journal of Hypertension, he is also a member of the Commission de l'éthique en science et en technologie of the Quebec government and president, chief of the scientific direction of Medpharmgene. compagny.

== Biography ==
Born in Czech Republic (or Protectorate of Bohemia and Moravia), Pavel Hamet received his Doctorate in medicine in 1967 from Charles University, a Ph.D. in Experimental Medicine from McGill University in 1972, and a CSPQ in Endocrinology from Université de Montréal in 1974. He then completed two years of postdoctoral training at Vanderbilt University in the US after which he started his career as a microbiologist. In 1966, he had the opportunity to visit Montreal during a contest organized by the International Federation of Medical Students' Association (IFMSA). In 1967, he finished a PhD in medicine at Charles University, the same year he established in Quebec.

Once in Montreal, he met with Jacques Genest who offered him a scholarship at the Institut de recherches cliniques de Montréal (IRCM) affiliated with the University of Montreal. He then founded and directed the University of Montreal's Research Centre (CRCHUM) from 1996 to 2006. From 2014, Hamet led a public-private $18.4 million project for Optimization of personalized therapeutic approaches in primary care entitled Optithera.

== Contributions ==
Hamet is the author or co-author of over 575 scientific publications and holds several international patents. He serves on many national and international committees including the Canadian Institute of Circulatory and Respiratory Health (ICRH). His major scientific contributions are in the areas of hypertension, diabetes and cardiovascular diseases, using approaches that range from bench to the bedside of the patient. Hamet contributed to the establishment of the role of the second messenger cGMP in signal transduction of hormones (this enzyme became later the target of Viagra); he improved the treatment of hypertension (HTN) in Canada, contributed to the research on diabetes, a field in which he is still working on identifying the genetic determinants responsible for complications and establishing the foundations of personalized medicine in Québec.

== Recognition ==
Hamet has received many honors, including the Harry Goldblatt Award from the American Heart Association in 1990 for his achievements in the field of hypertension. In 2008, Hamet had the honor to be named as an Officer of the Ordre National du Québec and he received the prestigious Okamoto Award from the Japan Vascular Disease Research Foundation.

In 2012, the Société Francophone du Diabète (France) honoured him with the Roger Assan Award and in 2013 he received from the Centre de Recherche du CHUM "le Prix Excellence" to underline his remarkable career.

=== Awards ===
- 1975: Jonathan-Ballon-Memorial Prize from The Heart and Stroke Foundation of Québec
- 1981: Astra Prize from the Société canadienne de l'hypertension artérielle
- 1983: Academy of Great Montrealers (medicine)
- 1989: Marcel-Piché Prize from the Institut de recherches cliniques de Montréal (IRCM)
- 1990: Harry-Goldblatt Prize from the American Heart Association
- 1994: Gold medal of the Academy of Sciences of the Czech Republic
- 1996: Prix du scientifique de renommée de la Société canadienne de recherches cliniques
- 2000: Médecin de mérite (20th anniversary of de L'Actualité médicale)
- 2001: Wilder-Penfield Prize
- 2005: Michel-Sarrazin Prize
- 2006: Great Montrealer
- 2006: Canada Research Chair in Predictive Genomics
- 2008: Officer of the National Order of Québec
- 2010: President of the Ambassadors Club
- 2012: Roger Assan Prize of The société francophone du diabète
- 2013: Excellence Prize of the CHUM
