= Marc Cantin =

Canadian doctor and professor

- Born: 1933
- Died: June 18, 1990 (aged 56–57)
- Occupations: Medical researcher, physician, college professor

Marc Cantin (1933 – June 18, 1990) was a Canadian Québécois doctor and professor, who directed research on heart disease, especially hypertension.

Cantin earned his medical degree at Laval University in Quebec and completed a Ph.D. at the University of Montreal, with postdoctoral studies in pathology at University of Chicago. He was a professor at the University of Montreal, McGill University and worked with medical researchers Hans Selye and Jacques Genest.

In 1980, Cantin began to direct the hypertension research group at the Clinical Research Institute at Montreal. In 1984 he won the Prix Marcel-Piché. In 1986, he won the Prix Léo-Pariseau. In 1988, he and Philip Needleman shared the Distinguished Research Award from the American Heart Association. The Quebec Heart Foundation honored Cantin and his research team in 1989. He was one of the "most-cited scientists" during the 1980s.

Cantin died in 1990. The Rue Marc-Cantin in Montreal's Technopark was named in his memory in 1992.

== Publications ==
- "Excessive Stimulation of Salivary Gland Growth by Isoproterenol" (1961, with Hans Selye and Rene Veilleux)
- "Scanning electron microscopy of surface irregularities and thrombogenesis of polyurethane and polyethylene coronary catheters" (1976, with M. G. Bourassa, E. B. Sandborn, and E. Pederson)
- "Atrial natriuretic factor inhibits adenylate cyclase activity" (1984, with Madhu B. Anand-Srivastava, Douglas J. Franks, and Jacques Genest)
- "Effect of a purified atrial natriuretic factor on rat and rabbit vascular strips and vascular beds" (1984, with R. Garcia, G. Thibault, and J. Genest)
- "The Heart as an Endocrine Gland" (1986, with Jacques Genest)
- "Atrial natriuretic factor" (1987, with Jacques Genest)
- "Atrial natriuretic factor receptors are negatively coupled to adenylate cyclase in cultured atrial and ventricular cardiocytes" (1987, with Madhu B. Anand-Srivastava)
- "Role of right and left atria in natriuresis and atrial natriuretic factor release during blood volume changes in the conscious rat" (1987, with R. Garcia and G. Thibault)
