= Social Sciences and Humanities Research Council =

Canadian funding body (Tri-council)

Social Sciences and Humanities Research Council of Canada
- Conseil de recherches en sciences humaines du Canada

Agency overview
- Formed: May 1, 1978; 48 years ago
- Jurisdiction: Government of Canada
- Headquarters: 125 Zaida Eddy Private, 2nd Floor, Ottawa, Ontario, K1R 0E3 Canada; 45°25′14.5″N 75°43′02.1″W
- Employees: 260 (approximately)
- Annual budget: CA$ 1.1 billion
- Minister responsible: Hon. François-Philippe Champagne, Minister of Industry
- Agency executive: Ted Hewitt, President
- Parent department: Innovation, Science and Economic Development Canada
- Website: www.sshrc-crsh.gc.ca

The Social Sciences and Humanities Research Council of Canada (SSHRC; French: Conseil de recherches en sciences humaines du Canada, CRSH; often colloquially pronounced 'shirk', /ʃɜːrk/) is a Canadian federal research-funding agency that promotes and supports post-secondary research and training in the humanities and social sciences.

In 2019–2020, SSHRC funded 24,000 researchers and 5000 research trainees in 51 programs. Staff numbers were reported as 333 in the same period. Ted Hewitt is the current President. SSHRC's provided CA$684 million for funding and $453 million institutional support for the fiscal year 2023-2024 and the number of employees (FTE) was 258.

Along with the Canadian Institutes for Health Research (CIHR) and the Natural Sciences and Engineering Research Council (NSERC), SSHRC forms the major source of federal government funding to post-secondary research. They are collectively referred to as the "Tri-Council" or "Tri-Agency.

== History ==
Created by an act of the Parliament of Canada in 1977, SSHRC reports to Parliament through the Minister of Innovation, Science, and Economic Development. SSHRC came into existence on 1 May 1978 under the Social Sciences and Humanities Research Council Act which was passed in an omnibus manner by the government of Pierre Elliot Trudeau.

In June 2013, SSHRC's governing council endorsed six future challenge areas developed during its Imagining Canada's Future initiative, with a goal of addressing Canada's future societal challenges and meeting future opportunities through social sciences and humanities research.

The 2025-26 Departmental Plan portrayed the core responsibilities as two-fold:

1. Funding Social Sciences and Humanities Research and Training
2. Institutional Support for the Indirect Costs of Research

=== Presidents ===
- André Fortier (1978–1982)
- William Ewart Taylor Jr. (1982–1988)
- Paule Leduc (1988–1994)
- Lynn Penrod (1994–1997)
- Marc Renaud (1997–2005)
- Chad Gaffield (2006–2014)
- Ted Hewitt (2015-current)

== Governance ==
SSHRC creates policy, plans budgets, and directs priorities through a council established by the federal government. The appointed members are a mix of academics and representatives from the industry. They have the role of advising the Minister of Innovation, Science and Economic Development on research policy in the areas of research and scholarship in the social sciences and humanities, with the goal of representing the interests of academic, public and private sectors. Council committees create and oversee SSHRC's programs, determine the distribution of funds and handles the strategies for enacting the council's policies.

== Programs ==
SSHRC funding opportunities are very diverse and include partnerships with other institutions. They are organized into three program streams: Talent, Insight and Connection (plus thematic and strategic grants and initiatives).

=== Talent program ===
The Talent program is a training program designed to support students and postdoctoral candidates to become researchers and leaders across society, both within academia and across the public, private and not-for-profit sectors.

=== Insight program ===
The Insight program is to build knowledge and understanding about people, societies and the world by supporting research in all subject areas eligible for funding from SSHRC.

=== Connection program ===
The Connection program is to realize the potential of social sciences and humanities research for intellectual, cultural, social and economic influence, benefit and impact on and beyond the campus by supporting specific activities and tools that facilitate the flow and exchange of research knowledge.

A program entitled Canada 150 Connection was set up for the 150th anniversary of Canada to support activities by post-secondary institutions and researchers that explore the contributions of social sciences and humanities research to Canadian society.

== Controversies ==
In 2009, Federal Science Minister Gary Goodyear asked SSHRC to reconsider funding for a conference on the future of Israel and Palestine at York University. In response the Canadian Association of University Teachers demanded (unsuccessfully) the resignation of the Minister for interfering with an academic funding decision.

== See also ==
- Canadian Institutes for Health Research (CIHR)
- Natural Sciences and Engineering Resesarch Council (NSERC)
- Canada Foundation for Innovation (CFI)
- Genome Canada (GE^{3}LS program funds humanities and social sciences)
- National Science Foundation - US counterpart
- Arts and Humanities Research Council - UK counterpart
- Economic and Social Research Council - UK counterpart
- Canadian Federation for the Humanities and Social Sciences (FHSS)
