= Chad Gaffield =

Canadian historian

Chad Gaffield OC FRSC
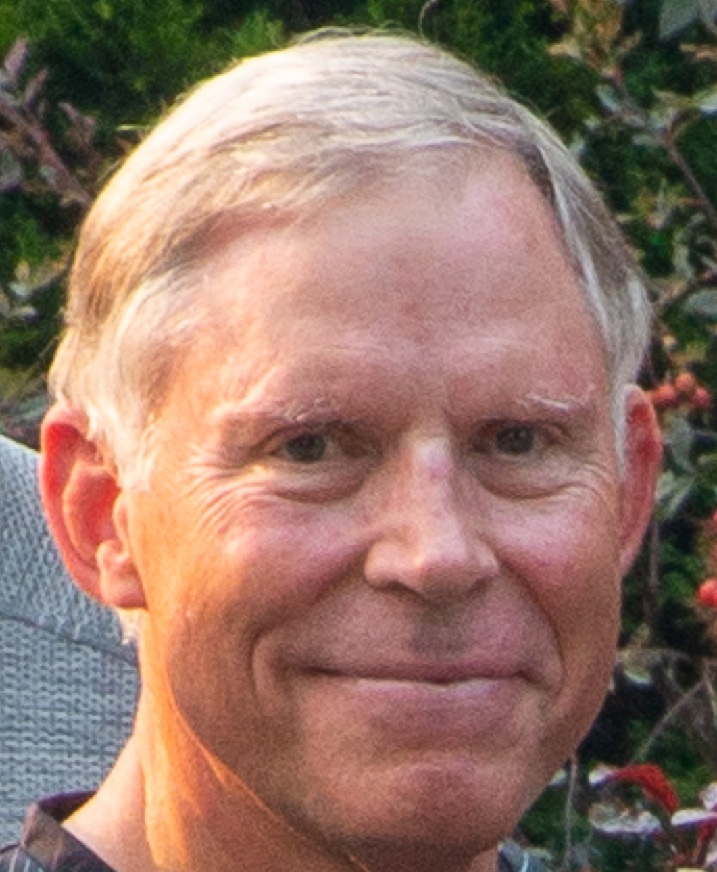
- Gaffield in 2021
- Occupation: Historian
- Employer: University of Ottawa
- Known for: Digital humanities, science policy
- Title: Distinguished University Professor and Professor of History Emeritus
- Awards: Officer of the Order of Canada; Fellow of the Royal Society of Canada

Chad Gaffield OC FRSC is a Distinguished University Professor and Professor of History Emeritus at the University of Ottawa in Canada. He is known for his expertise on the sociocultural history of Canada, as a pioneer of the digital humanities, and for his role in Canadian science policy.

== Education ==
Chad Gaffield received his BA and MA from McGill University, and his PhD from the University of Toronto.

== Career ==
Dr. Gaffield served as president of the Canadian Historical Association from 2000 to 2001 and led the interdisciplinary, multi-institutional and cross-sectoral Canadian Century Research Infrastructure (CCRI) initiative from 2001 to 2008.

He was appointed President and CEO of the Social Sciences and Humanities Research Council of Canada (SSHRC) in 2006 and served in this role until 2014. As president of SSHRC, he helped define a new model of innovation that reaffirms the contributions of social sciences and humanities research to our society, economy and quality of life.

In 2016, Dr. Gaffield became President-elect of the Royal Society of Canada (RSC), Canada’s national academy for all research fields. During his mandate as RSC President, 2017-2019, the RSC expanded engagement domestically and internationally including the launch of the G7 Research Summits.

From 2019 to 2024 he held the University Research Chair in Digital Scholarship at the University of Ottawa and from 2022 to 2025, he served as CEO of U15 Canada. As of 2019, he serves on the advisory board of the Leaders' Debates Commission.

== Select honours ==
- J.B. Tyrrell Historical Medal in (2004) for "outstanding contributions to the study of Canada"
- Antonio Zampolli Prize (2011) presented at Stanford University, for "outstanding output in the digital humanities"
- Doctor of Laws honoris causa from Carleton University (2015), "in recognition of his impressive accomplishments as a researcher, a visionary leader, and a spokesperson for the social sciences and humanities in Canada"
- Officer in the Order of Canada (2017) for "leadership in interdisciplinary collaboration [that] has transformed the research landscape in Canada"

Professional and academic associations
Preceded by Maryse Lassonde	President of the Royal Society of Canada; 2017–2019	Succeeded by Jeremy N. McNeil
