= André Barbeau =

Canadian neurologist

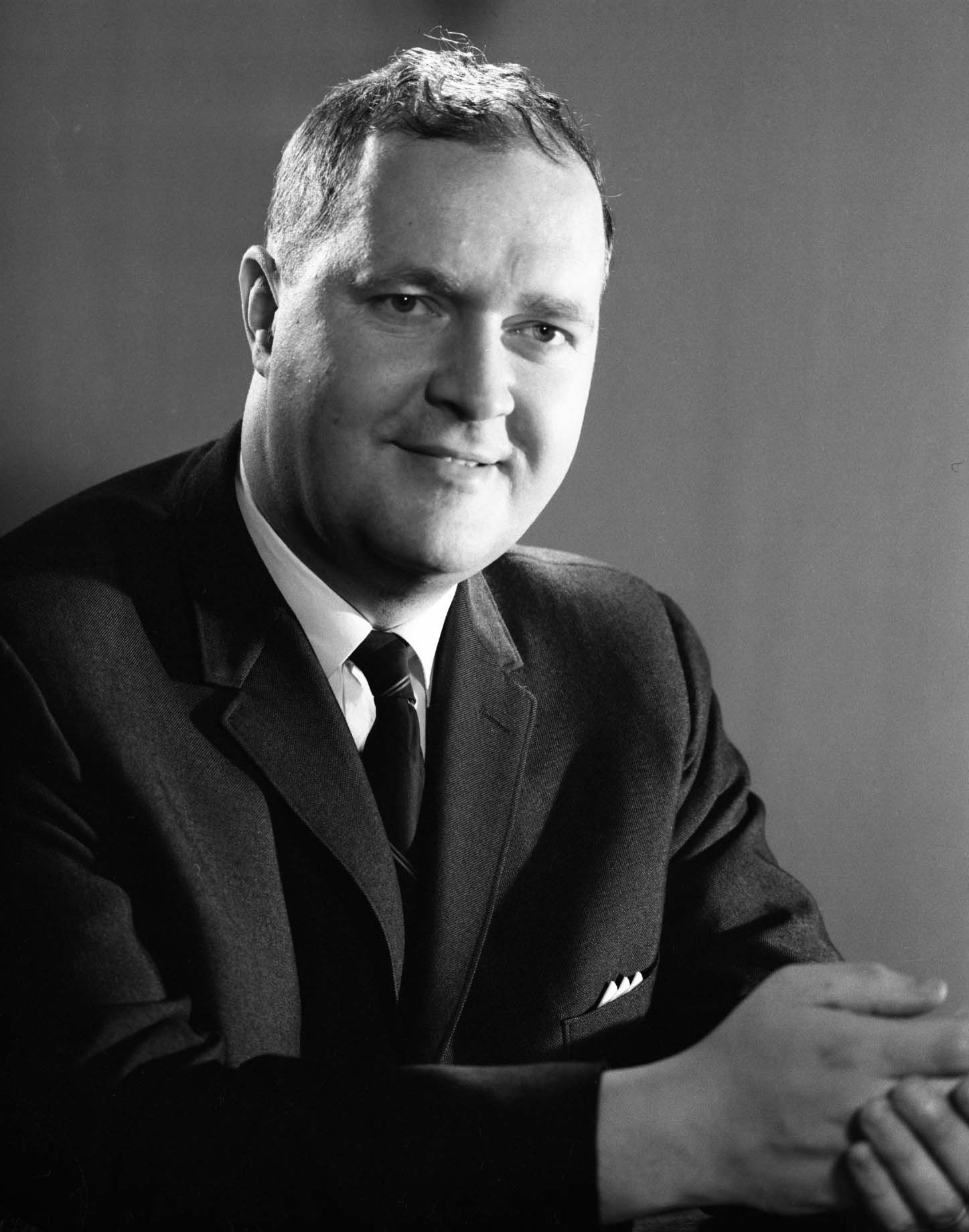
- Barbeau in 1966
- Born: 27 May 1931; Montreal, Quebec, Canada
- Died: 9 March 1986 (aged 54)
- Occupation: Neurologist

André Barbeau, OC MSRC (27 May 1931 – 9 March 1986) was a French Canadian neurologist. He was known for his research into Parkinson's disease and Friedreich's ataxia and taurine research.

Born in Montreal, Quebec, he received a Bachelor of Arts degree from Collège Stanislas and his medical degree from the Université de Montréal.

He was the director of the neurobiology department at the Institut de recherches cliniques de Montréal (Montreal Clinical Research Institute), affiliated with the Université de Montréal.

In 1980, he was made an Officer of the Order of Canada. In 1985, he was awarded the Quebec government's Prix Marie-Victorin. In 1986, he was awarded the Royal Society of Canada's McLaughlin Medal. He died in 1986 and was buried in Notre-Dame-des Cemetery in Montreal.
