= Eduardo Marbán =

Cuban-American cardiologist

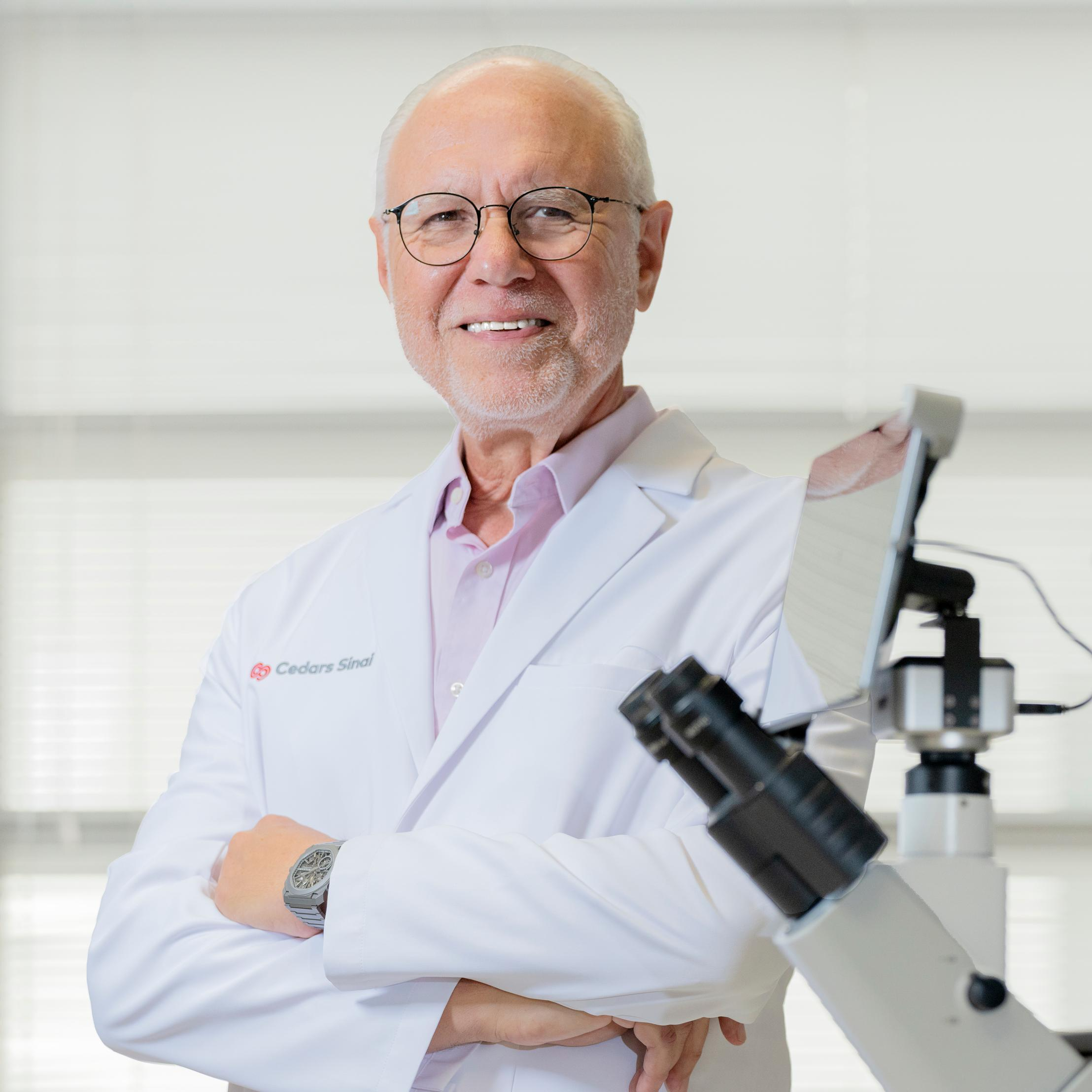
- Born: 1954 (age 71–72); Cuba
- Occupation: Cardiologist
- Years active: 1990s–present
- Known for: Creating the first de novo biological pacemaker; Developing Deramiocel; Use of stem cells to repair heart damage
- Title: Executive Director of the Smidt Heart Institute at Cedars-Sinai Medical Center

Academic background
- Education: Wilkes College (B.S); Yale School of Medicine (M.D.); Yale University (PhD)

Academic work
- Discipline: Cardiology; Cardiovascular disease; Gene therapy; Molecular biology; Neurobiology; Physiology

Eduardo Marbán (born 1954) is a Cuban-American cardiologist and medical researcher. He is executive director of the Smidt Heart Institute at Cedars-Sinai Medical Center in Los Angeles, where he has led research and implementation of cardiac stem-cell therapy and regenerative medicine.

Marbán directed the first clinical trial using heart-derived stem cells to repair damage from heart attacks and researched gene therapy for cardiac conditions. His contributions to medicine also include the creation of the first de novo biological pacemaker and development of the cell therapy Deramiocel for Duchenne muscular dystrophy. He is the former editor-in-chief of Circulation Research, a journal of the American Heart Association.

== Early life and education ==
Eduardo Marbán was born in Cuba in 1954. At age six, he and his parents came to the United States from Cuba as political refugees. They eventually settled in Virginia, and later Pennsylvania. His mother was a professor at Wilkes College. Marbán received a bachelor's degree in mathematics from Wilkes before entering a combined MD-PhD program. Marbán received his medical degree from Yale School of Medicine and PhD in physiology from Yale University.

== Career ==
After graduating from Yale, Marbán completed a cardiology fellowship at Johns Hopkins University. At Johns Hopkins, he was an assistant professor in 1985, becoming associate professor of medicine and physiology in 1991. Marbán was named the Michel Mirowski Professor of Cardiology in 1999. He became the founding director of the Institute of Molecular Cardiobiology at Johns Hopkins and also led the JHU-NHLBI Proteomics Center. Marbán later went on to serve as chief of cardiology at the Johns Hopkins School of Medicine.

Marbán served as editor-in-chief of Circulation Research, the flagship basic research journal of the American Heart Association, from 1999 to 2009.

Beginning in 2004, Marbán and his lab focused their research on cardiac progenitor cells, work that led to the development of Deramiocel, a cell therapy product for Duchenne muscular dystrophy-related cardiomyopathy.

In 2007, Marbán left his position as chief of cardiology at Johns Hopkins to become the founding director of the Smidt Heart Institute at Cedars-Sinai Medical Center in Los Angeles. At Cedars-Sinai, Marbán also assumed the role of directing the Board of Governors Heart Stem Cell Center. In 2020, he was named executive director of the Smidt Heart Institute and awarded the Mark S. Siegel Family Foundation Distinguished Professorship. As of 2025, Marbán continues to hold senior research and leadership positions at Cedars-Sinai and is director of the California Heart Center Foundation.

=== Research ===
Marbán created the first de novo biological pacemaker in 2002, as an alternative to electronic pacemakers. This technique used gene therapy methods to coax normally quiescent regions of the heart into firing automatically. By 2014, he and his team demonstrated that ordinary heart cells in living pigs could be reprogrammed into pacemaker cells through Tbx18 transduction.

He then led the first clinical trial in which a patient received an injection of their own heart cells to repair heart attack damage. The CADUCEUS trial followed patients for a year after they received intracoronary infusions of autologous cardiosphere-derived cells (CDCs) following a heart attack. Compared to controls, those who received CDCs had smaller heart scars, more viable heart tissue, and better function in regions affected by the heart attack. These regenerative effects persisted for one year, with no major safety concerns. The findings suggest this CDC therapy may help heart muscle heal after a heart attack, warranting further study. These studies showed that cardiosphere-derived cell therapy significantly reduced scar tissue and promoted growth of new heart muscle, as demonstrated by MRI. Marbán then utilized his cell therapy techniques on cases of Duchenne muscular dystrophy. This study found that injecting CDCs, or the exosomes they release, into mouse models of the disease led to improvements in heart and muscle function. While CDCs and their exosomes did little to restore the missing dystrophin protein in the treated muscles, the anti-inflammatory and immunomodulatory effects of the treatments notably blunted tissue damage. A subsequent clinical trial (HOPE-3) suggests that CDCs could become a promising therapy for Duchenne muscular dystrophy in people. An FDA decision on Deramiocel is due on August 22, 2026.

Marbán's research team adapted their cardiac cell therapy to treat six critically ill COVID-19 patients with heart and organ involvement during the COVID-19 pandemic. The therapy appeared safe, without serious side effects. Most patients showed lower inflammation markers and some increase in lymphocyte counts, suggesting reduced inflammation. Compared to a control group from the same hospital, which had a higher mortality rate, these results seemed promising, but more research in larger trials is needed.

Marbán has researched extracellular vesicles as therapeutic platforms, resulting in the development of noncoding RNA drugs. His work led to the first California Institute for Regenerative Medicine (CIRM) grant to provide funding to develop approved Investigational New Drug (IND) applications. CIRM also supported the Phase II ALLSTAR trial of allogenic CDCs in patients post-myocardial infarction.

== Select publications ==
- Gamal-Eldin Ibrahim, Ahmed; Ciullo, Alessandra; Komuro, Hiroaki; Miyamoto, Kazutaka; Marbán, Eduardo (December 3, 2025). "Augmentation of DNA exonuclease TREX1 in macrophages as a therapy for cardiac ischemic injury". Science Translational Medicine. 17 (827). Archived from the original on December 6, 2025.
- Singh, Siddharth; Chakravarty, Tarun; Chen, Peter; Akhmerov, Akbarshakh; et al. (March 13, 2018). "Exosome-Mediated Benefits of Cell Therapy in Mouse and Human Models of Duchenne Muscular Dystrophy". Stem Cell Reports. 10 (3). International Society for Stem Cell Research: 942–955.
- A. Aminzadeh, Mark; G. Rogers, Russell; Fournier, Mario; E. Tobin, Rachel; et al. (March 13, 2018). "Exosome-Mediated Benefits of Cell Therapy in Mouse and Human Models of Duchenne Muscular Dystrophy". Stem Cell Reports. 10 (3). International Society for Stem Cell Research: 942–955.
- Marbán, Eduardo; Frederick Dawkins, James; Cheol Cho, Hee; Cingolani, Eugenio (July 16, 2014). "Biological pacemaker created by minimally invasive somatic reprogramming in pigs with complete heart block". Science Translational Medicine. 16 (6). American Association for the Advancement of Science: 245.
- Marbán, Eduardo; Malliaras, Konstantinos; R Makkar, Raj; R Smith, Rachel; et al. (September 11, 2013). "Intracoronary cardiosphere-derived cells after myocardial infarction: evidence of therapeutic regeneration in the final 1-year results of the CADUCEUS trial (CArdiosphere-Derived aUtologous stem CElls to reverse ventricUlar dySfunction)". Journal of the American College of Cardiology. 63 (2). Elsevier Biomedical.
- McDonald, Craig; Marbán, Eduardo; Hendrix, Suzanne; Hogan, Nathaniel; et al. (March 12, 2022). "Repeated intravenous cardiosphere-derived cell therapy in late-stage Duchenne muscular dystrophy (HOPE-2): a multicentre, randomised, double-blind, placebo-controlled, phase 2 trial". The Lancet. 399 (10329). Elsevier Ltd.
