= Jacques Leblanc =

Canadian scientist

Jacques Leblanc (August 23, 1921 – November 13, 2012) is a Québécois physiologist and professor, born in Saint-Joachim-de-Montmorency. He is considered to be one of the pioneers of contemporary biomedical research in Quebec and Canada.

== Honours/Awards ==
- 1989 - Winner of the Prix Marie-Victorin
- 1991 - Winner of the Léo-Pariseau Prize
- 1992 - Made an emeritus member of American College of Foot and Ankle Surgeons
- 1994 - Winner of the Prix Michel-Sarrazin
