= Charles Philippe Leblond =

Canadian cell biology researcher, professor

- Born: February 5, 1910; Lille, France
- Died: April 10, 2007 (aged 97); Montreal, Quebec, Canada
- Education: University of Paris; Université de Montréal; Yale University
- Known for: Autoradiography; Stem cell discovery
- Awards: Flavelle Medal (1961); Gairdner Foundation Award (1965)
- Scientific career
- Fields: Biology
- Workplaces: McGill University

Charles Philippe Leblond CC GOQ FRS FRMS FRSC (February 5, 1910 – April 10, 2007) was a pioneer of cell biology and stem cell research and a Canadian former professor of anatomy. Leblond is notable for developing autoradiography and his work showing how cells continuously renew themselves, regardless of age.

== Main research interests ==
In 1946, Leblond found that, when he poured liquid photographic emulsion on a histological section containing a radio element, the emulsion was eventually activated by the radio-element; and if thereafter routine photographic development and fixation were applied to the emulsion-covered section, black silver grains appeared in the emulsion wherever it overlay sites containing a radio-element. This liquid emulsion approach has been used to develop a new high-resolution autoradiography procedure characterized by close contact between emulsion and section. Such close contact makes it possible to localize the radio-elements in the section at high resolution, so that radio-elements can be localized at high magnification in the light microscope.

This procedure has been utilized to examine some of the dynamic features of body components, with the main findings as follows:

1. The existence of stem cells in adult organs, as shown by autoradiography with labeled thymidine.
2. The continuity of protein synthesis in living cells, as shown by autoradiography with labeled amino acids.
3. The key role of the Golgi apparatus in protein glycosylation, as shown by autoradiography with labeled hexoses.

His results threw doubt on the validity of three traditional concepts dear to biologists in the earlier part of the twentieth century: "stability" of the cell, in which the cell and its components are unchanging, permanent structures; "specificity" of cell function, in which each cell type has a distinct, unique function; and "activity-rest alternation" of cell function, in which each period of cellular activity is followed by a period during which the activity ceases.

He has proposed replacing cell "specificity" by "multipotentiality", "activity-rest alternation" by "continuity" and "stability" of cell components by "renewal". These various results have provided the foundation not only for modern stem cell research, but also for modern cell biology.

As Nobel laureate George Palade noted on the occasion of the 1992 Prix Marie-Victorin to Leblond, Charles Leblond's discoveries are so fundamental that they are taught in schools and colleges throughout the world.

== Biography ==
=== Early days ===
CP Leblond was born in Lille, France, in 1910, the son of a building contractor who died when Leblond was only 10 years old, leaving his mother to raise four boys on her own. A brilliant student, Leblond debated becoming a film producer, an architect or a scientist. In the end, he decided on science, and enrolled in Medicine at the University of Paris. He was fascinated by his first course in histology and decided to pursue this field as a career.

Leblond obtained his M.D. degree from the University of Paris in 1934. His doctoral thesis described the histochemical localizion of ascorbic acid, which he found to predominate in steroid-secreting cells. This study led him, with a Rockefeller postdoctoral fellowship in hand, to the endocrinology-orientated Department of Anatomy at Yale University in 1935, where he carried out studies on factors influencing maternal behavior. It was here that he met his wife Gertrude Sternschuss, to whom he was married for 64 years. Leblond had 4 children for which he chose names starting with the letter "P": Philippe, Paul, Pierre and (Marie)-Pascale. He also had 7 grandchildren.

In 1937, Leblond joined the Laboratoire de Synthese Atomique in Paris which was involved in preparing radioactive isotopes for use in investigating the fate of various molecules in biological processes. Under the guidance of Antoine Lacassagne, Leblond injected radioiodine-128, into a rat and found that the label promptly accumulated in the thyroid gland, presumably incorporated into the thyroid hormone precursor thyroglobulin. To localize this label more precisely within the thyroid tissue, Leblond attempted to use the novel technique of autoradiography.

Unfortunately, Leblond's first attempt to use autoradiography failed, the reason being that the radioiodine-128 isotope, with its extremely short half-life (25 minutes), disintegrated so quickly that too little radioactivity remained to be detected by the photographic emulsion.

=== Development of autoradiography ===
In 1941, Leblond moved to McGill University as a lecturer in histology, and quickly rose to assistant (1943), associate (1946), and then full professor of anatomy (1948). He served as the chair of the Department of Anatomy from 1957 to 1974.

At McGill, Leblond used the newly-available radioiodine-131 with a half-life of 8 days, to repeat his autoradiographic experiment on thyroid tissue. With this method, the resolving power was less than 100 μm, but nonetheless he was able to localize the radioactivity to specific thyroid [follicles].

Leblond's early career at McGill was interrupted by World War II, during which he served in the Free French Forces. He was dispatched first to Rio de Janeiro, then to London, where he conducted medical exams of would-be soldiers.

"In 1946, after returning to Montreal from service with the Free French Forces, it was clear to me that the crude technique previously used for radioautography had to be improved". In collaboration with Leonard Bélanger, Leblond worked on increasing the resolution of the autoradiographic technique. They were advised by physicist Pierre Demers to melt the emulsion from Eastman Kodak lantern slides, paint it directly on the sections, and then develop the emulsion while it was still attached to the histologic sections. This resulted in a tenfold improvement in resolution. Subsequently, Leblond and his colleagues developed a technique in which the histologic slides were dipped directly into liquid emulsion. The use of thinner sections and emulsion coats led to further advances in resolution, and the introduction of tritium was a technical milestone.

High Resolution Autoradiography procedure continues to be used today by molecular biologists to detect RNA molecules in situ, and to study the localization of genes and DNA sequences.

=== Studies on the turnover of cells ===
Leblond used autoradiography to introduce radioactive precursors of DNA and then examine the renewal and fate of cells of several basic tissue types. He demonstrated for the first time that most cells and tissues in the adult body undergo continued renewal. Using mathematical models and modern methods of quantitation, Leblond and his colleagues estimated with remarkable accuracy the turnover and mitotic rates of numerous cell types. He and his colleagues made fascinating discoveries that resulted in the introduction of "time dimension" to cells and tissues, opening the doors to the understanding of the cell cycle and to the identification of stem cells.

=== Identification of stem cells in adult organs ===
In the male seminiferous epithelium, studies by Leblond and Yves Clermont in the early 1950s had deciphered how spermatogonia gave rise to spermatocytes, which then differentiated into mature sperm cells in a specific cycle.

To maintain the population of spermatogonia, the seminiferous epithelium was shown to contain a population of stem cells which divided to produce differentiated cells as well as to maintain their own number. As noted in a seminal publication by Leblond, "the reappearance at each cycle of a new dormant cell which acts as the stem cell of spermatocytes is described as the 'Stem Cell Renewal Theory'". This article is the first one in which nests of cells dividing in an adult organ are designated as "stem cells".

Leblond and his colleagues also found evidence for the presence of occasional adult stem cells even in tissues which are composed almost entirely of non-dividing cells. In skeletal muscle, the muscle fibers had been shown to exhibit an age-related increase in the number of nuclei. His studies showed that muscle satellite cells could be considered to be adult stem cells in muscle fibers.

From the studies of Leblond and his colleagues, it was concluded that the body has three types of cell populations:

1. "Static cell populations", which are composed of non-dividing cells and include no adult stem cells. These populations have the "stability" formerly attributed to all cells
2. "Expanding cell populations" in which small numbers of adult stem cells exist, and give rise to skeletal fiber nuclei or glial cells of the brain
3. "Renewing cell populations" in which adult stem cells are an essential feature

To mark his 65th birthday in 1975, Leblond was honored at an international symposium on the existence of stem cells in adult tissues; the resulting book, Stem Cells of Renewing Cell Populations, was the first formal, comprehensive account on the subject.

=== Continuous protein synthesis in living cells ===
When Leblond and his colleagues used 14C-bicarbonate, and then 35S-labeled amino acids to investigate protein synthesis, they were astonished to find that virtually all cells in the body incorporated label. This led them to the conclusion, considered heretical at the time, that all cells continually synthesized proteins. This was among the first evidence to replace the Specificity concept with the idea that most cells are multipotential in their functions.

It is of interest that autoradiographic studies by Leblond during this period also settled a controversy regarding the cellular site of synthesis of ribonucleic acid. Using radiolabeled cytidine in some forty cell types, he and his colleagues were the first to demonstrate decisively that RNA is continuously synthesized in the nucleus and then migrates to the cytoplasm.

=== Role of the Golgi apparatus in protein glycosylation ===
A majority of body proteins is glycosylated, although the proportion of carbohydrates in proteins is quite variable. Leblond had shown in earlier studies that the Golgi region in most cell types was dramatically stained by the periodic acid-Schiff staining technique, which is specially directed to carbohydrate-rich proteins carrying 1,2 glycols. In the electron microscope, using the periodic acid silver technique, there was a gradient of staining intensity from the cis to the trans side of the Golgi apparatus, suggesting that carbohydrate residues were added to proteins at this site.

To test this hypothesis, light and then EM autoradiographic studies were carried out by Leblond and Neutra in 1966 after injecting rats with 3H-glucose or 3H-galactose. Within ten minutes, the label was dramatically localized to the Golgi apparatus of intestinal goblet cells, indicating that this was the cellular site of addition of sugar residues in the synthesis of the carbohydrate side chains of mucous glycoproteins.

This discovery had a tremendous impact on the scientific community, being the first evidence for a functional role of the Golgi apparatus in the synthetic process.

=== Other studies ===
Other classics include: identification of how skeletal bones grow through osteoblast deposition and osteoclast remodeling, early discovery of the biogenesis and metabolism of thyroxine and detection of triiodothyronine, early prediction of DNA semiconservative replication published days after the Watson and Crick Nature article, the discovery of axonal transport, the Warshawsky et al. finding that nascent proteins are processed from the rough endoplasmic reticulum through the Golgi apparatus into pancreatic zymogen granules (made in hot competition with the Palade lab at Rockefeller University), the first realization that the Golgi apparatus is the site of terminal glycosylation, the discovery of the cell coat, the cellular biogenesis of collagen, and new insights into the ultrastructure of basement membrane.

=== Service ===
He served as the 39th president of the American Association of Anatomists from 1962 to 1963.

=== "Retirement" and later days ===
At 65, instead of retiring, Leblond continued his research with an NIH Fogarty Scholarship at the National Institute of Dental Research, where he learned about immunohistochemistry. This launched a twenty-year molecular exploration culminating in the concept of the basement membrane as an integrated polymer, rather than as layers of separated macromolecules initially favored by others.

Leblond continued to attend all weekly departmental seminars well into his 90s and continued to publish in peer-reviewed journals into the new millennium. He learned to use a computer at age 90, starting a presentation at an international conference back in 2004, by noting: "A month ago, I thought PowerPoint was a tool for sharpening pencils."

His total contributions resulted in the publication of 430 scientific papers, many of them still frequently cited. In late September 2006, he published his final article—about detecting the MMP9 cysteine activation switch for the first time in remodeling cartilage.

Leblond was preceded in death by his wife of 64 years, Gertrude Sternschuss, who died in 2000. After Gertrude died, Leblond married a childhood friend, Odette Lengrand, in 2001; they were both 91. Odette died in 2004.

== Honors ==
=== Honorary degrees of Doctor of Sciences ===
- Acadia University, 1972
- McGill University, 1982
- University of Montreal, 1985
- York University, 1986
- Sherbrooke University, 1988

=== Prizes ===
- Prix Saintour, French Academy, 1935
- Gairdner Foundation International Award, 1965
- Isaac Schour Award, International Association for Dental Research, 1974
- Henry Grey Award, American Association of Anatomists, 1978
- J.C.B. Grant Award, Canadian Association of Anatomists, 1979
- E-B Wilson Award, American Society for Cell Biology, 1982
- Duncan Graham Award, Royal College of Physicians and Surgeons of Canada, 1986
- Centennial Award, American Association of Anatomists, 1979
- Prix Marie-Victorin, Quebec Province, 1992

=== Medals ===
- Flavelle Medal, Royal Society of Canada, 1961
- Medal Léo-Pariseau, «Assoc. Canadienne Française pour l'Avancement des Sciences», 1962
- McLaughlin Medal, Royal Society of Canada, 1983
- George Gomori Medal, Histochemical Society, 1988

=== Other honours ===
- 1951 – Fellow of the Royal Society of Canada
- 1965 – Fellow of the Royal Society, London, UK
- 1970 - American Academy of Arts and Sciences
- 1988 - Fellow of the Royal Microscopical Society, UK
- 1995 – Canadian Medical Hall of Fame
- 2000 – Companion, Order of Canada
- 2001 – Grand Officer, National Order of Quebec
