= Rémi Quirion =

Canadian scientist

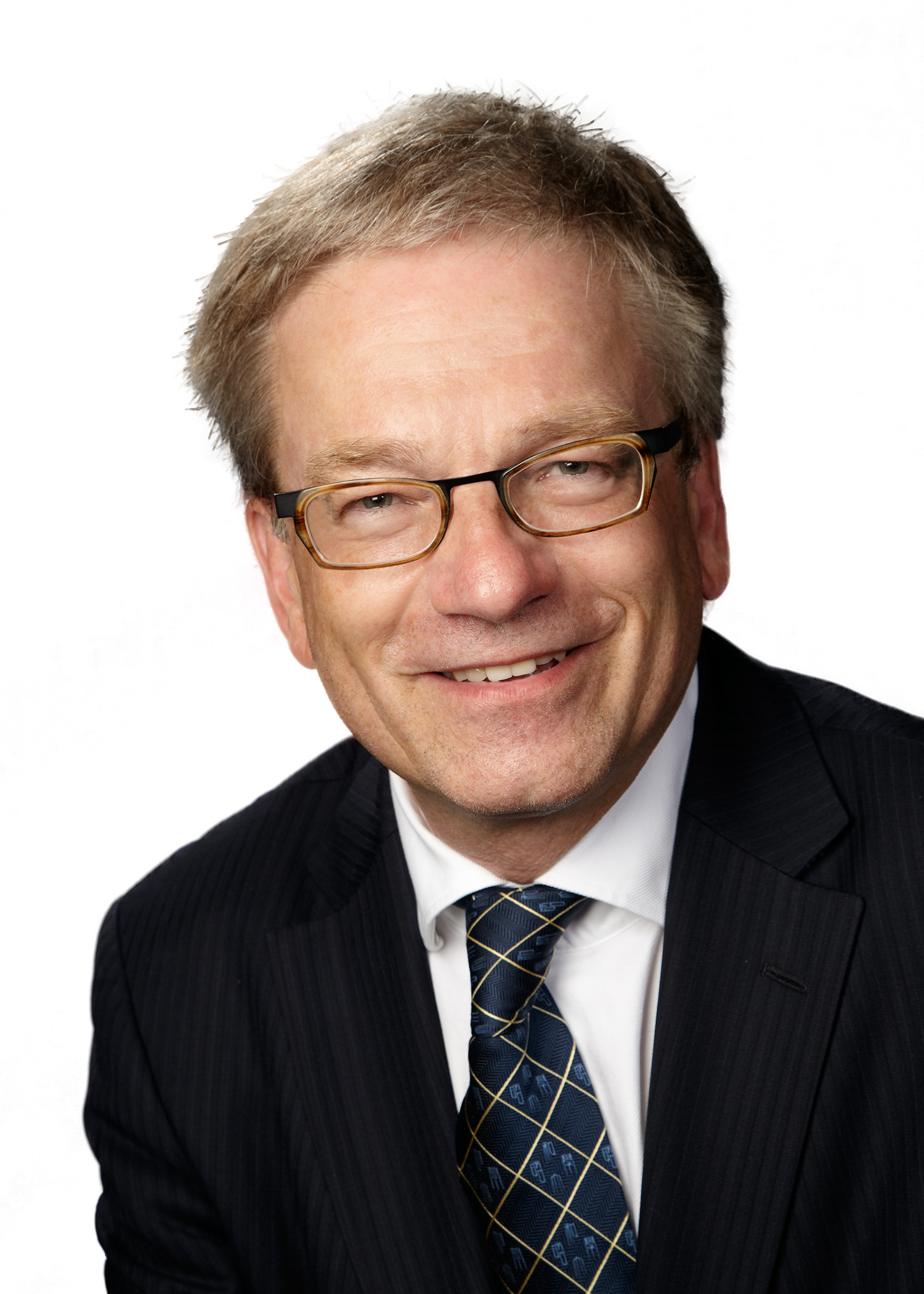
- Rémi Quirion in 2010
- Born: January 9, 1955 (age 71); Lac-Drolet, Quebec, Canada
- Education: Université de Sherbrooke (Ph.D., 1980)
- Known for: First Chief Scientist of Quebec
- Awards: Knight of the National Order of Quebec (1993); Prix Wilder-Penfield (2004); Officer of the Order of Canada (2006); Queen Elizabeth II Diamond Jubilee Medal; Léo-Pariseau Prize (1997); Prix Michel-Sarrazin (2007)
- Scientific career
- Fields: Neuroscience, Psychiatry
- Workplaces: McGill University, Douglas Mental Health University Institute

Rémi Quirion, OC, CQ, MSRC (born January 9, 1955) is a Canadian scientist. He is the first Chief Scientist of Quebec, a role he served in from 2011 to 2026.

Born in Lac-Drolet, Quebec, Quirion received a Ph.D. from Université de Sherbrooke in 1980. He was a Professor of Psychiatry at McGill University and Scientific Director of the Douglas Hospital Research Centre.

== Honours ==
In 1993, he was made a Knight of the National Order of Quebec. In 2004, he was awarded the Government of Quebec's Prix Wilder-Penfield. In 2006, he was made an Officer of the Order of Canada. He is also a recipient of the Queen Elizabeth II Diamond Jubilee Medal. In 1997, he was awarded the Léo-Pariseau Prize and the Prix Michel-Sarrazin in 2007.
