= Jean Davignon =

- Born: July 29, 1935; Montreal, Quebec
- Died: August 15, 2021
- Education: Université de Montréal; McGill University

Jean Davignon, OC GOQ FRSC (born July 29, 1935) is a Canadian physician, medical researcher, and academic.

Born in Montreal, Quebec, he received his Doctor of Medicine from the Université de Montréal in 1958 and a Master of Science degree in 1960 from McGill University.

His research has focused on hyperlipidemia and atherosclerosis. He is the Director of the Hyperlipidemia and Atherosclerosis Research Group of the Institut de recherches cliniques de Montréal (IRCM). He is a professor of the Faculty of Medicine at the Université de Montréal and adjunct professor of the Department of Experimental Medicine at McGill University. He is the co-founder of the Canadian Atherosclerosis Society and the Canadian Association for Familial Hypercholesterolemia.

In 1995, he was made an Officer of the Order of Canada, Canada's highest civilian honour. In 2006, he was made a Grand Officer of the National Order of Quebec. In 2000, he was awarded the Quebec Government's Prix Wilder-Penfield. In 1995, he was made a Fellow of the Royal Society of Canada. Davignon died August 15, 2021.
