= Circulation Research =

- Discipline: Cardiology, vascular systems
- Language: English
- Edited by: Jane E. Freedman

Publication details
- History: 1953–present
- Publisher: Lippincott Williams & Wilkins
- Frequency: Biweekly
- Impact factor: 20.3 (2023)

Standard abbreviations
- ISO 4: Circ. Res.

Indexing
- CODEN: CIRUAL
- ISSN: 0009-7330 (print); 1524-4571 (web)
- LCCN: 56003239
- OCLC no.: 856122

Links
- Journal homepage; Online access; Online archive

Circulation Research is a biweekly peer-reviewed medical journal published by Lippincott Williams & Wilkins. It is the official journal of the American Heart Association and its Council on Basic Cardiovascular Sciences. The journal covers research on all aspects of the cardiovascular system.

== History ==
The journal was established in 1953 by Carl J. Wiggers. The following people have been editor-in-chief:

- Carl J. Wiggers (January 1953 – December 1957)
- Carl F. Schmidt (January 1958 – December 1962)
- Eugene M. Landis (January 1963 – June 1966)
- Julius H. Comroe, Jr. (July 1966 – December 1970)
- Robert M. Berne (January 1971 – December 1975)
- Brian F. Hoffman (January 1976 – June 1981)
- Francis Abboud (July 1981 – June 1986)
- Harry A Fozzard (July 1986 – July 1991)
- Stephen F. Vatner (July 1991 – June 1999)
- Eduardo Marbán (July 1999 – June 2009)
- Roberto Bolli (July 2009 – March 2019)
- Joseph Loscalzo (March 2019 – June 2019)
- Jane E. Freedman (July 2019 – present)

== Abstracting and indexing ==
This journal is abstracted and indexed in:

- Science Citation Index
- BIOSIS Previews
- Current Contents/Life Sciences
- CAB Abstracts
- Chemical Abstracts
- Index Medicus/MEDLINE/PubMed
- Embase
- International Aerospace Abstracts

According to the Journal Citation Reports, the journal has a 2018 impact factor of 15.862.
