= André Bandrauk =

Canadian chemist and academic

André Dieter Bandrauk OC FRSC FCIC (born 20 May 1941) is a Canadian chemist and distinguished academic who is a professor of Theoretical chemistry at the University of Sherbrooke in Montreal.

Born in war-time Berlin, Bandrauk immigrated to Canada with his family in 1951 and has been with the University of Sherbrooke since 1971.

Bandrauk was awarded the status of Fellow in the American Physical Society, after they were nominated by their Division of Atomic, Molecular & Optical Physics in 2007, for "pioneering theoretical contributions to elucidating intense laser interactions with molecules, including predictions of the existence of new molecules and of enhanced molecular ionization in intense laser fields, and of the usefulness of chirped pulses to control photochemical processes."

He was appointed an Officer of the Order of Canada in 2012.

== See also ==
- List of fellows of the American Physical Society (1998–2010)
