= Tbx18 transduction =

Tbx18 transduction is a method of turning on genes in heart muscle cells as a treatment for certain cardiac arrhythmias. Currently this therapy is in the very early stages of experimentation, having only been applied to rodents. Before this treatment can be used in humans, successful tests on larger animals need to be completed followed by human clinical trials. This treatment is one of the many forms of gene therapy that are currently being researched for use in different diseases.

Tbx18 gene therapy is aimed at treating a group of arrhythmias known as sick sinus syndrome. In a healthy heart, sinoatrial (SA) nodal cells act as the heart’s pacemaker and cause the heart to beat in a regular rhythm. Approximately 10 thousand of the 10 billion cells in the heart are SA nodal cells. Although they make up a relatively small portion of the heart SA node cells play a crucial role in the heart’s function. The problem in sick sinus syndrome is that the SA node is not functioning properly and is causing an irregular heartbeat. Currently the treatment for sick sinus syndrome is to remove the SA nodal cells that are not functioning properly (?) and to implant an electronic pacemaker to maintain a regular rhythm.

The Tbx18 gene is required for development of pacemaker cells in the heart during fetal development but is normally not functional after birth. Expression of Tbx18 after birth requires adenovirus vectors to deliver the gene into the atrial myocytes. Tbx18 transduction converts atrial muscle cells into SA node cells that initiate the heartbeat. An engineered virus carrying the Tbx18 gene is injected into animals and infects atrial muscle cells. Inside atrial muscle cells the Tbx18 gene is expressed. Tbx18 turns on genes that drive SA node cell development, simultaneously turning off genes that create atrial muscle cells. Tbx18 gene therapy has been successful in rodent hearts, converting atrial muscle cells into SA node cells by expression of the Tbx18 transcription factor. Tbx18 expression in atrial myocytes was shown to convert them into functional SA nodal cells in an experiment done in rodents. These converted SA node cells are able to respond to the nervous system, allowing the heart to be regulated as normal.

Adenoviral TBX18 gene transfer could create biological pacemaker activity in vivo in a large-animal model of complete heart block. Biological pacemaker activity, originating from the intramyocardial injection site, was evident in TBX18-transduced animals starting at day 2 and persisted for the duration of the study (14 days) with minimal backup electronic pacemaker use. Relative to controls transduced with a reporter gene, TBX18-transduced animals exhibited enhanced autonomic responses and physiologically superior chronotropic support of physical activity. Induced sinoatrial node cells could be identified by their distinctive morphology at the site of injection in TBX18-transduced animals, but not in controls. No local or systemic safety concerns arose. Thus, minimally invasive TBX18 gene transfer creates physiologically relevant pacemaker activity in complete heart block, providing evidence for therapeutic somatic reprogramming in a clinically relevant disease model.

The currently used electronic pacemakers have drawbacks such as equipment malfunction, limited battery life, lack of nervous system regulation, and risks associated with implantation of the device in one’s chest. Creation of a biological pacemaker could prove to be a feasible alternative that eliminates some of the problems associated with electronic pacemakers. Various gene and cell-based approaches of creating a biological pacemaker have been looked at over the last few years. The method of turning on Tbx18 genes in heart muscle cells is a new method being researched that, so far, has shown promise for being effective.
