= Michel Chrétien =

Canadian medical researcher

Michel Chrétien OC GOQ FRS FRSC
- Born: March 26, 1936 (age 89); Shawinigan, Quebec, Canada
- Known for: γ-lipotropin, Prohormone theory
- Awards: Order of Canada; National Order of Quebec

Michel Chrétien OC GOQ FRS FRSC (born March 26, 1936) is a Canadian medical researcher specializing in neuroendocrinology research at the Institut de recherches cliniques de Montréal, or Clinical Research Institute of Montreal, (IRCM). He is a younger brother of former Canadian prime minister, Jean Chrétien.

== Early life and education ==
Born in Shawinigan, Quebec. He is the brother of Jean Chrétien, who was Prime Minister of Canada from 1993 to 2003. He received a Bachelor of Arts degree from the Séminaire de Joliette in 1955, a M.D. from the Université de Montréal in 1960, and a Master of Science in Experimental Medicine from McGill University in 1962. He did post-graduate studies from 1962 to 1964 at Harvard University and from 1964 to 1967 at the University of California, Berkeley and University of California, San Francisco.

== Career ==
In 1967, Chrétien opened a laboratory on polypeptide hormones at the Clinical Research Institute of Montreal (CRIM), where he would remain until 1999.

He was an Associate Member, Experimental Medicine at McGill University from 1969 to 1999. In 1999 he was scientific director and CEO of the Loeb Health Research Institute at the Ottawa Civic Hospital.

Chrétien was a Professor of Medicine in the Faculty of Medicine at the Université de Montréal from 1975 to 1999. He was Chief of Endocrinology at Hôtel-Dieu de Montréal. In 1998, he was appointed a Professor, Department of Medicine, Faculty of Medicine, University of Ottawa. In 2006, he was appointed Senior Scientist of Hormone, Growth and Development at the Ottawa Health Research Institute.

He created Quebec’s first protein chemistry laboratory at IRCM in 1967 and continued to lead influential research programs for decades.

== Research ==
His research proposed that peptide hormones are produced from large precursor proteins. In 1967, Chrétien first articulated the prohormone theory, proposing that peptide hormones are produced from larger precursors, a paradigm later widely confirmed and foundational for modern endocrinology.

In 1976, his team discovered human β-endorphin, advancing understanding of endogenous opioid systems in pain and stress biology.

In 1990, Chrétien and collaborators identified the family of proprotein convertases (PCs/PCSK1–9), endoproteases that activate many precursor proteins and hormones, helping to establish a field often termed “functional endoproteolysis.”

A loss-of-function PCSK9 variant characterized in French-Canadian families by Chrétien’s group is associated with markedly low LDL cholesterol and cardioprotection, work that helped validate PCSK9 as a therapeutic target.

Chrétien’s prohormone/convertase research has had broad clinical impact, informing therapies and biological understanding in diabetes, obesity, dyslipidemia, atherosclerosis, cancer, opiate use disorders, and Alzheimer’s disease.

Between 1981 and 1990, he ranked among the world’s most-cited scientists (reported as seventh globally) reflecting the reach of his contributions.

== Honours ==
In 1986, he was made an Officer of the Order of Canada in recognition for being "at the forefront of Canadian scientific research and an international leader in the field of neuroendocrinology". In 1994, he was made an Officer of the National Order of Quebec and promoted to the grade of Grand Officer on June 16, 2022. In 2004, he was made a Chevalier of the Légion d'honneur and was promoted to Officer in 2011. In 1981, he was made a Fellow of the Royal Society of Canada. In 1996, he was made a Fellow of the American Association for the Advancement of Science. He has received honorary degrees from University of Liège (1980), Paris Descartes University (1992), Laurentian University (1996), University of Guelph (1999), and Memorial University of Newfoundland (2000). In 2009, he was elected a Fellow of the Royal Society In 2017 he was made a member of the Canadian Medical Hall of Fame.
