= Yolande Grisé =

Canadian writer

Yolande Grise
- Born: 1944 (age 81–82)
- Education: Sorbonne
- Occupation: History professor
- Title: President of the Royal Society of Canada (2011–2013)
- Honours: Member of the Royal Society of Canada (1996) Knight of the Order of the Pleiade (1998) Member of the Order of Canada (2015)

Yolande Grisé (born 1944) is a Canadian history professor at the University of Ottawa and writer who served as the President of the Royal Society of Canada from 2011 to 2013. In 1982, she wrote the book Le suicide dans la Rome antique. In 2015, she was awarded the a membership into the Order of Canada for her efforts and contributions to the promotion of French language and culture in Canada, and to the advancement of knowledge and research as president of the Royal Society of Canada.

== Publications ==
- Le suicide dans la Rome antique (1982)

== Honors ==
- 1996 – Member of the Royal Society of Canada
- 1998 – Member of the Order of the Pleiade
- 2015 – Member of the Order of Canada
