= Jacques Genest =

- Born: May 29, 1919; Montreal, Quebec
- Died: January 5, 2018 (aged 98)
- Education: University of Montreal (M.D.)

Jacques Genest CC GOQ FRSC (May 29, 1919 – January 5, 2018) was a Canadian physician and scientist. He founded the Institut de recherches cliniques de Montréal (IRCM) and was an emeritus professor at Université de Montréal and a professor at McGill University. Genest was best known for founding and leading several organizations related to clinical research in Québec and for his work on arterial hypertension.

== Life and career ==
Born in Montreal, Quebec, Genest received his medical degree from the University of Montreal. He completed his residency in internal medicine and pathology at the Hôpital Hôtel-Dieu de Montréal before heading to Johns Hopkins in Baltimore, Maryland for a research fellowship. He was then a research associate and assistant physician at the Rockefeller Institute in New York City, which later awarded him an honorary degree in 1986.

Upon returning to Quebec, he was asked by the provincial government to perform a study of the state of research in the province. Following his visits to major universities and research institutions of the United States and Europe, he concluded that Québec lagged behind in this sector. He therefore founded the first department of clinical research at Hôtel-Dieu de Montréal in 1952. Though he had the confidence on the administration, this move was poorly received by his colleagues, who disapproved of a physician being salaried and freed from clinical tasks to devote himself to the study of hypertension. However, the lack of financing and of laboratory space complicated the growth of the department. In 1955 the department was recognized by the Royal College of Physicians and Surgeons of Canada for basic science training, leading to an improvement in his colleagues' opinions. The department became the only place offering both clinical and research education for physicians. Jacques Genest acceded to the presidency of the medical council of Hôtel-Dieu in 1958. Furthermore, he created the Club de Recherches Cliniques du Québec (CRCQ), a place for discourse between francophone researchers.

Now more firmly established, the department recruited dozens of researchers between 1952 and 1967. The department established close ties with J.S.L. Browne, director of the department of Investigative Medicine at McGill University, who offered interns the opportunity to round out their clinical studies with a solid theoretical foundation. In 1964, Jacques Genest was named director of the Department of Medicine of the Faculty of Medicine of the University of Montréal. He continued at the same time to work towards the elaboration of a council of medical research in Québec which would permit governmental finance of research. Indeed, today the Fonds de la recherche en santé du Québec (FRSQ) awards scholarships and grants to researchers in the health sciences. Also in 1964, McGill offered Genest the post of Dean of the Faculty of Medicine. This position offered him support sufficient to lay the cornerstone for a research institute. With the help of noted lawyer Marcel Piché, they founded the Claude Bernard Medical Center, which is known today as the Institut de recherches cliniques de Montréal (IRCM). The provincial minister of health Alphonse Couturier allocated critical funds towards the foundation of this institution. Genest guided this foundation from 1967 through 1984. He also contributed to the establishment of a center for the study of bioethics within the IRCM.

He died on 5 January 2018 at the age of 98.

== Scientific research ==
His interests in arterial hypertension led him to uncover the role of sodium, aldosterone, and angiotensin II in the renin-angiotensin system. He established tests for renin activity in plasma, which were important for the diagnosis of renovascular hypertension and as a predictor of the efficacy of surgical intervention. Additionally, he worked on the natriuretic factor present in heart atria.

== Honours ==
- In 1963, he was awarded the Gairdner Foundation International Award.
- In 1967, he was made a Companion of the Order of Canada.
- In 1968, he was awarded the Royal Society of Canada's Flavelle Medal.
- In 1978, he was awarded the Loyola Medal by Concordia University.
- In 1991, he was made a Grand Officer of the National Order of Quebec.
- In 1994, he was inducted into the Canadian Medical Hall of Fame.
- In 1996, he was awarded the Québec government's Prix Armand-Frappier.
