= Institut de recherches cliniques de Montréal =

Canadian research institute

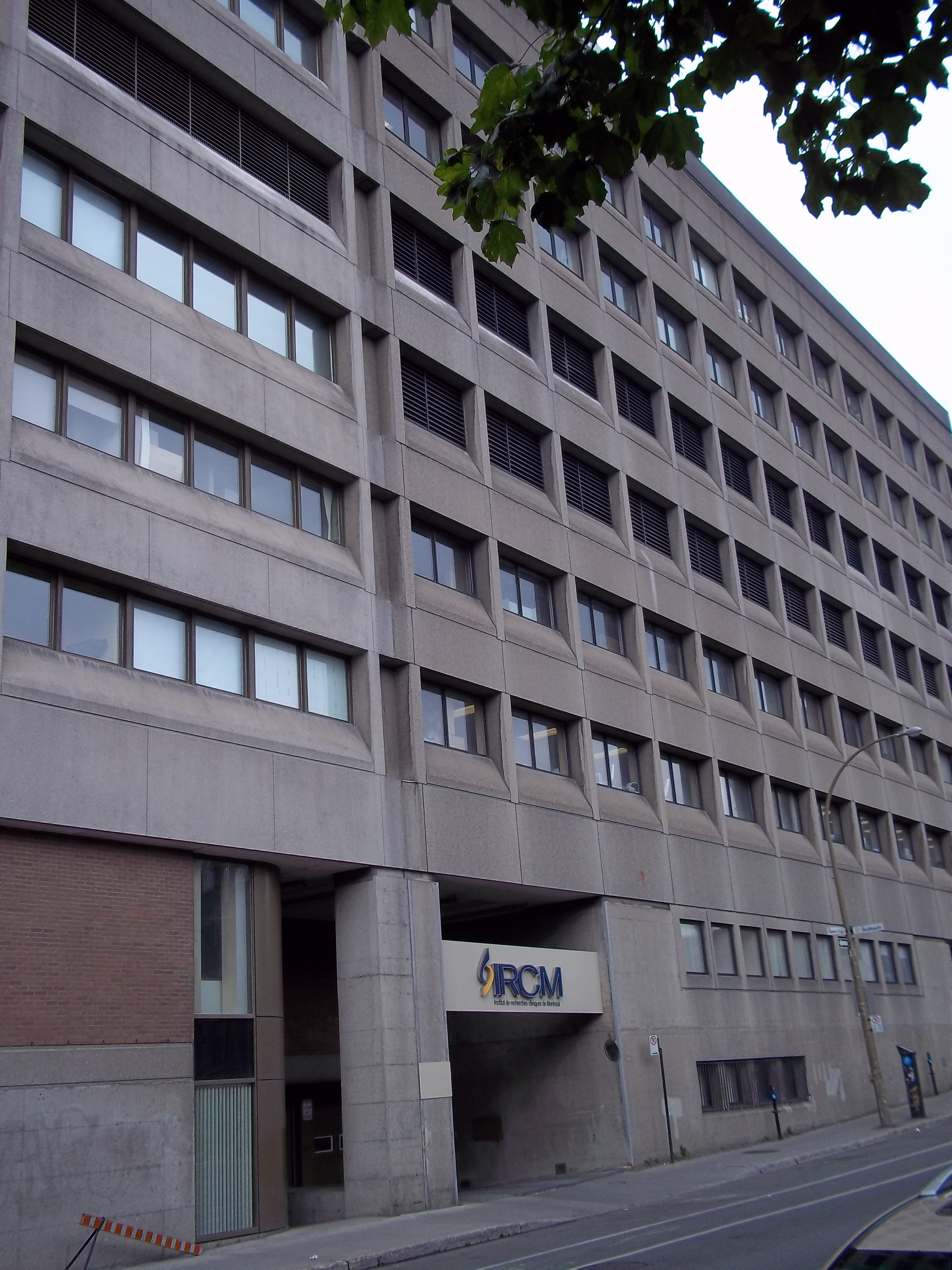
IRCM en juin 2011.

Institut de recherches cliniques de Montréal (IRCM), (also known, in English, as Montreal Clinical Research Institute), is a medical research institute affiliated with Université de Montréal. Its work focuses mainly on cellular biology, molecular biology, genetics, developmental biology, and proteomics. Its aim is to understand the causes of illnesses and develop new therapeutic solutions or cures.

== History ==
The institute was established in 1967 by Dr. Jacques Genest who had earlier in 1952 established the first clinical research department at Hôtel-Dieu de Montréal hospital and had become the head of the Faculty of Medicine at McGill University in 1964.

With lawyer Marcel Piché, Genest founded Centre médical Claude-Bernard in 1965, renamed Institut de diagnostic et de recherches cliniques de Montréal and further changed to Institut de recherches cliniques de Montréal its present name in 1986. Keeping its links with Hôtel-Dieu de Montréal, the Institute signed in December 1964 a contract of affiliation with the hospital for 25 years, stipulating that clinicians-researchers of the institute would be members in the medical staff of Hôtel-Dieu, ensuring they would have access to the hospital's patients and conducting laboratory tests for the hospital.

The construction of the main headquarters for the institute started in January 1966 inaugurated in the presence of Quebec Health Minister Eric Kierans and in 1967, IRCM became affiliated to Université de Montréal, providing additional courses and later recruitment to some of the university's graduates.

In 1976, Centre de bioéthique (Center of Bioethics) was founded by Dr. David J. Roy.

In 1992, IRCM celebrated its 25th year and a new wing was inaugurated (named bloc Basset).

In 2003, a further expansion and renovation project was launched. On 24 March 2006, the new 26,500 meter square premises and laboratories were inaugurated in the presence of Raymond Bachand, Quebec Minister of Economic Development, Innovation and Export.

Directors

- 1967-1984: Jacques Genest (also founder)
- 1984-1994: Michel Chrétien
- 1994-2004: Yvan Guindon
- 2004-2006: Louis-Gilles Durand
- 2006-2019: Tarik Möröy
- 2019–2021: Max Fehlmann
- 2021–present: Jean-François Côté

Financing

IRCM is a non-profit organism has its own La Fondation de l'IRCM. It also gets financing from various sources including the Economic Development, Innovation and Exports Ministry of Québec (MDEIE), from Fonds de la recherche en santé du Québec (FRSQ) and Canadian national organizations. The centre also gets support from the private sector and companies and individuals. It also organizes annual campaigns and various activities for financing

== Awards ==
The Institute awards the Marcel-Piché Prize every two years to an IRCM researcher in recognition of their research and contribution to the growth and outreach of the Institute and the IRCM Merit Award annually to an individual who plays an exceptional role in the development of the biomedical sciences.
