= Rutherford Memorial Medal =

The Rutherford Memorial Medal is an award for research in the fields of physics and chemistry by the Royal Society of Canada. It was dedicated to the memory of Ernest Rutherford. It is awarded once for physics and once for chemistry each year, "for outstanding research", when there is a suitable candidate.

== Recipients ==
Source: Royal Society of Canada

=== Chemistry ===
- 2025 : Adam Shuhendler
- 2024 : Rylan Lundgren
- 2023 : Emily Cranston
- 2022 : Aiping Yu
- 2021 : Fiorenzo Vetrone
- 2020 : Erin Johnson
- 2019 : Dwight Seferos
- 2018 : Tomislav Friscic
- 2017 : Zhongwei Chen
- 2016 : Curtis P. Berlinguette
- 2015 : Robert Campbell
- 2014 : Paul Ayers
- 2013 : Mark J. Maclachlan
- 2012 : John Paul Pezacki
- 2011 : Federico Rosei
- 2010 : Andrei Yudin
- 2009 : Dennis Hall and Keith Fagnou (posthumously)
- 2008 : Peter Tieleman
- 2007 : Gregory D. Scholes
- 2006 : Molly Shoichet
- 2005 : Jillian Buriak
- 2004 : Andrew Woolley
- 2003 : Liang Li
- 2002 : André B. Charette
- 2001 : Warren Piers
- 2000 : Suning Wang
- 1999 : Daniel D. M. Wayner
- 1998 : Benoît Roux
- 1997 : R. J. Dwayne Miller
- 1996 : Ian Manners
- 1995 : Todd B. Marder
- 1994 : Mark Lautens
- 1993 : Stephen G. Withers
- 1992 : James D. Wuest
- 1991 : Robert H. Morris
- 1990 : Michael D. Fryzuk
- 1989 : Peter Hackett
- 1988 : Raymond Andersen
- 1987 : Grenfell N. Patey
- 1986 : David Griller
- 1985 : Stephen C. Wallace
- 1984 : Robert J. LeRoy
- 1983 : Juan C. Scaiano
- 1982 : Geoffrey Ozin
- 1981 : Diethard K. Böhme
- 1980 : G. Michael Bancroft

=== Physics ===
- 2025 : Julie Hlavacek-Larrondo
- 2024 : Renée Hložek
- 2023 : Ebrahim Karimi
- 2022 : Daryl Haggard
- 2021 : Jo Bovy
- 2020 : Jens Dilling
- 2019 : Paul François
- 2018 : Alexandre Blais
- 2017 : Ingrid Stairs
- 2016 : François Légaré
- 2015 : Aashish Clerk
- 2014 : Sara Ellison
- 2013 : Ray Jayawardhana
- 2012 : Guy Moore
- 2011 : Freddy A. Cachazo
- 2010 : Kari Dalnoki-Veress
- 2009 : Barth Netterfield
- 2007 : Victoria Michelle Kaspi
- 2006 : Aephraim M. Steinberg
- 2005 : Peter Grütter
- 2004 : Sajeev John
- 2003 : Misha Ivanov
- 2002 : Christopher Thompson
- 2001 : Matthew W. Choptuik
- 2000 : Jerry X. Mitrovica
- 1999 : Robert A. Wolkow
- 1998 : Martin Grant
- 1997 : Nicholas Kaiser
- 1996 : Pekka K. Sinervo
- 1995 : David B. MacFarlane
- 1994 : Michael L.W. Thewalt
- 1993 : John W. Hepburn
- 1992 : François Wesemael
- 1991 : Ian K. Affleck
- 1990 : Scott Tremaine
- 1989 : Nathan Isgur
- 1988 : Claude Leroy
- 1987 : A. John Berlinsky
- 1986 : William J.L. Buyers
- 1985 : John J. Simpson
- 1984 : Penny G. Estabrooks
- 1983 : David J. Rowe
- 1982 : William G. Unruh
- 1981 : John C. Hardy
- 1980 : Malcolm J. Stott

== See also ==
- List of chemistry awards
- List of physics awards
- List of prizes named after people
