= Comet Wilson =

Comet Wilson or Wilson's Comet, may refer to any of the comets discovered by the following people below:

== Albert George Wilson ==
American astronomer Albert G. Wilson co-discovered three comets with Robert G. Harrington between 1949 and 1952:

- 107P/Wilson–Harrington, an active asteroid also known as 4015 Wilson–Harrington
- C/1951 P1 (Wilson–Harrington)
- D/1952 B1 (Harrington–Wilson), a lost comet

== A. Steward Wilson ==
- C/1961 O1 (Wilson–Hubbard), discovered by American air navigator A. Steward Wilson in 1961

== Christine D. Wilson ==
- C/1986 P1 (Wilson), discovered by Canadian–American physicist Christine D. Wilson in 1986
