= Renée Hložek =

South African cosmologist

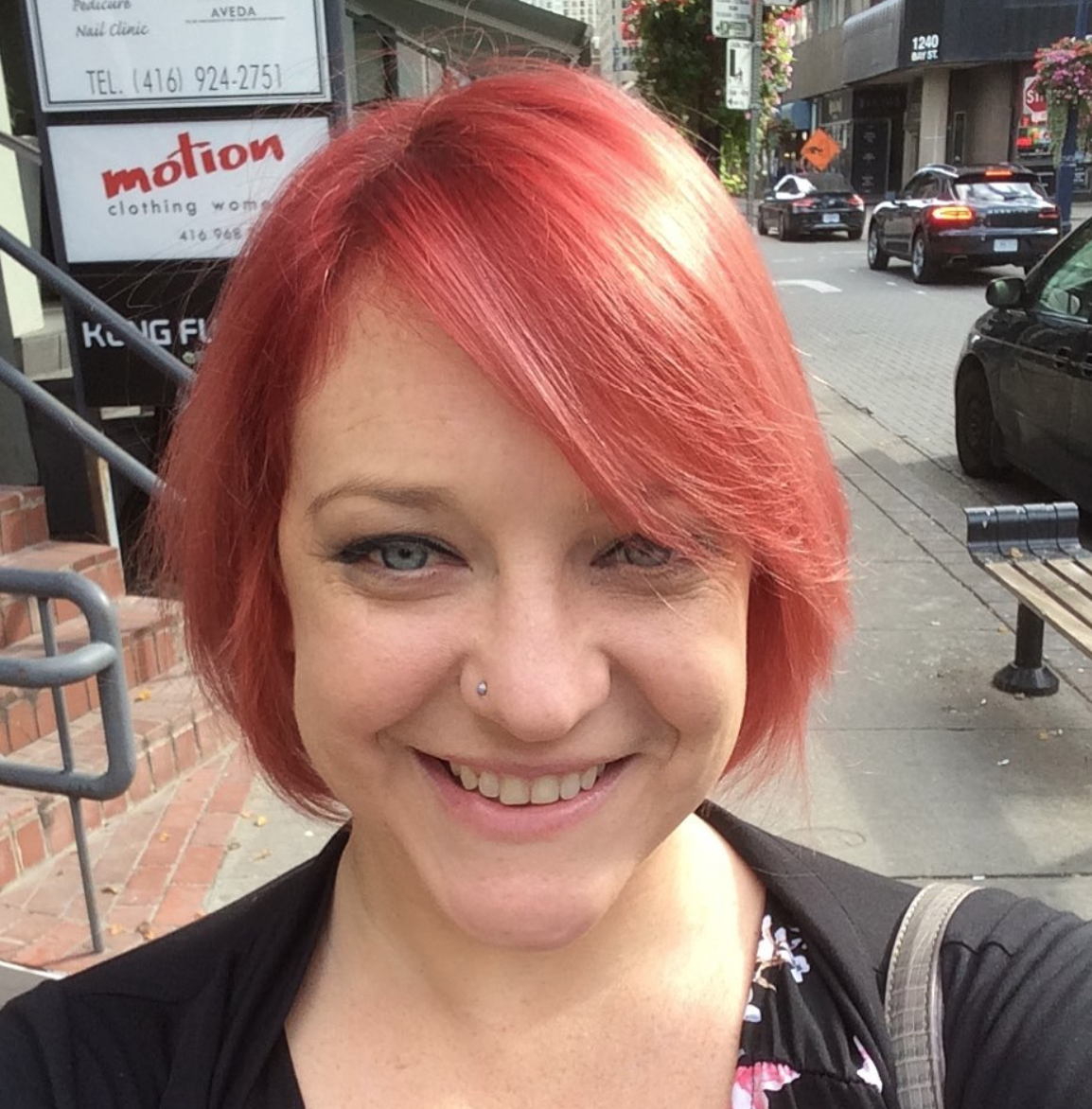
- Renée Hložek in Toronto, October 2019
- Born: 15 November 1983 (age 42)
- Education: University of Cape Town University of Pretoria University of Oxford
- Scientific career
- Workplaces: University of Toronto; Princeton University
- Thesis: Probing the early universe and dark energy with multi-epoch cosmological data
- Doctoral advisor: Jo Dunkley
- Website: https://www.reneehlozek.com

Renée Hložek (born 15 November 1983) is a South African cosmologist and Associate Professor of Astronomy & Astrophysics at the Dunlap Institute for Astronomy & Astrophysics at the University of Toronto. Her research focuses on theoretical and observational cosmology, including measurements of the cosmic microwave background, constraints on axion dark matter, Type Ia supernova cosmology, and the development of statistical methods for large astronomical surveys. She is a member of the Atacama Cosmology Telescope collaboration and the Simons Observatory, and serves as Spokesperson for the Vera C. Rubin Observatory Dark Energy Science Collaboration (DESC).Hložek is bisexual.

Hložek's research includes using cosmic microwave background data to constrain ultralight axion dark matter models, work that is among her most highly cited. She is also a member of the Simons Observatory collaboration. As part of her work on supernova cosmology with the Vera C. Rubin Observatory, she co-led the Photometric LSST Astronomical Time-series Classification Challenge (PLAsTiCC), a community data challenge for photometric supernova classification.

== Early life and education ==
Hložek studied mathematics at the University of Pretoria and the University of Cape Town graduating in 2008. During her undergraduate studies she worked on dark energy. She completed her PhD at the University of Oxford as a Rhodes Scholar in 2011. Her thesis, "Probing the early universe and Dark Energy with multi-epoch cosmological data", used the Atacama Cosmology Telescope and Sloan Digital Sky Survey. Her doctoral advisor was Jo Dunkley. During her time at Oxford, she appeared on Chris Lintott's Pub Astronomy podcast and 365 Days of Astronomy.

== Research and career ==
After her PhD Hložek joined Princeton University as a Lyman Spitzer Jr. Postdoctoral Research Fellow. At Princeton University she prepared for the polarisation-sensitive Atacama Cosmology Telescope. In 2012 she was appointed a Spitzer-Cotsen Fellow at Princeton University. At Princeton she took part in a prison teaching initiative, and formed the Hope-Princeton exchange to bring young black women into Princeton's astronomy departments. She took part in the Story Collider. In 2013 she took part in the Science Train started by Lucianne Walkowicz at Princeton, where she took to the New York City Subway to talk to the public about astronomy.

She joined the Dunlap Institute for Astronomy & Astrophysics in 2016. She continues to work with the polarisation instrument on the Atacama Cosmology Telescope, alongside data from Planck and Wilkinson Microwave Anisotropy Probe and BICEP and Keck Array. She looks to classify radio transient signals using the Algonquin 46m radio telescope. She has worked with the Perimeter Institute for Theoretical Physics. In 2017 she took part in the Canadian Institute for Advanced Research Untangling the Cosmos event. In 2020 she was named a CIFAR Azrieli Global Scholar in 2019, awarded a Sloan Research Fellowship, and the Rutherford Memorial Medal in 2024. She was the recipient of the Arthur B. McDonald Fellowship in 2025. She is the Spokesperson for the Vera C. Rubin Dark Energy Science Collaboration (DESC).

Hložek was named a TED Fellow in 2012 and a Senior Fellow in 2014, however she resigned the fellowship in 2024. Her contribution to TEDed "The death of the universe" has been viewed 1.1 Million times. She has spoken at several TED events, including the 2014 TED conference in Vancouver. She takes part in several activities to improve gender balance in science. She co-founded the Hope Scholarship to support South African women in STEM, and serves as a member of the Schmidt Science Fellows Academic Council.

== Awards and honours ==
- Rhodes Scholarship, University of Oxford, 2008
- TED Fellow, 2012; Senior Fellow, 2014
- CIFAR Azrieli Global Scholar, 2019
- Sloan Research Fellowship, 2020
- McLean Award, University of Toronto
- Harvey B. Richer Gold Medal for Early Career Research in Astronomy, Canadian Astronomical Society
- Rutherford Memorial Medal in Physics, Royal Society of Canada, 2024
- Arthur B. McDonald Fellowship, Natural Sciences and Engineering Research Council of Canada, 2025
