= Neelima Sehgal =

American cosmologist

Neelima Sehgal is an American cosmologist whose research studies the cosmic microwave background for clues to the origin of the universe and the distribution of particles, dark matter, and dark energy in the early universe. She is a professor in the Physics and Astronomy Department at Stony Brook University.

== Education and career ==
Sehgal is originally from Manhattan. After secondary schooling at the Dalton School in New York, she did her undergraduate studies at Yale University. There, she double majored in physics and mathematics, graduating in 1999. She started her graduate studies at Rutgers University focusing on string theory, but switched to cosmology before completing her Ph.D. in 2008. Her dissertation, Measuring the growth of structure with multi-wavelength surveys of galaxy clusters, was supervised by John P. Hughes.

After postdoctoral research at Stanford University, the SLAC National Accelerator Laboratory, and Princeton University, she joined Stony Brook University as an assistant professor in 2012. She is part of the Atacama Cosmology Telescope collaboration, and has used data from the Atacama Cosmology Telescope to produce new images of the cosmic microwave background, confirming the age of the universe.

== Recognition ==
Sehgal was named as a Fellow of the American Physical Society (APS) in 2025, after a nomination from the APS Division of Astrophysics, "for pioneering work on the cosmic microwave background, especially for the conceptual development of a next-generation, high-resolution cosmic microwave background observatory".
