= Ebrahim Karimi =

Ebrahim Karimi may refer to:

- Ebrahim Karimi (physicist)
- Ebrahim Karimi (footballer)
