= Neb Duric =

Serbian-American astrophysicist (born 1955)

- Born: 1955 (age 70–71)
- Awards: Royal Astronomical Society of Canada Gold Medal

Nebojsa Duric (born 1955) is a Serbian-born American astrophysicist. He received his PhD in astrophysics in 1984 from the University of Toronto, where he earned the Royal Astronomical Society of Canada Gold Medal for academic excellence. After a postdoctoral position at the University of British Columbia he moved to University of New Mexico, Albuquerque, where he stayed for many years as a professor of physics and astronomy. He is a member of the American Astronomical Society and the Canadian Astronomical Society. He has co-authored over 100 scientific papers. He wrote a textbook "Advanced Astrophysics" published by Cambridge University Press in 2003.

In 2004 he left astrophysics to become a professor in the Department of Oncology, at Wayne State University. He later moved to the University of Rochester Medical Center, where he is a professor and the vice chair for research.
