= 4C+55.16 =

Seyfert 2 galaxy in the constellation Ursa Major

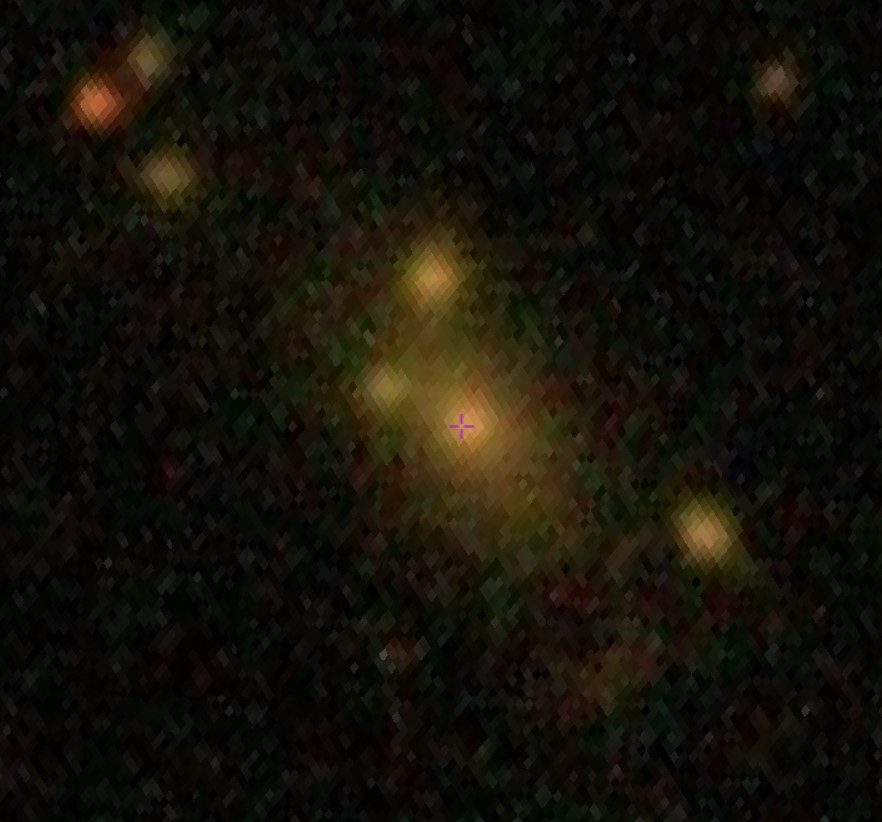
- 4C+55.16 captured by SDSS

Observation data (J2000 epoch)
- Constellation: Ursa Major
- Right ascension: 08^{h} 34^{m} 54.90^{s}
- Declination: +55° 34′ 21.07″
- Redshift: 0.241509
- Heliocentric radial velocity: 72,403 km/s
- Distance: 2.845 Gly (872.2 Mpc)
- Apparent magnitude (V): 19.45
- Apparent magnitude (B): 20.75
- Surface brightness: 18.4

Characteristics
- Type: BrClG, S3, E
- Size: ~442,000 ly (135.5 kpc) (estimated)
- Apparent size (V): 0.25' x 0.15'
- Notable features: Brightest cluster galaxy, radio galaxy

Other designations
- OGC 443, NVSS J083454+553421, PGC 2506893, OJ+552, DA 251, 2MASS J08345487+5534206, IRCF J083454.9+553421, TXS 0831+557, 6C B083104.6+554441, S4 0831+55

4C+55.16 is an elliptical galaxy, classified type E, located in Ursa Major. The galaxy lies about 2.84 billion light-years from Earth, which means given its apparent dimensions, 4C+55.16 is approximately 442,000 light-years across making it a type-cD galaxy. It is the brightest cluster galaxy (BCG) in a cluster of the same name.

== Characteristics ==
4C+55.16 has an active nucleus. It is classified as a Fanaroff-Riley Class I or FR-I radio galaxy producing a radio jet. 4C+55.16 contains a radio source, compact and powerful (1.1×10^{26} W Hz^{−1} sr^{−1} at 5 GHz) unlike two other radio galaxies, 3C 295 and Cygnus A. It is classified as a LINER galaxy.

== A further study of 4C+55.16 ==
4C+55.16 is located in the center of a cool core of galaxies. The galaxy is radio powerful (L_{R} = 8 Jy/beam at 1.4GHz), and showing signs of interaction with its surrounding intracluster medium (ICM). The hot ICM (T = 10^{7} − 10^{8} K) emits a strong X-ray emission through thermal bremsstrahlung, which cools this medium and causes it to sink down the gravitational well in the form cooling flows. As this accretes into 4C+55.16, the AGN in the center is fed, triggering its central supermassive black hole to produce large quantities of energy in radiation form and strong jetted outflows.

As cooling flow is injected, it completes the feedback cycle preventing a runaway cooling event. The jetted outflows then expands into large lobes against its internal pressure with the ICM. This process can be observed through the radio regime of electromagnetic spectrum, showing magnetized plasma emitted by the black hole or by X-ray radiation, which the lobes appear as cavities in the ICM like Cygnus A and NGC 1275. It is possible that the galaxy is optically disturbed by its companion, with a separation of 81 kpc.

Through combined deep Chandra images (100 ks) and 1.4 GHz Very Large Array observations, researchers were able to find evidence of multiple outbursts originating from its central core. This provides enough energy to offset the cooling process of the ICM (P_{bubbles} = 6.7 × 10^{44} erg/s).

Another study shows 4C+55.16 has an unusual intracluster iron distribution. From the 10 ks Chandra exposure, a study from Iwasawa et al. (2001), found that there was a large increase of metallicity which was at a radius of around 10 arcsec, going from half-solar to twice solar. This might be suggested by the plume-like structure which is located south-west side of the cluster.

Further studies showed that the X-ray spectrum of the plume is characterized by its metal abundance pattern of Type Ia supernovae, large ratios of Fe to α elements, with its iron metallicity highest at 7.9^{+24}_{−5.0} solar (90 per cent error). How the plume formed isn't clear.

Not to mention, 4C+55.16 has two X-ray cavities found on opposite sides of the radio core, discovered by Hlavacek-Larrondo et al. (2011). Such of these meant, is a key tracer of mechanical heating caused by its active galactic nucleus (AGN). The power generated by the AGN in 4C+ 55.16 has remained unchanged for over the half of the age of the universe (>Gyr at z ~ 0.8). Moreover, the detected X-ray cavities have powers of (0.8 - 5) x 10 erg and radii of ~ 17 kpc.

There is a surface brightness edge which is interpreted as cold fronts that are located south of the galaxy's center. A pair of radio lobes is also revealed in the southeast-northwest direction, coinciding with the X-ray cavities. On the VLBA scale, there is a resolved extended emission, well fitted by its two components consisting of a core and a jet. This is consistent with the images published by the European VLBI Network at 5 GHz, published by Whyborn et al. (1985). The northwest cavity is aligned with its radio jet, while the other is misaligned, hence important to note the importance of projection effects in the system where Ψ∥LOS ~ 60°.

The gas pressure at the center of a cooling flow for 4C+55.16, is P=nT≈107 cm^{−3} K. Through a cloud of length 10l_{1} pc at pressure 107P_{7} cm^{−3} K and temperature 104T_{4} K, it leads to a free-free absorption optical depth τ_{ff}≈0.6P2_{7}ν_{9}−2T_{4}7/2l_{1} at a frequency 109ν_{9} Hz. It is plausible it is due to absorption in the Hα emitting gas, close to the nucleus.
