= Jo Dunkley =

British astrophysicist

Jo Dunkley OBE FRS
- Jo Dunkley in 2026
- Born: Joanna Dunkley; 1979 or 1980 (age 46–47)
- Education: North London Collegiate School<Lbr />University of Cambridge (MSci); University of Oxford (DPhil)
- Partner: Faramerz Dabhoiwala
- Children: two
- Awards: New Horizons in Physics Prize (2020); Breakthrough Prize in Fundamental Physics (2017); Rosalind Franklin Award (2016); Royal Society Wolfson Research Merit Award (2015); Philip Leverhulme Prize (2015); Maxwell Medal and Prize (2013)
- Scientific career
- Fields: Cosmology cosmic microwave background Neutrinos
- Workplaces: Princeton University; University of Oxford
- Thesis: Modern methods for cosmological parameter estimation : beyond the adiabatic paradigm (2005)
- Doctoral advisor: Pedro G. Ferreira
- Notable students: Renée Hložek
- Website: physics.princeton.edu/~jdunkley

Joanna Dunkley OBE FRS is a British astrophysicist and Professor of Physics at Princeton University, New Jersey, United States. She works on the origin of the Universe and the Cosmic microwave background (CMB) using the Atacama Cosmology Telescope, the Simons Observatory and the Large Synoptic Survey Telescope (LSST).

== Education ==
Dunkley was educated at North London Collegiate School and the University of Cambridge, where she graduated in 2001 with a Master of Science (MSci) degree in Natural Sciences (Theoretical Physics). She was an undergraduate student of Trinity Hall, Cambridge. She moved to Oxford for postgraduate study where she was awarded a Doctor of Philosophy degree from the University of Oxford in 2005 for research supervised by astrophysicist Pedro G. Ferreira. She was a postgraduate student of Magdalen College, Oxford.

== Research and career ==
Her research is in cosmology, studying the chronology of the universe using the Atacama Cosmology Telescope, the Simons Observatory, and the Large Synoptic Survey Telescope (LSST).

After her DPhil, she joined Princeton University as a postdoctoral research fellow in 2006, working with David Spergel and Lyman Page on NASA’s Wilkinson Microwave Anisotropy Probe (WMAP). In an interview at Princeton in 2017, Spergel said she quickly "made major contributions to the analysis that led to the development of what we now think of as the standard model of cosmology." Soon after she began working with the European Space Agency (ESA) Planck satellite, which produced a higher-resolution view of the cosmic microwave background (CMB) compared to WMAP.

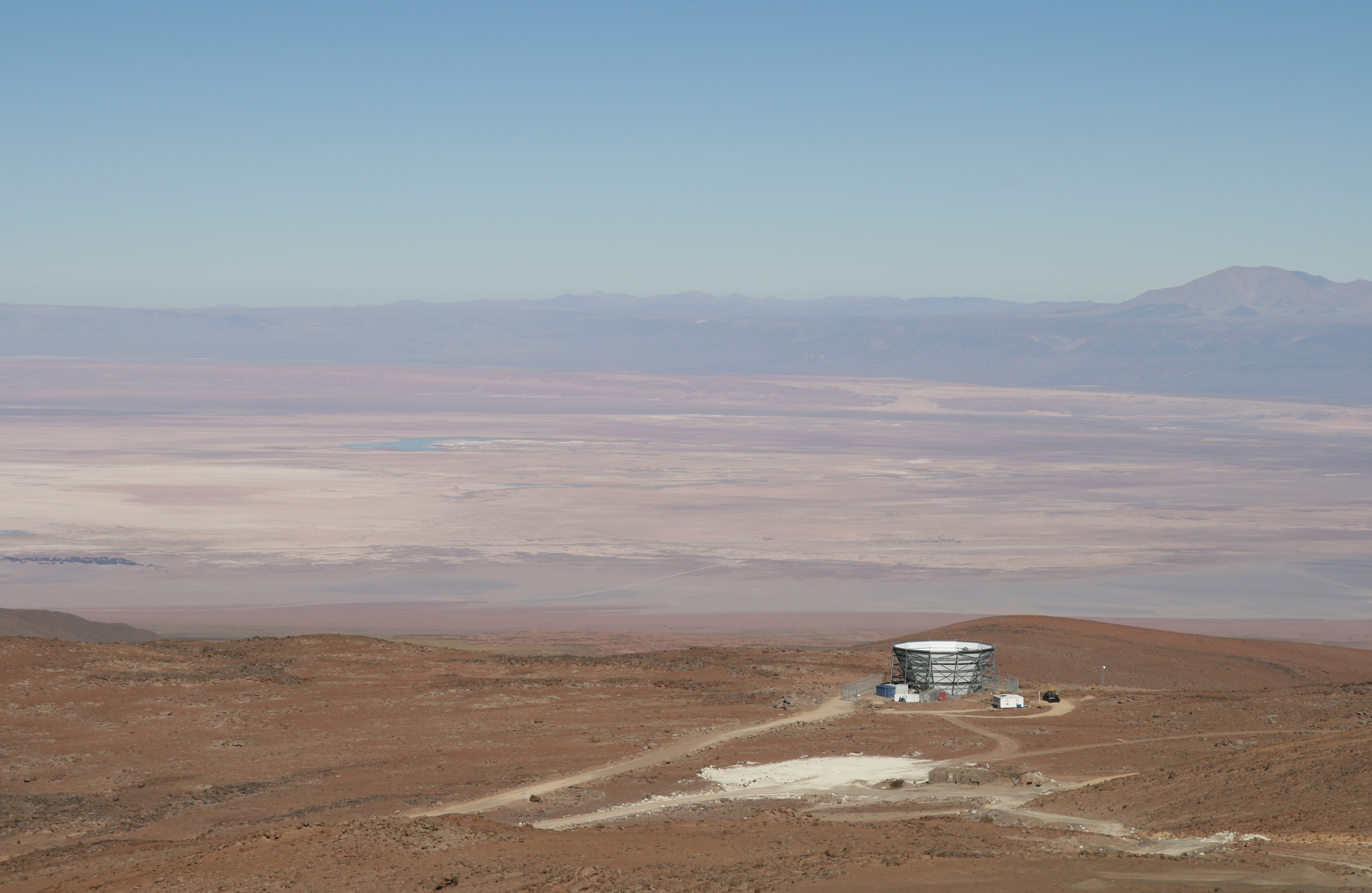
Atacama Cosmology Telescope from distance

Dunkley moved to Oxford in 2007 and was promoted to Professor of Astrophysics in 2014. Dunkley led analysis for the Atacama Cosmology Telescope in Chile, using gravitational lensing to identify dark matter. At Oxford her work included constraints on the number of possible neutrino species in the world. The images of the CMB, released in 2013, showed the universe at only 400,000 years old. Her research combines theoretical physics with statistical analysis and uses her models to understand the universe from cosmological observations. Alongside estimating how much the universe weighs, Dunkley can identify the proportions of dark energy and dark matter. She used gravitational lensing within the CMB as evidence for dark energy within the universe, selected by Physics Today as a highlight of 2011.

Dunkley rejoined Princeton in 2016. Her new research, using the Simons Observatory, looks for "new physics, complexities and extra particles that could have existed when the universe was very young,". In 2017, she was awarded the Breakthrough Prize for Physics with 22 members of the NASA WMAP Science Team.

=== Public engagement ===
Dunkley has given numerous public lectures and seminars. She has made appearances on BBC Stargazing Live and Dara Ó Briain's Science Club. She is mentioned in Pippa Goldschmidt's I Am Because You Are: An anthology of stories celebrating the centenary of the General Theory of Relativity. Her first book, Our Universe: An Astronomer's Guide was published in 2019. She will deliver a series of workshops and talks for students to raise awareness of women's contributions to astronomy as part of a book tour.

=== Awards and honours ===
Dunkley has won several awards and honours including:

- 2024 – Elected a Fellow of the Royal Society (FRS)
- 2020 – New Horizons in Physics Prize
- 2019 – Appointed Order of the British Empire (OBE) in the 2019 New Year Honours for services to Science
- 2017 – Breakthrough Prize in Fundamental Physics shared with 22 members of the NASA WMAP Science Team.
- 2016 – Rosalind Franklin Award and Lecture
- 2015 – Royal Society Wolfson Research Merit Award
- 2015 – Awarded Philip Leverhulme Prize by the Leverhulme Trust
- 2014 – Awarded the Fowler Prize by the Royal Astronomical Society (RAS)
- 2013 – Maxwell Medal and Prize
- 2012 – Gruber Prize in Cosmology, shared with the WMAP team
- 2010 – Starting grant from the European Research Council (ERC)
- 2007 – NASA Group Achievement Award, shared with the WMAP team

== Personal life ==
Dunkley has two children with her partner, the historian Faramerz Dabhoiwala.
