= Cranston (disambiguation) =

Cranston is a Scottish surname.

Cranston may also refer to:

== Place names ==
Scotland

- Cranston, Midlothian

Canada

- Cranston, Calgary, neighbourhood in Calgary, Alberta

United States

- Cranston, Iowa
- Cranston, Rhode Island
- Cranston Voting House No. 12 in Morehead, Kentucky
