= Gilles Fontaine =

Canadian astrophysicist (1948–2019)

- Born: 1948; Lévis, Quebec, Canada
- Died: November 1, 2019 (aged 71); Montreal, Quebec, Canada
- Known for: white dwarfs, sub-dwarf stars and astroseismology
- Awards: Steacie Prize, Fellow of the Royal Society of Canada
- Scientific career
- Institutions: University of Montreal
- Thesis: Outer layers of white dwarf stars (1974)
- Doctoral advisor: Hugh M. Van Horn

Gilles Fontaine (1948 – November 1, 2019) was a professor of astrophysics at the Université de Montréal in Quebec, Canada.

Fontaine's research interests included theoretical and observational studies of white dwarfs, sub-dwarf stars and astroseismology (the interpretation of variations in brightness of certain pulsating or vibrating stars to understand their interior structure). In particular, he found that white dwarfs can serve as test benches for the equation of state, the coefficient of transport, and the phase transition between solid and liquid states at very high densities.

== Early life and education ==
Gilles Fontaine was born in 1948 in Lévis, Quebec. He obtained a Bachelor of Science degree from Université Laval in 1969. He arrived at the University of Rochester in the fall of that year to begin his graduate work, initially hoping to study quantum optics. However, he ended up following his interest in astronomy to work with Hugh M. Van Horn on modeling convection in the surface layers of white dwarfs.

== Career ==
After receiving his PhD in 1974, he completed a postdoctoral fellowship at University of Western Ontario where he worked with John Landstreet, gaining experience with observational astronomy. In 1977 he became an assistant professor at the Université de Montréal. He was promoted to associate professor in 1980 and full professor 1986.

In 1981, expanding upon his PhD research in white dwarfs, Fontaine founded a research group specializing in white dwarf asteroseismology with his colleague François Wesemael. This research group received international acclaim for its wide-ranging contributions to our understanding of white dwarfs. Three of Fontaine's PhD students, would go on to win the Canadian Astronomical Society Plaskett medal, awarded for the most outstanding doctoral thesis in astronomy at a Canadian university.

In 1982, the group made headlines by predicting the existence of a new type of pulsating star, a DB white dwarf, which was later confirmed by telescope observations. This was the first time that the existence of a variable star was predicted by mathematical models first, rather than being discovered first through observations.

In 1987, Fontaine along with his collaborators, attempted to determine the age of the Universe using the amount of time it takes for white dwarfs to cool. Comparing observations to numerical simulations, the found that the Universe is between 10 billion and 300 million years old.

In 1990, his group published the first results from the Whole Earth Telescope, a network of telescopes around the world located at different longitudes that could collectively provide continuous observations of pulsating white dwarfs.

In 1996, the asteroseismology group at the Université de Montréal once again predicted a new type of variable star, a B-type white subdwarf, which was confirmed by observations by the South African Astronomical Observatory in 1997.

In 1992, he became a fellow of the Royal Society of Canada and in 2016 he was awarded the Canadian Association of Physicists Medal for Lifetime Achievement in Physics "for his pioneering, world-renowned work in theoretical and observational studies of white dwarf stars."

Over his career, he published more than 200 scientific articles. He was a member of the Institute for Research on Exoplanets (iRex) and the Centre de recherche en astrophysique du Québec (CRAQ).

Fontaine died November 2, 2019, in Montreal, Quebec.

== Awards ==
- 1986 - E.W.R. Steacie Memorial Research Fellowship
- 1987 - E.W.R. Steacie Prize
- 1989 - Urgel-Archambault award
- 1990 - Killam Fellowship
- 1992 - Fellow of the Royal Society of Canada
- 1999 - Prix Marie-Victorin
- 2000 - Carlyle S. Beals Prize
- 2001 - Tier 1 Canada Research Chair in Stellar Astrophysics
- 2012 - Top 10 Discoveries of the year 2012 by Québec Science
- 2016 - Canadian Association of Physicists (CAP) Medal for Lifetime Achievement in Physics
- 2019 - Asteroid 400811 Gillesfontaine was named in his honour.
