= Ingrid Stairs =

Canadian astronomer

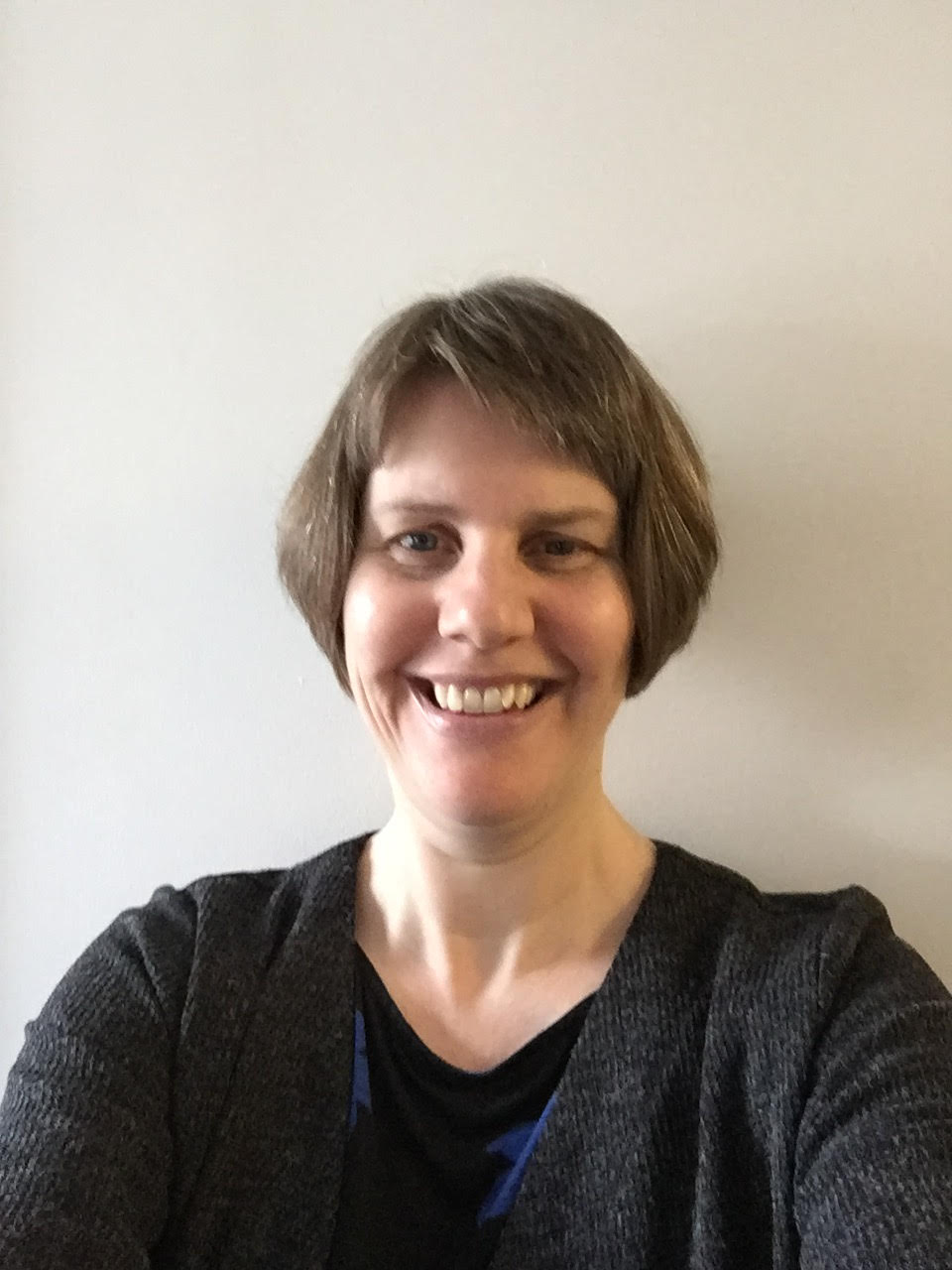
- Stairs in 2019
- Born: Canada
- Education: Princeton University (PhD); McGill University
- Scientific career
- Fields: Physics (astrophysics)
- Institutions: University of British Columbia
- Academic advisors: Joseph Taylor

Ingrid Stairs is a Canadian astronomer at the University of British Columbia. She studies pulsars and their companions as a way to study binary pulsar evolution, pulsar instrumentation and polarimetry, and Fast Radio Bursts (FRBs). She was awarded the 2017 Rutherford Memorial Medal for physics of the Royal Society of Canada, and was elected as a Fellow of the American Physical Society in 2018.

== Education ==
Stairs earned her undergraduate Honors degree from McGill University in 1993, and her Masters and PhD degrees from Princeton University in 1995 and 1998, respectively. For her PhD research, she worked with Professor Joe Taylor.

== Career ==
From 1998 to 2000, Stairs was a postdoctoral fellow at the Jodrell Bank Observatory in the United Kingdom. From 2000 to 2002, she was a research associate at NRAO in Green Bank, West Virginia. She became an assistant professor at the University of British Columbia in 2002, an associate professor in 2007, and a full professor in 2012.

== Research ==
Stairs investigates various topics related to the science of extreme gravitational objects. She uses large scale pulsar searches with both the Arecibo Telescope and Green Bank Telescope to study pulsar populations and their evolution and to find new millisecond pulsars and exotic binary systems. She has collaborated in the assembly of coherent dedispersion instruments for Arecibo and Green Bank. She times the bursts from millisecond pulsars as a member of the NANOGrav experiment.

In addition to finding pulsars, she uses long term pulsar timing to study the orbital dynamics of pulsar systems, such as and interaction between the two stars in the system. She has extensively studied relativistic binary systems like B1534+12, J1906+0746, and the double pulsar J0737-3039A/B. She also tracks some young pulsars, such as J1740-3502, which has a massive binary companion, and PSR 1828-11, which undergoes correlated timing and magnetospheric changes.

Stairs is part of the CHIME FRB and pulsar collaborations. CHIME is currently operational and has released many new FRB candidates, including new repeating FRB candidates. Stairs was responsible for managing the installation of the CHIME pulsar instrument.

== Honours and awards ==
- 2018 American Physical Society Fellow
- 2017 Royal Society of Canada Rutherford Memorial Medal in Physics
- 2017 Canadian Astronomical Society Peter G. Martin award for Mid-career Achievement
- 2014 Senior Fellow, CIFAR Cosmology & Gravity/Gravity & Extreme Universe programs
- 2010-2013 NSERC Discovery Accelerator Supplement
- 2002-2007 NSERC University Faculty Award
- 2000-2002 Jansky Research Associateship, NRAO
- 1998-2000 NSERC Postdoctoral Fellowship
- 1993-1997 NSERC 1967 Scholarship
- 1993 Joseph Henry Award, Princeton University
