= Gioiello (galaxy cluster) =

Galaxy cluster in the constellation Cetus

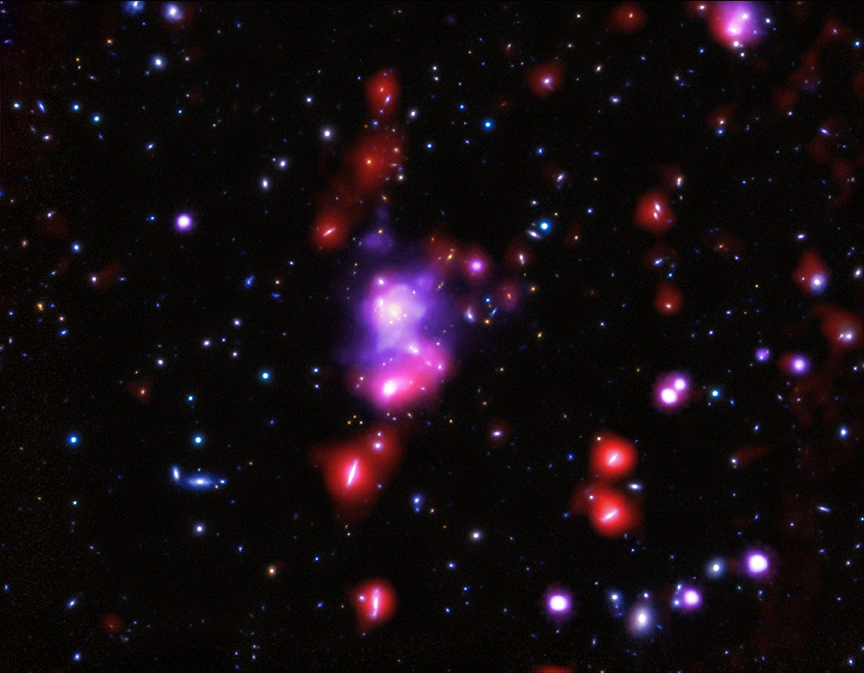
Composite capture of Gioiello

The XDCPJ0044.0-2033 (Gioello) galaxy cluster at redshift z=1.579 was discovered in the archive of the XMM-Newton mission, as part of the XMM-Newton Distant Cluster Project (XDCP) and first published by Santos et al. 2011. Gioiello is the most distant massive galaxy cluster that has been found and studied. This massive galaxy cluster contains 400 trillion times the mass of the Sun and is located 9.6 billion light years away from Earth. The name Gioiello, meaning "jewel" in Italian, was given to this massive galaxy cluster because an image of the cluster contains many beautiful pink, purple, and red sparkling colors from the hot X-ray–emitting gas and other star-forming galaxies within the cluster.

== History ==
Gioiello (lit. "Jewel" in Italian; officially XDCP J0044.0-2033) was first detected by astronomers in 2011 (Santos et al 2011). The follow-up research on this cluster using dedicated X-ray imaging from the Chandra observatory was discussed at the Italian village sharing its namesake, Villi il Gioiello. At this research meeting the unique properties of Gioiello were discussed at length. Some of these facts unique to Gioiello include that it emits purple light and is incredibly massive, containing 400 trillion times more mass than the Sun. Since the time of its discovery there has not been a wealth of new information released about Gioiello. The results of research surrounding Gioiello and other massive galaxy clusters were published in The Astrophysical Journal, with its main author being Paolo Tozzi of the National Institute for Astrophysics (INAF) in Florence, Italy. His co-author is Joana Santos, who is also from the National Institute for Astrophysics.

== Characteristics ==
Gioiello was spotted six times between 8 September and 24 November in 2013. The cluster image shown here is a composite of X-rays (purple); optical (red, green, blue); and far-infrared (red). This galaxy cluster is at the coordinates RA 00h 44m 05.20s | Dec −20° 33’ 59.70" which is located in the constellation Cetus. Gioiello is unique compared to other clusters in that it still has many stars forming within its galaxies. This gives astronomers a new perspective on the state of younger galaxy clusters and the way that they behave. Although several clusters have been confirmed at this size it is the only cluster with redshifts capable of diffusing X-ray emission which creates different limitations on the temperature and on the mass of the galaxy. Further research needs to be done to better understand these galaxies but as of now the outlook for further studies is low following the basis of currently planned missions.

== Surrounding galaxies ==
Galaxy clusters are the largest structures in the Universe held together by gravity. It is essential to observe these galaxy clusters with high redshift in order to understand how they have evolved over time. NASA observed this cluster over a period of four days. The time allotted to this study gave researchers the opportunity to identify the accurate mass of the cluster. These researchers determined that the Gioiello Cluster contains over 400 trillion times the mass of the Sun. Previous to the discovery of the Gioiello Cluster, researchers found another very large galaxy cluster named "El Gordo." This galaxy cluster was located 7 billion light years away, along with a few other distant clusters.

A distance estimate scale provided by NASA shows how difficult it is to find clusters as massive and as distant as Gioiello and El Gordo. This distance estimate scale shows the Solar System as being closest to the Sun, followed by the Milky Way, then nearby galaxies, distant galaxies, and finally the early universe. Looking at the scale, the location of the Gioiello Cluster with respect to the Sun stretches all the way to the early universe category. It is the most distant galaxy cluster that has been discovered thus far, although astronomers have discovered several smaller galaxy clusters that are quite close to the distance of Gioiello. These clusters have been identified as being more than 9.5 billion light-years away. However, some of these distant objects appeared to be proto-clusters, which are better defined as precursors to fully developed galaxy clusters.

These astronomers and researchers detected hints of uneven structure in the hot gas, which would appear as large clumps. These uneven structures could have been caused by collisions with smaller galaxy clusters, and provide clues to how the cluster became so massive very early on. These researchers expect that Gioiello is still young enough to be undergoing many interactions and changes in its composition.

== See also ==
- List of galaxies
- List of nearest galaxies
