= Diethard Böhme =

Canadian chemist

Diethard Kurt Böhme (born June 1941) is a Canadian chemist, currently a Distinguished Research Professor Emeritus and formerly a Canada Research Chair (2000-2013) at York University.

He was born during World War II to the son of a member of the German consular staff in Boston, Massachusetts. After the war he studied at McGill University in Montreal, Canada, gaining a B.Sc. in 1962 and a Ph.D. in 1965.

During his Ph.D. work he was responsible for the construction of the first quadrupole mass spectrometer in Canada as part of his studies on gas phase ion chemistry. He pursued his interest in the subject as a post-doctoral Research Associate at the University of London and at the Aeronomy Laboratory of the Environmental Sciences Service Administration in Boulder, Colorado. During this period he did pioneering work on the measurement of accurate gas phase acidities of organic molecules using the newly developed flowing afterglow technique.

In 1970 he moved to the new York University in north Toronto to join the Chemistry Department, where he spent the next 35+ years working in a number of areas of chemistry as well as contributing to significant instrumental developments associated with the flowing afterglow technique.

From 2000 to 2013 he was Canada Research Chair in Physical Chemistry (Chemical Mass Spectrometry).

== Honours and awards ==
- 1981 Rutherford Memorial Medal for Chemistry by the Royal Society of Canada.
- 1998 J.C. Polanyi Award of the Canadian Society for Chemistry
- 2002 F.P. Lossing Award in Mass Spectrometry from the Canadian Society for Mass Spectrometry
- 2006 G. Herzberg Award of the Canadian Society for Analytical Sciences and Spectroscopy
- 2007 Chemical Institute of Canada Medal
- Fellow of the Royal Society of Canada
