= Michael L. W. Thewalt =

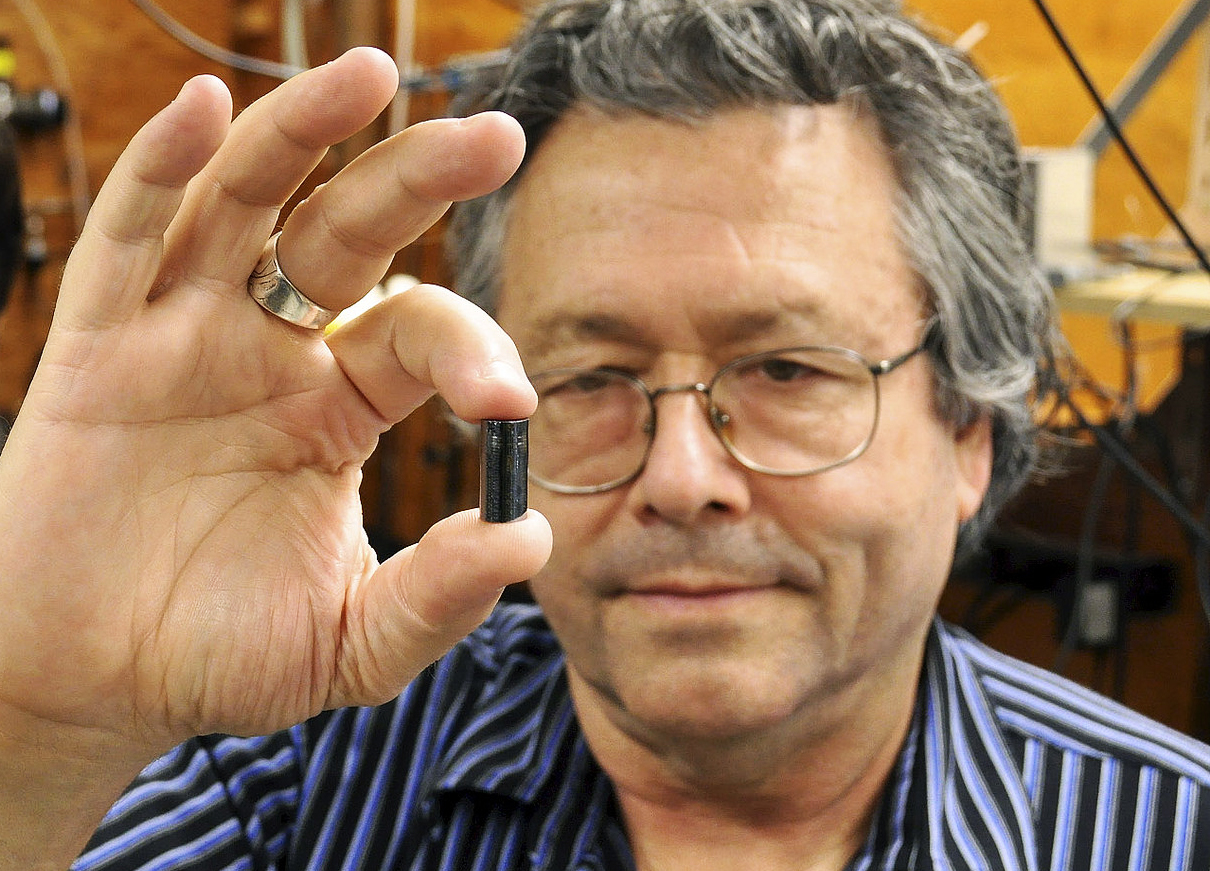
Mike Thewalt in 2017

Michael L. W. Thewalt (born 5 December 1949 in Karlsruhe, Germany) is a Canadian physicist. He received his BSc from McMaster University in 1972. His MSc and PhD were from the University of British Columbia in the mid-1970s. He teaches at Simon Fraser University and is known for researching semiconductors, especially isotopically enriched silicon.

== Awards ==
- 1994 Rutherford Memorial Medal
- 2004 Brockhouse Medal
- 2013 SFU Dean's Award for Excellence in Graduate Supervision
