= François Wesemael =

Canadian astrophysicist

- Born: 1954
- Died: 2011
- Known for: Stellar atmospheres
- Awards: Rutherford Memorial Medal, Canadian Association of Physicists Herzberg Medal
- Scientific career
- Institutions: University of Montreal
- Thesis: Atmospheres for Hot, High-Gravity Pure Helium Stars (1979)
- Doctoral advisor: Hugh M. Van Horn and Malcolm P. Savedoff

François Wesemael (20 January 1954 in Vietnam – 28 September 2011 in Montreal, Quebec) was a Canadian astrophysicist who specialised in modeling stellar atmospheres.

He was widely recognized for his talents in communication and outreach, and a supervisor of student projects.

== Early life and education ==
François Wesemael was born in Vietnam, moving with his family to France, Luxemburg and then Canada during his childhood. He received a bachelor's degree from the Université de Montréal in 1974.

Wesemael completed a PhD under the supervision of Hugh M. Van Horn and Malcolm P. Savedoff at the University of Rochester. During this time, he constructed models for white dwarfs with both hydrogen and helium atmospheres.

== Career ==
After receiving his PhD in 1979, he became a professor at the Department of Physics at the Université de Montréal. He remained there for the rest of his career.

Specializing in the modeling of stellar atmospheres, his principal contributions focused on the photospheres of subdwarf and white dwarf stars, the spectral evolution of white dwarfs and the astroseismology of stellar remnants. He was a member of the white dwarf asteroseismology group at Université de Montréal, along with his colleague Gilles Fontaine. This research group received international acclaim for its wide ranging contributions to our understanding of white dwarfs.

From the mid-2000s, Wesemael began to increasingly focus his work on the history of science, including the development of astronomy and astrophysics in the nineteenth and twentieth centuries, and the development and sharing of knowledge in the seventeenth century.

== Awards ==
- 1992 - Rutherford Memorial Medal of the Royal Society of Canada.
- 1988 - Herzberg Medal from the Canadian Association of Physicists.

== Popular works ==
- 2006 - Profession astronome, Les presses de l'Université de Montréal
