= Jillian Buriak =

Canadian nanotechnologist

- Occupation: Professor
- Title: Canada Research Chair

Academic background
- Education: Harvard University
- Alma mater: Université Louis Pasteur

Academic work
- Discipline: Chemistry
- Sub-discipline: Nanotechnology
- Institutions: University of Alberta, Purdue University

Jillian M. Buriak FRSC is a Canadian chemist, formerly a Canada Research Chair in nanomaterials at University of Alberta. She is known for her work developing flexible, lightweight solar cells made from nanoparticles.

== Education and career ==
Buriak completed an A.B. degree at Harvard University (1990) and a Ph.D. at Université Louis Pasteur (1995), Strasbourg, working on organometallic chemistry and catalysis. She held a postdoctoral appointment at the Scripps Research Institute at La Jolla, California, working on self-assembly of nanostructures on surfaces. Buriak started her independent faculty career at Purdue University in 1997, was promoted to associate professor, with tenure, in 2001. In 2003, she joined the University of Alberta as a full professor.

From 2003 to 2008, Buriak was on the Board of Reviewing Editors (BoRE) at Science (handling 7-10 papers per week). She was an associate editor at ACS Nano from 2009 to 2013 (handling >500 papers per year). In 2014, she was appointed as the editor-in-chief of Chemistry of Materials, handling ~5000 papers per year.

== Research interests ==
Buriak is interested in materials for energy, nanomaterials synthesis, silicon surface chemistry, and block copolymer self assembly.

By spraying a plastic surface with nanomaterials, her work showed the ability to fabricate a transparent layer of electrode that acts as solar cells. Due to their flexibility, they could be incorporated onto different surfaces.

== Selected honors ==
- 2009: Fellow of the Royal Society of Canada
- 2009: Fellow of the American Association for the Advancement of Science
- 2005: Rutherford Memorial Medal (Chemistry) of the Royal Society of Canada
- 2002-2004: Canada Research Chair of Nanomaterials
- 2004: Canada's Top 40 Under 40
- 2003: ACS Pure Chemistry Award
- 2002: Camille Dreyfus Teacher-Scholar Award
- 2001: Fresenius Award
- 2000-2002: Cottrell Teacher-Scholar
