= Cranston =

Cranston, Cranstoun or Cranstone is a Scottish surname originating in a clan that lived around Roxburgh in the Scottish Borders. It is a minor clan but has its own tartan and clan brooch. Notable people with the surname include:

== Real people ==
- Alan Cranston (1914–2000), American politician from California
- Andrew Cranston (born 1969), Scottish painter
- Alistair Cranston Former Scottish rugby union player
- Bryan Cranston (born 1956), American actor
- Catherine Cranston (1849–1934), also known as Kate Cranston or Miss Cranston, tea room proprietor
- Earl Cranston (1840–1932), bishop of the Methodist Episcopal Church
- Edwin Cranston, professor of Japanese at Harvard University
- Emily Cranston, Canadian chemist
- John Cranston, colonial governor of Rhode Island
- Ken Cranston (1917–2007), former English cricketer
- Kyle Cranston (born 1992), Australian Decathlete, 2017 World University Games Decathlon Champion
- Lefevre James Cranstone (1822–1893), English artist
- Mary Cranston Mason (1846–1932), social reformer and temperance leader
- Mary Rankin Cranston (died 1931), American librarian, non-fiction writer, sociological engineer
- Maurice Cranston (1920–1993), British philosopher and political scientist
- Ross Cranston (born 1948), British lawyer and politician, member of Parliament for Dudley
- Samuel Cranston, colonial governor of Rhode Island
- Tim Cranston (born 1962), Canadian ice hockey player
- Tom Cranston (footballer) (1891–1916), Scottish footballer
- Thomas George Cranston (1877–1954), Irish chess player
- Toller Cranston (1949–2015), Canadian figure skater and artist

== Fictional characters ==
- Billy Cranston, a character from the Power Rangers universe
- Lamont Cranston, a crime-fighting vigilante from the 1930s series The Shadow
- Kirk Cranston, a fictional character on the NBC daytime soap opera Santa Barbara
- Rachel Cranston, a female character on the television series NCIS
- Chuck Cranston, the lowlife boyfriend of Ariel Moore in the movie Footloose
