= Keith Fagnou =

Canadian organic chemist (1971–2009)

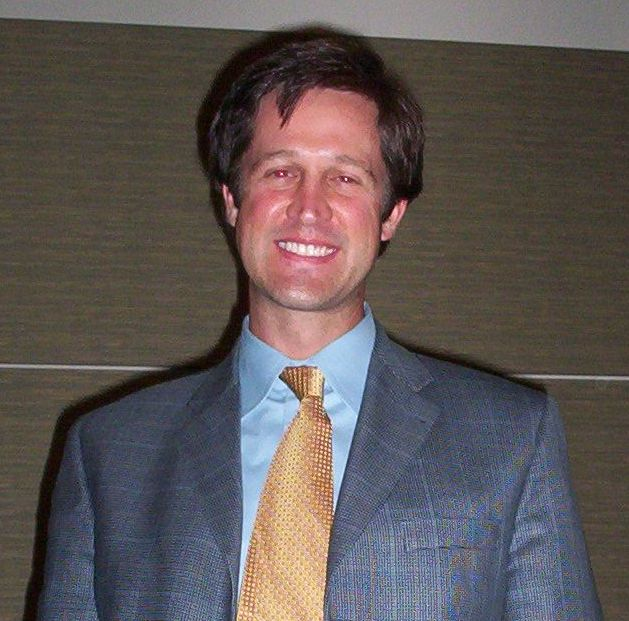
- Keith Fagnou at the ACS meeting, Aug 2007
- Born: 27 June 1971; Saskatoon, Saskatchewan, Canada
- Died: 11 November 2009 (aged 38)
- Scientific career
- Workplaces: University of Ottawa

Keith Fagnou (June 27, 1971 – November 11, 2009) was a Canadian organic chemist and studied education and was a professor of chemistry at University of Saskatchewan and associate professor of organic chemistry at the University of Ottawa. His research focused on developing new reactions that avoid unnecessary activation of substrates and that can instead directly functionalize C–H bonds of simple molecules and introduce C–C bonds.

== Biography ==
Dr. Keith Fagnou was born on June 27, 1971, in Saskatoon, Saskatchewan. Fagnou, a former naval reserve officer, pursued studies at the University of Saskatchewan and received a Bachelor of Education (B.Ed.) in 1995. After teaching at the high school level for a short period, he continued his studies in chemistry at the University of Toronto in 1998 under the supervision of Mark Lautens. In 2000 he received his M.Sc. degree, and in 2002 his Ph.D. Professor Lautens said that Keith "was exceptionally bright and exceptionally down-to-earth and was the most productive person, in the history of his research group." After his PhD, he joined the faculty at the University of Ottawa as an assistant professor and in 2007 was promoted to associate professor with tenure and awarded a University of Ottawa Research Chair in the Development of Novel Catalytic Transformations.

While at the University of Ottawa, he established a research program primarily devoted to the development of novel "direct arylation" reactions which allow for the rapid synthesis of important building blocks in medicinal chemistry. Of note, the development of direct arylation of benzene and pyridine N-oxide. Members of his research group are sometimes referred to as "The Fagnou Factory". His contributions in the field were rewarded with numerous awards and have been included in reviews published on the subject.

Dr. Keith Fagnou died of complications resulting from a H1N1 influenza infection on November 11, 2009, at the age of 38.

The University of Ottawa established the "Keith Fagnou Scholarship in Science" in his memory. The members of his research group also organized a symposium (KFOS) in his honour which was held May 5–7, 2010. The Pacifichem chemistry conference also held a memorial symposium titled "C-H Functionalization, Memorial Symposium for Professor Keith Fagnou". In 2011, Keith was recognized as the #77 chemist in the world over the period 2000-2010 on the basis of citations per paper, according to Thomson-Reuters' Sciencewatch.com.

== Awards ==
- Rutherford Memorial Medal (2009)
- OMCOS Award (2009)
- Sloan Research Fellowship (2008)
- Merck Process Award (2008)
- Eli Lilly Grantee (2007–2009)
- NSERC Discovery Accelerator Supplement Award (2007–2009)
- Amgen Young Investigator's Award (2007)
- Astra Zeneca Award for Chemistry (2007)
- University of Ottawa Research Chair in Novel Catalytic Transformations (2007–2012)
- Merck Process Research Award (2007)
- University of Ottawa Young Researcher of the Year (2006)
- Ichikizaki Travel Grant Award (2006)
- Boehringer Ingelheim Young Investigator Award in Organic Chemistry (2005)
- Cottrell Scholar Award (2005)
- Ichikizaki Travel Grant Award (2005)
- Premier's Research Excellence Award (2003)
- John C. Polanyi Award in Chemistry (2003)
