= Pedro G. Ferreira =

Portuguese astrophysicist and author

Pedro Gil Ferreira
- Born: 18 March 1968 (age 58); Lisbon, Portugal
- Citizenship: British/Portuguese
- Education: Technical University of Lisbon; Imperial College London
- Known for: Quintessence; Modified gravity
- Scientific career
- Fields: Cosmology
- Workplaces: University of Oxford; CERN; University of California Berkeley
- Doctoral advisor: Andreas Albrecht
- Notable students: Jo Dunkley

Pedro Gil Ferreira (born 18 March 1968) is a Portuguese astrophysicist and author. As of 2016 he is Professor of Astrophysics at the University of Oxford, and a fellow of Wolfson College.

== Education and early life ==
Ferreira was born in Lisbon, Portugal, and attended the Technical University of Lisbon, where he studied engineering from 1986 to 1991. While there, he taught himself general relativity. He studied for a PhD in theoretical physics at Imperial College London, supervised by Andy Albrecht.

== Research and career ==
He occupied postdoctoral positions at Berkeley and CERN, before returning to the UK to join the faculty in the astrophysics department at the University of Oxford as a research fellow and lecturer. He became Professor of Astrophysics there in 2008. He has been director of the Programme on Computational Cosmology at the Oxford Martin School since 2010, and also runs an astrophysics 'artist in residency' programme. Ferreira regularly lectures at the African Institute for Mathematical Sciences, and has frequently appeared on TV and radio as a science commentator.

Ferreira's main interests are in general relativity and theoretical cosmology. He has authored more than 100 publications in peer-reviewed scientific journals. With Michael Joyce, in 1997, he was one of the first to propose quintessence scalar field models as a possible explanation of dark energy. Ferreira was also a member of the MAXIMA and BOOMERanG balloon-borne CMB experiments, which measured the acoustic peaks of the CMB. He is currently involved in several proposals to test general relativity using the Euclid spacecraft and Square Kilometre Array radio telescope.

=== Media ===
Ferreira is a regular contributor to the scientific press, including Nature, Science, and New Scientist, and has authored two popular science books on cosmology and the history of general relativity. One of them, The Perfect Theory, was shortlisted for the 2014 Royal Society Winton Prize for Science Books. He regularly appears on TV and radio to discuss astrophysics and cosmology news stories, and has contributed to several science and mathematics documentaries for the BBC, Discovery Channel, and others. In 2016, he served on the editorial board of the Open Journal of Astrophysics.

=== Books ===
- Ferreira, Pedro G. (2006). The State of the Universe - A Primer in Modern Cosmology. Weidenfeld & Nicolson. ISBN 978-0297847403.
- Ferreira, Pedro G. (2014). The Perfect Theory: A Century of Geniuses and the Battle over General Relativity. Little, Brown. ISBN 978-1408703106.

=== TV and video ===
- Stephen Hawking: Master of the Universe (Channel 4) 2008
- The One Show (BBC) 2009
- Naked Science: Hawking's Universe (National Geographic) 2009
- Horizon: Is Everything We Know About the Universe Wrong? (BBC) 2010
- Beautiful Equations (BBC) 2010
- The Beauty of Diagrams (BBC) 2010
