= Aashish Clerk =

Canadian condensed matter physicist

- Awards: Rutherford Memorial Medal; Simons Investigator in Physics; Sloan Research Fellowship; E.W.R. Steacie Memorial Fellowship

Academic background
- Education: BSc, 1996, University of Toronto; PhD, physics, 2001, Cornell University
- Thesis: Aspects of Andreev scattering and Kondo physics in mesoscopic systems (2001)

Academic work
- Institutions: Pritzker School of Molecular Engineering; McGill University
- Main interests: Quantum engineering
- Website: clerkgroup.uchicago.edu

Aashish A. Clerk is a Canadian theoretical physicist working in the fields of condensed matter, quantum optics and quantum information. He is a Professor of Molecular Engineering in the University of Chicago Pritzker School of Molecular Engineering. Prior to joining UChicago, Clerk was a Tier 1 Canada Research Chair in Theory of Engineered Quantum Systems at McGill University. In 2021, Clerk was elected a Fellow of the American Physical Society for distinguished contributions to theoretical quantum science (namely contributions to the theory of quantum optomechanical systems, quantum dissipation engineering, and other areas of quantum optics).

== Early life and education ==
Clerk earned his Bachelor of Science in 1996 from the University of Toronto and his PhD in physics from Cornell University in 2001. He then worked as a postdoctoral fellow at Yale University from 2001 to 2004.

== Career ==
=== McGill University ===
In 2004, Clerk became an assistant professor and Tier 2 Canada Research Chair (CRC) in Theoretical Mesoscopic Physics at McGill University. As an assistant professor and CRC, Clerk studied quantum mechanical effects on a larger scale and how quantum noise can be understood and utilized. He received a 2007 Sloan Research Fellowship to help advance his research into complex quantum-mechanical behaviours. His CRC was renewed in 2009 and he was also awarded tenure.

Clerk's mid-career research focused on controlling quantum interactions between light and matter to develop advanced quantum technologies. He helped establish the foundations of basic theoretical language used to describe measurement, control and dissipation in quantum optomechanical systems. Clerk's efforts were recognized in 2014 with the Natural Sciences and Engineering Research Council E.W.R. Steacie Memorial Fellowship and an election to the Royal Society of Canada's College of New Scholars. The following year, he received the Royal Society of Canada's Rutherford Memorial Medal for research excellence in physics. In 2016, Clerk was named a Tier 1 Canada Research Chair in Theory of Engineered Quantum Systems.

=== Pritzker School of Molecular Engineering ===
Clerk left McGill in 2017 to join the faculty at the University of Chicago's Pritzker School of Molecular Engineering. In 2019, Clerk and colleagues at Yale University discovered a new method for achieving nonreciprocal phonon transport between mechanical resonators. Their new approach allows continuous, tunable, and directional energy transfer, along with a novel form of cooling based on nonreciprocal dynamics. The following year, Clerk was named a Simons Investigator in Physics. In 2021, he was elected a Fellow of the American Physical Society for distinguished contributions to the theory of quantum optomechanical systems, quantum dissipation engineering, and other areas of quantum optics.

== See also ==
- List of fellows of the American Physical Society (2011–present)
