= El Gordo (galaxy cluster) =

Largest distant galaxy cluster observed

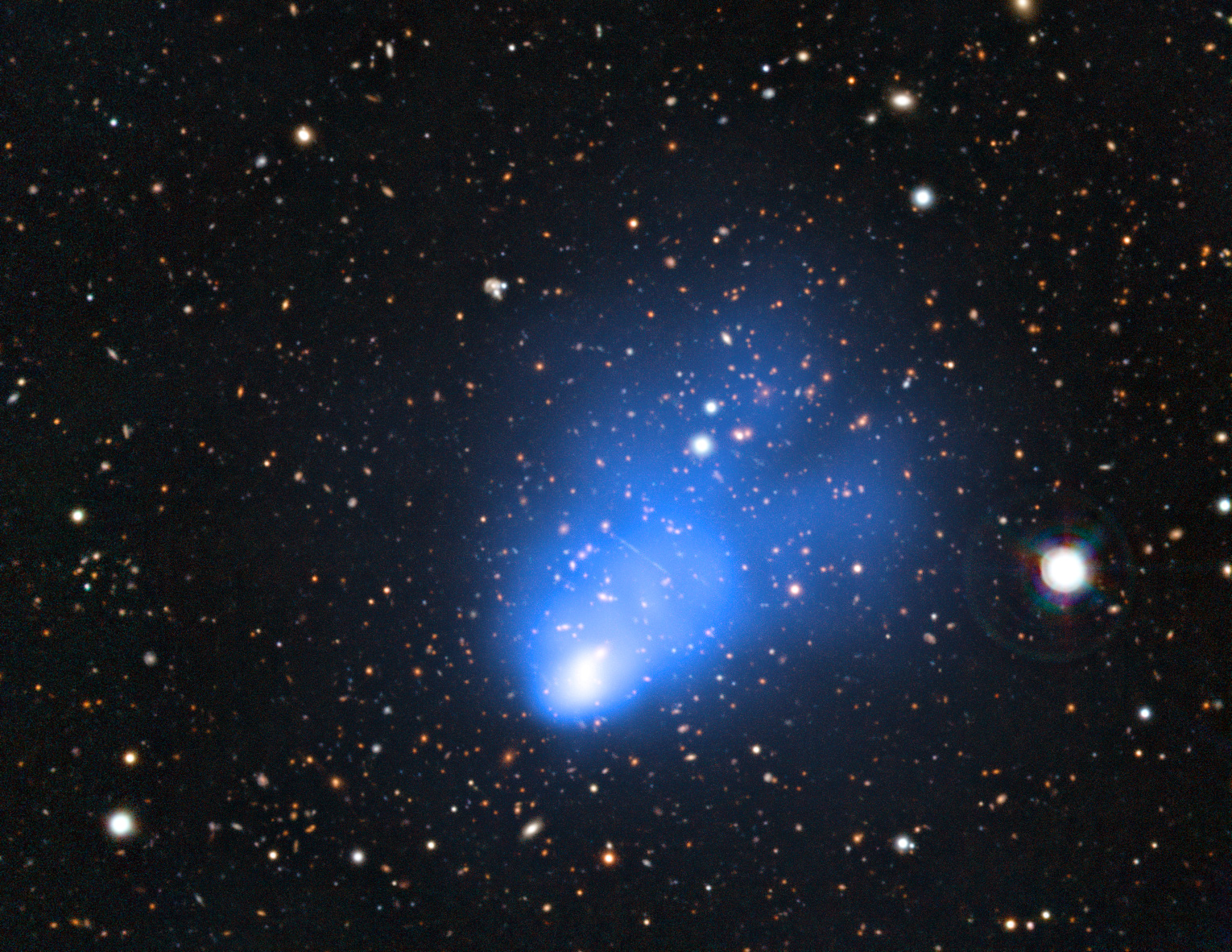
- El Gordo consists of two separate galaxy sub-clusters colliding at several million kilometres per hour.

Observation data (Epoch J2000.0)
- Constellation: Phoenix
- Right ascension: 01^{h} 02^{m} 52.50^{s}
- Declination: −49° 14′ 58.0″
- Redshift: 0.87

Other designations
- El Gordo, ACT-CL J0102-4915, SPT-CL J0102-4915

This video shows the distant merging galaxy cluster ACT-CL J0102−4915.

El Gordo (lit. The Fat One) (ACT-CL J0102-4915 or SPT-CL J0102-4915) is the largest distant galaxy cluster observed at its distance or beyond, as of 2011. As of 2014, it held the record for being the largest distant galaxy cluster to have been discovered with a mass of slightly less than three quadrillion solar masses although later its mass was reduced to about 2.1×10^{15} (2.1 quadrillion) solar masses with a 10% uncertainty. It was found by NASA's Chandra X-ray Observatory, the Atacama Cosmology Telescope (funded by the National Science Foundation) and the European Southern Observatory's Very Large Telescope.

This galaxy cluster, officially named, 'ACT-CL J0102-4915', has been given the nickname 'El Gordo' (Spanish for "the Fat One") by researchers as an homage to the telescopes used for its discovery in the Atacama Desert in Northern Chile (ACT, VLT and SOAR). It is located more than 7 billion light-years from Earth.

Findings and results on 'El Gordo' were announced at the 219th meeting of American Astronomical Society in Austin, Texas.

== Observations ==
Findings from the European Southern Observatory's Very Large Telescope and the Chandra X-ray Observatory show that El Gordo is composed of two separate galaxy subclusters, colliding at several million kilometers per hour. These observations (using X-ray data and other characteristics) suggest that El Gordo most probably formed in the same manner as the Bullet Cluster (which is located 4 billion light-years from Earth).

== El Gordo and ΛCDM ==
It was claimed that this interacting cluster presents problems for the conventional Lambda-CDM model of cosmology because it is hard to reconcile ΛCDM's model of galaxy formation with the combination of how early El Gordo is observed in cosmic history, its large mass, and its high collision velocity. It was argued that later more accurate measurements have rejected this claim and led to a smaller mass estimate fully consistent with the ΛCDM cosmology. However, the claims of consistency with ΛCDM were shown to be due to the assumption of a very low collision velocity that is not supported by any hydrodynamical simulations, not because of the slightly reduced mass estimate, which by itself does not solve the problem. According to Cristóbal Sifón from Pontifical Catholic University of Chile "this is the first time we've found a system like the Bullet Cluster at such a large distance."

== Gallery ==
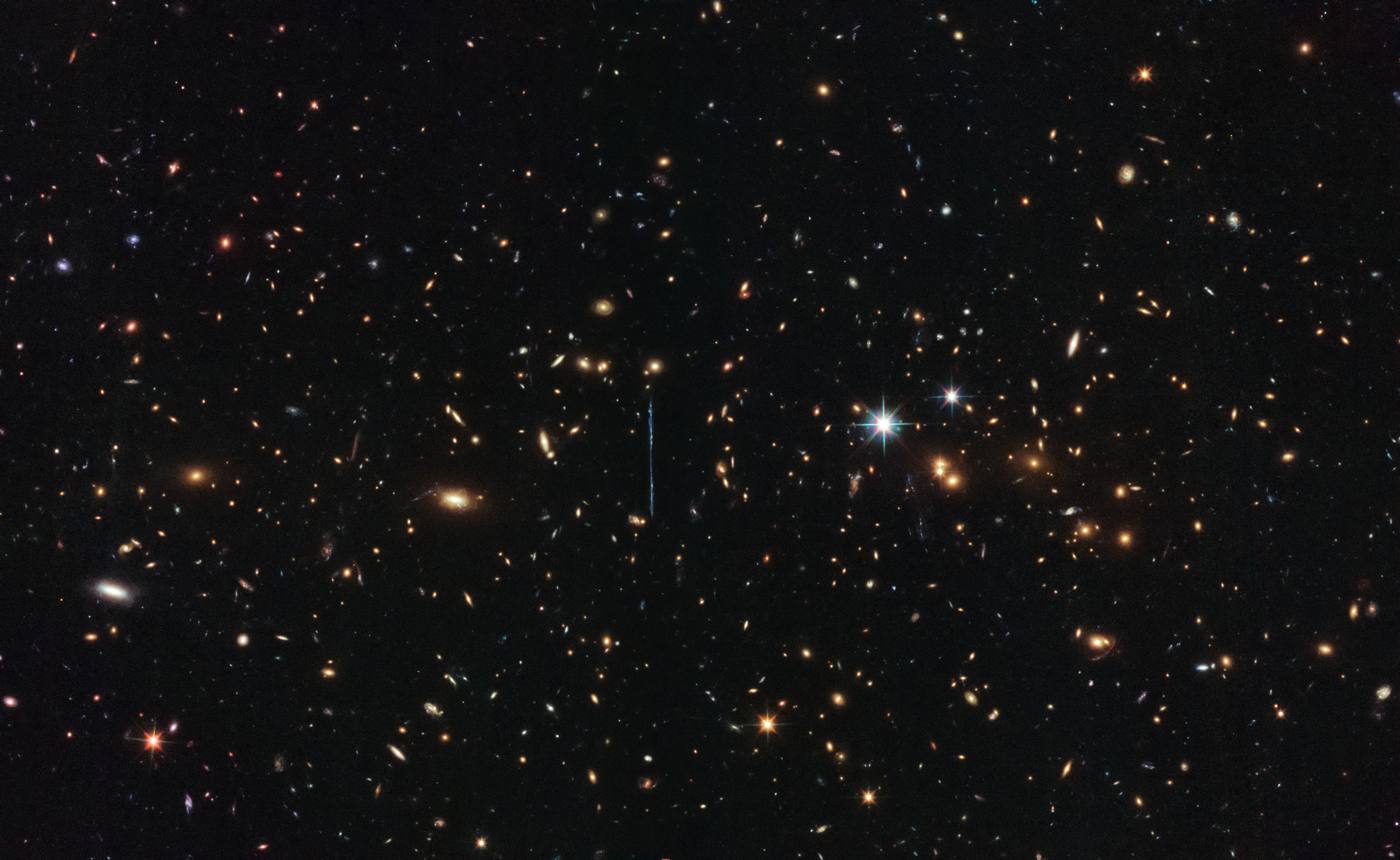
Galaxy cluster ACT-CL J0102-4915 contains the mass of about two million billion suns.

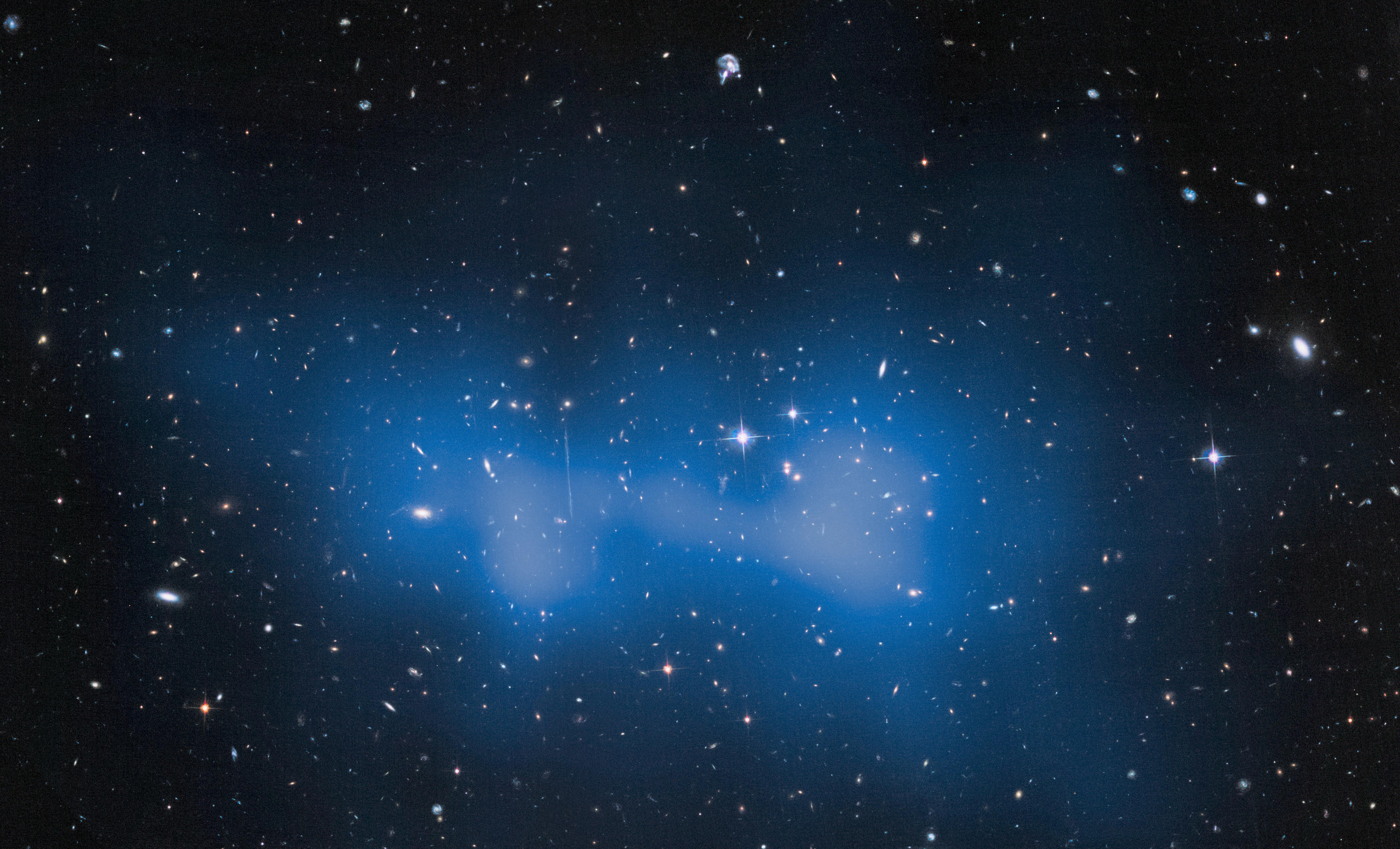
Hubble image of ACT-CL J0102-4915

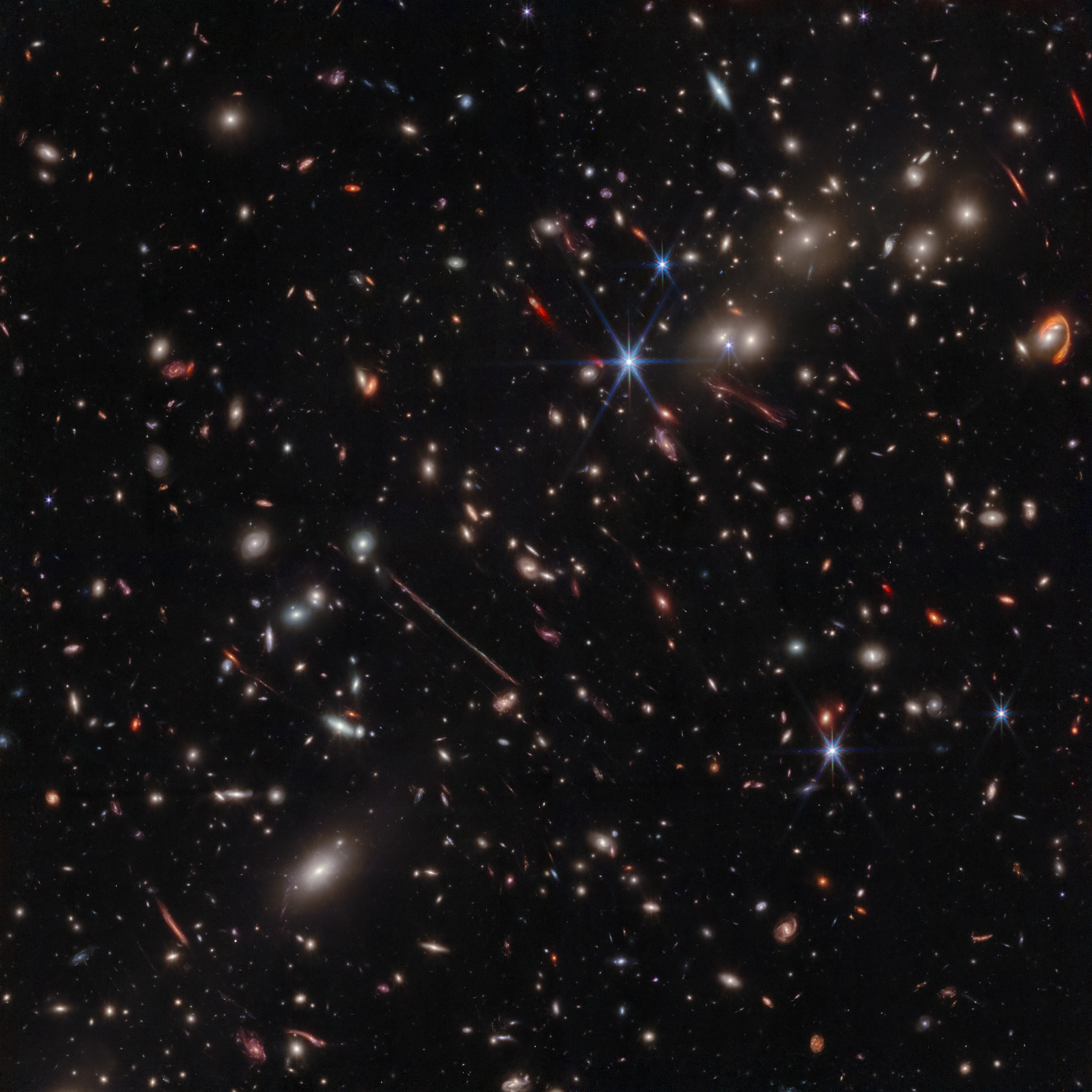
JWST image of ACT-CL J0102-4915

== See also ==
- List of galaxy groups and clusters
- RCS2 J2327, another galaxy cluster being the second-most-massive galaxy cluster at a record of two quadrillion, or two million billion, suns.
