= C/1961 O1 (Wilson–Hubbard) =

Non-periodic comet

C/1961 O1 (Wilson-Hubbard)
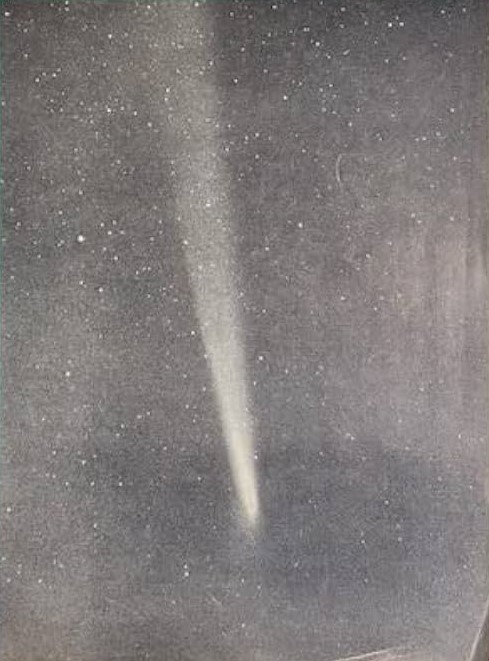
- The comet on 25 July 1961

Discovery
- Discovered by: A. Steward Wilson; W. B. Hubbard
- Discovery date: 23 July 1961

Designations
- Alternative designations: 1961d, 1961 V

Orbital characteristics
- Epoch: 23 September 1961 (JD 2437565.5)
- Observation arc: 36 days
- Number of observations: 8
- Aphelion: ~1000 AU
- Perihelion: 0.040 AU
- Semi-major axis: ~500 AU
- Eccentricity: 0.9999
- Orbital period: ~11,000 years
- Inclination: 24.21°
- Longitude of ascending node: 298.94°
- Argument of periapsis: 270.70°
- Last perihelion: 17 July 1961
- T_{Jupiter}: 0.237
- Earth MOID: 0.367 AU
- Jupiter MOID: 2.09 AU

Physical characteristics
- Comet total magnitude (M1): 8.6
- Apparent magnitude: 3 (1961 apparition)

C/1961 O1 (Wilson–Hubbard) is a non-periodic comet discovered on 23 July 1961. The comet passed perihelion on 17 July, became visible in twilight on 23 July, having a long tail, and faded rapidly, becoming no longer visible with the naked eye after the first days of August.

== Observational history ==
The comet was spotted on 23 July 1961 by air navigator A. Steward Wilson on board a Boeing 707 flying from Honolulu to Portland, Oregon. The aircraft was at an altitude of 8,800 meters when Wilson noted a light source that looked like a searchlight next to theta Aurigae. He examined it with binoculars as it rose above the horizon and found its nucleus next to tau Geminorum, identifying the source of light as a comet. He estimated its magnitude to be 3.5. The comet was at a solar elongation of 17°. W. B. Hubbard saw the comet on 24 July from the McDonald Observatory while observing the Echo satellite and estimated its magnitude to be 3.

Subsequently, more independent discoveries were reported. Flight attendant A. Ras spotted the tail of the comet, measuring 15° long, at sunrise while flying over Libya. P. W. Bailey saw the tail of the comet on 24 July from near Seville, Spain, and using binoculars estimated the tail rose 35 degrees above the horizon. The comet was also spotted from other persons on board flying aircraft on 24 July. The presence of the comet was also confirmed by professional astronomers on 24 July, who estimated its magnitude to be between 3 and 3.4.

On 25 July, Alan McClure photographed the comet and noted it had a tail 21 degrees long and an antitail about 3.3° long, while visually the tail extended for 23 degrees and the anti-tail for 1.5 degrees. He estimated the brightness of the comet with the naked eye to be 3.2. A. A. Nikitin reported that the tail of the comet on 25 July was 30 degrees long when observed with binoculars. On 29 July the magnitude of the comet was estimated to be 4 and its tail to be 3–4 degrees long.

The comet faded rapidly and on 6 August its magnitude was estimated to be 6–7 photographically. On 10 August its magnitude was estimated with the naked eye to be 6.8 while the tail was 4 degrees long. The closest approach to Earth was on August 14, at a distance of 0.79 AU. On August 16 it was reported that the comet had a long tail with a faint central concentration with little to no coma. The comet was last detected on 9 November, when it had a photographic magnitude of 19.

== Scientific results ==
The spectrum of the comet was obtained on 26 July, when it was 0.425 AU from the Sun. The spectrum revealed a very strong sodium D-line, NH2 emission, diatomic carbon lines and weak cyanide bands, while lines associated with CH and triatomic carbon were not detected.
