= Emily Cranston =

Canadian chemist and academic

Emily D. Cranston
- Education: McGill University
- Scientific career
- Workplaces: KTH Royal Institute of Technology; University of British Columbia
- Thesis: Polyelectrolyte multilayer films containing nanocrystalline cellulose. (2011)
- Website: Sustainable Nano Biocomposites Lab

Emily D. Cranston is a Canadian chemist who is a professor at the University of British Columbia and President’s Excellence Chair in Forest Bioproducts. She investigates nanocellulose and hybrid bio-based materials. Cranston is an NSERC E.W.R. Steacie fellow and was awarded the Kavli Emerging Leader in Chemistry lectureship in 2018 and the Tappi NanoDivision Technical Award in 2021.

== Early life and education ==
Cranston was born in Halifax, Nova Scotia. After completing high school, she moved to Quebec. She was an undergraduate student at McGill University, where she studied chemistry and worked on multi-media tools for teaching chemistry and studied biodegradable polymers. She earned her doctorate under the supervision of Derek Gray. Her doctoral research developed multi-layer polyelectrolyte films that contained nano crystalline cellulose. She then moved to the KTH Royal Institute of Technology, where she worked as a postdoctoral scholar investigating the properties of cellulose.

== Research and career ==
Cranston returned to Canada in 2011, and joined the faculty at McMaster University. Her research considers the colloid and surface chemistry of biopolymers. She has particularly focused on the development of nanocellulose microstructures that can be used in a broad range of applications, including packaging, electrical components and cosmetics. Nanocellulose is produced from wood pulp, and possesses an exceptionally high mechanical strength. In particular, Cranston looks to improve compatibility between the components in composites, to understand their potential toxicity and standardised metrological measurements.

== Awards and honours ==
- 2016 KINGFA Young Investigator’s Award
- 2018 Kavli Foundation Emerging Leader in Chemistry Lecturer
- 2021 E.W.R. Steacie Memorial Fellowship
- 2021 Tappi NanoDivision Technical Award

== Selected publications ==
- Kevin J. De France; Todd Hoare; Emily D. Cranston (26 April 2017). "Review of Hydrogels and Aerogels Containing Nanocellulose". Chemistry of Materials. 29 (11): 4609–4631. doi:10.1021/acs.chemmater.7b00531. ISSN 0897-4756. Wikidata Q57358032.
- E Johan Foster; Robert J Moon; Umesh P Agarwal; et al. (16 April 2018). "Current characterization methods for cellulose nanomaterials". Chemical Society Reviews. 47 (8): 2609–2679. doi:10.1039/c6cs00895j. ISSN 0306-0012. PMID 29658545. Wikidata Q52586756.
- Emily D Cranston; Derek G Gray (1 September 2006). "Morphological and optical characterization of polyelectrolyte multilayers incorporating nanocrystalline cellulose". Biomacromolecules. 7 (9): 2522–2530. doi:10.1021/bm0602886. ISSN 1525-7797. PMID 16961313. Wikidata Q80232341.
