= Suning Wang =

Chinese-born Canadian chemist (1958–2020)

- Wang Suning
- Born: September 19, 1958; China
- Died: April 27, 2020 (aged 61)
- Education: Yale University (Ph.D); Jilin University (B.Sc)
- Awards: Alcan Award (2007); Killam Research Fellowship (2012, 2013, 2014)
- Scientific career
- Fields: Chemistry
- Workplaces: Queen's University
- Doctoral advisor: Richard Adams

Suning Wang (September 19, 1958 – April 27, 2020) was a Chinese-born Canadian chemist. She was a Professor of Chemistry, Research Chair and head of the Wang Group at Queen's University, Canada, having joined the Department of Chemistry at Queen's University in 1996. Wang worked on the development of new Organometallic chemistry and luminescent materials chemistry. Her research interests also included the work on organic Photovoltaics and Nanoparticle, stimuli-responsive materials as well as OLEDs. Wang and her group developed a simple method of producing graphene-like lattice through light exposure, which may contribute to a huge field of future use. Wang held several patents related to the application of luminescent compounds and boron compounds.

Wang co-authored over 285 publications. Wang was a fellow of the Royal Society of Chemistry and a fellow of the Chemical Institute of Canada. In 2007, Wang received the Alcan Award for her extraordinary devotions to Organic chemistry. In 2015, she was elected Fellow of the Royal Society of Canada. Wang was awarded a Killam Research Fellowship from Canada Council for the Arts.

In 2019, Wang was nominated for and was recognized as a distinguished professor at Queen's University. The Distinguished Professor Program was created to celebrate some of the university's top internationally-recognized researchers.

== Education and early life ==
Suning Wang was born on September 19, 1958. In 1982, she received her Bachelor Degree of Science in Chemistry at Jilin University in China. Later, she pursued a doctoral degree supervised by Richard Adams of Yale University in 1986, followed by Postdoctoral Fellow with John Fackler, Jr. of Texas A&M University from 1986 to 1989.

== Key Research Contributions ==
=== Photochromic and Photo-Responsive Materials ===
Wang led her group to discover new ways of photo- or thermal reactions by developing new ligand frameworks to create color-switching materials. For example, they found that a double mesitylene-elimination reaction with exciton-driven elimination known as EDE transforms some types of BN-heterocycles to BN-pyrenes, which can be used as emitters for EL devices. The phenomenon has the potential for new OLEDs or OFETs materials. Wang and her group focused on providing alternatives to polycyclic systems and their transformations with easily processable precursor species. In 2017, Wang published a simpler method to break the C-C bond in naphthalene and its derivatives to transform them into benzoborepin. This method of synthesis helps make new borepin systems applicable in the field of organic materials.

=== Luminescent and Charge-Transport Materials for OLEDs ===
Wang, together with her group, developed several luminescents and charge-transport materials with improved emission efficiencies, stability and color variety.

In 2016, she found a binary composite with Eu(III) and Tb(III), which can be used as an efficient and bright source for white light. In the area of Phosphorescent OLED (PHOLED), she partnered to discover a high triplet energy platform and a double emissive zone where a high-performance Pt-Based Greenish Blue PHOLED can be made. In 2013, she was involved in a project where a high efficient green-yellowish emitter for simple 3-component PHOLED is enabled with Complex Ir(MDQ)2(Bpz).
