= Julie Hlavacek-Larrondo =

Canadian astrophysicist

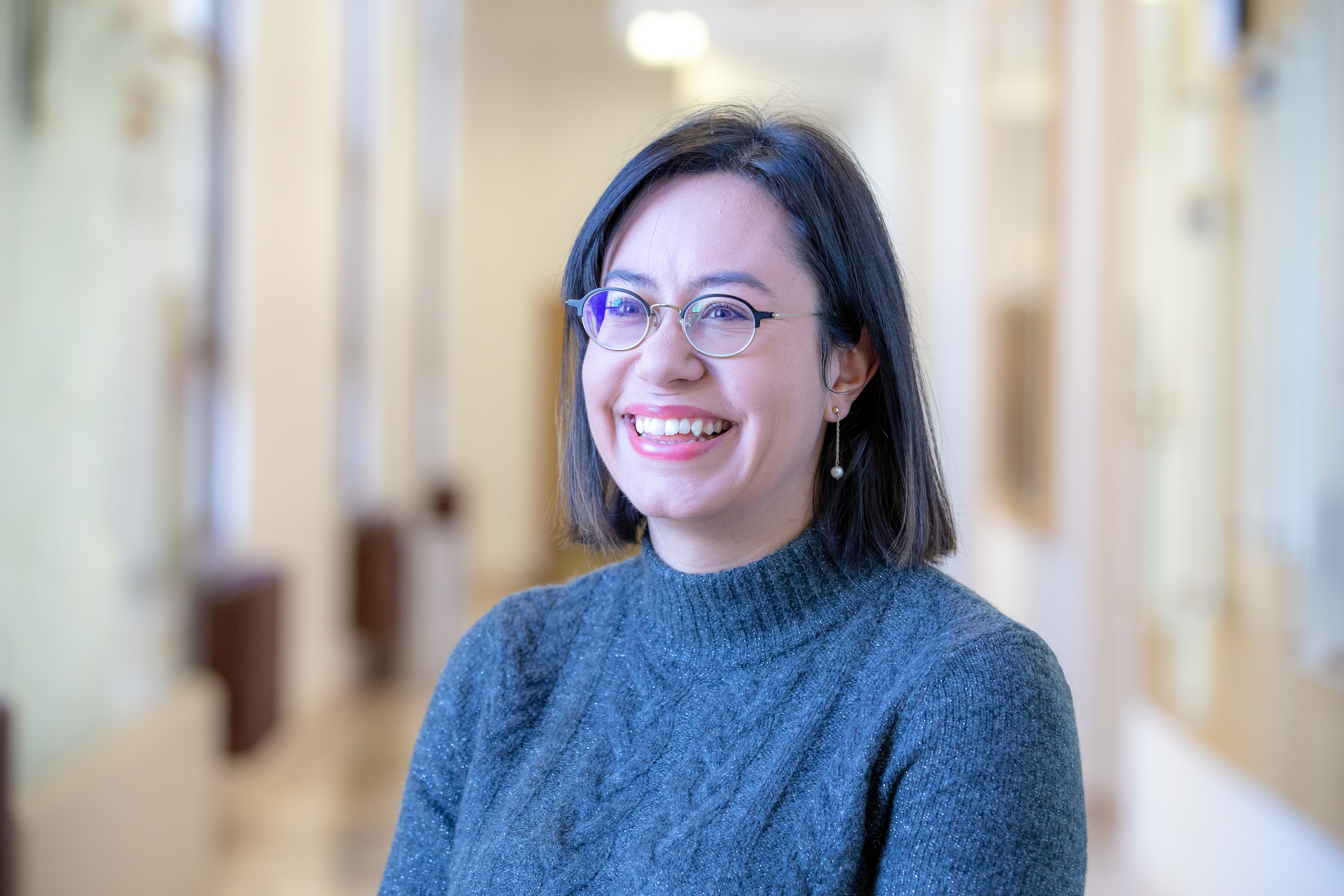
Hlavacek-Larrondo in 2019

Julie Hlavacek-Larrondo is a Canadian astrophysicist who studies supermassive black holes in galaxies and the X-ray cavities in galaxy clusters caused by active galactic nuclei. She is an associate professor of physics at the Université de Montréal, where she holds a Canada Research Chair in Observational Astrophysics of Black Holes.

== Education and career ==
Hlavacek-Larrondo grew up in Montreal, of mixed Czech and Chilean ancestry. Her mother, Lidia Larrondo, worked as a chemist after studying in Russia and escaping to Canada from the 1973 Chilean coup d'état. Hlavacek-Larrondo was a student at the Université de Montréal, where she received her bachelor's and master's degrees. Her master's degree work focused on the kinematics of the Sculptor Group of galaxies. She completed her Ph.D. in astrophysics at the University of Cambridge, in 2012, studying supermassive black holes under the supervision of Andrew Fabian.

After postdoctoral research as an Einstein Fellow at Stanford University, she returned to the Université de Montréal in 2013, and was given her Canada Research Chair in Observational Astrophysics of Black Holes in 2014. The chair was renewed in 2020.

In 2014, she co-founded the project "Parité physique" (later enlarged to "Parité science") to increase the participation of women in physics and science.

== Recognition ==
Hlavacek-Larrondo was a recipient of the Montreal-based Prix ACFAS in 2017. She was the inaugural recipient of the prix Étoile montante du FRQNT of the Fonds de recherche du Québec – Nature et technologies, and the 2024 recipient of the CAP Herzberg Medal of the Canadian Association of Physicists, "in recognition of her leadership role in the study of super-massive black-holes in galactic clusters, and the innovative use of artificial intelligence (AI) in the analysis of massive quantities of astrophysical data". She was the 2025 recipient of the Harvey B. Richer Gold Medal of the Canadian Astronomical Society.

In 2018, she was elected to the College of New Scholars, Artists and Scientists of the Royal Society of Canada.
