= C/1986 P1 (Wilson) =

Parabolic comet

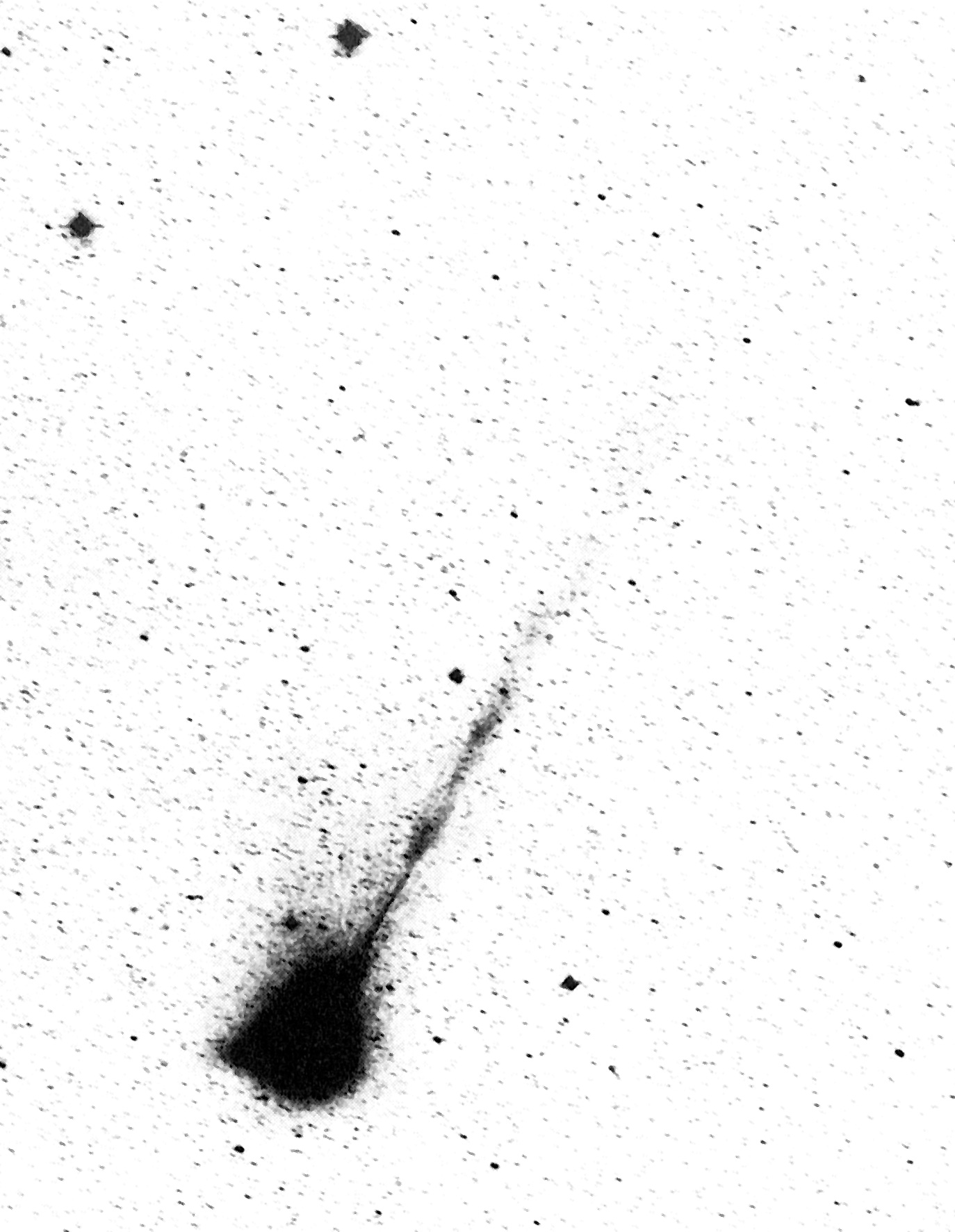
- Wilson's Comet photographed by the European Southern Observatory on 28 March 1987.

Discovery
- Discovered by: Christine D. Wilson
- Discovery site: Palomar Observatory
- Discovery date: 5 August 1986

Designations
- Alternative designations: 1987 VII, 1986l

Orbital characteristics
- Epoch: 29 January 1987 (JD 2446824.5)
- Observation arc: 2.68 years
- Earliest precovery date: 4 August 1986
- Number of observations: 671
- Perihelion: 1.199 AU
- Eccentricity: 1.00031
- Inclination: 147.12°
- Longitude of ascending node: 111.67°
- Argument of periapsis: 238.31°
- Mean anomaly: –0.0003°
- Last perihelion: 20 April 1987
- Earth MOID: 0.391 AU
- Jupiter MOID: 0.027 AU

Physical characteristics
- Mean radius: < 5.0–7.0 km (A) (upper limit)
- Geometric albedo: 0.04 (assumed)
- Comet total magnitude (M1): 5.3
- Comet nuclear magnitude (M2): 11.8
- Apparent magnitude: 4.8 (1987 apparition)

Comet Wilson, formally designated as C/1986 P1, is a non-periodic comet that was observed to split into two fragments in February 1988. It is the only comet discovered by Canadian–American physicist, Christine D. Wilson.

== Observational history ==
=== Discovery ===
The comet was a 10th-magnitude object located within the constellation Pegasus upon discovery on 5 August 1986. (Note: Reported initial position upon discovery was: α = 22^{h} 24.6^{m} , δ = 25° 26′) Christine D. Wilson described the new comet as a diffuse object with a short tail pointed towards the southeast. Prediscovery images taken a day prior helped to verify the comet's existence and have follow-up observations to be conducted.

=== Follow-up observations ===
Infrared imagery conducted in March 1987 has determined that comet Wilson has produced about seven times more dust than 21P/Giacobini–Zinner did during its 1985 apparition, but only half the average production to that of 1P/Halley, however it is later determined that it has not yet developed a dust mantle around its nucleus.
