= Christine Wilson (scientist) =

Canadian-American physicist and astronomer

- Education: University of Toronto; California Institute of Technology
- Scientific career
- Fields: Astronomy, Physics
- Workplaces: McMaster University
- Thesis: Star formation and the interstellar medium in M33 (1990)
- Doctoral advisor: Nicholas Z. Scoville

Christine D. Wilson is a Canadian-American physicist and astronomer, currently a University Distinguished Professor at McMaster University.

On August 5, 1986, Wilson discovered a comet, later named Comet Wilson (1987 VII) after her, while analyzing photographic plates from the Samuel Oschin telescope at the Palomar Observatory.

== Early life and education ==
Wilson is dual citizen of Canada and the United States. She completed her bachelor's degree, majoring in physics, at the University of Toronto prior to graduate studies at the California Institute of Technology (Caltech). In 1986, while working for the summer as part of the Palomar Sky Survey, Wilson discovered a comet on August 5 while examining a photographic plate of a field of faint galaxies. She was 24 years old at the time of her discovery. Following convention, upon confirmation of her discovery, the comet was named Comet Wilson (1987VII). Wilson attended the California Institute of Technology where she studied the interstellar medium in the galaxy M33 with her research advisor Nick Scoville. She graduated with a PhD in Astronomy in 1990.

== Career and research ==
In 1992, Wilson moved to McMaster University where she is currently a University Distinguished Professor. Her research is in observational astronomy, with a particular focus on the optical and radio regions. Most of her work is focused on various components of star formation and the molecular interstellar medium, and has included use of the Atacama Large Millimeter Array (ALMA), James Clerk Maxwell Telescope, Herschel Space Observatory, and the Submillimeter Array (SMA). Wilson is the principal investigator for three international projects associated with these telescope arrays, including the Nearby Galaxies Legacy Survey through the James Clerk Maxwell Telescope, the Very Nearby Galaxies Survey from the Herschel Space Observatory, and the Submillimeter Array's Luminous Infrared Galaxies Survey. She is also the lead for the Herschel Key Project, which examined nearby galaxies to characterize interstellar dust. Furthermore, Wilson is an Associate Canadian Scientist for the Herschel Space Observatory's SPIRE instrument. From 1999 to 2014, Wilson also served as the Canadian Project Scientist for ALMA.

Wilson is a current member of the International Astronomical Union (IAU). On September 9, 2013, Wilson was inducted to the Royal Society of Canada for her accomplishments as a Fellow of the Academy of Science. She was also awarded a Killam Research Fellowship for her work on dense gas star formation in galaxies using archival data from the Atacama Large Millimeter Array. Wilson also serves as a member of the Board of Trustees of Associate Universities.

== Awards and recognition ==
- 1992 - Women's Faculty Award from the Natural Science and Engineering Research Council
- 1999 - Ontario Premier's Research Excellence Award
- 2013 - Fellow of the Academy of Science, Royal Society of Canada
- 2015 - McMaster Distinguished University Professor
- 2022 - Executive Award for Outstanding Service from the Canadian Astronomical Society
- 2022-2023 - Acting President of the Canadian Astronomical Society

== Public engagement ==
During the International Year of Astronomy (2009), Wilson was a Galileo Lecturer which entailed presenting a number of public talks around her work as part of the outreach initiative, the Galileo Lecture Series.
