= Ebrahim Karimi (physicist) =

Iranian-Canadian optical physicist

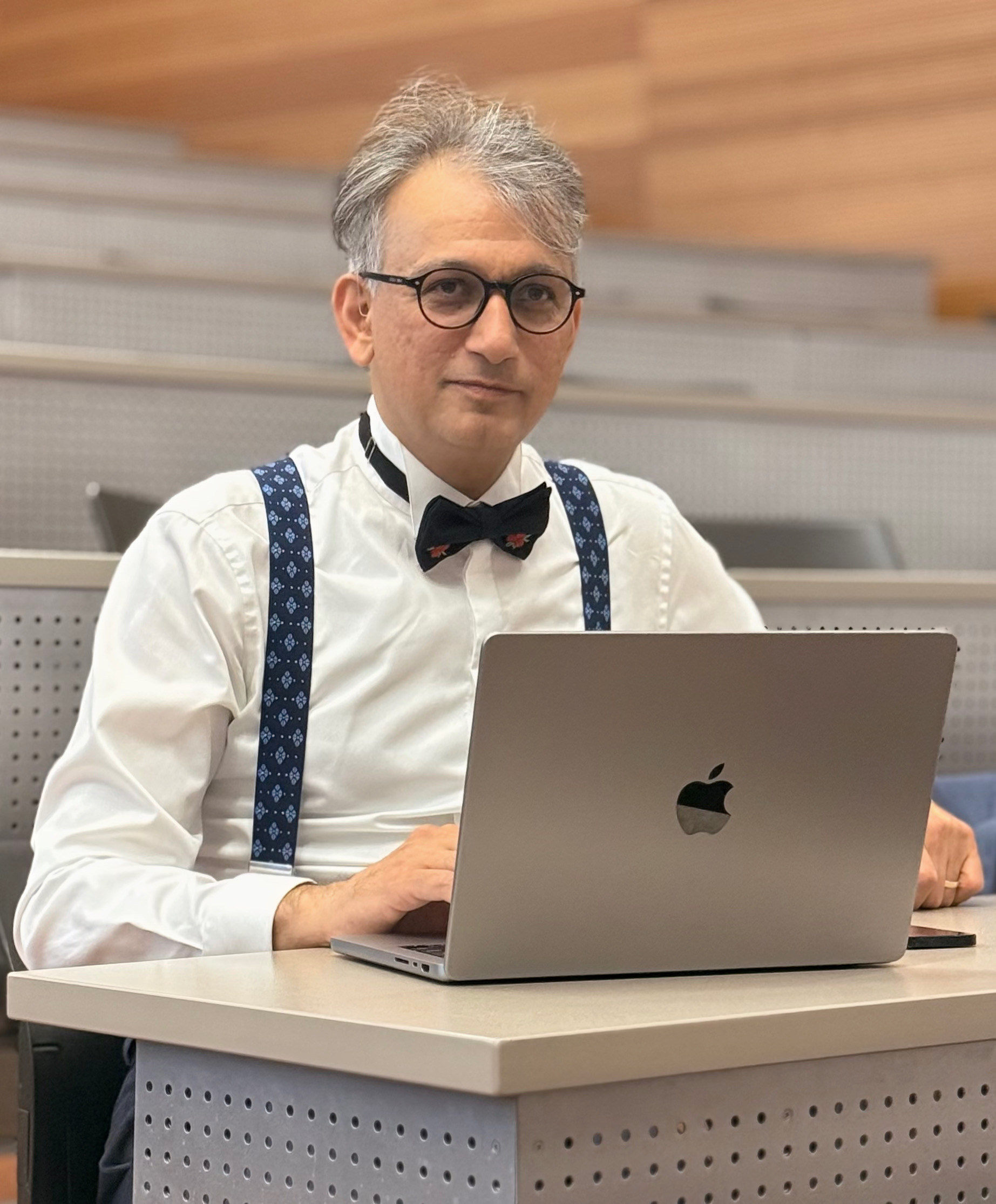
- Born: 1978 (age 47–48); Saqqez, Kurdistan, Iran
- Awards: Rutherford Memorial Medal (2023); Herzberg Medal (2020)

Academic background
- Education: IASBS (MSc); University of Naples Federico II (PhD)
- Thesis: Generation and Manipulation of Laser Beams Carrying Orbital Angular Momentum for Classical and Quantum Information Applications (2009)

Academic work
- Discipline: Physics; Quantum Optics; Photonics; Optical physics
- Institutions: University of Ottawa; Chapman University
- Website: www.sqogroup.ca

Ebrahim Karimi (Kurdish: Îbrahîm Kerîmî; Persian: ابراهیم کریمی; born 1978 in Saqqez, Kurdistan Province) is an Iranian-Canadian quantum scientist at University of Ottawa and Chapman University. He is the Canada Research Chair in Structured Waves and Quantum Communication.

== Biography ==
Karimi was born into a Kurdish family in the city of Saqqez, located in Iran’s Kurdistan Province. Karimi grew up amid the Iran-Iraq War in the 1980s and completed his early education in his hometown of Saqqez and received his Diplomat from Iqbal Lahouri highschool, before joining Department of Physics at Kerman University in 1997. He received his B.Sc. in Physics with emphasis on mathematics from Kerman University in 2001. He began his graduate studies in the mathematical physics group at IASBS, obtaining 18th place in Iran's University Entrance Exam. Later, he shifted his research focus and under the supervision of Yousef Sobouti, completing his thesis on "Laser Cooling and Trapping of Natural Atoms", and receiving his M.Sc. in optics in 2003. During this time, he also collaborated on singular optics with Mohammad Taghi Tavassoli and H. M. Khalesifard. In 2009, he earned his PhD from the University of Naples Federico II supervised by Lorenzo Marrucci and Enrico Santamato, and received the award for best PhD thesis for his work on Light Orbital Angular Momentum and Its applications in classical and quantum information. After completing his PhD, he worked as a postdoctoral fellow with Marrucci and Santamato in Naples. In September 2012, he joined Robert W. Boyd's quantum optics group at University of Ottawa as a postdoctoral fellow. He became assistant professor of physics at Ottawa in 2015, and associate professor in 2020. In 2023 He was the recipient of Rutherford Memorial Medal from the Royal Society of Canada.

== Work ==
In 2017, Karimi and collaborators reported advances in quantum communication. They demonstrated optimal quantum cloning of high-dimensional states, providing a framework to assess the security of such channels against eavesdropping. In the same year, his team demonstrated high-dimensional quantum key distribution over an urban free-space link in Ottawa, achieving information rates exceeding one bit per photon.

In 2019, Karimi's team at Ottawa has successfully developed and operated the first quantum simulator specifically designed to model cyclic (ring-shaped) quantum systems. The team used individual photons—quantum of light—to simulate the quantum behavior of electrons in rings composed of varying numbers of atoms. The experimental results revealed that the physics governing ring-shaped systems differs fundamentally from that of linear (line-shaped) systems.

== Honors and awards ==
- 2020: Herzberg Prize in Physics
- 2023: Rutherford Memorial Medal, For achievements in Quantum Science and Technology

=== Fellowships ===
- 2018: Optica Fellow
- 2019: Visiting Fellow Award from Max Planck Institute for the Science of Light
- 2022: Arthur B. McDonald Fellowship from Natural Sciences and Engineering Research Council of Canada
- 2026: SPIE Fellow
