= Chemistry of Materials =

- Discipline: Chemistry
- Language: English
- Edited by: Sara E. Skrabalak

Publication details
- History: 1989 to present
- Publisher: American Chemical Society (United States)
- Frequency: biweekly
- Impact factor: 8.6 (2022)

Standard abbreviations
- ISO 4: Chem. Mater.

Indexing
- CODEN: cmatex
- ISSN: 0897-4756 (print); 1520-5002 (web)

Links
- Journal homepage

Chemistry of Materials is a peer-reviewed scientific journal, published since 1989 by the American Chemical Society. It was founded by Leonard V. Interrante, who was the Editor-in-Chief until 2013. Jillian M. Buriak took over as Editor-in-Chief in January 2014. She was followed by Sara E. Skrabalak, who assumed the position of Editor-in-Chief in November 2020.

== Abstracting, indexing, and impact factor ==
According to the Journal Citation Reports, Chemistry of Materials has a 2022 impact factor of 8.6.

It is indexed in the following bibliographic databases:

- Scopus
- Web of Science
- British Library
- CAS Source Index

== See also ==
- ACS Materials Letters
