= RCS2 J2327 =

Extremely massive galaxy cluster

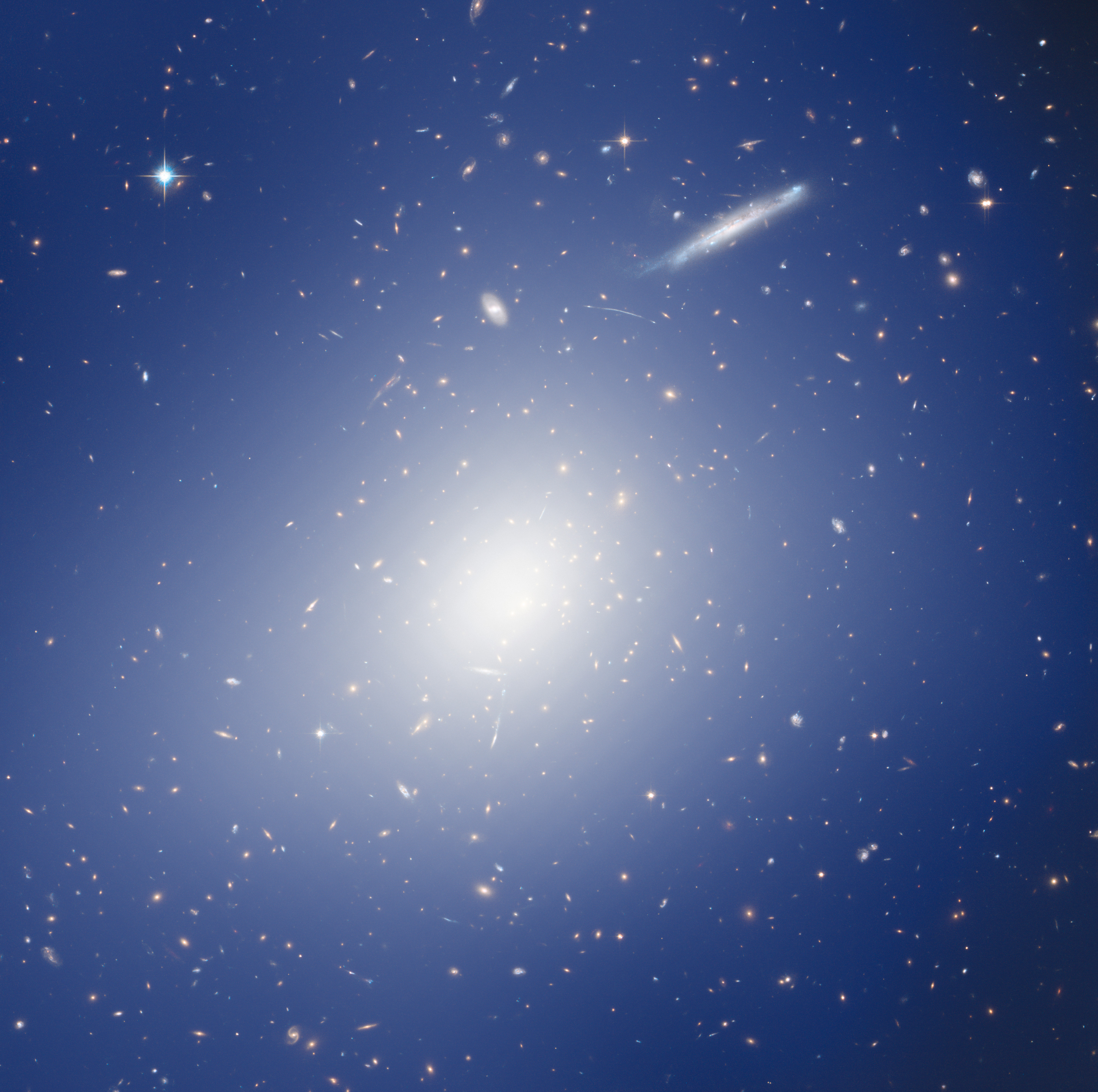
- The galaxy cluster taken by ESO's Very Large Telescope located in Chile, with the blue and white hue representing the mass of the cluster and its regions. The strong gravitational effect creates the impressive image with distorted galaxies, long arcs and a phenomenon which is known as Einstein's Rings. A few faint stars are visible in this picture.

Observation data (Epoch )
- Constellation: Pisces
- Right ascension: 23^{h} 27^{m} 27.60^{s}
- Declination: −02° 04′ 37.4″
- Redshift: 0.6986
- Distance: 6.4 billion ly

Other designations
- ACT-CL J2327.4-0204, PSZ1 G080.66-57.87

RCS2 J2327 (also identified as RCS2 J2327-0204) is an extremely massive galaxy cluster. It is located approximately 6.4 billion light-years away in the constellation of Pisces, thus making it one of the farthest clusters away from Earth. Recent studies have shown that the galaxy cluster has the mass of two quadrillion suns, making it the second-most-massive galaxy cluster. The galaxies are known to be distorted by gravitational lensing, which can have the ability to deflect distort, and amplify the light from the objects behind it. It can also be observed in strong lens, weak lens, and microlens and has 85% invisible dark matter.
