= Curtis P. Berlinguette =

Chemist

- Occupations: Professor & CEO

Academic background
- Education: Texas A&M University; University of Alberta
- Thesis: Nanomagnetic molecular materials based on the hexacyanometallate building block: the preparation and characterization of high-spin cluster and chain compounds (2005)
- Doctoral advisor: Professor Kim R. Dunbar
- Other advisor: Professor Richard H. Holm

Academic work
- Institutions: University of British Columbia
- Main interests: Reactive carbon capture Advanced nuclear fusion Flexible automation Membrane reactors Carbon-neutral building materials
- Website: berlinguettegroup.com

Curtis P. Berlinguette is a Canadian chemist, materials scientist, and entrepreneur known for his research in materials science and clean energy technologies. He holds a faculty position at the University of British Columbia where he is a Professor of Chemistry and Chemical and Biological Engineering. He serves as a CIFAR Program Co-Director in Accelerated Decarbonization and is a Principal Investigator at the Stewart Blusson Quantum Matter Institute. Berlinguette is a Fellow of the Royal Society of Canada. Berlinguette is also a founder of several companies, including Miru (energy-efficient windows), Sora Fuel (decarbonized fuels), CURA Climate (decarbonized cement), and Carbonyx Minerals (carbon-negative materials). His academic research group designs and builds electrochemical reactors to accelerate the discovery and translation of decarbonization technologies.

== Education and career ==
Berlinguette earned his BSc at the University of Alberta in 2000, and his PhD in Inorganic Chemistry at Texas A&M University in 2004 under the supervision of Professor Kim R. Dunbar. After completing his postdoctoral studies at Harvard University with Professor Richard H. Holm, Berlinguette began his independent academic career at the University of Calgary in the Department of Chemistry in 2006. In 2013, Berlinguette joined the University of British Columbia. Berlinguette has co-founded companies (Miru, Sora, CURA, and Carbonyx) to commercialize technologies invented in his labs.

== Research interests ==
Berlinguette’s research program designs and develops electrochemical reactors aimed at accelerating decarbonization. His academic group has advanced a range of clean energy applications, including reactive carbon capture, carbon-neutral building materials, electrification of the chemical industry, and nuclear fusion. His team also built a self-driving laboratory to accelerate clean energy materials research.

== Start-up companies ==
In July 2024, Miru Smart Technologies secured US $20 million in Series A financing supported by BDC Capital, Greensoil Ventures, and others.

In 2024, Berlinguette co-founded Sora Fuel, a startup focused on producing sustainable aviation fuel from atmospheric CO_{2}. In April 2026, Sora Fuel secured US $14.6 million in Seed+ funding.

In 2025, Berlinguette co-founded CURA to decarbonize cement production. Cura secured a pre-Seed investment in late 2025.

In 2026, Berlinguette co-founded Carbonyx to produce carbon-negative materials, such as carbonates, silica, and critical minerals. Carbonyx secured a pre-Seed investment in early 2026.

== Awards and recognitions ==
Berlinguette has received numerous awards and accolades, including:

Canada’s 2023 Clean50 Award (2022)

Fellow of the Royal Society Canada (2021–Present)

UBC Distinguished University Scholar (2021–Present)

CIFAR Program Co-Director for Accelerated Decarbonization (2020-2025)

CSC Award for Research Excellence in Materials Chemistry (2020)

RSC Alex Rutherford Medal for Chemistry (2016)

NSERC E.W.R Steacie Memorial Fellowship (2016-2018)

Strem Chemicals Award for Pure and Inorganic Chemistry (2016)

Tier II Canada Research Chair in Solar Energy Conversion (2014-2019)

Calgary's Top 40 Under 40, Avenue Magazine (2012)

Alfred P. Sloan Fellowship (2011-2013)
