= Atacama Cosmology Telescope =

Telescope in the Atacama Desert, northern Chile

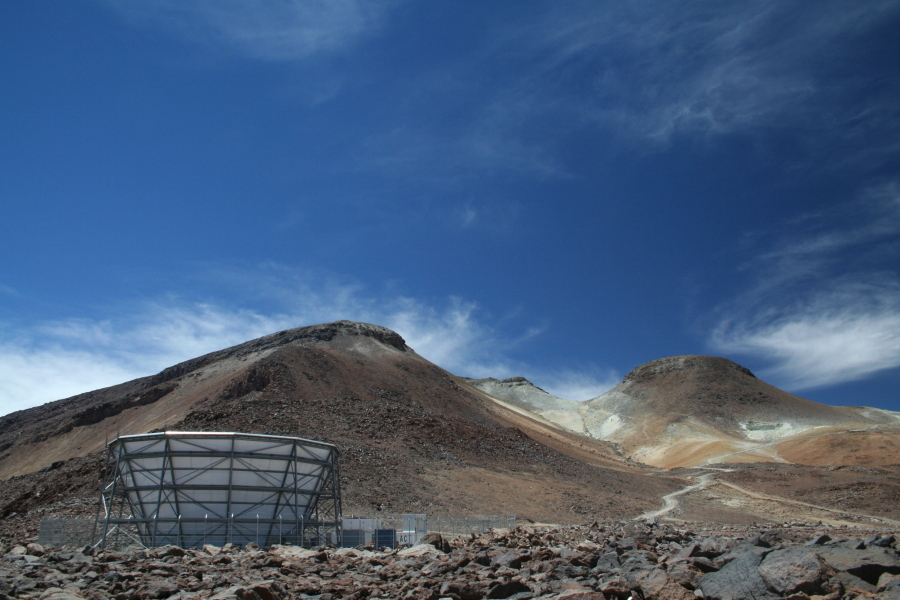
- The Atacama Cosmology Telescope, with Cerro Toco in the background
- Alternative names: ACTpol
- Location: Atacama Desert
- Coordinates: 22°57′31″S 67°47′15″W
- Wavelength: 28, 41, 90, 150, 220 GHz (1.07, 0.73, 0.33, 0.20, 0.14 cm)
- Diameter: 6 meter
- Website: act.princeton.edu
- Location within Chile
- Related media on Commons

The Atacama Cosmology Telescope (ACT) was a cosmological millimeter-wave telescope located on Cerro Toco in the Atacama Desert in the north of Chile. ACT made high-sensitivity, arcminute resolution, microwave-wavelength surveys of the sky in order to study the cosmic microwave background radiation (CMB), the relic radiation left by the Big Bang process. Located 40 km from San Pedro de Atacama, at an altitude of 5,190 metres (17,030 ft), it was one of the highest ground-based telescopes in the world. (Note: The Receiver Lab Telescope (RLT), an 80 cm (31 in) instrument, is higher at 5,525 m (18,125 ft), but is not permanent as it is fixed to the roof of a movable shipping container. The 2009 University of Tokyo Atacama Observatory is significantly higher than both.)

Cosmic microwave background experiments like ACT, the South Pole Telescope, the WMAP satellite, and the Planck satellite have provided foundational evidence for the standard Lambda-CDM model of cosmology. ACT first detected seven acoustic peaks in the power spectrum of the CMB, discovered the most extreme galaxy cluster and made the first statistical detection of the motions of clusters of galaxies via the pairwise kinematic Sunyaev–Zeldovich effect.

ACT was funded by the US National Science Foundation. ACT was built in 2007 and saw first light in October 2007 with its first receiver, the Millimeter Bolometer Array Camera (MBAC). ACT had two major receiver upgrades which enabled polarization sensitive observations: ACTPol (2013–2016) and Advanced ACT (2017–2022). ACT observations ended in mid-2022.

== Science goals ==
Measurements of cosmic microwave background radiation (CMB) by experiments such as COBE, BOOMERanG, WMAP, CBI, the South Pole Telescope and many others, have greatly advanced scientific knowledge of cosmology, particularly in relation to the early evolution of the universe. At the arcminute resolutions probed by ACT, the Sunyaev–Zeldovich effect, by which galaxy clusters leave an imprint on the CMB, is prominent. This method of detection provides a redshift-independent measurement of the mass of the clusters, meaning that very distant, ancient clusters are as relatively easy to detect as nearby clusters.

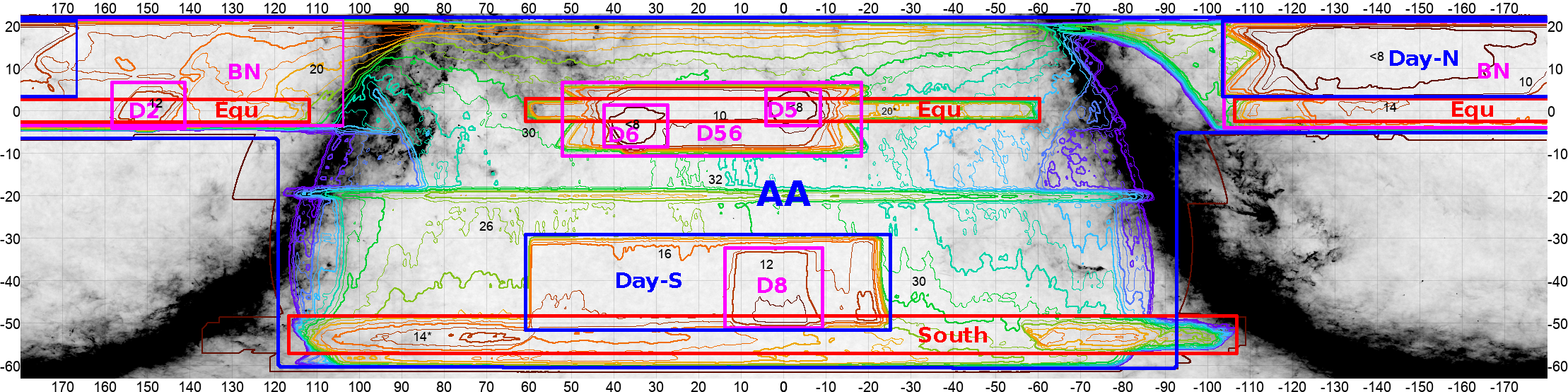
Atacama Cosmology Telescope observing patches and depth map

Detection of galaxy clusters and follow-up measurements in visible and X-ray light provide a picture of the evolution of structure in the universe since the Big Bang. This is used to improve our understanding of the nature of dark energy, one of the major energy components of the universe.

High sensitivity observations of the cosmic microwave background radiation allow precision measurements of cosmological parameters, detection of galaxy clusters among other scientific goals, probing the early and late stages in the history of the evolution of the universe.

== Scientific highlights ==
Throughout its operation, ACT contributed the scientific community with:

- The first detection of seven acoustic peaks in the power spectrum of the CMB.
- First detection of gravitational lensing in a CMB map only.
- First measurement of the cross-correlation between optical quasars and CMB lensing.
- First measurement of the cross correlation between CMB lensing and galaxy lensing.
- Discovery of the most extreme galaxy cluster.
- First measurement of the motions of clusters of galaxies using the kinematic pairwise Sunyaev-Zeldovich effect.
- Provided updated estimates of the Hubble constant.
- Provided evidence of dark energy using CMB data alone.
- First statistical detection of CMB lensing by massive halos.
- First measurement of the motions of clusters of galaxies using the velocity reconstruction method.
- First joint thermal and kinematic Sunyaev–Zeldovich effect galaxy profile measurement.
- A blind search for Planet Nine.

== Location ==
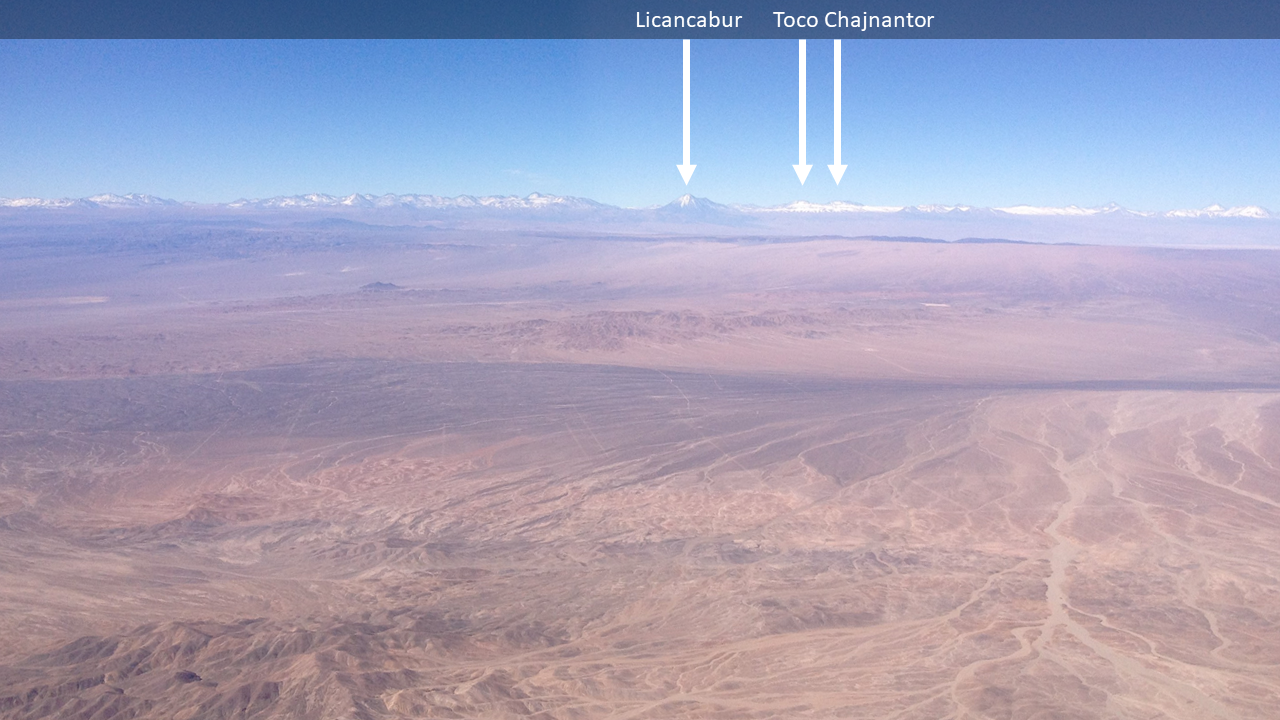
Aerial view of the Andes as seen from the vicinity of Calama, Chile. ACT is located on Cerro Toco, near Cerro Chajnantor and the Licancabur volcano.

Water vapor in the atmosphere emits microwave radiation which contaminates measurements of the CMB, for this reason CMB telescopes benefit from arid, high-altitude locations. ACT is located in the dry and high (yet easily accessible) Chajnantor plateau in the Andean mountains in the Atacama Desert in northern Chile. Due to the exceptional observing conditions of the Atacama Desert and its accessibility by road and nearby ports, several other observatories are located in the region, including CBI, ASTE, Nanten, APEX and ALMA. These astronomical observatories and telescopes form the Llano de Chajnantor Observatory, a cluster of astronomical telescopes primarily in millimeter and sub-millimeter wavelengths.

== Design ==
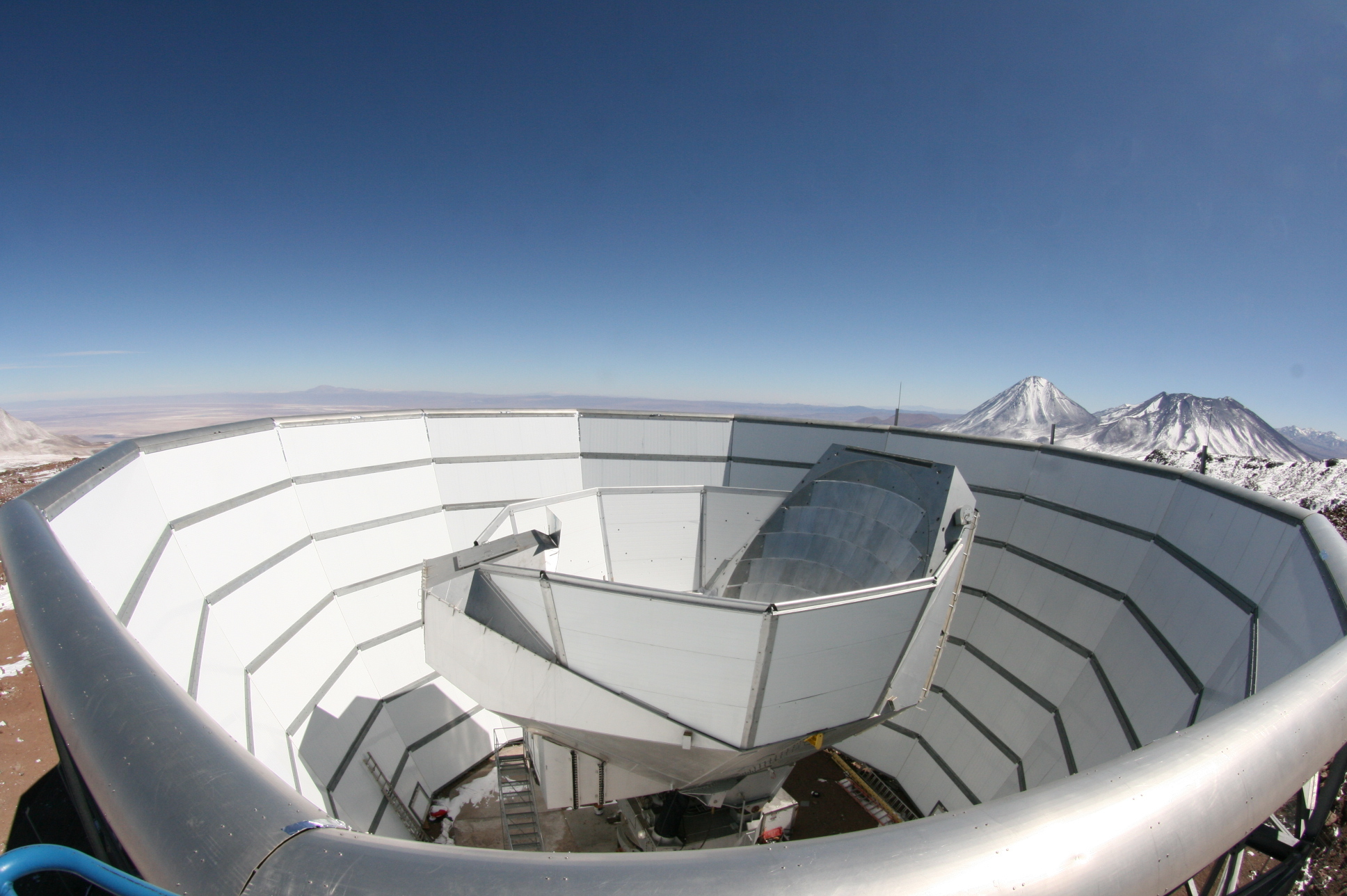
The Atacama Cosmology Telescope viewed from the top of the outer ground screen. The top half of the segmented, primary mirror can be seen above the inner ground screen that moves with the telescope.

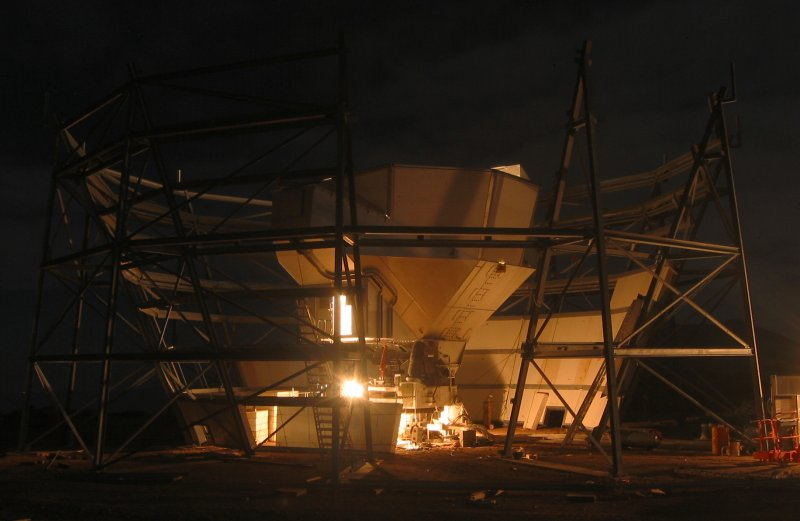
The Atacama Cosmology Telescope. In this picture, the ground screen had not yet been completed, allowing the telescope to be seen.

=== Telescope ===
The ACT is an off-axis Gregorian telescope. This off-axis configuration is beneficial to minimize artifacts in the point spread function. The telescope reflectors consist of a six-metre (236 in) primary mirror and a two-metre (79 in) secondary mirror. Both mirrors are composed of segments, consisting of 71 (primary) and 11 (secondary) aluminum panels. These panels follow the shape of an ellipsoid of revolution and are carefully aligned to form a joint surface. Unlike most telescopes which track the rotating sky during observation, the ACT observes the sky by keeping the telescope oriented at a constant elevation and by scanning back and forth in azimuth at the relatively rapid rate of two degrees per second. The rotating portion of the telescope weighs approximately 32 tonnes (35 short tons), creating a substantial engineering challenge. A ground screen surrounding the telescope blocks contamination from microwave radiation emitted by the ground. The design, manufacture and construction of the telescope were done by Dynamic Structures in Vancouver, British Columbia.

=== Instrument ===
ACT can accommodate three instrument cameras simultaneously. Over time these cameras were upgraded from the original MBAC design to the Advanced ACT instrument progressively adding more features like polarization sensitivity and the ability to sense multiple frequencies in one instrument module. Each camera in ACT consists of a three lens system, the Gregorian focus is reimaged into a detector focal plane, a Lyot stop reimages the primary mirror allowing stray light mitigation.

The three lenses in ACT are made of cryogenically cooled anti-reflection coated silicon, a desirable material for instruments in the millimeter due to its high index of refraction (n=3). Anti-reflection coatings in ACTPol and AdvACT are made of sub-wavelength structured metamaterial silicon, an innovation in ground based CMB telescopes at the time. The optical components and the detector module are kept at a vacuum with a plastic window. A stack of filters reject infra-red radiation which is detrimental for mm-wavelength observations.

Radiation is thermally coupled to transition-edge sensor bolometers, which are read out using an array of SQUIDs.

=== Observations ===
Observations are made at resolutions of about an arcminute (1/60th of a degree) in three frequencies: 145 GHz, 215 GHz and 280 GHz. Each frequency is measured by a 3 cm × 3 cm (1.2 in × 1.2 in), 1024 element array, for a total of 3072 detectors. The detectors are superconducting transition-edge sensors, a technology whose high sensitivity allows measurements of the temperature of the CMB to within a few millionths of a degree. A system of cryogenic helium refrigerators keep the detectors a third of a degree above absolute zero.

=== Detectors ===
ACT has had three generations of cameras. Each camera is the result of the development of specialized detector technology which has been optimized through the years. These cameras take advantage of superconducting transition edge sensor arrays to achieve high sensitivity.

The first array of cameras to populate the ACT focal plane (MBAC) consisted of three cameras where each one was sensitive to its own band and had no polarization sensitivity. The second generation of cameras (ACTPol) added polarization sensitivity and the first camera to be sensitive to two bands (dichroic). The third generation of cameras (AdvACT) incorporated the advances achieved in ACTPol, which allowed all cameras to be sensitive to two bands.

Phase	Arrays	Freq. (GHz)	Sens. (μK√s)	Pol.	Years	Patches
MBAC	ar1	148	30	No	2008–2010	Equ South
MBAC	ar2	217	?	No	2008–2010	Equ South
MBAC	ar3	277	?	No	2010	Equ South
ACTPol	pa1	150	17–29	Yes	2013–2015	D2 D5 D6 D56 D8 BN
ACTPol	pa2	150	13–18	Yes	2014–2016	D2 D5 D6 D56 D8 BN
ACTPol	pa3	90	16	Yes	2015–2016	D2 D5 D6 D56 D8 BN
ACTPol	pa3	150	21–22	Yes	2015–2016	D2 D5 D6 D56 D8 BN
AdvACT	pa4	150	18.2	Yes	2017–2021	AA Day‑N Day‑S
AdvACT	pa4	220	34.1	Yes	2017–2021	AA Day‑N Day‑S
AdvACT	pa5	98	12.5	Yes	2017–2021	AA Day‑N Day‑S
AdvACT	pa5	150	13.9	Yes	2017–2021	AA Day‑N Day‑S
AdvACT	pa6	98	11.3	Yes	2017–2019	AA Day‑N Day‑S
AdvACT	pa6	150	12.6	Yes	2017–2019	AA Day‑N Day‑S
AdvACT	pa7	27	?	Yes	2020–2021	AA Day‑N Day‑S
AdvACT	pa7	39	?	Yes	2020–2021	AA Day‑N Day‑S

== Institutions ==
ACT has collaborators at Princeton University, Cornell University, the University of Pennsylvania, NASA/GSFC, the Johns Hopkins University, the University of British Columbia, NIST, the Pontificia Universidad Católica de Chile, the University of KwaZulu-Natal, Perimeter Institute for Theoretical Physics, the Canadian Institute for Theoretical Astrophysics, Stanford University, Stony Brook University, Cardiff University, Argonne National Laboratory, Haverford College, Rutgers University, the University of Pittsburgh, UC Berkeley, University of Southern California, the University of Oxford, the University of Paris-Saclay, University of Illinois at Urbana-Champaign, SLAC National Accelerator Laboratory, Caltech, McGill University, the Center for Computational Astrophysics, Arizona State University, Columbia University, Carnegie Mellon University, the University of Chicago, Haverford College, Florida State University, West Chester University, Yale University, and the University of Toronto.

== See also ==
- BICEP and Keck Array
- Llano de Chajnantor Observatory
- List of highest astronomical observatories
- Lists of telescopes
