= Canadian Astronomical Society =

Canadian society of professional astronomers

- Abbreviation: CASCA
- Formation: 1971
- Type: NGO
- Purpose: The promotion and advancement of knowledge of the universe through research and education
- Headquarters: 2219 Vancouver Street; Victoria, British Columbia; V8T 4A1
- Members: 565
- Official language: English, French
- President: Christine Wilson (2022 - 2023)
- Past President: Rob Thacker
- Vice President: Adam Muzzin
- Website: https://www.casca.ca

The Canadian Astronomical Society (CASCA; French: La Société Canadienne d'Astronomie) is a Canadian society of professional astronomers, founded in 1971 and incorporated in 1983. The society is devoted to the promotion and advancement of knowledge of the universe through research and education, and its membership is open to people with a professional involvement in astronomy and related sciences.

The main activities of the Society are its annual scientific meetings, the planning and realization of scientific projects, the support of the scientific activities of its members, and the dissemination of related information among members and other interested people.

== History ==
Before World War II, there were few professional astronomers in Canada. There were two government-run, national observatories, the Dominion Observatory, which opened in 1905 in Ottawa, Ontario and the Dominion Astrophysical Observatory, which opened in 1918 in Saanich, British Columbia. In addition, the University of Toronto's David Dunlap Observatory, which opened in 1935 in Richmond Hill, Ontario, housed the only significant university faculty and the only centre for graduate studies in astronomy in Canada.

During this period, the most prominent astronomical organization in Canada was the Royal Astronomical Society of Canada, which counted both amateurs and professional astronomer as members. Canadians also held leadership positions and attended meetings of the American Astronomical Society (AAS). Beginning with Ottawa in 1911, several Canadian cities hosted AAS meetings. Canada was also an early member of the International Astronomical Union, with activities coordinated through the Dominion Observatory.

In the 1960s, university programmes in science expanded rapidly and astronomy groups and departments appeared across Canada. This influx of astronomers, along with the closure of the Dominion Observatory in 1970, created demand for a professional society of Canadian astronomers.

CASCA was founded in May 1971 by a committee of the Canadian government's National Research Council and Helen Sawyer Hogg was elected as the first president. CASCA was incorporated in 1983 as a society of professional astronomers.

== Publications ==
The quarterly newsletter of the Society, called Cassiopeia is published at equinoxes and solstices.

== See also ==
- Petrie Prize Lecture
