= List of Université de Montréal people =

The following is a list of noted principals, alumni and professors of Université de Montréal.

== Rectors ==
| Years in office | Principal |
|---|---|
| 1920–1923 | M^{gr} Georges Gauthier |
| 1923–1934 | M^{gr} André-Vincent-Joseph Piette |
| 1934–1955 | M^{gr} Olivier Maurault |
| 1955–1965 | M^{gr} Irénée Lussier |
| 1965–1975 | Roger Gaudry |
| 1975–1985 | Paul Lacoste |
| 1985–1993 | Gilles Cloutier |
| 1993–1998 | René Simard |
| 1998–2005 | Robert Lacroix |
| 2005–2010 | Luc Vinet |
| 2010 – current | Guy Breton |

== Faculty ==
- Ishfaq Ahmad, visiting professor of theoretical physics (1960–1966; 1996–1999)
- Yoshua Bengio, computer scientist noted for work in artificial neural networks and deep learning
- Stéphane Dion, former professor of political science, leader of the Liberal Party of Canada (2006–2008)
- Jocelyn Faubert, professor in the School of Optometry, Director of the Psychophysics and Visual Perception Laboratory
- David Feuerwerker, former professor of sociology (1966–1968) and founder of the department of Jewish studies
- Pierrette Gaudreau, director of the neuroendocrinology lab at the CHUM and aging specialist.
- E. Mark Gold, Departement d'Informatique (c.1972–1978)
- Lionel Groulx, former professor of history
- Hubert Lacroix, associate professor at the Faculty of Law
- Jean-Daniel Lafond, former professor and former Viceregal consort of Canada
- Georges Larivière, former director the Faculty of Physical education, writer, ice hockey coach
- Jean-François Lisée, visiting scholar (2001–2002), political advisor and former executive director for the Center for International Studies, former Parti Québécois leader and leader of the Official opposition at the Quebec's National Assembly
- Louise Nadeau, professor of psychology
- Vardit Ravitsky, professor of bioethics
- Michel Seymour, professor of philosophy
- James R. Taylor, professor emeritus at the department of communication
- Dale C. Thomson, former professor and departmental director, who also served as professor and Vice-Principal of McGill University
- Jeannine Vanier, former professor of music

== Noted alumni ==
An Order of Merit is appointed to particularly successful alumni on an annual basis.

=== Nobel laureates ===
- Roger Guillemin, Nobel Prize laureate (Medicine, 1977)

=== Academics, scientists and scholars ===
- Ishfaq Ahmad, nuclear physicist and one of the pioneers of Pakistan's atomic bomb project
- Katharine Banham, first woman to be awarded Ph.D. from Université de Montréal in psychology
- André Barbeau, neurologist
- Gilles Brassard, known for his fundamental work in quantum cryptography, quantum teleportation, quantum entanglement distillation, quantum pseudo-telepathy, and the classical simulation of quantum entanglement
- Judith R. Cohen, ethnomusicologist, music educator, and performer
- Charles Howard Curran, entomologist
- Sylvie Cloutier, molecular geneticist
- Francine Descarries, sociologist
- Micheline Dumont (historian), historian
- Jocelyn Faubert, psychophysicist best known for his work in the fields of visual perception
- David Feuerwerker. founder of the department of Jewish studies at Université de Montréal
- Armand Frappier, physician and microbiologist
- Dominique Gaspard, American-born Canadian physician and founding member of the Negro Community Centre of Montreal
- Jacques Genest, physician and scientist
- Alice Girard, first woman dean at this university
- Ian Goodfellow, computer scientist noted for developing generative adversarial networks
- Jan Grabowski, historian
- Mustapha Ishak Boushaki, physician and scientist
- Normand Landry, professor of communication at Université TÉLUQ and current Canada Research Chair in Media Education and Human Rights
- Corinne Le Quéré, professor of climate change science
- André Lussier, pioneer of clinical and scientific rheumatology in Canada
- Brenda Milner, British-Canadian neuropsychologist who has contributed extensively to the field of clinical neuropsychology
- Carolyn Muessig, medievalist specializing in sermon literature, female education, and hagiography
- Gaston Nguérékata, Central African mathematician
- Gilles Paradis (M.D.), public health and preventive medicine physician at the Institut national de santé publique du Québec, as well as professor in the Department of Epidemiology, Biostatistics, and Occupational Health and Strathcona Chair in Epidemiology at McGill University.
- Amélie Quesnel-Vallée (M.Sc. 2000), Associate Professor with joint appointment in the Departments of Sociology and Epidemiology, and Canada Research Chair in Policies and Health Inequalities at McGill University
- Suzanna Randall, German astrophysicist and private astronaut candidate
- Hubert Reeves, astrophysicist
- Benoît Roux, Amgen Professor of Biochemistry and Molecular Biophysics at the University of Chicago
- Camille Sandorfy, quantum chemist
- Hans Selye, pioneering Hungarian-Canadian endocrinologist
- Daniel Thalmann, pioneer in virtual humans
- Rodrigue Tremblay, Canadian economist, humanist and political figure

=== Business and media ===
- Philippe de Gaspé Beaubien, CEO of Telemedia
- Louis R. Chênevert, CEO of United Technologies Corporation
- Patrice Désilets, Canadian game designer best known for creating the Assassin's Creed series
- Arnaud Détrans, Head of General Mills Canadian Division
- Lise Fournel, CIO of Air Canada
- Pierre Lassonde, businessman and philanthropist
- Pierre Nadeau (1936–2019), Canadian journalist, television presenter and producer
- Pierre Karl Péladeau, CEO of Quebecor
- Denis Pisonneault, COO of Via Rail Canada
- Calin Rovinescu, CEO of Air Canada
- Arthur Surveyor, founder of engineering and construction conglomerate SNC-Lavalin Group Inc

=== Law ===
- Louise Arbour, Supreme Court of Canada Justice (1999–2004), UN High Commissioner for Human Rights (2004–2008), Governor General of Canada (2026–present)
- Maurice Archambault, lawyer and judge
- Michel Bastarache, Supreme Court of Canada Justice (1997–2008)
- Marie Deschamps, Supreme Court of Canada Justice (2002–2012)
- Jules Deschênes, Canadian Quebec Superior Court judge
- Johanne Gauthier, judge currently serving on the Federal Court of Appeal
- Antonio Lamer, Supreme Court of Canada Chief Justice (1990–2000)
- Herbert Marx, lawyer, university law professor, politician, and judge

=== Politics and government ===
- Stéphanie Allard-Gomez, diplomat
- Vincent Auclair, MNA for the Vimont riding
- Jean-Martin Aussant, MNA for the Nicolet-Yamaska riding
- Raymond Bachand, politician and finance minister of the Quebec Liberal Party
- Line Beauchamp, politician and member of the Quebec Liberal Party
- Denise Beaudoin, politician and member of the Parti Québécois
- Ahmed Benbitour, Algerian politician
- Josephat T. Benoit, nine-term Mayor of Manchester, New Hampshire
- Jean-Jacques Bertrand, Premier of Quebec (1968–1970)
- André Boisclair, leader of the Parti Québécois (2005–2007)
- Robert Bourassa, Premier of Quebec (1970–1976, 1985–1994)
- Jean Carle, civil servant and executive
- François-Philippe Champagne, MP for Saint-Maurice—Champlain
- Pierre Dalphond, Canadian senator
- Maurice Duplessis, Premier of Quebec (1936–1939, 1944–1959)
- Pierre Dupuy, diplomat and writer
- Jean-Pierre Goyer, Canadian Cabinet minister
- Lomer Gouin, Premier of Quebec (1905–1920)
- Michaëlle Jean, journalist, Governor General of Canada
- Daniel Johnson, Jr., Premier of Quebec (1994)
- Daniel Johnson, Sr., Premier of Quebec (1966–1968)
- Pierre-Marc Johnson, Premier of Quebec (1985)
- Amir Khadir, MNA and spokesperson for Québec solidaire
- Bernard Landry, Premier of Quebec (2001–2003)
- Camille Laurin, psychiatrist and Quebec politician
- Denis Lazure, psychiatrist and Quebec politician
- Georges-Émile Lapalme, leader of the Quebec Liberal Party (1950–1958)
- Elsie Lefebvre, MNA for the Laurier-Dorion riding
- Jacques Parizeau, Premier of Quebec (1994–1996)
- Paul Sauvé, Premier of Quebec (1959–1960)
- Pierre Eliott Trudeau, Prime Minister of Canada (1968–1979, 1980–1984)

=== Arts, music and film ===
- Anne-Marie Alonzo, playwright, poet and critic
- Hubert Aquin, novelist and filmmaker
- Denys Arcand, filmmaker
- Ashot Ariyan, composer and pianist
- Angèle Bassolé-Ouédraogo, poet and journalist
- Yves Beauchemin, novelist
- Gérard Caron, organist and pianist
- Françoise de Clossey, pianist and organist
- Christiane Duchesne, researcher, educator, illustrator, translator and writer
- Gad Elmaleh, French-Moroccan stand-up comedian and actor
- Dédé Fortin, singer
- Suzanne Jacob, novelist, poet, playwright, singer-songwriter, and critic
- Blanche Lamontagne-Beauregard, first published female poet in Quebec
- Marquise Lepage, producer, screenwriter, and film and television director
- Philippe Malouin, artist and designer
- Gaston Miron, important poet, writer, and editor of Quebec's Quiet Revolution
- Jean Saulnier, pianist
- Esther Valiquette, documentary film director
- Jeannine Vanier, composer and organist
- Xue Yiwei, Chinese writer resident in Montreal
- Yu Jia Zhai, singer and dancer of idol group AKB48 Team SH

=== Sports ===
- Marc-Antoine Dequoy, NFL player
- Fatima El-Faquir, sprinter, first Moroccan to compete in the Olympics
- Charles Mayer (1922), journalist, sportsperson and politician
- Anne Montminy, competitive diver, lawyer

=== Others ===
- Mohamed Diriye Abdullahi, linguist and translator
- Marguerite Andersen, writer and educator
- Maxime Arseneau, radio host
- Abderraouf Jdey, alleged terrorist
- Grace Kodindo, obstetrician-gynecologist
- Joanne Liu, former head of Médecins sans frontières (MSF, or Doctors Without Borders)
- Victor-David Mbuyi Bipungu, Anglican bishop
- Isabelle Mercier, professional poker player
- Lucille Teasdale-Corti, surgeon and international humanitarian aid worker
