= Ali Akbar Saboury =

Iranian biochemist

Ali-Akbar Saboury
- علی‌اکبر صبوری
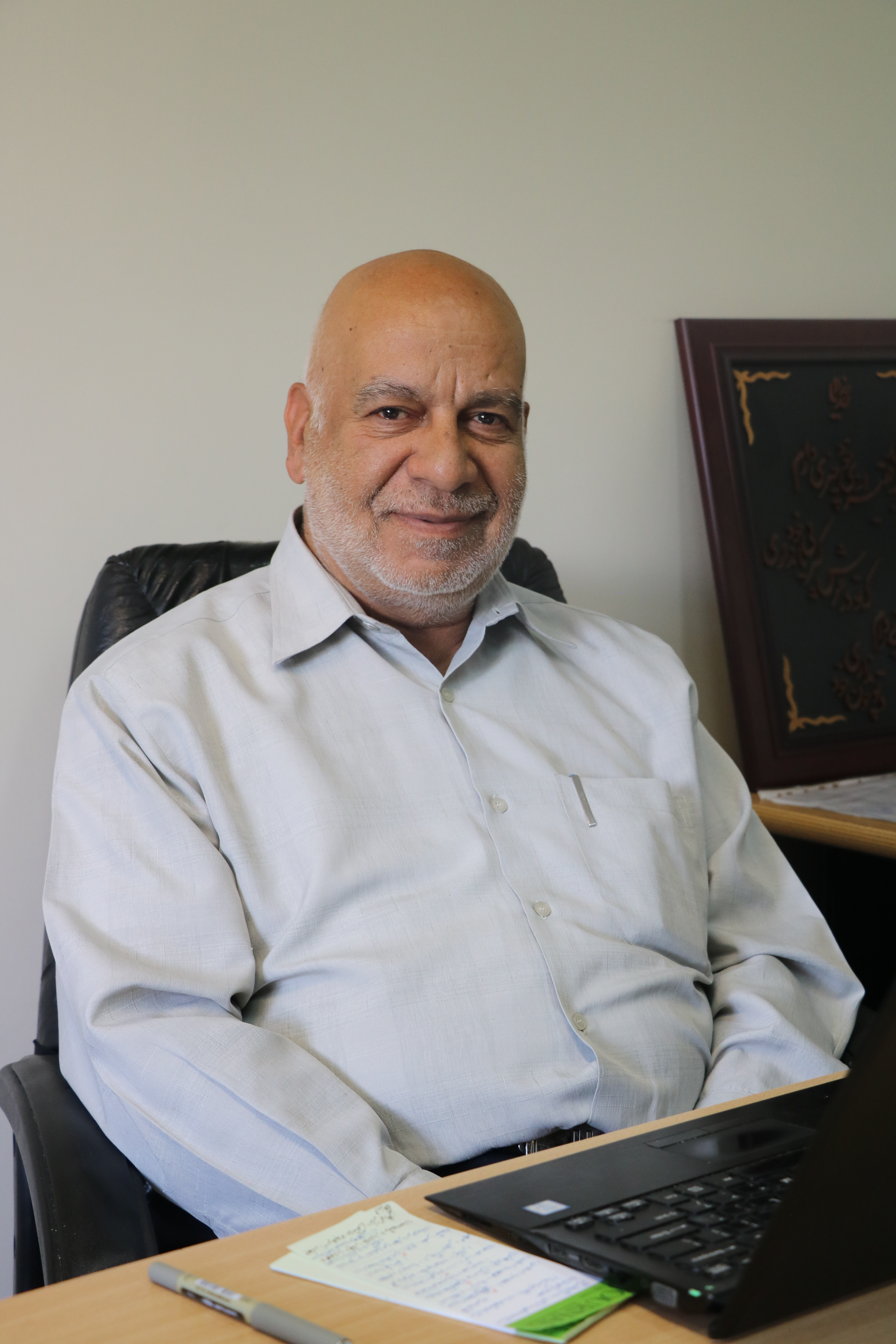
- Born: July 1960 (age 65); Kashmar, Iran
- Scientific career
- Fields: biochemistry
- Institutions: University of Tehran
- Website: a.a.saboury.net

Ali-Akbar Saboury (Persian: علی‌اکبر صبوری; born July 1960) is an Iranian biochemist and Distinguished Professor of Biophysical Chemistry at the University of Tehran. He is known for his works on biothermodynamics, enzyme kinetics and calorimetry.

== Books ==
- Chemical Thermodynamics, with Ali Akbar Mousavi Movahedi, Tehran: University of Tehran Press
