= Bianca Dittrich =

Bianca Dittrich may refer to:

- Bianca Dittrich (gymnast) (born 1967), German retired rhythmic gymnast
- Bianca Dittrich (physicist) (born 1977), German theoretical physicist
