= Harnad =

Harnad is a surname. Notable people with the surname include:

- John Harnad, Hungarian mathematical physicist
- Stevan Harnad (born 1945), Hungarian cognitive scientist
