= Paul Lacoste =

Paul Lacoste may refer to:

- Paul Lacoste (academic) (1923–2009), Canadian academic
- Paul Lacoste (Canadian football) (born 1974), former CFL player
