= Pavel Winternitz =

Czech-Canadian mathematical-physicist (1936–2021)

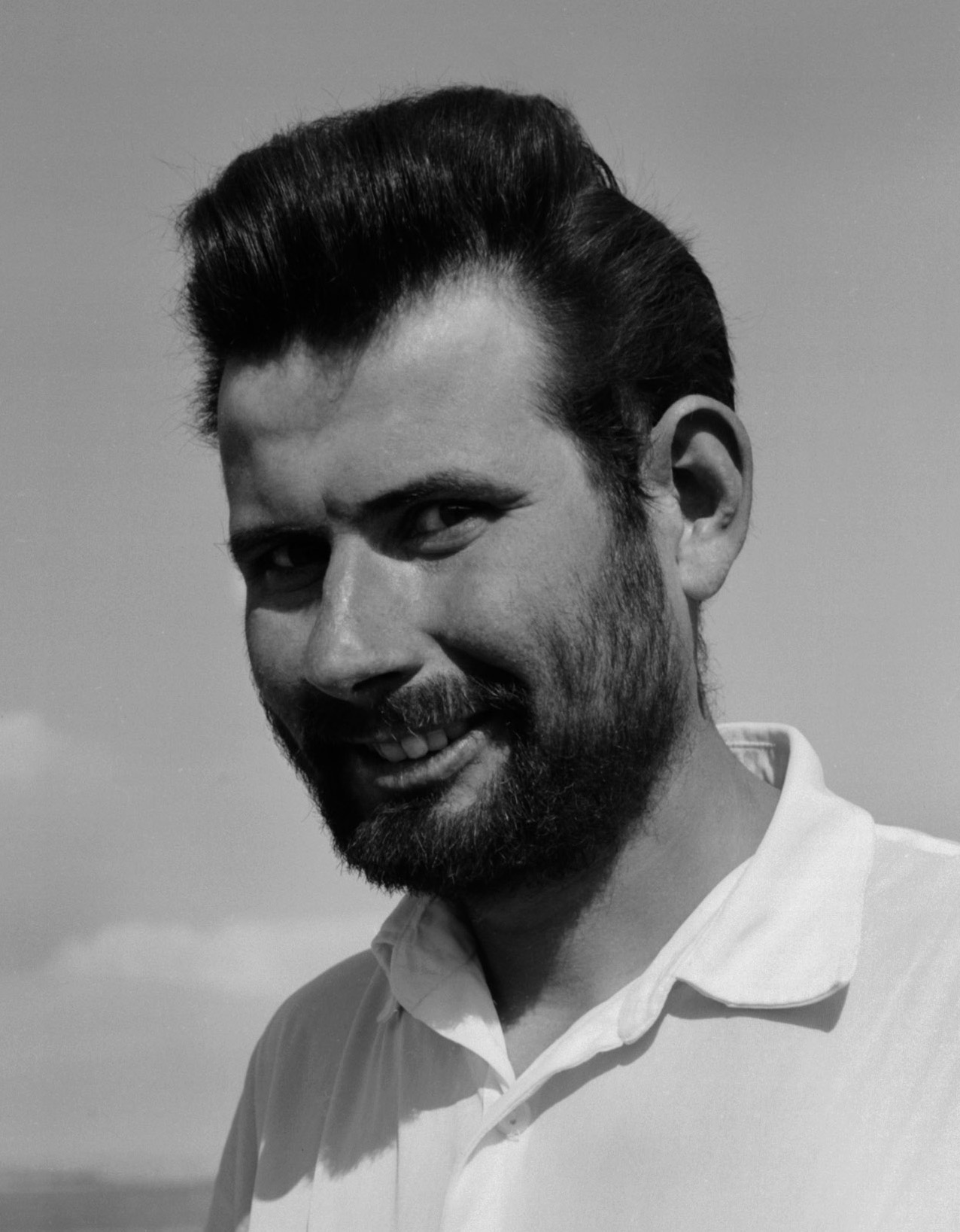
- Born: July 25, 1936; Prague, Czechoslovakia
- Died: February 13, 2021 (aged 84); Montreal, Quebec, Canada
- Citizenship: Canadian and Czech Republic
- Education: Saint Petersburg University, Joint Institute for Nuclear Research, Dubna, Russia
- Known for: Symmetries in physics, super-integrable systems, symmetries of continuous and discrete systems
- Awards: CAP-CRM Prize in Theoretical and Mathematical Physics. Wigner medal
- Scientific career
- Fields: Mathematical Physics
- Workplaces: Université de Montreal
- Thesis: Lorentz group and relativistic symmetries in elementary particle theory (1966)
- Doctoral advisor: J. A. Smorodinsky
- Doctoral students: Luc Vinet
- Website: www.crm.umontreal.ca/~wintern/

Pavel Winternitz (July 25, 1936 – February 13, 2021) was a Czech-born Canadian mathematical physicist. He completed undergraduate studies at Prague University and received a doctorate from Leningrad University (Ph.D. 1962) under the supervision of J. A. Smorodinsky. His research is on integrable systems and symmetries.

== Life and career ==
Winternitz was a member of the Mathematical Physics group at the Centre de recherches mathématiques (CRM), a national research centre in mathematics at the Université de Montréal and Professor in the Department of Mathematics and Statistics at Université de Montréal.

His work has had a strong impact in several domains of mathematical physics, and his publications are very widely cited.

In 2001, he was recipient of the CAP-CRM Prize in Theoretical and Mathematical Physics .

In 2018, he was recipient of the Wigner medal.

Winternitz died in Montreal on February 13, 2021, at the age of 84.
