= UNESCO Chairs =

Programme to build university networks across borders

The UNESCO Chairs program was conceived by the United Nations Educational, Scientific and Cultural Organization (UNESCO) as a way to advance research, training and programme development in higher education by building university networks and encouraging inter-university cooperation through transfer of knowledge across borders.

== History ==
The program was established in 1992 following the decision taken at the 26th session of the General Conference of UNESCO.

As of 19 May 2026, the programme involves some 1100 institutions in 130 countries.

== Notable people ==
Name	Nationality	UNESCO Chair	Institution	Years
Amitav Acharya	Indian-born Canadian	UNESCO Chair in Transnational Challenges and Governance	American University	
Saied Reza Ameli	Iranian	UNESCO Chair on Cyberspace and Culture	University of Tehran	
Patrizio Bianchi	Italian	UNESCO Chair in Education, Growth and Equality.	University of Ferrara	2020–present
Graciela Chichilnisky	Argentine-American	UNESCO Professor of Mathematics and Economics	Columbia University	1995–2008
Levon Chookaszian	Armenian	UNESCO Chair of Armenian Art History	Yerevan State University	
George P. Chrousos	Greek	UNESCO Chair on Adolescent Health Care	University of Athens	
Robin Coningham	British	UNESCO Chair in Archaeological Ethics and Practice in Cultural Heritage	Durham University	2014–present
Ali Akbar Moosavi-Movahedi	Iranian	UNESCO Chair on Interdisciplinary Research in Diabetes	University of Tehran	2014–present
Norman Davies	British-Polish		Jagiellonian University	–2012
Wolfgang Dietrich	Austrian	UNESCO Chair for Peace Studies	University of Innsbruck	2008–present
Miguel Angel Escotet		UNESCO Chair on History and Future of The university		Emeritus
Nezameddin Faghih	Iranian	UNESCO Chair in Entrepreneurship	University of Tehran	
Luciano Floridi	Italian	UNESCO Chair in Information and Computer Ethics	University of Hertfordshire	2008–2013
Alexander Hinton		UNESCO Chair in Genocide Prevention	Rutgers University	2013–present
Richard Hotte	Canadian	UNESCO Chair in Global Smart Disruptive Learning	Université TÉLUQ	2018–present
İoanna Kuçuradi	Turkish	UNESCO Chair of Philosophy	Maltepe University	1998–present
Steffen Lehmann	German	UNESCO Chair in Sustainable Urban Development for Asia and the Pacific	University of Newcastle	2008–2010
Jean Paul Lehners	Luxembourgish	UNESCO Chair in Human Rights	University of Luxembourg	2011–present
Colin J. McInnes	British	UNESCO Chair in HIV/AIDS Education and Health Security in Africa	Aberystwyth University	2007–present
Fethi Mansouri	Tunisian-Australian	UNESCO Chair in Comparative Research on Cultural Diversity and Social Justice	Deakin University	2013–present
Alberto Melloni	Italian	UNESCO Chair for Religious Pluralism and Peace	University of Modena and Reggio Emilia	
Aída Mencía Ripley	Dominican	UNESCO Chair on Social and Academic Inclusion for People with Disabilities and Special Education Needs	Universidad Iberoamericana (UNIBE)	
Robert J. Naiman	American	UNESCO Chair in Sustainable Rivers	University of Washington	
Gerard Niyungeko	Burundian	UNESCO Chair in Education for Peace and Conflicts Resolution	University of Burundi	
Damilola Sunday Olawuyi	Nigerian	UNESCO Chair on Environmental Law and Sustainable Development	Hamad Bin Khalifa University	2022–present
Amii Omara-Otunnu	Ugandan	UNESCO Chair in Comparative Human Rights	University of Connecticut	2001–2016
Alison Phipps	British	UNESCO Chair in Refugee Integration through Languages and Arts	University of Glasgow	2016–present
Florin Popențiu Vlădicescu	Romanian	UNESCO Chair in Information and Communication Engineering	City, University of London	1998–present
Vojin Rakić	Serbian	UNESCO Chair in Bioethics	University of Belgrade	2015–present
Umar Saif	Pakistani	UNESCO Chair in Information and communication Technology for Development	Information Technology University	2018–present
Kartikeya Sarabhai	Indian	UNESCO Chair on Education for Sustainable Development and the Human Habitat	Centre for Environment Education	
Ann Skelton	South African	UNESCO Chair in Education Law in Africa	University of Pretoria	2013–present
Ponnumony Vethamony	Indian	UNESCO Chair in marine sciences	Qatar University's ESC	2020–present
Christine Volkmann	German	UNESCO Chair for Entrepreneurship and Intercultural Management	University of Wuppertal	2005–present
Daniel A. Wagner	American	UNESCO Chair in Learning and Literacy	University of Pennsylvania	2012–present
Sylvia Walby	British	UNESCO Chair in Gender Research	Lancaster University	2008–present
Donna Yates		UNESCO Chair in Cultural Heritage and Emerging Crime	Maastricht University	2026–present
Syed Javaid Zaidi	Canadian	UNESCO Chair in desalination and water treatment	Qatar University's CAM	2022–present
