= CAP-CRM Prize in Theoretical and Mathematical Physics =

The CAP-CRM Prize in Theoretical and Mathematical Physics is an annual prize awarded by the Canadian Association of Physicists (CAP) and Centre de Recherches Mathématiques (CRM) to recognize research excellence in the fields of theoretical and mathematical physics. The award winner's research should have been performed in Canada or in affiliation with a Canadian organization.

== Previous winners ==
A list of previous winners can be found at the CAP website.

- 1995 Werner Israel (University of Alberta)
- 1996 William Unruh (University of British Columbia)
- 1997 Ian Affleck (University of British Columbia)
- 1998 J. Richard Bond (Canadian Institute for Theoretical Astrophysics)
- 1999 David J. Rowe (University of Toronto)
- 2000 Gordon W. Semenoff (University of British Columbia)
- 2001 André-Marie Tremblay (University of Sherbrooke)
- 2002 Pavel Winternitz (Centre de Recherches Mathématiques/Université de Montréal)
- 2003 Matthew W. Choptuik (University of British Columbia)
- 2004 Jiri Patera (Université de Montréal)
- 2005 Robert C. Myers (Perimeter Institute for Theoretical Physics)
- 2006 John Harnad (Concordia University)
- 2007 Joel Feldman (University of British Columbia)
- 2008 Richard Cleve (University of Waterloo)
- 2009 Hong Guo (McGill University)
- 2010 Clifford Burgess (McMaster University)
- 2011 Robert Brandenberger (McGill University)
- 2012 Luc Vinet (University of Montreal)
- 2013 not awarded
- 2014 Mark Van Raamsdonk (University of British Columbia)
- 2015 Charles Gale (McGill University)
- 2016 Freddy Cachazo (Perimeter Institute for Theoretical Physics)
- 2017 Raymond Laflamme (University of Waterloo)
- 2018 Ariel Zhitnitsky (University of British Columbia)
- 2019 Jaume Gomis (Perimeter Institute for Theoretical Physics)
- 2020 not awarded
- 2021 Robert Raussendorf (University of British Columbia)
- 2022 David London (University of Montreal)
- 2023 Yanqin Wu (University of Toronto)
- 2024 Bianca Dittrich (Perimeter Institute for Theoretical Physics)

== See also ==
- Stefanos Pnevmatikos International Award
- List of physics awards
