= Lynn Loriaux =

American endocrinologist

Donald Lynn Loriaux was a Professor and Chief of Endocrinology and Diabetes at Oregon Health & Science University. He is the inventor of the Lx Stethoscope, which increased variable frequency sound transfer, and has won various awards.

== Early life and education ==
Loriaux was born in Bartlesville, Oklahoma, in 1940 and raised in Santa Fe, New Mexico. He spent two years in the CSU Veterinary School after attending college at Colorado State University. He continued on to Baylor College of Medicine as one of the first students in the Baylor MD/PhD program. He continued medical training at the Peter Bent Brigham Hospital (formerly Brigham and Women's Hospital) and Harvard Medical School. At the National Institutes of Health in Bethesda, Maryland he completed his endocrine training. He became Chief of the Developmental Endocrinology branch, and Clinical Director of NICHD throughout his 20 years in Bethesda. He moved to Portland in 1990. At Oregon Health & Science University, Lynn was head of the endocrinology division, then moved on to Chairman of the Department of Internal Medicine for 19 years. Loriaux was also president of the Endocrine Society in 1995.

== Career ==
In 2019, Loriaux became Chief of the Division of Endocrinology, Diabetes, and Metabolism at Oregon Health & Science University (OHSU). He is the chair of the Federated Societies of Diabetes, Endocrinology and Metabolism, the Endocrinology Study Section (NIH) and the National Cooperative Centers for Infertility Research (NIH). Loriaux is a Master in the American College of Physicians, Editor-in-Chief of The Endocrinologist, the quarterly magazine of the Society for Endocrinology. He is also Associate Editor of ACP Medicine. As chairman of Medicine, he has served longer than any other in the nation.

== Lx Stethoscope ==
Loriaux is the inventor of the Lx Stethoscope. The wooden bell is custom made and handcrafted in Oregon. He advanced the diaphragm and bell combination to achieve an unparalleled variable frequency sound transfer after many years of studying the Bowles and Cammann bell scopes from the late 1800s and early 1900s, and the Rappaport & Sprague scopes from the 1940s.

== Awards ==
Loriaux has received a number of awards, including:

- ACP National Award
- Distinguished Alumni - Medical School
- Elected Member of The American Society for Clinical Investigation, 1978
- Award for Outstanding Work In Science As Related To Medicine

== Books and publications ==
- Endocrine Emergencies ISBN 9781627036979 New York:Human Press 2014
- A Biographical History of Endocrinology ISBN 978-1119202462 Wiley-Blackwell 2014. A collection of 108 Biographical sketches, 100 of which first appeared in The Endocrinologist during the period 1991 to 2000.
- Supplement to the Endocrinologist: "In Honor of Fuller Albright: Father of Modern Endocrinology" Lippincot, Williams, & Wilkins 2000
- Mechanisms of Physical and Emotional Stress (Advances in Experimental Medicine and Biology) by D Lynn Loriaux; Philip W Gold;and George P. Chrousos ISBN 0306430177 Springer 1988 / Plenum Press 1988
- "Steroid Hormone Resistance: Mechanisms and Clinical Aspects" (Advances in Experimental Medicine and Biology) ISBN 0306422298 Springer 1986
- The Endocrinologist

Over 502 Publications
