= Hotte =

Hotte is a surname. Notable people with the surname include:

- Mark Hotte (born 1978), English footballer
- Paul Hotte, Canadian production designer and art director
- Richard Hotte (born 1948), Canadian academic and professor of information technology
- Tim Hotte (born 1963), English footballer
