= Luc Vinet =

Canadian physicist (born 1953)

Luc Vinet CM OQ

10th Rector of the Université de Montréal
- In office 1 June 2005 – 31 May 2010
- Preceded by: Robert Lacroix
- Succeeded by: Guy Breton

Personal details
- Born: April 16, 1953 (age 73) Montreal, Quebec, Canada
- Scientific career
- Education: PhD, Université Pierre-et-Marie-Curie and Université de Montréal
- Awards: Prix du Québec Armand-Frappier (2009), CAP-CRM Prize in Theoretical and Mathematical Physics (2012), Officer of the National Order of Quebec (2017), Fellows of the American Mathematical Society (2017), Fellow of the Royal Society of Canada (2018), Fellow of the Canadian Mathematical Society (2019), Member, Order of Canada, The Governor General of Canada (2021), Prix Urgel Archambault, Acfas (2022).
- Fields: Physics, mathematics
- Workplaces: Université de Montréal and McGill University
- Thesis: La cinématique quantique non-relativiste des systèmes à une ou plusieurs particules (1976)
- Doctoral advisors: Pavel Winternitz; John Harnad
- Website: https://vinetlab.com/

Luc Vinet CM OQ (born April 16, 1953) is a Canadian physicist and mathematician. He was former rector of the Université de Montréal between 2005 and 2010. He is the CEO of IVADO, created in 2015 since August 2021.

== Biography ==
Born in Montreal, Quebec, Vinet holds a doctorate (3rd cycle) from the Université Pierre et Marie Curie and a PhD from the Université de Montréal, both in theoretical physics. After two years as Research Associate at MIT, he was appointed in the early 1980s as faculty member in the Physics Department at the Université de Montréal. He has held a number of visiting professorships at various universities. He is the author or co-author of ten books and more than three hundred scientific papers. His research areas include gauge field theories, supersymmetry, quantum algebra, integrable systems and combinatorics.

At the Université de Montréal, Vinet held the position of director of the Centre de recherches mathématiques (CRM) from 1993 to 1999. During his term as director, the CRM succeeded in rallying the forces of quantitative research by forming a network of centers of excellence in computing from the association of seven major Montreal research centers (CERCA, CIRANO, CRIM, CRM, CRI, GERAD and INRS–Télécom) under the banner of the Network for Computing and Mathematical Modeling (NCM2). The research network provides "one-stop" access to expertise calculation and modeling for more than 20 partner enterprises.

As president of NCM2 from 1996 to 1999, he was at the origin of two important research initiatives: the Bell University Laboratory, of which he became the first president and chief executive officer, and the Réseau québécois de calcul de haute performance (RQCHP), a high performance computing organization for which he presented the first grant application to the Canadian Foundation for Innovation (CFI). Vinet is also one of the founding members of and the MITACS Network of Centers of Excellence, which received an initial funding of 14 million dollars.

In 1999, Vinet joined the ranks of McGill University where he held the positions of Vice-Principal (academic) and Provost. As McGill's Chief Academic Officer, he developed a renewal scheme of the professoriate and supervised the development of numerous campus infrastructures. It was at his initiative that the Government of Quebec and Quebec universities set up the Génome Québec organization.

In June 2005, Vinet was appointed rector of the Université de Montréal. As rector, he set an inspired vision for this great institution, developing and executing an integrated strategic plan for the university. Among the many initiatives he realized are the development of a new campus and science pavilion project at the Outremont rail yards acquired in 2006, the creation of the School of Public Health, the establishment of the Cité du Savoir in Laval and the founding of the International Forum of Public Universities.

In 2013, he became director of the Centre de recherches mathématiques (CRM) until 2021. Then, Vinet succeed Gilles Savard, in August 2021, as the CEO of IVADO, created in 2015.

Vinet sits on or has sat on the boards of organizations including the Institut de finance mathématique de Montréal, the Canadian Institute for Telecommunications Research, and the Ouranos Consortium. He is the board chair for Fulbright. He has also participated in the research of a number of committees within organizations, among them Montréal International, the Chambre de commerce de Montréal, the Conférence des recteurs et des principaux des universités du Québec and the Association of American Universities. Honorary member of the Golden Key National Honor Society, he is also member of the Canadian Applied and Industrial Mathematics Society, the Canadian Association of Physicists, the Canadian Mathematical Society, the American Physical Society, the American Mathematical Society, the Association mathématique du Québec and the Society for Industrial and Applied Mathematics.

== Visiting positions ==
- Invited Professor at Université catholique de Louvain (1980–1982)
- Invited researcher at Massachusetts Institute of Technology (1987)
- Invited Professor at University of California, Los Angeles (UCLA) (1989–1990)
- Invited Professor at Shanghai Jiao Tong University (2013)
- Chair Visiting Professor at Shanghai Jiao Tong University (2014-2017)
- CNRS Invited Researcher at Université François Rabelais de Tours (2017)
- CNRS Invited Researcher at Savoy Mont Blanc University (2018)
- Invited Researcher at Savoy Mont Blanc University (2021)
- CNRS Invited Researcher at University of Tours (2021)
- Affiliate member Perimeter Institute (2021-)

== Distinctions ==
- Honorary Member of the Golden Key International Honour Society(2002)
- Ph.D. Honoris Causa from Université Claude-Bernard in Lyon (2006)
- Officer of the Ordre des Palmes Académiques de France (2009)
- Prix du Québec Armand-Frappier (2009)
- CAP-CRM Prize in Theoretical and Mathematical Physics(2012)
- Officer of the National Order of Quebec (2017).
- Fellows of the American Mathematical Society(2017)
- Fellow of the Royal Society of Canada(2018)
- Fellow of the Canadian Mathematical Society(2019)
- Member, Order of Canada, The Governor General of Canada (2021)
- Prix Urgel Archambault, Acfas(2022)

== See also ==
- List of Université de Montréal people

Academic offices
Preceded by Robert Lacroix	10th Recteur de l'Université de Montréal; 2005 – 2010	Succeeded by Guy Breton
