= Donna Yates =

Donna Yates may refer to:

- Donna Yates (EastEnders), fictional character
- Donna Yates (professor), archaeologist
