= 1954 Lake of Two Mountains boating accident =

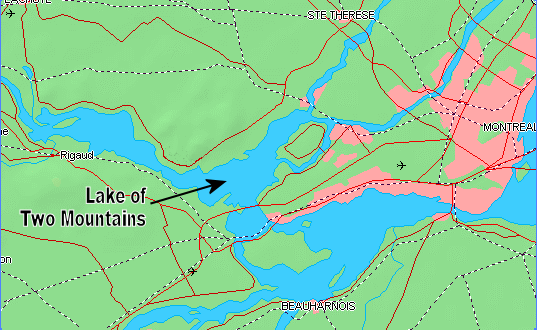
Location of the Lake of Two Mountains.

The 1954 Lake of Two Mountains boating accident occurred July 13, 1954 on the Lake of Two Mountains off of Montreal's West Island. A motorboat carrying 17 children capsized and 12 children died. The children, part of the Negro Community Centre of Montreal, were between the ages of 6 and 11 and most did not know how to swim. It is one of the worst boating accidents in Canadian history and is commemorated each year by community members. A memorial for the deceased children was announced in 2024. Denzil Alleyne, Margo and Marilyn Fonseca, Brenda Kelly, Carol Leek, Alan Leek, Paula Millington, Leon Nealey, Edwin and Diane Springer, Doreen Walton, and Estelle Walton were the 12 drowning victims. The deceased children have been referred to in the press and by community members as "the Twelve" since the accident.
