= Iran Bioinformatics Center =

Academic center in Iran

Iran Bioinformatics Center (IBC) is the only academic center in Iran working on Bioinformatics. Although there are some independent research groups such as Bioinformatics and Biomathematics Unit in Mazandaran University of Medical Sciences working on Bioinformatics, IBC is a part of Institute of Biochemistry and Biophysics (IBB) in Tehran University. IBC offers a Ph.D. program for Bioinformatics.

== See also ==
- Institute of Biochemistry and Biophysics
- Tehran University
- Bioinformatics and Biomathematics Unit
- Bioinformatics
