= Matthew Choptuik =

Canadian theoretical physicist

Matthew W. Choptuik
- Born: 1961 (age 64–65)
- Education: University of British Columbia
- Scientific career
- Fields: Theoretical physics
- Thesis: A Study of Numerical Techniques for Radiative Problems in General Relativity (1986)
- Doctoral advisor: W. G. Unruh
- Doctoral students: Frans Pretorius

Matthew William Choptuik (born 1961) is a Canadian theoretical physicist specializing in numerical relativity.

Choptuik graduated from University of British Columbia with a master's degree in 1982 and a Ph.D. advised by William Unruh in 1986. He became an associate professor in 1995 at the University of Texas at Austin. In 1999 he became a member of the Institute for Theoretical Physics at the University of California, Santa Barbara and in the same year he became a professor at University of British Columbia.

In 1993, he discovered critical phenomena in gravitational collapse via numerical studies. He showed—under non-generic initial conditions —the possibility of the occurrence of naked singularity in general relativity with scalar matter. This had previously been the subject of a bet between Stephen Hawking, Kip Thorne and John Preskill. Hawking lost the bet after Choptuik's publication, but renewed it under non-generic initial conditions.

Choptuik was the 2001 awardee of the Rutherford Memorial Medal. In 2003 he received the CAP-CRM Prize in Theoretical and Mathematical Physics. In 2003 he became a fellow of the American Physical Society. In 2002, he became an honorary doctor of Brandon University.
