= Ariel Zhitnitsky =

Canadian theoretical physicist

Ariel R. Zhitnitsky is a theoretical physicist and professor at the University of British Columbia in Vancouver, Canada. His research includes theoretical particle physics, quantum chromodynamics (QCD), and cosmology. In particular, he works on axion physics, vacuum energy in gauge theories, and the application of non-perturbative QCD to understanding the nature of dark matter and dark energy.

In 2018, Zhitnitsky received the CAP–CRM Prize in Theoretical and Mathematical Physics for his "ground-breaking contributions to theoretical high-energy physics".

== Education and career ==
Zhitnitsky completed his PhD at Novosibirsk State University in 1980. He was first appointed at the Institute of Nuclear Physics in Novosibirsk, Russia, and he held visiting positions at CERN (1991), the Institute for Advanced Study (Princeton, 1992) and SLAC (Stanford, 1995). Since 1995, Zhitnitsky has been a faculty member in the Department of Physics and Astronomy at the University of British Columbia.

== Research ==
Zhitnitsky is known for developing an invisible axion model. An equivalent model was independently developed by Dine, Fischler, and Srednicki in 1981; together, these are known as the DFSZ QCD axion model. It remains one of the principal theoretical frameworks for experimental axion searches. Axions are considered promising dark-matter candidate. Over the past several decades, experimental searches for dark-matter axions have increasingly targeted the DFSZ model, notably through the ADMX experiment.

From 1977 to the mid-1980s, Zhitnitsky collaborated extensively with Victor Chernyak on the application of perturbative QCD to exclusive processes at high energies, particularly the structure of hadrons in terms of their quark and gluon constituents. Their work introduced hadronic light-cone distribution amplitudes, including the Chernyak–Zhitnitsky (CZ) pion distribution amplitude. It is used in theoretical descriptions of hadronic form factors and exclusive scattering processes.

Between 2000 and 2010, Zhitnitsky investigated the behaviour of strongly interacting matter at high baryon density, including colour superconductivity, the structure of neutron stars, and quantum anomalies. In collaboration with D. T. Son, he studied anomalous currents in dense QCD matter and their relationship to effective field theories and topological effects. In 2007, with D. Kharzeev, he investigated possible electric-charge separation arising from local parity-odd and CP-odd configurations of QCD matter in relativistic heavy-ion collisions. Their work was an early theoretical contribution to studies of anomalous transport phenomena and the chiral magnetic effect (CME).

Since 2026, Zhitnitsky has investigated an alternative to conventional phenomenological descriptions of dark energy based on a physical explanation: non-perturbative properties of the QCD topological vacuum could contribute to the accelerated expansion of the Universe. In 2026, in collaboration with L. Van Waerbeke, he developed QCD-DE, a model in which such topological contributions give rise to a time-dependent dark-energy component that has been tested against cosmological observations.

== Awards and honours ==
2001: UBC Killam Prize in Science

2002: Killam Faculty Research Fellowship

2018: CAP–CRM Prize in Theoretical and Mathematical Physics
