= Daniel Jutras =

Canadian legal scholar and academic administrator (born 1960)

Daniel Jutras OC

12th Rector of the Université de Montréal
- Incumbent
- Assumed office 1 June 2020
- Chancellor: Frantz Saintellemy
- Preceded by: Guy Breton

Personal details
- Born: 1960 (age 65–66)
- Education: Université de Montréal (LLB); Harvard University (LLM)

Daniel Jutras OC (born 1960) is a Canadian lawyer and academic specializing in civil and comparative law and current rector of the Université de Montréal in Quebec, Canada.

== Career ==
Jutras became a member of the Barreau du Quebec in 1984. From 1985 to 2020, he taught law at McGill University. During his time at McGill, he became director of the Institute of Comparative Law from 1998 to 2002, served as dean of the McGill Faculty of Law from 2009 to 2016, and held the Wainwright Chair in Civil Law from 2010 to 2020.

Jutras served as executive legal officer for the Chief Justice at the Supreme Court of Canada, the Right Honourable Beverley McLachlin, from 2002 to 2004.

Following a ten-month consultation process, Jutras was selected as successor to Guy Breton as rector of the Université de Montréal. He began his five-year mandate on 1 June 2020.

== Honours ==
Jutras was named an Officer of the Order of Canada in recognition of his contributions to university life, Canadian political life and innovation in teaching.

He was awarded a Queen Elizabeth II Diamond Jubilee Medal in 2013.

In 2014, he was awarded the Advocatus emeritus distinction from the Barreau du Québec.

== Coalition Avenir Québec's Tuition Hike ==
When the CAQ introduced a tuition hike for out-of-province students in 2023, Jutras was one of five leaders of French post-secondary institutions who penned an open letter criticizing the tuition plan. The letter outlined that while the tuition hike aimed to protect the French language in post-secondary institutions by targeting english dominant schools like McGill and Concordia, it would do little for French-speaking institutions like the Université de Montréal.

== Personal life ==
Jutras is married to Manon Savard, Chief Justice of Quebec.

Academic offices
Preceded by Guy Breton	12th Rector of the Université de Montréal; 2020–present	Incumbent
