= Dominique Gaspard =

American physician

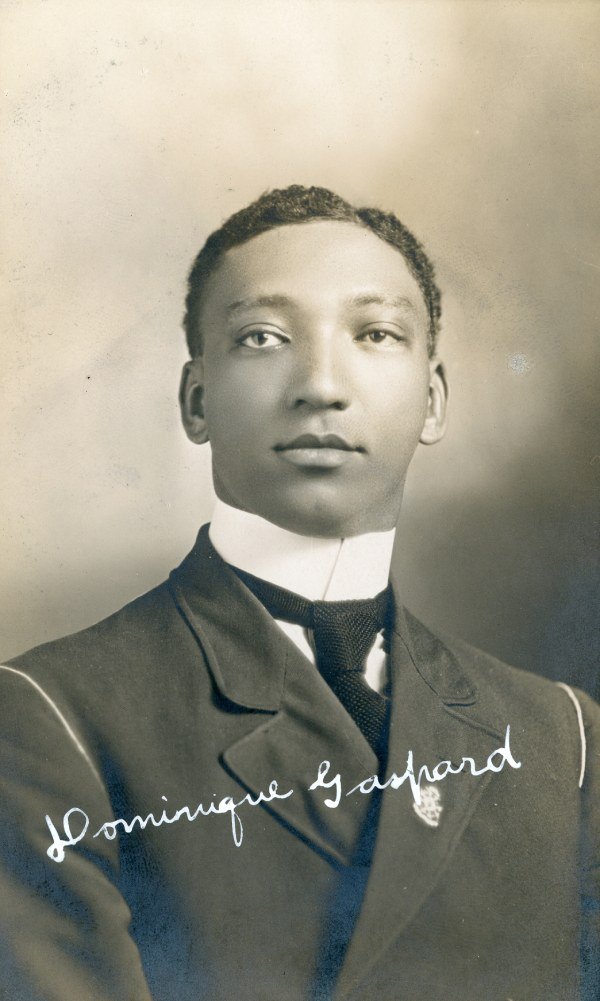
- Born: December 22, 1884; New Orleans, Louisiana, U.S.
- Died: February 6, 1938 (aged 53); Montreal, Quebec, Canada
- Education: Saint Hyacinthe Seminary, Université de Montréal
- Occupation: Doctor of Medicine
- Spouse: Ethyl May Lyons
- Parent(s): John and Esther Gaspard

Dominique Gaspard (22 December 1884 - 6 February 1938) was an American-born creole physician who moved to Quebec in his youth and stayed until his death, having contributed greatly to the medical and Black community.

== Personal life ==
Dominique and his twin brother, Barthelmi, were born in New Orleans on December 22, 1884. He married Ethel May Lyons in 1921. He died in Hôpital de Verdun in 1938, and was buried in Notre Dame des Neiges Cemetery.

== Education ==
In 1904, Gaspard was encouraged to enter the Saint-Hyacinthe Seminary near Montreal, Quebec. The seminary had begun accepting Black students in the 1860s, and Gaspard applied with a letter of recommendation from Charles Uncles, a previous graduate.

Gaspard entered the seminary in 1905 and quickly impressed the fathers and priests. In 1910, Gaspard wrote an essay discussing the lives and histories of previous Black students entitled "Le Séminaire et ses élèves noirs". This essay is one of the earliest accounts discussing the treatment and education of Black men in Catholic schools in Quebec.

Upon completion of his studies at the seminary in 1911, Gaspard wished to enter into the order of Dominican priests but was turned down due to his skin colour. He instead applied to the Montreal branch of Université Laval (which later became Université de Montréal) to study medicine. He started the program in 1912.

== War service ==
Gaspard's studies were interrupted by the outbreak of First World War when Gaspard worked as a medical volunteer with the Canadian Expeditionary Force at a field hospital in France near Paris. He received La Médaille des épidémies du ministère de la Guerre (“epidemic medal”) from the French minister of war. He returned to Montreal in 1917 and completed his medical degree a year later. He set up a practice in Old Montreal and was a founding member of the NCC.

== Legacy ==
Gaspard graduated in 1918 and spent the remainder of his life in Montréal. Aside from his medical profession, Gaspard played an active role in the community by supporting and establishing important organizations within his community. He joined, for example, the Universal Negro Improvement Association in 1920 and founded the Negro Community Centre of Montreal with his wife in 1927. He also founded the Coloured War Veterans’ Legion in 1935, the only legion exclusively for black Canadian veterans. This legion was later renamed to the Dr. Gaspard Royal Canadian Legion Branch No. 50 in his honour.

In 1927, Gaspard, along with his wife, became a founding member of the Negro Community Centre of Montreal.

In 1935, Gaspard was one of 15 men who made the initial application to establish the Coloured Veterans’ Legion in the St. Antoine district. The Coloured War Veterans Branch (Quebec no. 50) received its charter from Dominion Command in Ottawa on March 20, 1935 and opened its doors at 1450 St. Antoine.

On April 13, 1953, the name of (Quebec no. 50) was changed from the Coloured War Veterans’ Branch to Dr. Gaspard Royal Canadian Legion Branch no. 50.
