= John Harnad =

Hungarian mathematical-physicist

- Born: 1946 (age 79–80); Budapest, Hungary
- Citizenship: Canadian
- Education: McGill University, University of Oxford
- Known for: Dimensional reduction, spectral Darboux coordinates, soliton correlation matrix, Harnad duality, convolution flows, weighted Hurwitz numbers
- Awards: CAP-CRM Prize in Theoretical and Mathematical Physics
- Scientific career
- Fields: Mathematical Physics
- Workplaces: Concordia University, Centre de recherches mathématiques
- Thesis: Topics in hadronic scattering (1972)
- Doctoral advisor: John Clayton Taylor
- Doctoral students: Luc Vinet
- Website: www.crm.umontreal.ca/~harnad/

John Harnad (born Hernád János in 1946) is a Hungarian-born Canadian mathematical physicist. He did his undergraduate studies at McGill University and his doctorate at the University of Oxford (D.Phil. 1972) under the supervision of John C. Taylor. His research is on integrable systems, gauge theory and random matrices.

He is currently Director of the Mathematical Physics group at the Centre de recherches mathématiques (CRM), a national research centre in mathematics at the Université de Montréal and Professor in the Department of Mathematics and Statistics at Concordia University. He is an affiliate member of the Perimeter Institute for Theoretical Physics and was a long-time visiting member of the Princeton Institute for Advanced Study .

His work has had a strong impact in several domains of mathematical physics, and his publications are very widely cited. He has made fundamental contributions on: geometrical and topological methods in gauge theory, classical and quantum integrable systems, the spectral theory of random matrices, isomonodromic deformations, the bispectral problem, integrable random processes, transformation groups and symmetries.

In 2006, he was recipient of the CAP-CRM Prize in Theoretical and Mathematical Physics "For his deep and lasting contributions to the theory of integrable systems with connections to gauge theory, inverse scattering and random matrices".
