= Frans Pretorius =

South African and Canadian physicist (b. 1973)

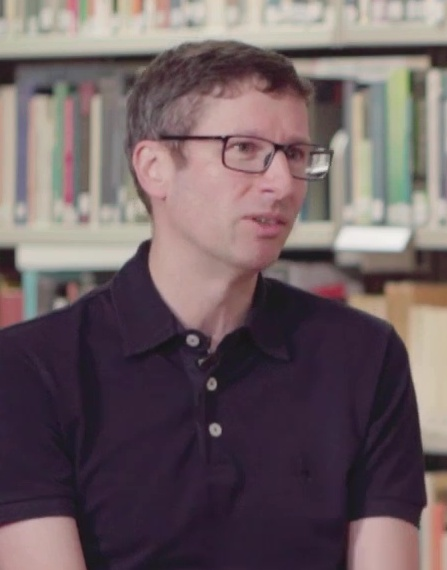
- Born: 31 July 1973 (age 53); Johannesburg, South Africa
- Education: University of Victoria; University of British Columbia
- Awards: Sloan Fellowship (2010) Aneesur Rahman Prize for Computational Physics (2010); New Horizons in Physics Prize (2017); Dirac Medal of the ICTP (2021) Galileo Galilei Medal (2021)
- Scientific career
- Fields: Computational physics
- Workplaces: California Institute of Technology; University of Alberta; Princeton University
- Thesis: Numerical Simulations of Gravitational Collapse (2002)
- Doctoral advisor: Matthew Choptuik

Frans Pretorius (born 31 July 1973) is a South African and Canadian physicist, specializing in computer simulations in astrophysics and numerical solutions of Einstein's field equations. He is professor of physics at Princeton University and director of the Princeton Gravity Initiative.

== Biography ==
Pretorius sat for a B.Sc. in computer engineering in 1996 and an M.Sc. in physics in 1999 for his thesis, entitled Topics in Black Hole Physics under Werner Israel, at the University of Victoria. He defended his Ph.D. in 2002 under Matthew Choptuik at the University of British Columbia. For his doctoral dissertation on numerical simulation of gravitational collapse, Pretorius received the 2003 Nicholas Metropolis Award of the American Physical Society. From 2002 to 2005 he was a Richard Chace Tolman Fellow at the California Institute of Technology. He then became an assistant professor in 2005 at the University of Alberta and in 2007 at Princeton University.

== Research ==
His research deals with numerical simulations in general relativity theory, especially gravitational collapse, collision, and mergers of black holes and consequent emission of gravitational waves. He has developed new methods of adaptive meshes, which are used in adaptive mesh refinement for coupled elliptic-hyperbolic systems.

Pretorius has numerically investigated the possibilities and the signatures of small black holes in particle colliders such as the LHC. Small black holes might be formed with very high collision energies, the energy required might be a factor 2.3 smaller than previously assumed, but such high energies are extremely far from the capabilities of the LHC. With Abhay Ashtekar and Fethi Ramazanoğlu, he investigated the evaporation of 2D black holes. Pretorius and his collaborators numerically investigated the high energy collision of two black holes.

== Awards and honors ==
Pretorius was a Sloan Fellow in 2010 and received in 2010 the Aneesur Rahman Prize for Computational Physics. In 2011 he was elected a Fellow of the American Physical Society. In 2017 he was awarded the New Horizons in Physics Prize for the development of the first computer code that can simulate the spiral movement and the fusion of two black holes; in 2017 five other physicists in two different groups shared the prize for work done independently of Pretorius. In 2021 he received the Dirac Medal of the ICTP.

== See also ==
- Numerical relativity#2005's Breakthrough (annus mirabilis of numerical relativity)

== Selected publications ==
- Pretorius, Frans (14 September 2005). "Evolution of Binary Black-Hole Spacetimes". Physical Review Letters. 95 (12) 121101. arXiv:gr-qc/0507014. Bibcode:2005PhRvL..95l1101P. doi:10.1103/physrevlett.95.121101. ISSN 0031-9007. PMID 16197061. S2CID 24225193.
- Colpi, Monica (2009). Physics of relativistic objects in compact binaries: from birth to coalescence. Dordrecht: Springer. ISBN 978-1-4020-9264-0. OCLC 341597764.
