= Institute of Biochemistry and Biophysics =

Iranian research institute

- مرکز تحقیقات بیوشیمی و بیوفیزیک
- Type: Research Institute
- Established: 1976
- President: Prof. Ali Akbar Moosavi-Movahedi
- Location: Tehran, Iran
- Website: Official website

The Institute of Biochemistry and Biophysics (IBB) is an Iranian research institute founded in 1976 to conduct research in cellular and molecular biology. It is affiliated with University of Tehran and is located in the university campus.

IBB is an educational and research oriented center for training postgraduate students both nationally and internationally. Interdisciplinary research is one of the main themes at the institute.

== History ==
At first, IBB was known as the Department of Cellular and Molecular Biology, but later separated to three departments of Biochemistry, Biophysics and Bioinformatics as will be described below. Master's degrees in Biochemistry and Biophysics were established in 1986 and 1990, respectively and PhD degrees in Biochemistry and Biophysics were established in 1989 and 1996, respectively. Initially IBB was divided into two independent educational groups of Biochemistry and Biophysics in 2002. The department of Bioinformatics was established in 2005 just for training Ph.D. students.

== Research and Facilities ==
Currently, IBB is composed of three departments of Biochemistry, Biophysics and Bioinformatics with 21 full-time faculty members of which 10 members are Professors. The department also has 35 administrative staff members. IBB has 17 research laboratories, a general communal use equipments laboratory, a greenhouse, an animal house, a number of computer laboratories, a library and a restaurant.

National and international forum affiliated at IBB:

1. IBB is an affiliated Center of The World Academy of Science(TWAS) in Iran

2. Iranian Secretariat of UNESCO chair on Interdisciplinary Research in Diabetes, (UCIRD) located at IBB

3. Iranian Secretariat of the International Union of Biochemistry and Molecular Biology (IUBMB) located at IBB

4. Iranian Secretariat of the Federation of Asian and Oceanian Biochemists and Molecular Biologists (FAOBMB)

5.Center of Excellence in Biothermodynamics (CEBiotherm) is located at IBB

6. The Secretariat of the Iran Society of Biophysical Chemistry is located at IBB

7. The Secretariat of Iranian BioInformatics Society

8. IBB is affiliated with the Nanotechnology Laboratory Network

== Library ==
The Institute of Biochemistry and Biophysics' (IBB) library was founded in 1976. IBB's library contains 10,000 professional books and 900 thesis in the fields of Biochemistry, Biophysics and Bioinformatics. This library is one of the libraries at the University of Tehran.

== Notable faculty and alumni ==
- Ali Akbar Moosavi-Movahedi
- Mohammad Nabi Sarbolouki

== See also ==
- List of Iranian Research Centers
- The Physical Society of Iran
- Iran Bioinformatics Center
