= Richard Cleve =

Canadian computer scientist

Richard Erwin Cleve
- Education: University of Waterloo; University of Toronto
- Awards: CAP-CRM Prize in Theoretical and Mathematical Physics
- Scientific career
- Fields: Computer science
- Workplaces: University of Calgary; University of Waterloo; Institute for Quantum Computing; Perimeter Institute for Theoretical Physics
- Doctoral advisor: Charles Rackoff

Richard Erwin Cleve is a Canadian professor of computer science at the David R. Cheriton School of Computer Science at the University of Waterloo, where he holds the Institute for Quantum Computing Chair in quantum computing, and an associate member of the Perimeter Institute for Theoretical Physics.

== Education ==
He obtained his BMath and MMath from the University of Waterloo, and his Ph.D. in 1989 at the University of Toronto under the supervision of Charles Rackoff.

== Research ==
He was the recipient of the 2008 CAP-CRM Prize in Theoretical and Mathematical Physics, awarded for "fundamental results in quantum information theory, including the structure of quantum algorithms and the foundations of quantum communication complexity." He has authored several highly cited papers in quantum information, and is one of the creators of the field of quantum communication complexity. He is also one of the founding managing editors of the journal Quantum Information & Computation, a founding fellow of the Quantum Information Processing program at the Canadian Institute for Advanced Research, and a Team Leader at QuantumWorks.
