= Royal Arthur School =

Montreal elementary school (1870–1982)

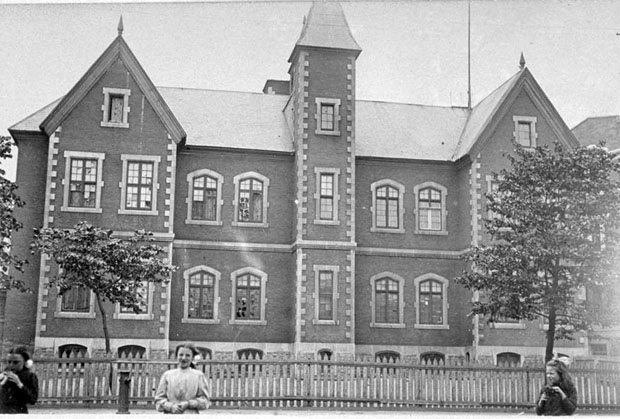
- Original building prior to the 1909 fire

Location
- Montréal, Quebec; Canada

Information
- Type: Elementary
- Established: 1870
- Closed: 1982
- School board: Protestant School Board of Greater Montreal
- Language: English

Royal Arthur School was an elementary school in the Little Burgundy neighbourhood of Montreal. It was an important centre for the Black community and provided the data for an influential study on how individual teachers matter.

== History ==
Construction of the school was approved in 1868, and after operating temporarily in a church basement, the new building was opened by Queen Victoria's son Prince Arthur on 11 February 1870. (Note: The school was initially referred to as the "Royal Western School".) This was the first school built by the new Protestant Board of School Commissioners of Montreal, and it was filled to its capacity of 600 students within 6 months.

The building was remodelled in 1888 and then half-destroyed by fire on 18 January 1909. A new building designed by Alexander Francis Dunlop, was erected on an expanded site and opened in September 1910. Later additions, the first in 1922, further expanded the school's capacity.

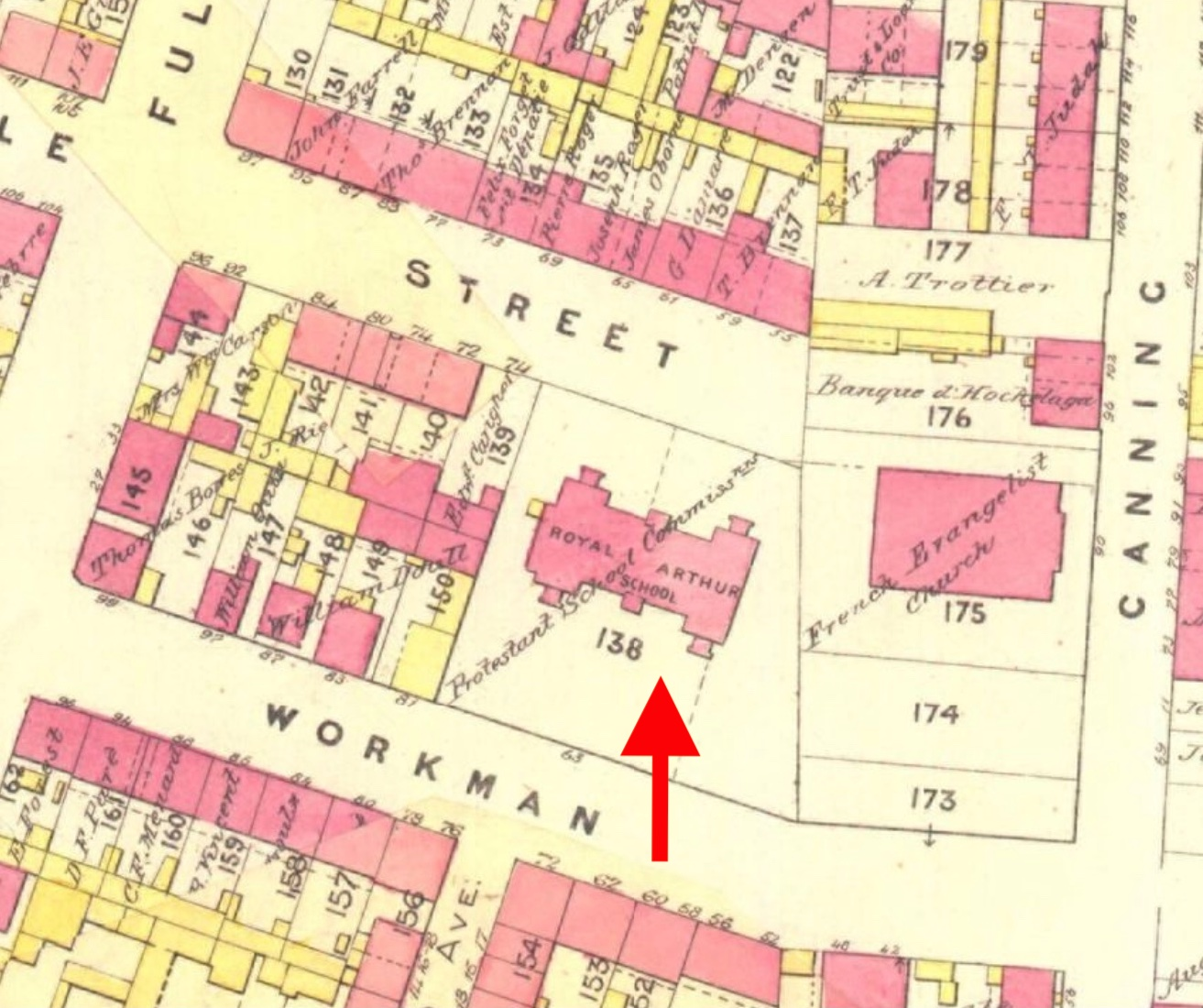
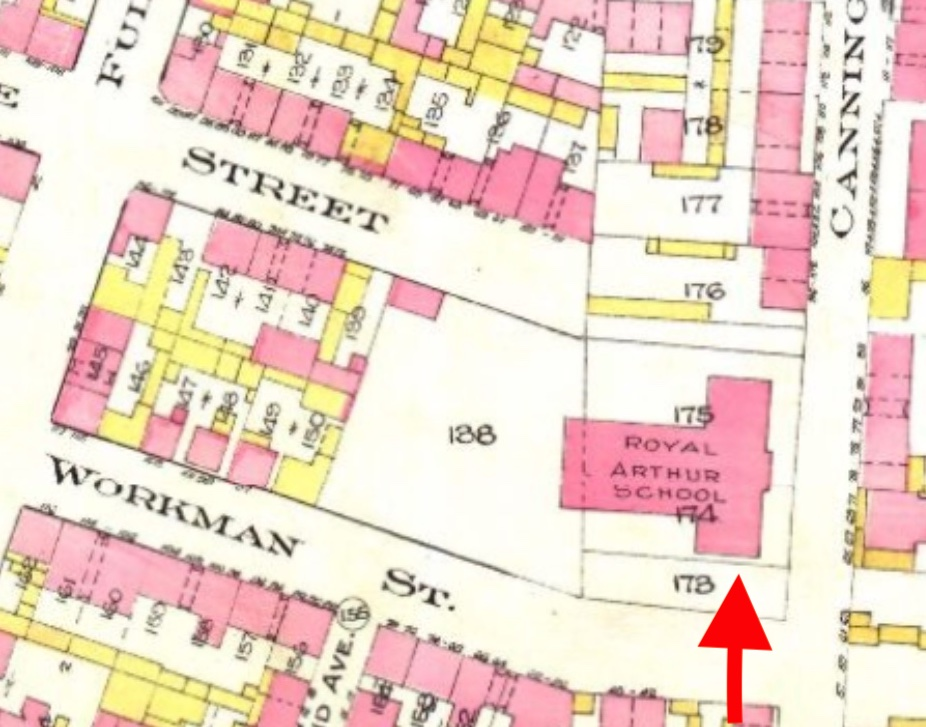
Locations of Royal Arthur School in 1880 and 1912.

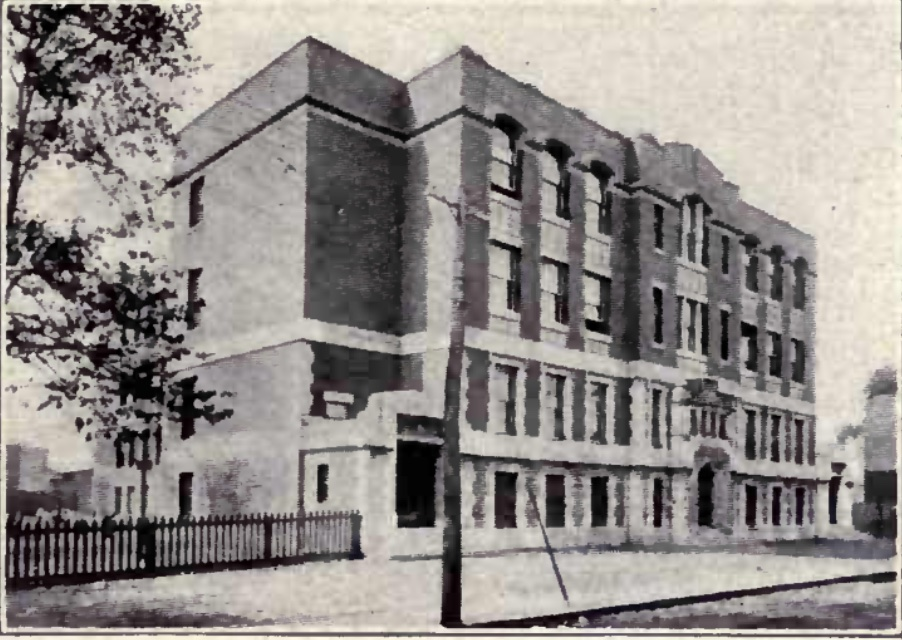
Royal Arthur School in Montreal after being rebuilt in 1910

The school was in one of the poorest areas of the city and had one of the largest indigent enrolments in Canada during the Great Depression. Its mid-twentieth century location was vividly described as

"a fortress in the streets. … freight terminals of a large railway, as well as a steel-fabrication plant, were located in its immediate neighborhood, …. Across the street from the front entrance, the buildings of a brothel, thinly disguised as residences, blocked the view of a junkyard. Crowded tenement houses were interspersed with an automobile repair shop, a dry-cleaning plant, and an armature-wiring factory."

The school closed in 1982 and was demolished the following year.

== Importance to Black Community ==
Being a train porter was one of the best jobs available to Black men in the early half of the 20th century, so the Little Burgundy Black community grew because of its inexpensive accommodation and proximity to Bonaventure and Windsor railway stations. Royal Arthur was the elementary school attended by most Black students and the primary source of youth in programs at the Negro Community Centre of Montreal (NCC). In the NCC's early years, many of its activities took place at the Royal Arthur.

By 1945, 151 Black students attended Royal Arthur, at least a quarter of the student body. About half the 420 students were Black in 1970–71, but enrolment had started to drop because of urban renewal, and Black students were caught in the middle of fights over the future of English schools in Quebec. By the time Royal Arthur closed, its enrolment was 70-80% Black, and the closure took the "heart" out of the local Black community.

== The Amazing Miss A ==
In 1968, Professor Eigil Pedersen of McGill University started studying how IQ changed from Grades 3 to 6 for students who had attended Royal Arthur about 30 years earlier, and how this was correlated with adult status and achievement. During the time period under study, most Grade 1 students were taught by one of three teachers: "A", "B", and "C". Only 29% of former students of teachers B and C had achieved high adult status, 40% were of low status, and less than half could remember their first grade teacher. Every former student of teacher "A", however, correctly remembered her, and 60% had achieved high adult status and none were of low status. This teacher, later referred to as "The Amazing Miss A", was subsequently revealed to be Iole Appugliese. (Note: Known to students as "Miss Apple Daisy" because of their difficulty in pronouncing her name.)

Appugliese had not received better or more privileged students, so the most likely explanation for the success of her students was the quality of her teaching. Many former pupils and teaching colleagues described how much she cared for her students and the effort she made to help them learn. "It did not matter what background or abilities the beginning pupil had, there was no way that the pupil was not going to read by the end of grade one."

Pedersen's paper greatly surprised most education researchers who then generally believed that individual teachers had little effect on long-term student success compared to factors such as financial/social status and family structure. The paper helped stimulate renewed interest in the importance of teaching quality.

== Notable Alumni and Teachers ==
- Iole Appugliese, teacher
- James Creelman, foreign correspondent
- Pauline Donalda, soprano and voice teacher
- Oliver Jones, jazz pianist and composer
- Eigil Pedersen, Professor of Education and Provost of McGill University (Note: Pedersen himself had been taught by Teacher "B" and later dropped out of high school. He eventually returned to Royal Arthur as a teacher before becoming a university professor.)
- Oscar Peterson, jazz pianist and composer
- Calvin C. Potter, Professor of Finance; possibly the first Black employee at Montreal City Hall
- Harold H. Potter, Professor of Sociology; the first Canadian-born Black sociologist hired by a Canadian post-secondary institution
- Mairuth Sarsfield, journalist, diplomat, author, broadcaster. (Note: As referenced in her autobiographical novel No Crystal Stair.)
- Daisy Sweeney, music and piano teacher
