= Fethi Mansouri =

Australian migration researcher

Fethi Mansouri is an Arab Australian Distinguished Professor in migration and intercultural studies at Deakin University, Australia, and the founding director of the Deakin Institute for Citizenship and Globalisation (ADI). In 2013, he was appointed UNESCO Chair in Comparative Research on Cultural Diversity and Social Justice.

Mansouri has published more than twenty scholarly books, over two hundred book chapters and refereed papers, delivered hundred of public lectures and been widely interviewed by Australian and international media on themes of migration, interculturalism and multiculturalism, the social impact of COVID-19, racism, and Middle Eastern politics. He is the editor of the Journal of Intercultural Studies, founding Editor-in-Chief of the Journal of Citizenship and Globalisation Studies and a co-editor of the International Journal of Social Inclusion.

== Early life and education ==
Mansouri was born in Tunisia. He undertook his undergraduate studies in his native Tunisia, and pursued his post-graduate studies China and Australia. He has been awarded a number of visiting fellowships and academic studies programs in Europe, North Africa and North America.

== Academic career ==
In 1995, Professor Mansouri joined Deakin University in Melbourne, Australia, as an associate lecturer in Middle Eastern studies. In 2008, he was awarded a research chair in migration and intercultural studies.

In 2013, Mansouri was appointed to a new UNESCO Chair in Comparative Research on Cultural Diversity and Social Justice.

In 2015, Mansouri was the founding director of the Alfred Deakin Institute of Citizenship and Globalisation, established as a Humanities and social Science research institute at Deakin University. Within his research and leadership roles, Mansouri made many submissions to parliamentary inquiries and provided expert testimony to the Select Committee on Strengthening Multiculturalism in Australia in 2017.

== UNESCO Chair ==
Mansouri has held the UNESCO Chair in Comparative Research on Cultural Diversity and Social Justice, based at Deakin University, Australia, since 2013. In 2016, he was elected Convenor of the UNESCO UniTwin Network for Inter-Religious Dialogue and Intercultural Understanding.

In February 2026 he was appointed Adjunct Professor with the Mediterranean School of Business (MBS) at the Southern Mediterranean University (SMU) in Tunisia.

== Research and Advocacy on Muslim representation in Australia ==
Mansouri has published research, written and spoken about the experiences of Muslim communities in Australia, particularly Muslim youth. He has also written and spoken out against discrimination and islamophobia. In 2016, he co-authoured a research paper which found that "almost 60 per cent of Australians would be concerned if a relative married a Muslim." He is an advisory board member of the Australian Association of Islamic and Muslim Studies. Since 2009, he has hosted an annual intercultural and interfaith Iftar dinner, to foster intercultural understanding in the wider community.

== Contribution to the Multiculturalism/Interculturalism Debate ==
Using Australia as a case study, Mansouri has argued that, despite strong international criticism of multiculturalism as a diversity policy framework, and calls to move to interculturalism as an alternative, multiculturalism can be seen as largely complementary to interculturalism. In a conversation with Tariq Modood in 2018, Mansouri cited Australia as a working example of effective multicultural policy operating alongside intercultural work.

== Memberships and Awards ==
Mansouri was elected a Fellow of the Australian Academy of Social Sciences (FASSA) in 2020.

The Australian Newspaper's Research Magazine named Mansouri as Australia’s Top Researcher in Human Migration in 2024 and 2025.

== Selected publications ==
- Mansouri, F (2023). The Global Politics of Forced Migration: An Australian Perspective.
- Elias, A, Mansouri, F & Paradies Y (2021). Racism in Australia Today.
- Mansouri, F & Keskin Z. (eds.) (2019). Contesting the Theological Foundations of Islamism and Violent Extremism.
- Mansouri, F (ed.) (2017). Interculturalism at the Crossroads: Comparative perspectives on concepts, policies and practices.
- Tittensor, D & Mansouri, F (eds.) (2017). The Politics of Women and Migration in the Global South.
- Mansouri, F (ed.) (2015). Cultural, Religious and Political Contestations: The Multicultural Challenge.
- Mansouri, F & de B’beri B.E (eds.) (2014). Global Perspectives on the Politics of Multiculturalism in the 21st Century: A Case Study Analysis
- Isakhan, B, Mansouri, F & Akbarzadeh S. (eds.) (2012). The Arab Revolutions in Context: Civil Society and Democracy in a Changing Middle East.
- Mansouri, F & Marotta V. (eds.) (2012). Muslims in the West and the challenges of belonging.
- Mansouri, F (ed.) (2011). Australia and the Middle East: A Front-line Relationship.
- Mansouri, F & Lobo M. (eds.) (2011). Migration, Citizenship and Intercultural Relations: Looking through the Lens of Social Inclusion.
- Mansouri, F, Jenkins, L, Leach, M & Walsh, L (2009). ‘Building bridges: Creating a culture of diversity’
- Mansouri, F (ed.) (2009). Youth identity and migration: culture, values and social connectedness.
- Mansouri, F & Percival-Wood S (2008). Identity, Education and Belonging: Arab Muslim youth in contemporary Australia.
- Akbarzadeh, S & Mansouri, F (eds.) (2007). Islam and Political Violence: Muslim Diaspora and Radicalism in the West.
- Mansouri, F & Akbarzadeh, S (eds.) (2006). Political Islam and Human Security.
- Leach, M. P. & Mansouri, F (2004). Lives in Limbo: Voices of Refugee Under Protection.
