= Yanqin Wu =

Chinese-Canadian astrophysicist

Yanqin Wu (Chinese: 武延庆) is a theoretical astrophysicist whose research concerns planet formation, protoplanetary disks, the effects on planets of photoevaporation, orbital resonance, and planetary migration, and the classification and distribution of exoplanets. She has theorized that planetary collisions have culled initially crowded systems until what remains is often on the edge of chaos, and used oscillations in the rings of Saturn to study the past history of the Solar System. Educated in China and the US, she has worked in England and Canada, where she is a professor in the Department of Astronomy & Astrophysics of the University of Toronto.

== Education and career ==
Wu is originally from Guangzhou. She was an undergraduate at the University of Science and Technology of China, graduating in 1991. She became a graduate student at the California Institute of Technology, and completed her Ph.D. there in 1997. Her dissertation, Excitation and Saturation of White Dwarf Pulsation, was supervised by Peter Goldreich.

After postdoctoral research at Queen Mary University of London from 1998 to 1999, and at the Canadian Institute for Theoretical Astrophysics in Toronto from 2000 to 2003, she became an assistant professor of astronomy at the University of Toronto in 2003. She was promoted to associate professor in 2008 and full professor in 2016.

== Recognition ==
Wu is a Guggenheim Fellow, awarded in 2022. She is the 2023 recipient of the CAP-CRM Prize in Theoretical and Mathematical Physics of the Canadian Association of Physicists and Centre de Recherches Mathématiques. In May 2024, Wu was elected as an International Honorary Member of the American Academy of Arts and Sciences.
