= Robert Lacroix =

Professor of economics

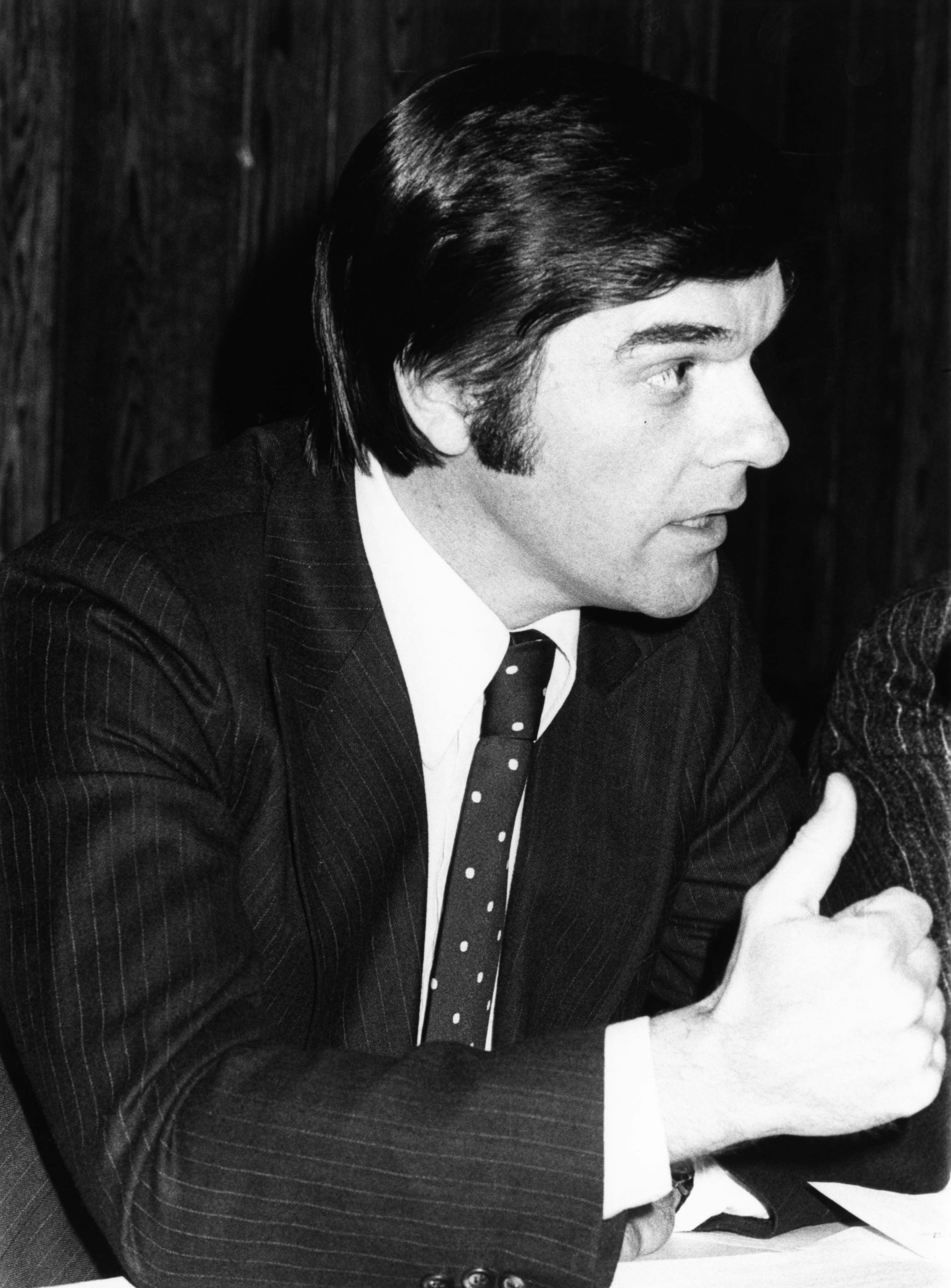
- Born: April 15, 1940 (age 86); Montreal, Quebec, Canada
- Occupations: Economist, academic

Robert Lacroix, OC OQ FRSC (born April 15, 1940) is a professor of economics at the Université de Montréal in Montreal, Quebec, Canada.

After finishing his Ph.D. in economics at Leuven, in Belgium, in 1970, he became professor at the Department of Economics of the Université de Montréal. Throughout his career, he published many articles in peer-reviewed journals, mainly in the field of labor economics. From 1987 to 1993, he served as Dean of the Faculty of Arts and Sciences at the Université de Montréal. He served as Rector of the university from 1998 until 2005.

In 2005, he was among the twelve signatories of the political manifesto Pour un Québec lucide.

He is a Fellow of the Royal Society of Canada, an Officer of the Order of Canada, an Officer of the National Order of Quebec, and recipient of the Quebec Award for Science (Prix Armand-Frappier). He is also an active Fellow at the CIRANO, a Montréal-based think tank in economics and public policy.

Academic offices
Preceded by René Simard	Recteur de l'Université de Montréal; 1998 – 2005	Succeeded by Luc Vinet
