= Ali Akbar Moosavi-Movahedi =

Iranian Biophysicist and chemist

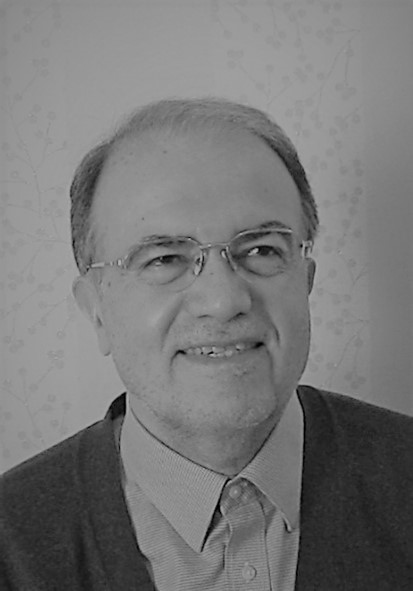
- Ali Akbar Moosavi-Movahedi in 2015
- Born: Ali Akbar Moosavi-Movahedi علی‌اکبر موسوی موحدی; February , 1953; Shiraz, Iran
- Education: BSc in Chemistry (1975) at National University of Iran (NUI) (Shahid Beheshti University); MSc in Chemistry (1979) at Eastern Michigan University (EMU), USA; PhD in Biophysical Chemistry (1986) at University of Manchester, UK
- Known for: Founder of Biophysical Chemistry in Iran, Protein Thermodynamics, Chemist
- Scientific career
- Fields: Biophysical chemistry
- Workplaces: University of Tehran, Institute of Biochemistry and Biophysics(IBB)

Ali Akbar Moosavi-Movahedi (Persian: علی‌اکبر موسوی موحدی; born February 1953) is an Iranian biophysicist, and biophysical chemist at the Institute of Biochemistry and Biophysics, University of Tehran. He is the founder of the Iran Society of Biophysical Chemistry. He is the fellow of The World Academy of Sciences (TWAS), fellow of Islamic World Academy of Sciences (IAS), and a member of the Islamic Republic of Iran Academy of Sciences.

== Education and early life ==
Ali Akbar Moosavi-Movahedi was born in Shiraz, Iran, in 1953. He attended Alborz High School in 1968, graduated from the National University of Iran (now known as Shahid Beheshti University) with a BSc in chemistry in 1975, earned his MSc in Bioanalytical Chemistry at the Eastern Michigan University in 1979, and obtained his Ph.D. in Biophysical Chemistry at the University of Manchester in 1986.

== Professional experience ==
Ali Akbar Moosavi-Movahedi's research career has been mostly marked on thermodynamics of protein denaturation especially by surfactants, protein folding/unfolding, protein glycation, biophysics of molecular diabetes, amyloid and protein aggregation and fibrillation, bioactive peptides, nutraceuticals, functional foods and artificial enzyme. He has been selected as the chair of UNESCO Chair on Interdisciplinary Research in Diabetes, University of Tehran which is mostly oriented in the area of oxidative stress and diabetes complications. He has established a highly equipped BCL laboratory for collaborations and working with different international research groups.

Ali A. Moosavi-Movahedi has been one of the pioneering scientists in establishing the first PhD programs in Biochemistry and Biophysics in Iran. He has initiated a few science and technology institutional foundations in Iran. His publications include 20 books and numerous full research papers published mostly in international research journals, mainly around structural elucidation of proteins, enzymes, and DNA strands. He is the chair of Center of Excellence in Biothermodynamics and national committee member of the International Science Council (ISC) (previous name: ICSU) at University of Tehran.

He is a member of a few national and international scientific societies and is currently the president of Iran Society of Biophysical Chemistry(ISOBC). Several awards are given to researchers by the society such as ISOBC Global Science Contribution for senior highly cited distinguished scientists, ISOBC for talented young (under 35 year) researcher, Moosavi-Movahedi Award for young (under 40 years) eminent PhD that confer to scientists in Annual ISOBC Congress. ISOBC is a member of the International Union of Biochemistry and Molecular Biology (IUBMB) and the European Biophysical Societies' Association (EBSA).

He is the founding member of the Federation of Iran Bioscience Societies (FIrBS), Universal Scientific Education and Research Network (USERN), Biochemical Society of Iran, Iranian Biology Society.

He is the Editor-in-Chief of a journal named "Science Cultivation," which publishes aimed popularization of science, policy research in science and technology, promotion of science, assisting managers and policymakers in scientific centers, steering the direction of research for scientific elites and innovators in science and technology. This Journal attempts to create the necessary context for cultivating and fertilizing new areas of sciences through monitoring, culture building, and scientific capacity building.

He supports organizing National, Regional, and International conferences in the field of Biophysical Chemistry, biothermodynamics, Biomolecular Sciences and also in the area of enculturing science and technology advancements.

He has published a new international book entitled "Rationality and Scientific Lifestyle for Health" Springer 2021.

== Awards and honors ==
- Khwarizmi International Award,
- Distinguished National Professor, 1997,
- The first-class Research Medal, University of Tehran, 2003,
- National Eminent Character 2003,
- First-rank basic science research medal in Annual Razi Medical Sciences Research Festival 2005,
- Iranian Science and Culture Hall of Fame, 2005
- Top Researcher Elsevier-Scopus International Award in the field of Biochemistry, Genetics & Molecular Biology, 2007,
- First Rank Avicenna Festival Award as Top Researcher 2008,
- Member of Academy of Sciences of Iran, 2009,
- National eminent researcher first- rank award conferred in National Research Festival by Ministry of Science, Research and Technology of Iran, 2009,
- Chosen as Eminent Professor of University of Tehran 2010,
- distinguished Professor appointed by Iran's National Elites Foundation 2012,
- Essential Science Indicators (ESI) 1% citation scientist in the field of Biology and Biochemistry since 2013,
- TWAS (The World Academy of Sciences) Fellow 2015,
- IAS (The Islamic Academy of Sciences) Fellow 2016
- COMSTECH Award for Lifetime Achievement Award in Chemistry 2021
