= René Simard (health professional) =

Canadian physician (1935–2025)

- Born: October 4, 1935; Montreal, Quebec
- Died: May 21, 2025 (aged 89)
- Occupations: physician, cancer researcher and university administrator
- Awards: Order of Canada

René Simard, OC FRSC (October 4, 1935 – May 21, 2025) was a Canadian physician, cancer researcher and university administrator.

== Early life and education ==
Born in Montreal, Quebec, he received a Bachelor of Arts from College Saint-Laurent in 1956 and a Doctor of Medicine from the Université de Montréal in 1962. He did his residency in pathology at the Mount Sinai School of Medicine and he received a Doctor of Science from the University of Paris in 1968.

== Career ==
From 1993 to 1998, he was the rector of the Université de Montréal.

He is a co-author of On Being Human: Where Ethics, Medicine and Spirituality Converge.

Simard died on May 21, 2025, at the age of 89.

== Honours ==
In 1989, he was made an Officer of the Order of Canada and a Fellow of the Royal Society of Canada.

Academic offices
Preceded by Gilles Cloutier	Recteur de l'Université de Montréal; 1993 – 1998	Succeeded by Robert Lacroix
