= Richard Hotte =

Canadian academic

- Born: 1948 (age 77–78)
- Education: Université Laval; Université Denis Diderot
- Occupations: Professor; Researcher

Richard Hotte (born 1948) is a Canadian academic and professor of information technology at the Université TÉLUQ in Quebec, Canada. He currently holds the UNESCO Chair in Global Smart Disruptive Learning.

== Early life and education ==
Hotte completed a Bachelor of Arts majoring in history with a minor in sociology in 1979, followed by a Master of Arts in history specializing in arts and popular traditions at Université Laval in 1985. He then studied for a Doctor of Philosophy in education technology at Université Laval in 1994, but he moved to France to complete a doctorate in information and communications technology applied for training and communication at Université Denis Diderot in 1998.

== Career ==
Richard Hotte's career at Université TÉLUQ began in 1978 as a tutor for history courses. He eventually became a substitute professor from 1999 to 2001. He joined the Department of Science and Technology as an associate professor of information technology in 2001. He has been a full professor at Université TÉLUQ since 2006. He has been the head of the Department of Science and Technology from 2001 to 2017.

From 2015 to 2016, he led the Kids' Smart Mobile School project.

He is the current director of the Research Institute on Cognitive Informatics and Training Environments since 2018.

He holds the UNESCO Chair in Global Smart Disruptive Learning since 2018.

He is a member of the UNESCO working group on Artificial Intelligence and the Sustainable Development Goals.
