= Amélie Quesnel-Vallée =

Canadian academic

- Education: Université de Montréal (M.Sc.), Duke University (Ph.D.)
- Occupations: Professor, researcher
- Website: ameliequesnelvallee.org

Amélie Quesnel-Vallée is a professor with joint appointment in the Departments of Sociology and of Epidemiology, Biostatistics and Occupational Health, as well as Canada Research Chair in Policies and Health Inequalities at McGill University in Montreal, Quebec, Canada.

== Academic training ==
She obtained a Master of Science (M.Sc.) from Université de Montréal in 2000, followed by a Doctor of Philosophy (Ph.D.) from Duke University in 2004. She then completed post-doctoral training in social epidemiology.

== Academic career ==
She is currently Professor with joint appointments in the Department of Epidemiology, Biostatistics and Occupational Health of the Faculty of Medicine, as well as in the Department of Sociology of the Faculty of Arts at McGill University. Apart from academic teaching, she is Director of the McGill Observatory on Health and Social Services Reforms in addition to being the Canada Research Chair in Policies and Health Inequalities. She is also a founding member of the Centre on Population Dynamics at McGill.

Amélie Quesnel-Vallée also co-authored numerous texts, including Le privé dans la santé : Les discours et les faits discussing the public healthcare system in Quebec. Her occasional columns can be read from various blogs and Canadian news sources.

== Research ==
Her research mostly focuses on social inequalities in health.

== Awards and honours ==
- Population Association of America Dorothy Thomas Award
- American Sociological Association Dissertation Award
