= Roger Gaudry =

Canadian chemist

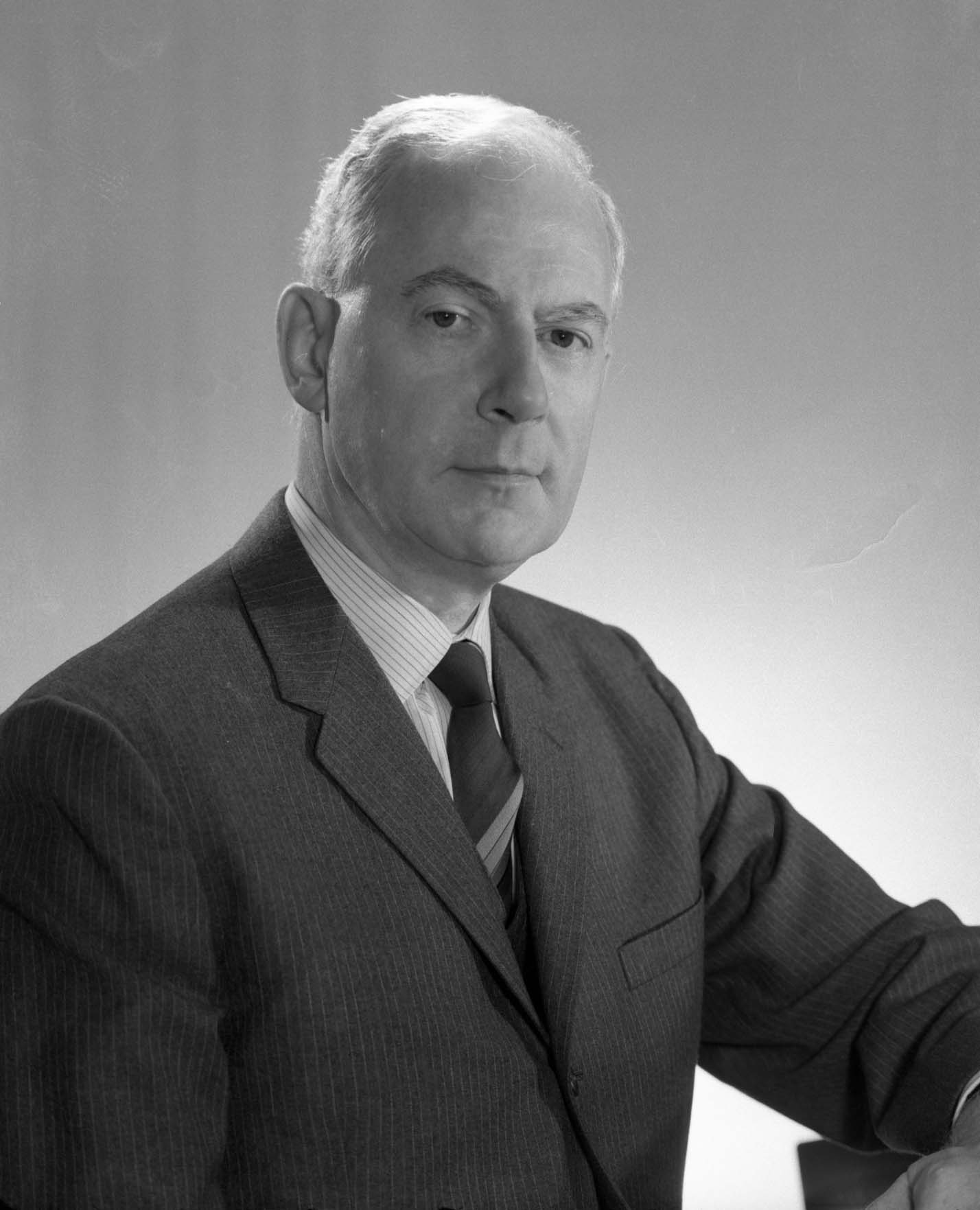
- Gaudry in 1965
- Born: December 15, 1913; Quebec City, Quebec
- Died: October 7, 2001 (aged 87)
- Resting place: Notre Dame des Neiges Cemetery

Roger Gaudry, CC GOQ MSRC (December 15, 1913 – October 7, 2001) was a Canadian chemist, businessman, corporate director, and rector of the Université de Montréal.

== Early life and education ==
Born in Quebec City, Quebec, he received a Bachelor of Science (B.Sc.) in chemistry in 1937 and a Doctor of Science (D.Sc.) in chemistry in 1940 from Université Laval. A Rhodes scholar, he attended the University of Oxford from 1937 to 1939.

== Career ==
From 1940 to 1945, he was assistant professor of chemistry in the Faculty of Medicine at Université Laval. He was appointed associate professor in 1945 and professor in 1950.

In 1954, he became assistant director of research at Ayerst, McKenna & Harrison Ltd. in Montréal From 1957 to 1965, he was director and vice-president from 1963 to 1965. From 1965 to 1975, he served as the rector of the Université de Montréal.

He was a member of the board of directors of the following companies: Connaught Laboratories Ltd., CDC Life Sciences Inc., Bank of Montreal, Alcan, Hoechst Canada, S.K.W. Canada Ltd., Bio-Recherche Ltée, Corby Distilleries Ltd, and St. Lawrence Starch Co. Ltd.

From 1983 to 1995, he was president of the Fondation Jules et Paul-Emile Léger, a Canadian charity which supports groups that help restore human dignity to those who have been rejected by society.

After his death in 2001, he was entombed at the Notre Dame des Neiges Cemetery in Montreal.

== Honours ==
- In 1954, he was made a Fellow of the Royal Society of Canada.
- In 1968, he was made a Companion of the Order of Canada.
- In 1980, he received an honorary doctorate from Concordia University.
- In 1992, he was made a Grand Officer of the National Order of Quebec.
- In 1996, he became the recipient of the José Vasconcelos World Award of Education
- In 2003, the main pavilion at Université de Montréal, Roger-Gaudry Building, was renamed in his honor.

Academic offices
Preceded by Irénée Lussier	Rector of the University of Montreal; 1965–1975	Succeeded by Paul Lacoste
