= Pierrette Gaudreau =

Canadian scientist

Pierrette Gaudreau is a Canadian scientist specializing in aging studies. She received the 2016 Prix Acfas Adrien-Pouliot for her work establishing Canada-France research partnerships.She is the wife of Rémi Quirion.

== Career ==
Gaudreau is mostly known for her work on growth hormone–releasing hormone (GHRH), but her research interests encompass all factors that play a role in human health and aging.

She is a full professor at the Université de Montréal Faculty of Medicine and manages a neuroendocrinology laboratory at the Centre de recherche du Centre hospitalier de l’Université de Montréal. She also is vice-director of the university's research center. Since 2010, she has been managing a province-wide research network on aging, bringing together hundreds of researchers and other health professionals. The group facilitates the creation of new partnerships and ultimately, to help improve health services to seniors. Among other achievements, the group was instrumental in the development of the Montreal Cognitive Assessment.

Gaudreau established a series of partnerships with research institutes in France. In 1983, she partnered with the Pasteur Institute and the Université Claude-Bernard de Lyon to conduct research on GHRH. A partnership with Université Blaise-Pascal in 1999 allowed Montreal to obtain a line of obesity-resistant rats, which continue to be used in research. Since the 2010s, she has been collaborating with the Université Aix-Marseille III and the Institut thématique multi-organismes neurosciences, sciences cognitives, neurologie et psychiatrie de Paris on research on the autonomic nervous system.

== Awards ==
- 2018: Contribution to Gerontology Award, Canadian Association on Gerontology.
- 2016: Adrien Pouliot Award, Acfas.
- 2013: Betty Havens Prize for Excellence in Longitudinal Research, Canadian Association on Gerontology.

== Selected publications ==
- Moyse, Emmanuel; Arsenault, Madeleine; Gaudreau, Pierrette; Ferland, Guylaine; Ramassamy, Charles (April 2019). "Brain region-specific effects of long-term caloric restriction on redox balance of the aging rat". Mechanisms of Ageing and Development. 179: 51–59. doi:10.1016/j.mad.2019.01.002. PMID 30659860. S2CID 58579727.
- Roy, Mathieu; Gaudreau, Pierrette; Payette, Hélène (July 2016). "A scoping review of anorexia of aging correlates and their relevance to population health interventions". Appetite. 105: 688–699. doi:10.1016/j.appet.2016.06.037. PMID 27374898. S2CID 3573008.
- Roy, Mathieu; Shatenstein, Bryna; Gaudreau, Pierrette; Morais, José A.; Payette, Hélène (August 2014). "Seniors' Body Weight Dissatisfaction and Longitudinal Associations With Weight Changes, Anorexia of Aging, and Obesity: Results From the NuAge Study". Journal of Aging and Health. 27 (2): 220–238. doi:10.1177/0898264314546715. PMID 25117180. S2CID 9553772.
