= Normand Landry =

Canadian academic

- Education: Université de Montréal; McGill University; Concordia University
- Occupations: Professor; Researcher

Normand Landry is a Canadian academic and professor of communication at Université TÉLUQ in Quebec, Canada. He is the current Canada Research Chair in Media Education and Human Rights.

== Early life and education ==
Landry completed a bachelor's degree in communication and politics followed by a master's degree in communication sciences at the Université de Montréal in 2006. He then completed a Doctor of Philosophy (Ph.D.) in communication studies at McGill University before completing postdoctoral research at Concordia University in 2010.

== Career ==
Landry has been a professor at Université TÉLUQ since 2011.

He is part of the Groupe de recherche en communication politique at Université Laval.
