= Gilles Paradis =

Canadian physician-scientist

Gilles Paradis FRCPC
- Education: Université de Montréal, McGill University, Stanford University
- Occupations: Physician, Professor, Researcher

Gilles Paradis is a Canadian consultant physician at the Institut national de santé publique du Québec, professor in the Department of Epidemiology, Biostatistics, and Occupational Health, and Strathcona Chair in Epidemiology at McGill University in Montreal, Quebec.

== Biography ==
He obtained his Doctor of Medicine at Université de Montréal and subsequently pursued residency training in family medicine at Hôpital du Sacré-Coeur de Montréal and at the Montreal General Hospital within the McGill University Health Centre (MUHC). He went on to earn a Master of Science in epidemiology and completed further residency training in the specialized field of public health and preventive medicine at McGill University within the MUHC. He completed a two-year fellowship at Stanford University in the Center for Disease Prevention Research. His Royal College of Physicians and Surgeons of Canada fellowship certification in Public Health and Preventive Medicine was issued in November 1987.

In 1989, he returned to Montreal and began practicing public health, initially at the Direction de santé publique de Montréal, and then from 2005 onwards, at the Institut national de santé publique du Québec.

In 2012, he was appointed Chair of the Department of Epidemiology, Biostatistics, and Occupational Health at McGill University, in addition to becoming to the holder of the Strathcona Chair in Epidemiology.

== Research ==
His research mostly focuses on the epidemiology of chronic cardiovascular diseases amongst children and adolescents.
