= Guy Breton =

Canadian academic administrator (born 1950)

Guy Breton CM OQ
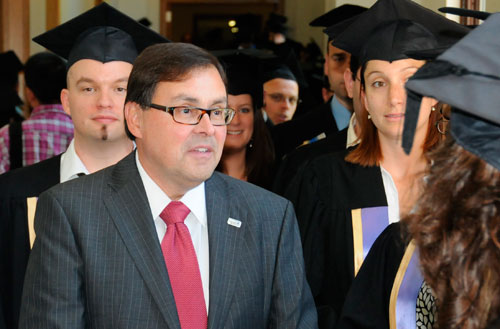
- Breton in 2010

11th Rector of the Université de Montréal
- In office June 1, 2010 – May 31, 2020
- Preceded by: Luc Vinet
- Succeeded by: Daniel Jutras

Personal details
- Born: April 1, 1950 (age 76) Saint-Hyacinthe, Quebec, Canada
- Education: Université de Sherbrooke (BA), (MD); McGill University (Res.)
- Occupation: Radiologist

Guy Breton CM OQ (born April 1, 1950, in Saint-Hyacinthe, Quebec) is a Canadian radiologist and academic administrator. From 2010 to 2020, he was rector of the Université de Montréal in Quebec, Canada.

== Early life and education ==
Breton received a Bachelor of Arts from the Séminaire de Saint-Hyacinthe, as well as a medical degree (M.D.) in 1974 from Université de Sherbrooke. After completing a residency in diagnostic radiology at McGill University, he complemented his training with a fellowship in neuroradiology at the Montreal Neurological Institute and Hospital.

== Career ==
In 1979, he joined the Department of Radiology, Radio-Oncology and Nuclear Medicine at the Université de Montréal, where he was promoted to full professor in 1994, and became head of the department in 1996. He has also served as president of the Association des radiologistes du Québec from 1987 to 1997, where he negotiated budgets on behalf of nearly 500 radiologist members. In 2010, he was appointed as the rector of the Université de Montréal.

== Honours ==
In 2009, he was awarded the Albert Jutras Prize from the Association des radiologistes du Québec.

In 2014, Breton was named a Member of the Order of Canada and, in 2020, and officer of National Order of Quebec.

Academic offices
Preceded by Luc Vinet	11th Recteur de l'Université de Montréal; 2010 – 2020	Succeeded by Daniel Jutras
