= Donna Yates (professor) =

Archeologist

Donna Elizabeth Yates

Academic background
- Education: University of Glasgow; University of Cambridge; Boston University
- Thesis: Archaeological practice and political change : transitions and transformations in the use of the past in nationalist, neoliberal and indigenous Bolivia (2012)

Academic work
- Discipline: Criminology, Archaeology
- Institutions: University of Glasgow; Maastricht University
- Website: Anonymous Swiss Collector

Donna Yates is a criminologist, archaeologist, and Associate Professor in the Department of Criminal Law and Criminology at Maastricht University where she holds the UNESCO Chair in Cultural Heritage and Emerging Crime. Her research considers crime relating to different forms of cultural property, antiquities trafficking, art crime, and exploitation of cultural goods markets for money laundering, white collar crime, and financial crime.

== Education ==
Yates holds a bachelor's degree in Archaeology from Boston University (2004), an MPhil (2006) and PhD (2012) in Archaeology from the University of Cambridge, and a PhD in Criminology from the University of Glasgow (2024). Her MPhil thesis documented the sale of looted South American antiquities in auctions in the United States, and her first doctoral dissertation covered the sociology of archaeology and heritage in Bolivia. Her second PhD, awarded for prior published work, developed a framework for the global illicit trade in antiquities.

== Research and career ==
Her interest in illicit antiquities began in 2003, when she worked at a Maya archaeological site that had been looted. She has been quoted in numerous reports on cultural heritage issues, including in the New York Times, Washington Post, and The Economist. After earning her doctoral degree, Yates joined the Scottish Centre for Crime and Justice Research at the University of Glasgow.

From 2012 to 2015, Yates held a Leverhulme Trust Early Career Fellowship and a Core Fulbright Award to study the trafficking of Latin American antiquities. Her grant project used fieldwork in Bolivia, Belize, and Mexico to analyse relationships between communities, governments, the law, and transnational criminal organisations to study the effectiveness of regulatory mechanisms for controlling the illicit antiquities trade.

In 2018, the European Research Council awarded Yates a five-year grant of €1,500,000 to study “criminogenic collectables,” or objects that seem inspire criminal behaviour by those collecting them, specifically cultural objects, fossils, and collectable rare wildlife. Crimes relating to palaeontological objects have become a focal point of her research ever since. Yates moved to Maastricht University where she was appointed Associate Professor of Criminology in 2020.

In March 2026, Maastricht University announced that Yates has been appointed UNESCO Chair in Cultural Heritage and Emerging Crime. The Chair was created to foster future-oriented research that employs a wide understanding of the notions of crime and heritage and investigates new opportunities for heritage crime, new forms of heritage and their susceptibility to crime, knock-on effects of climate change and its repercussions for heritage, and uncertainty and heritage crime potential relating to developments in LLMs.

Yates has created a number of digital projects related to the illicit traffic in cultural goods, most of which are not actively maintained.

- Trafficking Culture: "a research consortium that produces evidence-based research into the contemporary global trade in looted cultural objects."
- Property of an Anonymous Swiss Collector: a blog about "antiquities theft, art crime, and the complexities of cultural objects."
- Culture Crime News: "a growing database of antiquities and art crime articles from the popular press."
- Stolen Gods: a blog reporting on "the theft and destruction of sacred art from around the world."

== Selected publications ==
=== Books ===
- Tremain, Cara G.; Yates, Donna, eds. (2019). The Market for Mesoamerica: Reflections on the Sale of Pre-Columbian Antiquities. University Press of Florida.
- Mackenzie, Simon; Brodie, Neil; Yates, Donna; Tsirogiannis, Christos (2019). Trafficking Culture: New Directions in Researching the Global Market in Illicit Antiquities. Routledge. doi:10.4324/9781315532219.
- Oosterman, Naomi; Yates, Donna, eds. (2021). Crime and Art: Sociological and Criminological Perspectives of Crimes in the Art World. Springer Cham. doi:10.1007/978-3-030-84856-9.
- Oosterman, Naomi; Yates, Donna, eds. (2023). Art Crime in Context. Springer Cham. doi:10.1007/978-3-031-14084-6.
- Yates, Donna (2024). Interfaces and trafficking networks blurring on the margins of source, transit, and market in the transnational illicit trade in cultural objects (PhD thesis). University of Glasgow.

=== Articles ===
- Yates, Donna (2015). "Museums, collectors, and value manipulation: tax fraud through donation of antiquities" (PDF). Journal of Financial Crime. 23 (1): 173–186. doi:10.1108/JFC-11-2014-0051.
- Yates, Donna (2017). ""Community Justice," Ancestral Rights, and Lynching in Rural Bolivia" (PDF). Race and Justice. 10: 3–19. doi:10.1177/2153368717713824. S2CID 148869781.
- Yates, Donna; Peacock, Emily (2023). "T. rex is Fierce, T. rex is Charismatic, T. rex is Litigious: Disruptive Objects in Affective Desirescapes". International Journal of Cultural Property. 30 (4): 396–418. doi:10.1017/S0940739124000055.
- Yates, Donna; Peacock, Emily (2024). "The artification of fossils in commercial art spaces: Dinosaurs in a desirescape". Journal of Material Culture. 29 (3). doi:10.1177/13591835241248291.

=== Book chapters ===
- Yates, Donna (2016-12-22), "The Global Traffic in Looted Cultural Objects", in Pontell, Henry N. (ed.), Oxford Research Encyclopedia of Criminology and Criminal Justice, Oxford University Press, doi:10.1093/acrefore/9780190264079.013.124, ISBN 978-0-19-785140-1
- Hübschle, Annette; Mackenzie, Simon; Yates, Donna (2026), "Variably Legal and Irregularly Regulated: Global Markets in Collectable Antiquities, Wildlife, and Fossils", in Paoli, Letizia; Lord, Nicholas (eds.), Variably Legal Markets, London: Routledge, pp. 135–150, doi:10.4324/9780429197192-8, ISBN 978-0-429-19719-2
