= Université TÉLUQ =

Distance learning university in Quebec, Canada

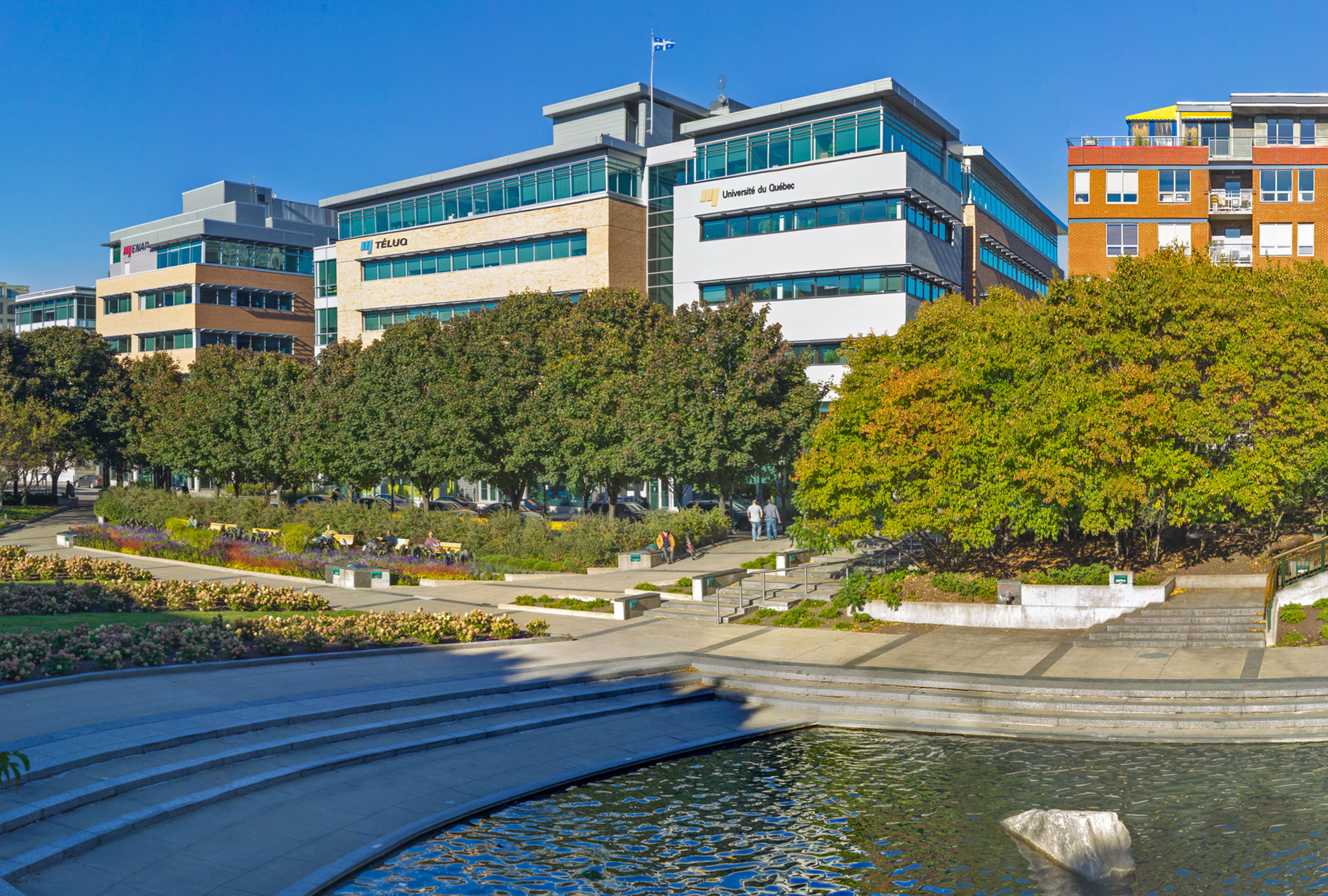
- Université TÉLUQ headquarters in Quebec City
- Type: Public
- Established: 1972
- Affiliations: Université du Québec; CVU; AUCC
- Rector: Lucie Laflamme
- Academic staff: ~90 professors
- Undergraduates: c. 20,000 (distance learning)
- Location: 455, rue du Parvis; Quebec City, Quebec; G1K 9H6; 46°48′50.04″N 71°13′22.44″W
- Campus: Distance learning
- Website: https://www.teluq.ca/
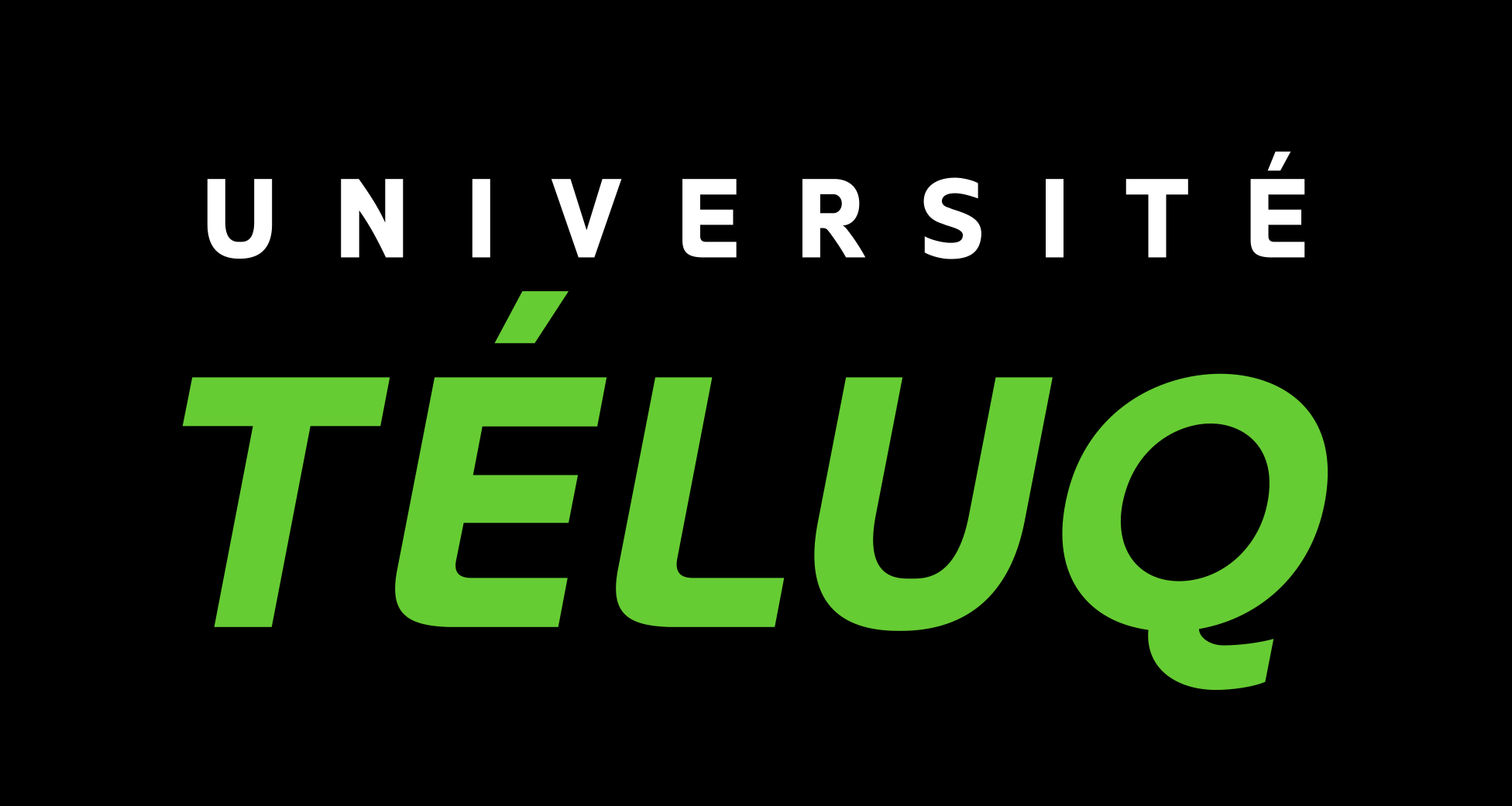

Université TÉLUQ is a public French-language distance learning university, part of the Université du Québec system. Originally founded in 1972 as the Telé-université, Université du Québec commission to develop distance education courses, Université TÉLUQ is now a full university which offers programs in undergraduate and graduate studies. It is the only French-language university education institution in North America to offer all of its courses and programs at all three university cycles remotely and continuously. Though it is based in Quebec City, Quebec, about two thirds of its professors work from its Montreal offices.

== Legal status ==
Télé-université was established as a higher school by letters patent under the great seal, under decree 264-92 issued on February 26, 1992. On October 26, 2005, its letters patent were transferred to the Université du Québec à Montréal (UQAM), to which it was attached. The Télé-université was re-established on December 14, 2011 as a higher school. A member of the Université du Québec network since 1972, it has had its own board of directors since 1992. Its head office is located in Quebec, but it also has offices in Montreal.

== Students ==
It has over 20,000 distant learning students per year, more than half of them in the Montreal area. Most students (71%) are females and over the age of 35 (60%). About a third of all students (35%) taking courses at TÉLUQ are from other universities or in on-campus programs. About a fifth of the student population (22%) holds a degree.

There is a student union AÉTÉLUQ. It was created on October 3, 1994 and has as its principles democracy within its bodies, full participation within university bodies, transparency, accessibility to public education.

=== Programs of study ===
Université TÉLUQ offers hundreds of programs at all levels of study, from bachelor's degrees to master's and Ph.D.s, offered jointly with UQAM. Programs are offered by four departments:

- School of Administrative Sciences
- Department of Education
- Department of Science and Technology
- Department of Humanities, Languages, and Communication

Once a program is completed, the diploma is awarded by the Université du Québec.

=== Free access courses ===
Since the fall of 2014, TÉLUQ University has been offering Massive Open Online Courses (MOOCs). Also, several courses offer everyone access to all or a substantial part of their content. Some are released under a Creative Commons (CC) license.

== Teaching methods ==
Université TÉLUQ offers several types of courses. Support format includes paper, DVDs, and Web sites (using content management tools such as SPIP).

Courses are designed by teams led by a professor. Teams include research assistants, associate designers, education science specialists, proof readers and other edition staff.

Under the authority of a professor, tutors help students and mark assignments. Further information in the French version of Wikipedia.

== Research ==
The strategic research sectors of TÉLUQ University are:

- Distance education, educational sciences
- Cognitive Computing
- Issues of the knowledge economy
- Society, culture and communication
- Health
- Environment

As a pioneer in distance education in North America, TÉLUQ University has developed a field of research skills in the fields of distance education, which relies on a critical mass of professors and researchers who work in particular on:

- Educational technologies
- Learning models
- Recognition of prior learning
- Student success factors
- Open and massive online courses

Université TÉLUQ has a research center in cognitive computing: LICEF as well as the Jacques-Couture Institute, which supports innovations in teaching, research and community services focusing on mastering the French language and improving knowledge of Quebec society.

Université TÉLUQ has three Canada research chairs, two of which were obtained in February 2016:

- Canada research chair in Media Education and Human Rights, held by Professor Normand Landry;
- Canada research chair in ethical judgment, held by Professor Lonzozou Kpanake
- Canada research chair in biomedical data analysis, added in January 2017 and held by Professor Neila Mezghani

Université TÉLUQ signed the Berlin Declaration on Open Access to Knowledge in the Sciences and Humanities. Accordingly, it offers an open access repository where the public can access the research works it produces.

== Notable faculty and alumni ==
- Richard Hotte – professor of information technology at Université TÉLUQ and current UNESCO Chair in Global Smart Disruptive Learning
- Normand Landry – professor of communication at Université TÉLUQ and current Canada Research Chair in Media Education and Human Rights
- Gilbert Paquette
- Éric Bédard (historian)
