= Bianca Dittrich (physicist) =

German theoretical physicist (born 1977)

- Born: Bianca Dittrich; 1977 (age 48–49); Germany
- Education: Max Planck Institute for Gravitational Physics
- Known for: Loop quantum gravity, Spin foam models of Quantum gravity
- Scientific career
- Fields: Quantum gravity
- Workplaces: Perimeter Institute for Theoretical Physics
- Thesis: Aspects of Classical and Quantum Dynamics of Canonical General Relativity (2005)
- Doctoral advisor: Thomas Thiemann

Bianca Dittrich (born 1977) is a German theoretical physicist known for her contributions to loop quantum gravity and the spin foam approach to quantum gravity. She has been a faculty member at Perimeter Institute for Theoretical Physics in Waterloo, Ontario, Canada since 2012. She is also currently an adjunct professor at the University of Waterloo.

Dittrich received her PhD in 2005 from the Max Planck Institute for Gravitational Physics in Potsdam, Germany, under the supervision of Thomas Thiemann. She then worked as a Postdoctoral Research Fellow at the Perimeter Institute until 2008, as a Marie Curie Fellow at Utrecht University until 2009 and as the Max Planck Research Group Leader at Max Planck Institute for Gravitational Physics until 2012. In 2012, she was appointed to the research faculty at the Perimeter Institute.

Dittrich has made important contributions to loop quantum gravity, spin foam models and cosmological aspects of quantum gravity. She is currently focusing on investigating the large scale behavior of spin foam models.

In 2007 she was awarded the Otto Hahn Medal for young scientists from the Max Planck Society. In 2008-2009 she received the Marie Curie Research Fellowship. In 2014 she was awarded the Ontario Early Researcher Award and in 2024 the Canadian CAP-CRM Prize in Theoretical and Mathematical Physics.
