= Florin Popențiu Vlădicescu =

Romanian computer scientist

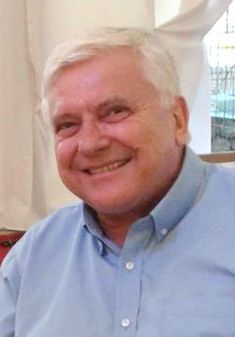

Florin Popenţiu Vlădicescu is Professor of Software Engineering.

== Career ==
He is an associated Professor at University "Politehnica" of Bucharest and since the academic year of 1997/98, he has been appointed as "UNESCO professor" at City University, London. Before that, he was a visiting professor at a number of renowned European technical universities such as the ENST- Telecom ParisTech, the ETH-Zurich or Technical University of Denmark. Prof. Florin POPENTIU VLÃDICESCU has published over 100 papers in International Journals and Conference Proceedings and is co-author of 4 books.

He has worked for many years on problems associated with software reliability and has been Co-Director of two NATO research projects involving collaboration with partner institutions throughout Europe. He is on advisory board of several international journals, Reliability and Risk Analysis: Theory & Applications. He is reviewer for ACM Computing Reviews, IJCSIS, and Associated Editor to IJICT.

Also he is a member of ENBIS, IEE, IEEE and IEEE Communications Society. Dr. Florin POPENTIU has been elected Fellow of the Academy of Romanian Scientists in 2008. He is EU Expert for H2020 and ALL EU Programme. His Research ID is E-5787-2010. Also in 2009 he has been nominated UNESCO Expert in the field of Higher Education, Research and Knowledge.

Prof. Florin POPENTIU VLÃDICESCU is currently Visiting Professor at "ParisTech" which includes the "Grandes Ecoles", The ATHENS Programme[], where he teaches courses on Software Reliability. He also lectures on Software Reliability at International Master of Science in Computer Systems Engineering - Technical University of Denmark.

== Charitable Activities ==
Professor Florin POPENTIU VLÃDICESCU is Chairman of the following Charitable Trusts:Academie des Arts "Elena Teodorini, "Elena Teodorini" Academy of Arts and Sciences - London and "Elena Teodorini" Foundation-Bucharest
