= George P. Chrousos =

Greek-American scientist (born 1951)

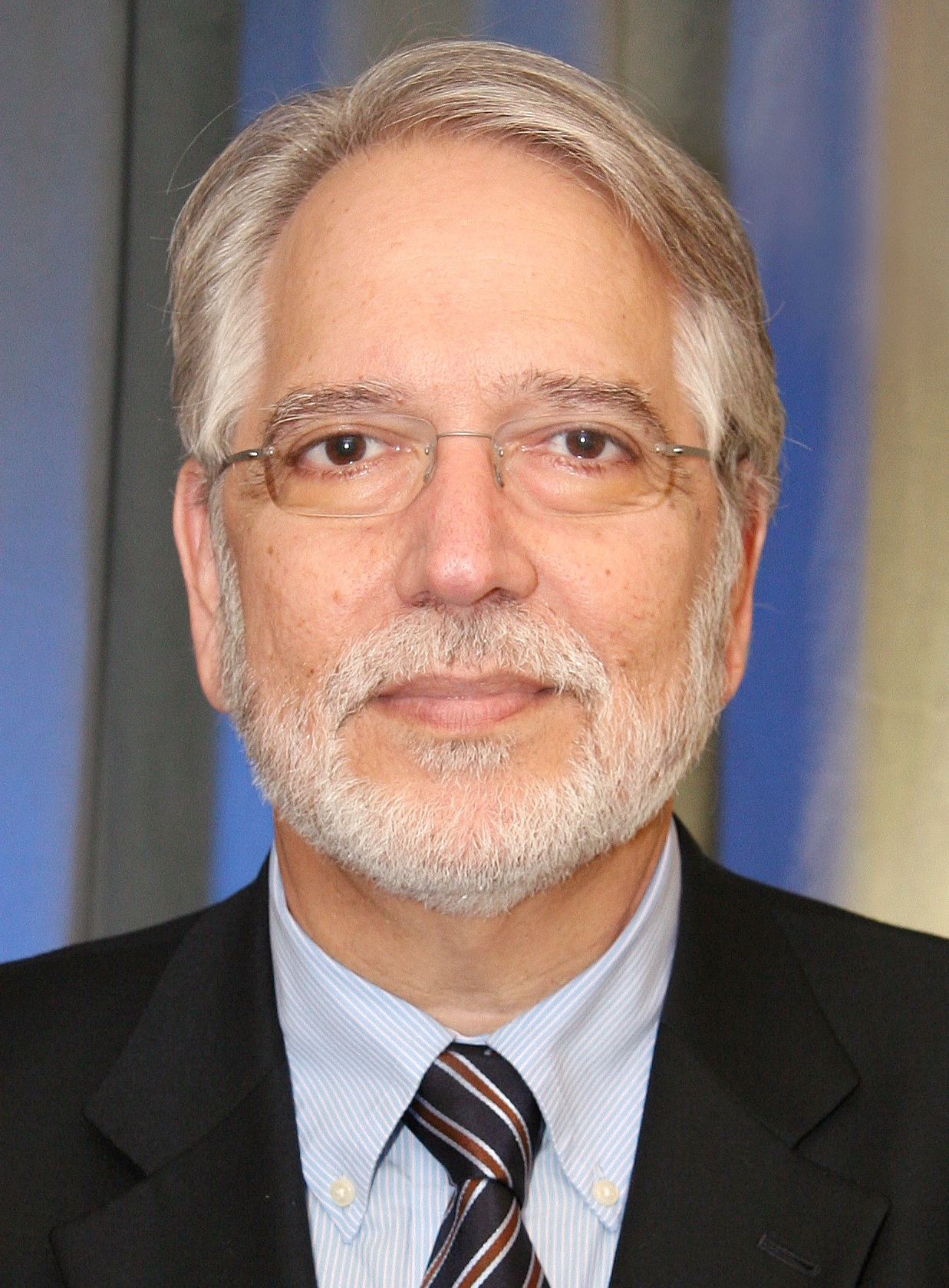
- Dr. George P. Chrousos in 2009
- Born: July 18, 1951 (age 75); Patras, Greece
- Scientific career
- Fields: Clinical medicine, Biology, Biochemistry
- Workplaces: University of Athens, NIH

George P. Chrousos is professor of Pediatrics and Endocrinology Emeritus and former chairman of the Department of Pediatrics at the Athens University Medical School, Greece. Earlier he was senior investigator, director of the Pediatric Endocrinology Section and Training Program, and chief of the Pediatric and Reproductive Endocrinology Branch of the National Institute of Child Health and Human Development (NICHD), National Institutes of Health (NIH). He is also clinical professor of Pediatrics, Physiology and Biophysics at Georgetown University Medical School and distinguished visiting scientist, NICHD, NIH. Dr. Chrousos was the first general director of the Foundation of Biomedical Research of the Academy of Athens (2001–2002). He holds the UNESCO Chair on Adolescent Health Care, while he held the 2011 John Kluge Chair in Technology and Society, Library of Congress, Washington, D.C.

According to the ISI, he is the highest cited clinical pediatrician and endocrinologist in the world. According to Google Scholar Citations he is in the list of 100 most cited scientists in the world.

== Biography ==
Chrousos was born in Patras, Greece; attended the University of Athens Medical School; and finished as the valedictorian of his class in 1975. He completed his doctorate thesis at the University of Athens, followed by a residency in Pediatrics at New York University Medical School, New York, NY, and a fellowship in Endocrinology, Metabolism and Diabetes at the Clinical Center of the National Institutes of Health, Bethesda, Maryland. He is Board Certified in Pediatrics/Endocrinology, Metabolism and Diabetes. He has held the directorship of the ACGME-accredited Affiliate NIH/Georgetown University Pediatric Endocrinology Training Program, was the chief of the Pediatric Endocrinology Section, and chief of the Pediatric and Reproductive Endocrinology Branch, NICHD, NIH. Dr. Chrousos went from assistant professor to full professor of Pediatrics at Georgetown University, which he still holds, in addition to his professorship at Athens.

== Research ==
Chrousos has focused his research on the hypothalamic–pituitary–adrenal axis (HPA axis) and has studied the neuroendocrine alterations associated with mood disorders, sleep, pain perception, and immune function. In particular, he has worked on the glucocorticoid signaling system, diseases of the HPA axis, such as Cushing's syndrome, Addison's disease, and congenital adrenal hyperplasia, and the physiologic and molecular mechanisms of stress. Early in his career, he described in the Journal of Clinical Investigation the Glucocorticoid Resistance Syndrome, a rare genetic disease of the glucocorticoid receptor that causes hypertension and hyperandrogenism in children and adults. Subsequently, he has contributed significantly to the publications on this syndrome, which has served as a model of the study of the physiologic functions of these key steroid hormones that regulate the homeostasis of the organism.

== Publications ==
He is one of the most cited physician scientists in the world (Institute of Scientific Information) in the fields of "Clinical Medicine" and "Biology and Biochemistry".

== Teaching ==
He taught at the University of Ioannina Medical School, Greece for 10 years (1980–1990).

== Honors ==
- 2018 “The 2018 Litchfield Lecture”, University of Oxford, Oxford, UK
- 2018 Professor of Medicine Emeritus, National and Kapodistrian University of Athens, Athens
- 2018 Honorary Lifetime Member of the Hellenic Society for the Study of Attention Deficit Hyperactivity Disorder Syndrome, Athens
- 2018 Honorary Award, 2018 Healthcare Business Awards, Athens
- 2018 Aristotle Gold Medal, International Society of Neurobiology and Psychoneuropharmacology, Kavala, Greece
- 2017 The “2017 Peter Heimann Lecture”, International Society of Surgery and International Association of Endocrine Surgeons, Basel, Switzerland
- 2017 Honorary President, Pediatric Society of Cyprus, Nicosia, Cyprus
- 2017 Honorary Professor, Xi’an Medical University, Xi’an, China
- 2016 Honorary Professor, St. Petersburg State Pediatric Medical University, St. Petersburg, Russia
- 2016 “Herald of the Hippocratic Spirit”, Society for the Dissemination of the Hippocratic Spirit, Athens, Greece
- 2016 The 2016 Robert M Blizzard Presidential Lecture, Pediatric Endocrine Society, Baltimore USA
- 2015 The 2015 Richard Kvetnansky Lecture, Institute of Experimental Endocrinology, Slovac Academy of Sciences, Bratislava, Slovakia
- 2014 George Papanicolaou Award, University of Athens, Athens
- 2014 Award of Academic Excellence, Alexander Onassis Foundation Scholars, Athens
- 2014 Fred Conrad Koch Award, The US Endocrine Society
- 2013 Honorary Professor, Warwick University, Coventry, UK
- 2012 UNICEF Award, National UNICEF Committee, Athens, Greece
- 2012 Albert Struyvenberg Medal, European Society of Clinical Investigation
- 2011 Constantine Moiras Award, Academy of Athens, Athens, Greece
- 2011 The Bodossaki Aristeion Prize, Bodossaki Foundation, Athens, Greece ( https://web.archive.org/web/20110910235805/http://www.bodossaki.gr/Default.aspx?lang=2)
- 2011 John Kluge Chair in Technology and Society, Library of Congress, Washington, D.C.
- 2010 Member, Academia Europaea , London, UK
- 2010 Member, Institute of Medicine , The National Academies, Washington, D.C.
- 2010 Philip S. Hench Memorial Lecture, American College of Rheumatology, Atlanta, GA.
- 2010 UNESCO Chair on Adolescent Health Care, University of Athens, Athens, Greece
- 2009 Mortimer B. Lipsett Memorial Lecture, NIH.
- 2008 Geoffrey Harris Award, European Society of Endocrinology
- Doctor Honoris Causa from the Universities of Liege, Belgium, Ancona, Italy, and Patras, Greece
- President of the European Society of Clinical Investigation
- Honorary Fellow (FRCP), Royal College of Physicians, London, UK
- Master of the American College of Endocrinology (MACE)
- Master of the American College of Physicians (MACP),
- 2004 Lifetime Achievement Award of the International Society of Psychoneuroendocrinology
- 2002 Sir Edward Sharpey-Schafer Medal of the British Endocrine Societies
- 1999 Novera Herbert Spector Award of the International Society of Neuroimmunomodulation
- 1997 Hans Selye Award, Hans Selye Foundation
- 1997 Clinical Investigator Award,
- 1987 Richard Weitzman Award, The US Endocrine Society

== Selected papers ==
- Chrousos, G.P., Gold, P.W. (1992). The Concepts of Stress and Stress System Disorders: Overview of Physical and Behavioral Homeostasis. JAMA 267:1244-1252. Journal of the American Medical Association
- Chrousos, G.P. (1995). Seminars in Medicine of the Beth-Israel Hospital, Boston - The Hypothalamic-Pituitary-Adrenal Axis and Immune-Mediated Inflammation. New England Journal of Medicine 332:20 1351-1362.
- Gold, P.W., Loriaux, D.L., Roy, A., Kling, M.A., Calabrese, J.R., Kellner, C.H., Nieman, L.K., Post, R.M., Pickar, D., Galluci, W., Avgerinos, P., Paul, S., Oldfield, E.H., Cutler, G.B., Chrousos, G.P. (1986) Responses To Corticotropin-Releasing Hormone in the Hypercortisolism of Depression and Cushings-Disease - Pathophysiologic and Diagnostic Implications. New England Journal of Medicine 314:21 1329-1335
- Papanicolaou, D.A., Wilder, R.L., Manolagas, S.C., Chrousos, G.P. (1998) The Pathophysiologic Roles of Interleukin-6 in Humans. Ann. Intern. Med. 128:127-137.
- Gold, P.W., Goodwin, F., Chrousos, G.P. (1988) Clinical and Biochemical Manifestations of Depression: Relationship to the Neurobiology of Stress. (Part I and Part 2) N. Engl. J. Med. 319: 348-353 and 319: 413-420.
- Supplement: Selected Original and Review Papers
