= Gilles Cloutier =

Canadian physicist (1928–2014)

Gilles George Cloutier
- Born: June 27, 1928; Quebec City, Quebec
- Died: May 13, 2014 (aged 85); Laval, Quebec
- Occupations: Engineer and physicist
- Awards: Order of Canada; National Order of Quebec

Gilles George Cloutier, CC OQ FRSC (June 27, 1928 – May 13, 2014) was a Canadian physicist and former director of the Alberta Research Council.

== Early life and education ==
Born in Quebec City, he was educated at Université Laval and McGill University.

== Career ==
He was rector of the Université de Montréal from 1985 to 1993.

He died in 2014 at the age of 85.

== Honours ==
- In 1976, he was made a Fellow of the Royal Society of Canada.
- In 1981, he made an Officer of the Order of Canada.
- In 1983, he was awarded an honorary Doctor of Science from the University of Alberta.
- In 1989, he was made an Officer of the National Order of Quebec.
- In 1993, he was promoted to Companion of the Order of Canada.
- He was appointed to the Canada Foundation for Innovation.

Academic offices
Preceded by Paul Lacoste	Recteur de l'Université de Montréal; 1985 – 1993	Succeeded by René Simard
