= Negro Community Centre of Montreal =

Coordinates: 45.5022°N 73.5708°W

Children learning to weave at the Centre

The Negro Community Centre of Montreal was formed in 1927 in response to the racial discrimination experienced by the Black community. The Black population of Montreal is linked historically to descendants of Africans who were enslaved in Montreal. In the 1890s there was an influx of free Blacks arriving from the West Indies, the United States and the Maritimes to work on the construction of the railways. A meeting was held with eleven members of the Negro community in the living room of Reverend Charles Humphrey Este to find ways of improving the lives of this Black community. Rev. Charles Este, who was pastor of the West End Union United Church, the Black community's oldest religious institution, emerged as the leader of the NCC.

The early Black community of Montreal had experienced severe alienation and the NCC was one of many institutions, including the Coloured Women's Club and the Brotherhood of Sleeping Car Porters, created in that era to 'humanize their existence' in the city of Montreal. The NCC was accredited in 1928 by the Council of Social Agencies. In 1949, the NCC was incorporated under the letters of patent and registered with the provincial government and the welfare department of the City of Montreal. The NCC was a member of the Red Feather of Montreal, which provided financial support for the work of the centre and was the precursor to Centraide.

The NCC began its work by renting locations in the area known as Little Burgundy. In 1930, the NCC moved to the basement of the Union United Church, located at 3007 Delisle Street. In these early years, activities also took place in the Royal Arthur School. In 1955, the NCC moved to 2035 Coursol Street. The NCC added a gymnasium, a sewing room, a kitchen, a library, and a credit union office (Walker Credit Union) to the space. In 1965, the NCC received the deed to the building.

The centre offered various programs, including tutoring, mentorship, summer camps, a lunch program for school aged children, ballet, tap dance, basketball and music lessons, among many others. Jazz pianists Oscar Peterson and Oliver Jones crafted their skill on the NCC piano after school and on weekends.

The Black community began to move out of Montreal in the 1960s and the city began urban renewal projects which saw the destruction of homes and claiming of lands in the neighbourhood of the NCC. One stated purpose of the renewal was to construct improved housing for low-income families. The major development was the Ville Marie Expressway on the north side of St. Antoine street which brought the destruction of over 850 homes. The city of Montreal bought 75% of the land and housing which was demolished to make way for new construction. Some families were relocated up to three times within that time. They eventually grew frustrated and moved out of the area. The result of this urban renewal was that between 1968 and 1977 thousands of Black people were relocated or forced out of Little Burgundy. This decrease in the population of Blacks in the area that was served by the NCC and dispersal of the Black population to areas like LaSalle and St. Laurent led to eventual decline in the strength of the NCC.

Six decades after its inception, in 1993, the NCC ceased all activity. The organisation experienced difficulties accessing funding for its programs and maintenance cost of the building was extremely high. In April 2014, the wall of the NCC building collapsed. In November 2014, twenty years after it was last used, and after the organisation filed for bankruptcy, the NCC building was demolished.

The NCC was described as a 'mainstay of Montreal's Black Community' and welcomed Nelson Mandela during his visit to Montreal in 1990. In 2020, during the COVID-19 pandemic, a citizen group issued a call for the revival of the NCC and held a march on August 1 to support the idea.

== See also ==
- 1954 Lake of Two Mountains boating accident which led to the deaths of twelve NCC children
