= Paul Lacoste (academic) =

Canadian academic (1923–2009)

- Born: April 24, 1923; Montreal, Quebec, Canada
- Died: August 22, 2009 (aged 86); Montreal, Quebec, Canada
- Awards: Order of Canada

Paul Lacoste, OC (April 24, 1923 – August 22, 2009) was a Canadian lawyer, professor, and academic administrator.

Born in Montreal, Quebec, he received a Bachelor of Arts degree in 1943 and a Master of Arts degree in 1946 from the Université de Montréal. From 1946 to 1947, he attended the University of Chicago and in 1948 received a Ph.D. from the University of Paris. In 1960, he received his Bachelor of Civil Law from Université de Montréal.

He joined the faculty of the Université de Montréal in 1946 and taught philosophy until 1986. From 1962 to 1970 and from 1985 to 1987, he also taught law. From 1964 to 1966, he was a practicing lawyer. In 1968, he was appointed vice rector and from 1975 to 1985, he was the rector of the Université de Montréal.

He was a member on the Royal Commission on Bilingualism and Biculturalism from 1963 to 1971. From 1948 to 1963, he was also a commentator and moderator on CBC Radio and Television.

In 1977, he was made an Officer of the Order of Canada "in recognition of his many contributions as an administrator in education and public affairs".

Lacoste died in August 2009 at the age of 86.

Academic offices
Preceded by Roger Gaudry	Recteur de l'Université de Montréal; 1975 – 1985	Succeeded by Gilles Cloutier
