= Centre de Recherches Mathématiques =

Canadian mathematical research institute

Coordinates: 45°30′3″N 73°36′56″W

The Centre de recherches mathématiques (CRM) is the first mathematical research institute in Canada, located at the Université de Montréal.

The CRM has ten research laboratories, one in each of: mathematical analysis, number theory and symbolic computation, differential geometry and topology, discrete mathematics and combinatorics, applied mathematics, neuroimaging, mathematical physics, statistics, probability theory and quantum computing.

Each year it awards four of the main mathematical sciences prizes in Canada: the CRM–Fields–PIMS prize, which is the most prestigious award given in Canada in mathematics; the Aisenstadt Prize, awarded to a young outstanding Canadian mathematician; the CRM–SSC Prize, awarded in collaboration with the Statistical Society of Canada to an exceptional young Canadian statistician; and the CAP–CRM Prize in Theoretical and Mathematical Physics awarded in collaboration with the Canadian Association of Physicists in recognition of exceptional achievements in theoretical and mathematical physics.
