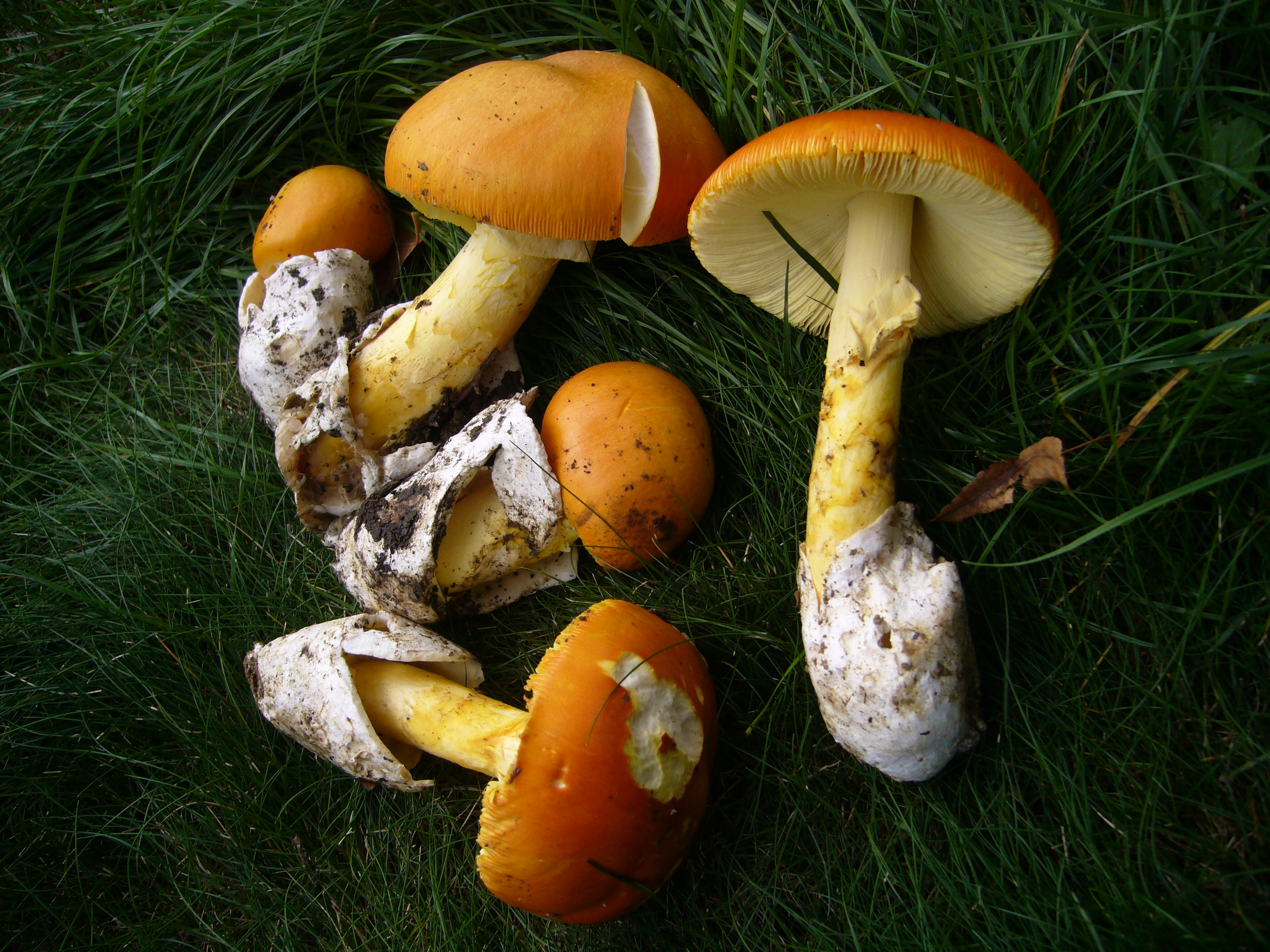

Conservation status
- Least Concern (IUCN 3.1)

Scientific classification
- Kingdom: Fungi
- Division: Basidiomycota
- Class: Agaricomycetes
- Order: Agaricales
- Family: Amanitaceae
- Genus: Amanita
- Species: A. caesarea

Binomial name
- Amanita caesarea (Scop.) Pers. (1801)

Synonyms
- Agaricus caesareus Scop. (1772)

= Amanita caesarea =

Species of fungus

Amanita caesarea
- Mycological characteristics
- Gills on hymenium
- Cap is convex
- Hymenium is free
- Stipe has a ring and volva
- Spore print is white
- Ecology is mycorrhizal
- Edibility is choice but not recommended

Amanita caesarea, commonly known as Caesar's mushroom, is a species of fungus in the genus Amanita. While it was first described by Giovanni Antonio Scopoli in 1772, it was a favorite of early rulers of the Roman Empire.

The mushroom has a distinctive orange cap, yellow gills and stipe, and contains organic acids. The species resembles poisonous species including fly agaric. A. caesarea is found in North Africa, Eurasia, and North America. It is edible, given correct identification.

== Taxonomy ==
Amanita caesarea was first described by Italian mycologist Giovanni Antonio Scopoli in 1772 as Agaricus caesareus, before later being placed in Amanita by Persoon in 1801. The common name comes from its being a favourite of the Roman emperors, who took the name Caesar (originally a family name) as a title. It was a personal favorite of Roman emperor Claudius. The Romans called it Bōlētus, derived from the Ancient Greek βωλίτης for this fungus as named by Galen. Several modern common names recognise this heritage with the English Caesar's mushroom and royal amanita, French impériale, Polish cesarski and German Kaiserling. In Italian, it is ovolo (pl. ovoli), due to its resemblance to an egg when very young. In Albanian it is kuqëlorja from its colour (< Albanian kuqe 'red'). Other common names include Amanite des Césars and Oronge.

A. caesarea was first domesticated in 1984.

== Description ==
This mushroom has an orange to red cap, initially hemispherical before convex and finally flat, reaching 20 centimetres (8 inches) in diameter. The surface is smooth, with striated margins. The gills are adnexed or free, close, and yellowish. The similarly colored (or slightly paler) stipe is 5–15 cm (2–6 in) tall and 1.5–3 cm (1/2–1 1/4 in) wide. The ring hangs loosely and is often striate. The base of the stipe is equal or bulged and seated in a white cup-like volva, a remnant of universal veil. The spores are white, producing a white to faintly yellow spore print.

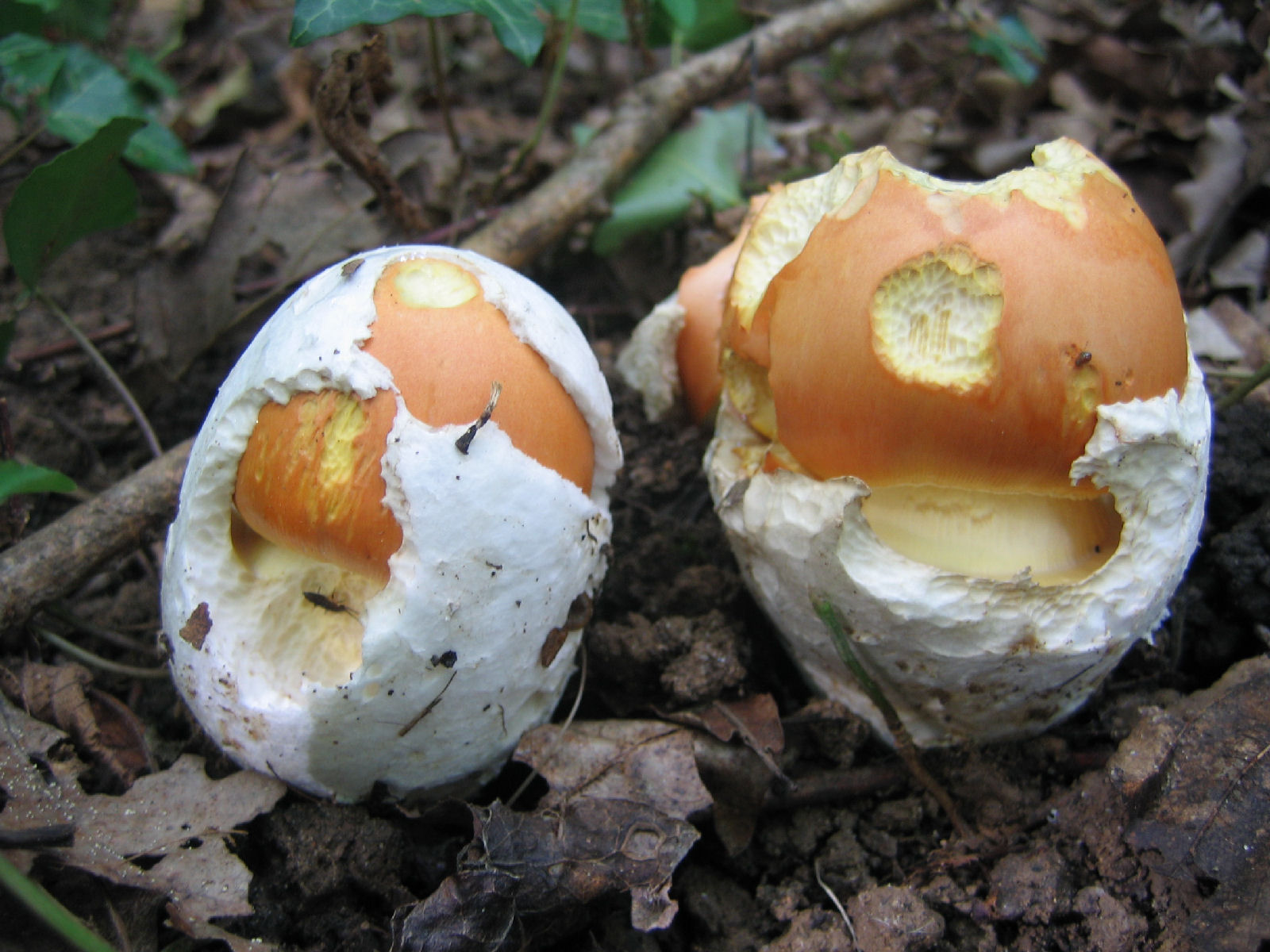
Emerging from the universal veil

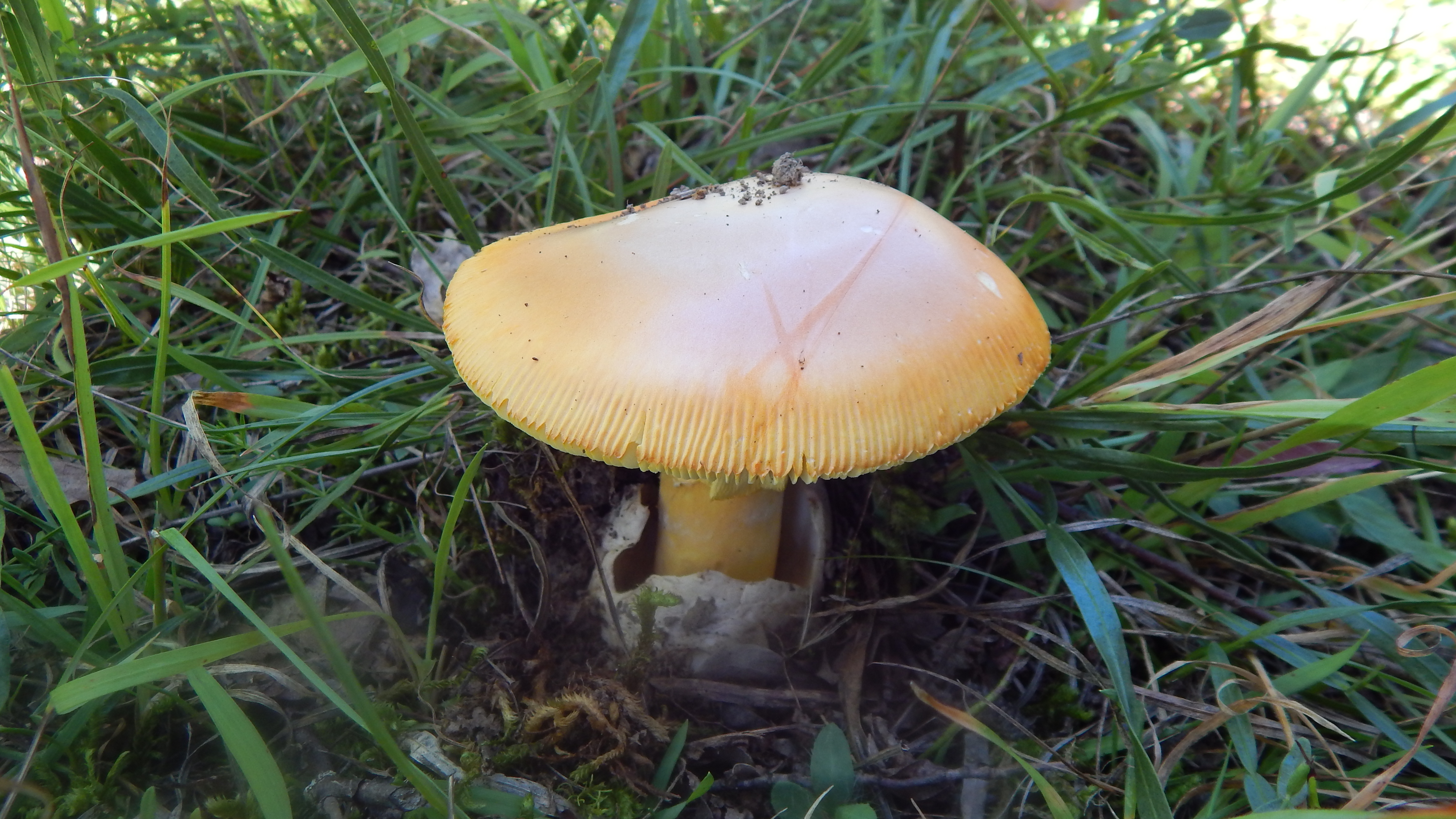
Specimen with veil fragment

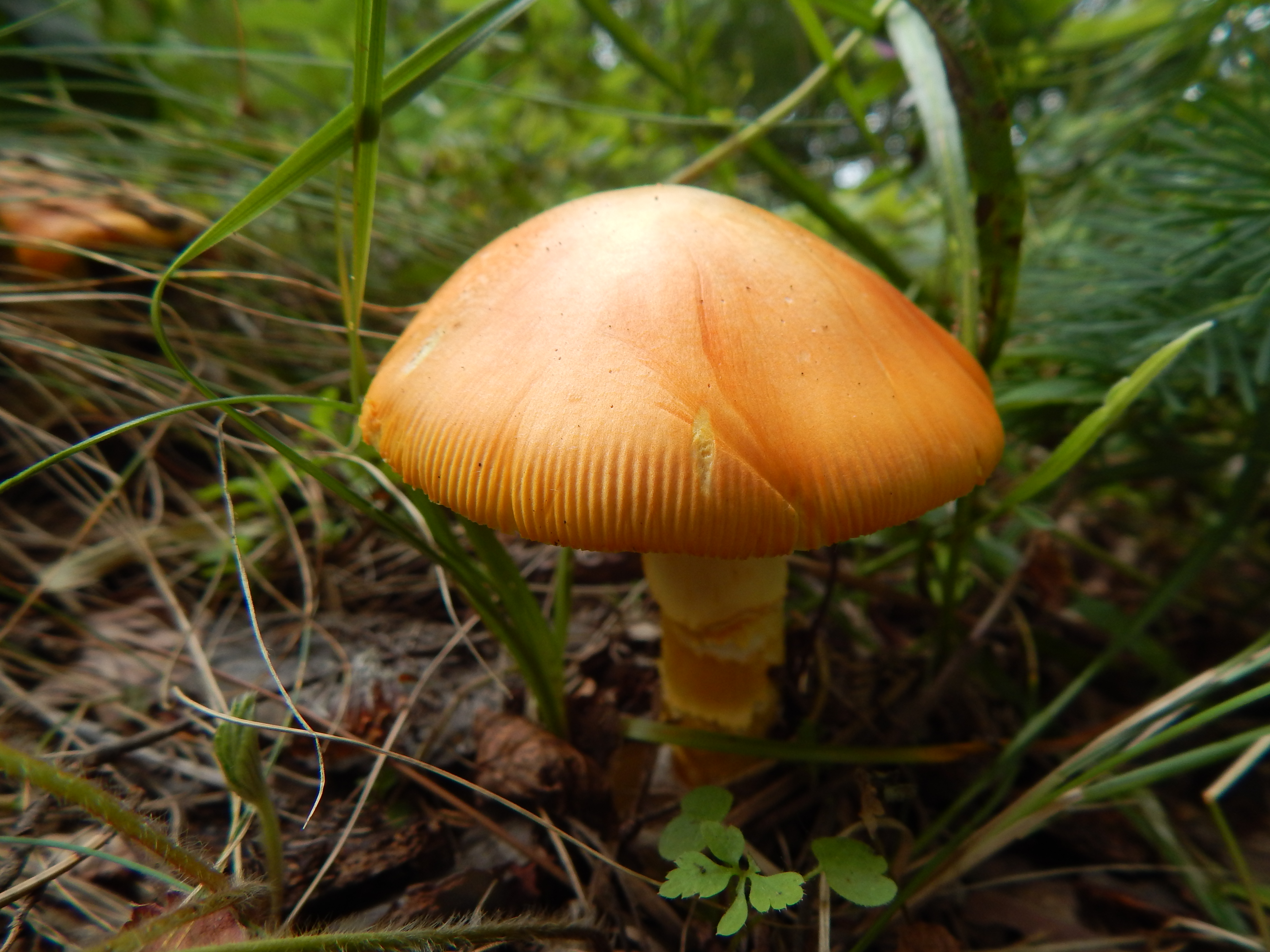
Orange-capped specimen

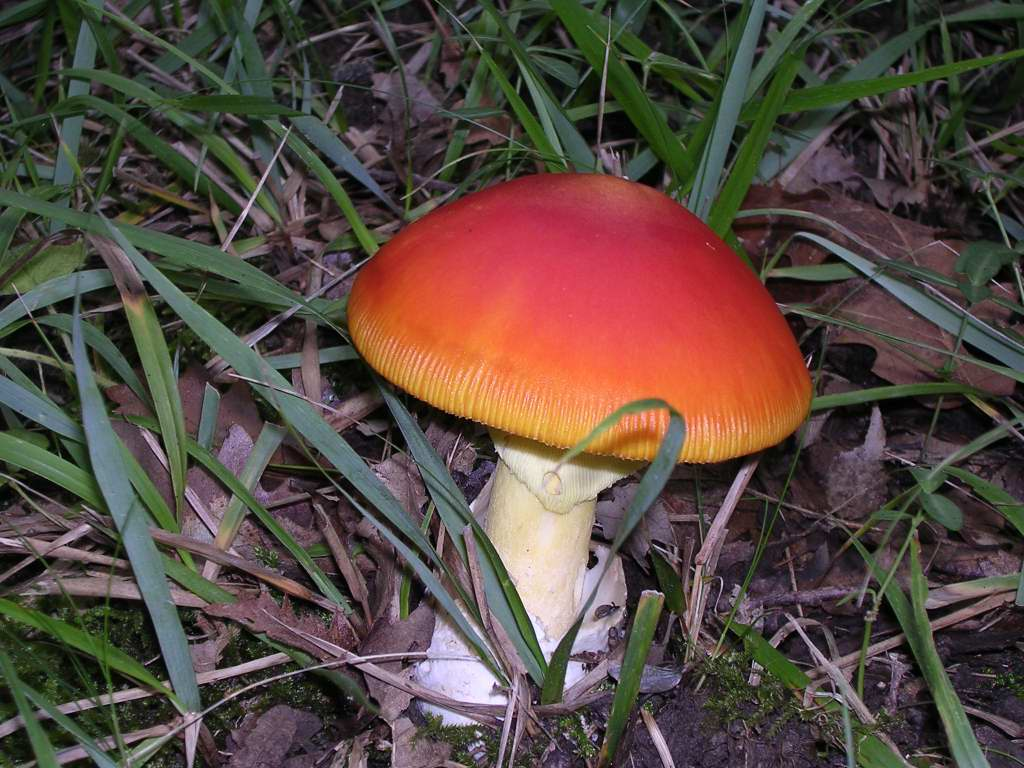
Red-capped specimen

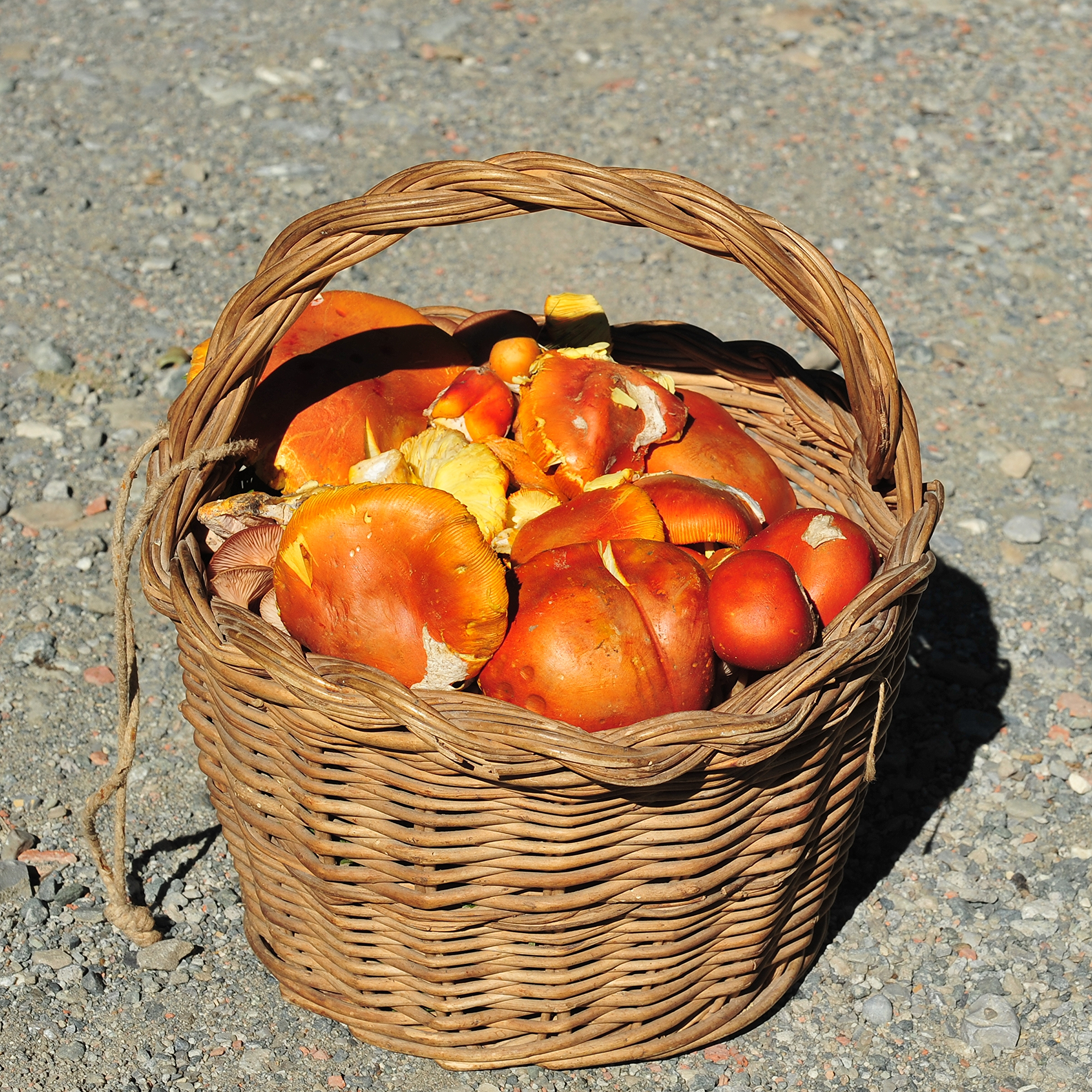
Basket of mushrooms

=== Chemical properties ===
A study of isolates from the fruit bodies of A. caesarea showed that the radial growth (increases in axon's diameter) of this species was possible at pH 6–7, and optimal growth was in a temperature of 24–28 °C (75–82 °F), depending on the isolate.

An investigation of the heavy metal content of mushroom samples found cadmium levels in A. caesarea four times greater than allowed in cultivated mushrooms by European Union standards. The amount of lead in A. caesarea also exceeded allowed levels. The study concluded that the accumulation of heavy metals may be a species-specific property of mushrooms, and that chronic consumption of some mushroom types could potentially be harmful.

A study of the organic acid composition of mushrooms found a relatively high level, about 6 g/kg, in A. caesarea. Malic acid, ascorbic acid, citric acid, ketoglutaric acid, fumaric acid, shikimic acid and traces of succinic acid were detected. Malic and ascorbic acids were the most abundant compounds. Ergosterol has also been isolated from A. caesarea.

=== Similar species ===
Similar species include the poisonous Amanita muscaria (fly agaric), which has a distinctive red cap dotted with fluffy white flakes, but these tend to fall off as the mushroom ages and the bright red tends to fade to a yellowy orange. A. muscaria has a white underside descending into a ringed volva and is typically associated with spruce, pine or birch. Certain varieties (e.g. A. muscaria var. guessowii) are close to yellow even at the juvenile stage.

A. caesarea is also similar to the poisonous death cap and destroying angels. The eastern North American species A. arkansana, A. jacksonii, and A. angelica are similar. A. calyptroderma appears in similar habitats in western North America. In Mexico, similar species include A. basii, A. garabitoana (also occurs in La Esperanza, Honduras), A. laurae, and A. yema. There are many similar species in India and China, with the most notable being A. hemibapha.

== Distribution and ecology ==
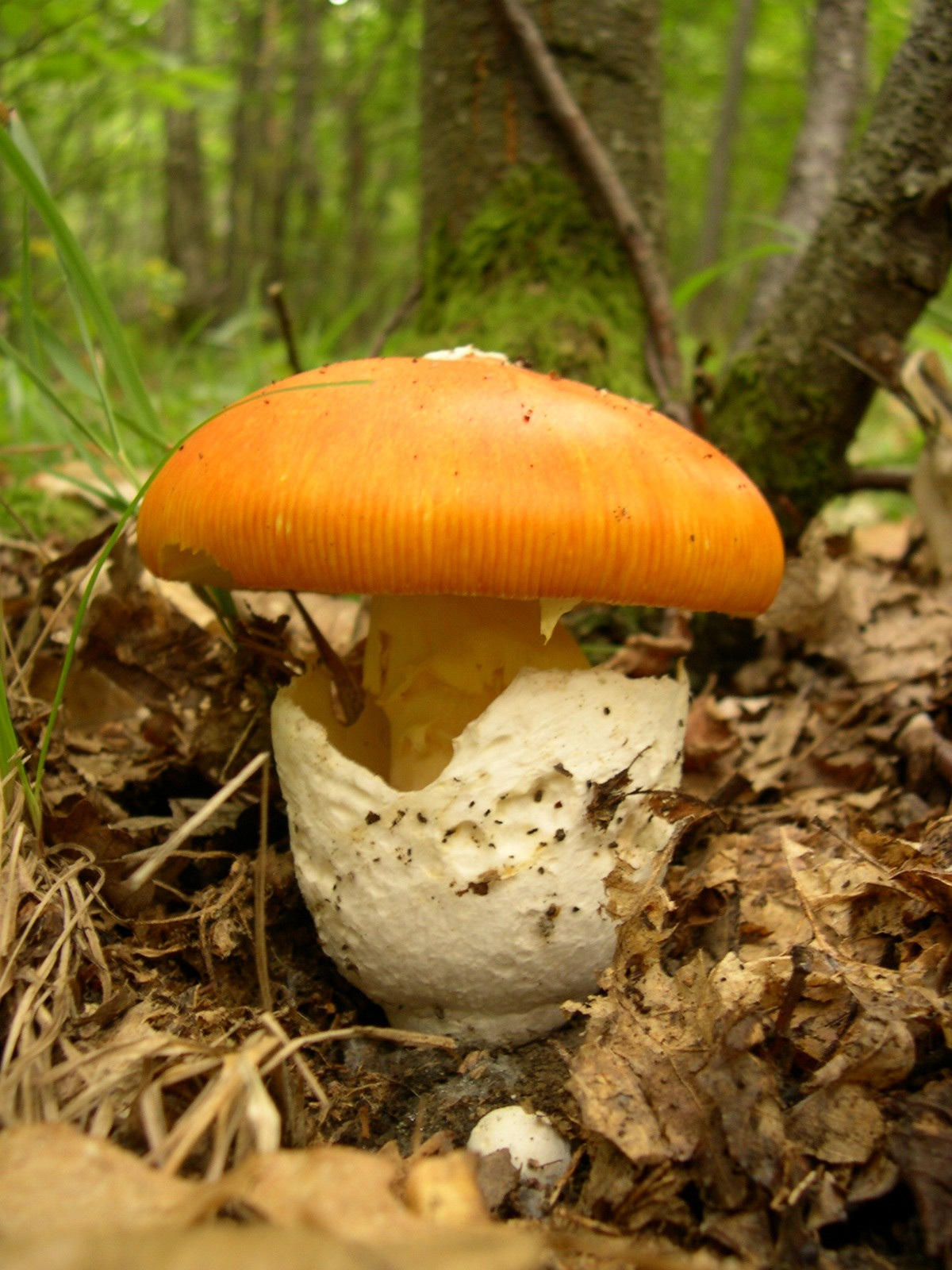
Specimen from Italy

It is found in North Africa and southern Europe, particularly in the hills of northern Italy. It is thought to have been introduced north of the Alps by the Roman armies as it is most frequently found along old Roman roads. The mushroom is also distributed in the Balkans, Hungary, and possibly Iran, although Iran is not a well explored area mycologically so may have undescribed species erroneously using the taxon.

In Europe, A. caesarea inhabits primarily oak (Note: E.g. Quercetum troianae Em. et Ht., Q. frainetto-cerris Rudsky. and Q. frainetto-cerris macedonicum Oberd.) and pine forests. It grows individually or in groups from early summer to mid autumn. In warmer climates this mushroom fruits in higher oak woodlands, sometimes mixed with conifers.

Adults of the pleasing fungus beetle Tritoma biguttata affinis have been recorded from a supposed A.caesarea; this might be a misidentification of A.angelica, A.arkansana or A.jacksonii, and in any case it does not seem to be a regular food source for them.

== Conservation ==
A. caesarea is listed in the Red Data book of Ukraine, and it is protected by law in Croatia, Slovenia, the Czech Republic and Germany.

== Uses ==
A. caesarea is a highly appreciated edible mushroom in Europe. It is traditionally gathered and consumed in Italy, where it is known as ovolo or ovolo buono (literally: good gadroon) or "fungo reale". It has been traditionally taken as food in Mexico. There it is consumed roasted with a bit of the herb epazote, Dysphania ambrosioides. The international export market developed in the 1990s.

It is widely eaten in the Himalayas and the Tibetan areas.

== See also ==
- Boletus
- List of Amanita species
