= René Roy (chemist) =

Canadian organic chemist

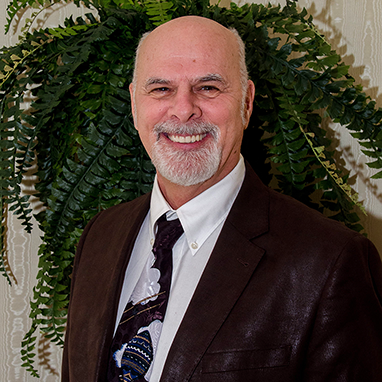
- Born: November 4, 1952 (age 73); Sherbrooke, Quebec
- Education: Université de Montréal
- Known for: Semi-synthetic glycoconjugate vaccines
- Awards: Canada Research Chair in Medicinal Chemistry (2004-2017); Gold Medal from the World Intellectual Property Organization (2005); Tech Museum Award-Technology Benefiting Humanity (2005)
- Scientific career
- Fields: Medicinal chemistry
- Workplaces: Université du Québec à Montréal; University of Ottawa; Université de Montréal
- Doctoral advisor: Stephen Hanessian

René Roy (born November 4, 1952) is a Canadian organic chemist from Quebec, specializing in glycobiology and carbohydrate chemistry. He is professor emeritus, Department of chemistry, at the Université du Québec à Montréal (UQAM) and associate professor at the Institut National de la Recherche Scientifique (INRS) – Institut Armand-Frappier (IAF). He is the founder and former director of PharmaQAM, a biopharmaceutical research center based at UQAM, focusing on the discovery of new bioactive molecules, their mechanism of action and the vectorization of drugs. He is a pioneer in the development of synthetic glycoconjugate vaccines both for human and veterinary health, having co-developed the first and sole marketed semi-synthetic vaccine for human use, preventing bacterial meningitis and pneumonia in developing countries.

== Education ==
René Roy completed his Ph.D. in carbohydrate chemistry from Université de Montréal in 1980, with Stephen Hanessian, developing synthetic methodologies and the syntheses of natural compounds using carbohydrate precursors (Chiron approach).

== Career ==
Immediately after his Ph.D, in 1980, René Roy joined the National Research Council (NRC) in Ottawa where he worked as researcher in the Institute for Biological Sciences. Then, in 1985, he began his career as professor in the department of chemistry of the University of Ottawa where he served until December 2002. In parallel, he held the positions of Associate Director of the Ottawa-Carleton Chemistry Institute from 1993 to 1996, Director from 1996 to 1999, and again Associate Director in 2000. From 2002 to 2004, he was chairman of the American Chemical Society (ACS) Division of Carbohydrate Chemistry and, in 2005, head of the ACS awards committee.

In 2008, he returned to Montreal to teach organic chemistry at the Université du Québec à Montréal. There, he also founded the PharmaQAM biopharmaceutical research center which gathers some 50 professors and 17 institutions with common interests in the molecular aspects of medicinal chemistry and drug discovery working on new bioactive molecules, their mechanism of action and the way they are vectorized in vivo. He served as director of PharmaQAM until December 2017.

During his career, René Roy has co-developed meningitis vaccines, for humans and animals, that led to commercial success. One of them, targeting the Haemophilus influenzae b (HIB) bacteria, has been designed jointly with the Cuban researcher Vincente Verez Bencomo to prevent lethal meningitis and pneumonia in developing countries. It is the first human semi-synthetic glycoconjugate vaccine approved and remains the only one. In use since 2004, more than 34 million doses have been distributed to children in several countries including Vietnam, Syria, Brazil, Venezuela and Angola, eradicating the infectious disease in Cuba. Rene Roy is a cofounder of Glycovax Pharma, a biotech company operating in Montreal, developing glycochemistry-based treatments against cancer and other disease with unmet medical needs.

== Research ==
=== Research interests ===
René Roy uses carbohydrate chemistry to develop neoglycoconjugates and polymers to treat disease related to glycoproteins such as bacterial infections and cancers. His synthesis of new glycan structures, among which glycopolymers, glycodendrimers, and glycodendrimersomes (terms that he first developed) enabled progress in the area of multivalent molecular recognition mechanisms. He is known for his work on semi-synthetic glycoconjugate vaccines. He has designed a breast cancer vaccine prototype.

René Roy has authored more than 370 scientific articles and 2 books on vaccines and glycomimetics. He has 5 patents to his credit, of which two ended in commercial products

== Honors and awards ==
- Hoffman-La Roche Award from the Canadian Society for Chemistry (1997)
- Ottawa Life Sciences Council Achievement Award (2001)
- Rotary International Paul Harris Fellowship (2001)
- National Research Council of Canada Royalty Sharing Award (2001)
- Melville L. Wolfrom Award from the American Chemical Society Division of Carbohydrate Chemistry (2003)
- Gold Medal from the World Intellectual Property Organization (WIPO) (2005)
- Tech Museum Award – Technology Benefiting Humanity the Hib Vaccine team (2005)
- Probst Memorial Lecturer – Southern Illinois University (2006)
- Award of Excellence in research from the Foundation of Stars - Montreal Children’s Hospital (2008)
- Médaille (medal) de l’Université du Québec À Montréal (UQAM) (2009)
- Léo-Pariseau Prize of the Association francophone pour le savoir (2010)
- "Prix Cercle d’Excellence” of the Université du Québec (2011)
- Canada Research Chair in Medicinal Chemistry (2004-2017)

== See also ==
- Glycopolymer
- Sialic acid
- N-Acetylneuraminic acid
- Thomsen-Friedenreich antigen
