= Paul Marmet =

Canadian physicist (1932–2005)

Paul Marmet OC FRSC

President of the Canadian Association of Physicists
- In office 1981–1982
- Preceded by: Cecil Costain
- Succeeded by: A.R. Crawford

Personal details
- Born: 20 May 1932 Lévis, Quebec, Canada
- Died: 20 May 2005 (aged 73) Ottawa, Ontario

Paul Marmet
- Education: Université Laval
- Known for: Low-energy Monoenergetic Electron Spectrometer
- Spouse: Jacqueline Marmet
- Children: Dr. Louis Marmet
- Awards: Officer, Order of Canada, 1981; Service Award, Royal Astronomical Society of Canada, 1977; Léo-Pariseau Prize of the French Canadian Association for the Advancement of Science (ACFAS), 1976; Herzberg Medal of the Canadian Association of Physicists, 1971
- Scientific career
- Fields: Physics
- Workplaces: Professor of Physics, Université Laval; Director, Laboratory for Atomic and Molecular Physics, Université Laval; Senior Researcher, Herzberg Institute of Astrophysics, National Research Council (Canada); Assistant Professor of Physics, University of Ottawa
- Academic advisors: Larkin Kerwin

Paul Marmet, OC FRSC (20 May 1932 – 20 May 2005) was a Canadian physicist, inventor, author, and professor at Laval University in Quebec City, Canada, who served as the President of the Canadian Association of Physicists.

Marmet is notable for developing a novel high-resolution electron velocity selector, a scientific instrument which became widely used by scientists around the world.

== Inventions ==
Early in his career, Marmet developed a high-resolution electron selector with his mentor Larkin Kerwin, a scientific instrument for studying ionic electronic states.

Along with a mass spectrometer Marmet developed, the novel instrument had an energy resolution superior to then-available instruments and has been used widely by scientists studying electron scattering, which led to the discovery of enhanced vibrational excitation in nitrogen and of Feshbach resonances.

== Research ==
Using the Marmet-Kerwin electron selector, Marmet and his research group discovered atomic and molecular states excited by electron impact but not by photons, such as doubly excited states that disobey spectroscopic selection rules. The group also found negative-ion resonances in which the incident electron temporarily attaches to the target atom or molecule.

== Career ==
After receiving his physics BSc in 1956 and DSc in 1960 from Laval University and entering the Physics faculty as an assistant professor at his alma mater school in 1961, Marmet became a full professor in 1967 at age 34.

Starting in 1967, he was director of the Laboratory for Atomic and Molecular Physics at Laval University, serving until 1982.

Between 1981 and 1982, Marmet served as President of the Canadian Association of Physicists.

From 1983 to 1990, he was a senior researcher at the Herzberg Institute of Astrophysics of the National Research Council Canada in Ottawa. While there, Marmet helped the University of Ottawa modernize its Physics education program.

In addition to the prominent role he played in developing the Canadian Space Program, Paul Marmet also served on the executive committee of the Atomic Energy Control Board of Canada (now the Canadian Nuclear Safety Commission).

== Opposition to quantum mechanics, relativity, and the Big Bang ==
In his later years, Marmet became an outspoken critic of the Copenhagen Interpretation of quantum mechanics, the theory of relativity, and the Big Bang cosmological model. He maintained a website devoted to his view.

Marmet was one of 34 signers of An Open Letter to the Scientific Community advocating against the Big Bang cosmology.

He also held an opposing view on cosmological redshift and advocated tired light cosmology.

== Activism ==
In addition to his activities as a member of the first Associate Committee on Astronomy of the National Research Council since 1971 and his playing a crucial role in negotiations for the Canada-France-Hawaii Telescope, Marmet was also promoting the development of Quebec's first astronomical research telescope.

== Bibliography ==
- Absurdities in Modern Physics – book (free eBook)
- Einstein's theory of relativity versus classical mechanics - book

== Honours ==
- Member of the Order of Canada (CO), 1981
- Service Award, Royal Astronomical Society of Canada, 1977
- Léo-Pariseau Prize of the French Canadian Association for the Advancement of Science (ACFAS), 1976
- Herzberg Medal of the Canadian Association of Physicists, 1971

Professional and academic associations
Preceded by Cecil Costain	President of the Canadian Association of Physicists; 1981–1982	Succeeded by A.R. Crawford
