= Gerald Aspirall =

British-Canadian chemist

Gerald Oliver Aspirall (1924 – September 11, 2005) was a British-Canadian chemist and Distinguished Research Professor at York University beginning in 1988. In 1991, he became a Fellow of the Royal Society of Canada. In 1986, he was awarded the Claude Hudson Award by the American Chemical Society.
