= Claude Hudson =

American chemist

Claude Silbert Hudson (January 26, 1881 – December 27, 1952) was an American chemist who is best known for his work in the area of carbohydrate chemistry. He is also the namesake of the Claude S. Hudson Award in Carbohydrate Chemistry given by the American Chemical Society.

== Life and work ==
Hudson was born in Atlanta, Georgia in 1881. Originally planning to become a minister, he enrolled in Princeton University, but soon his interests changed to science. He graduated from Princeton in 1901 with a bachelor's degree, and earned a Master of Science degree in 1902. He then went to Europe to study under Walther Nernst and Jacobus Henricus van 't Hoff. On returning to the United States, Hudson worked as a physics instructor for a year at Princeton University and later at the University of Illinois, earning a Ph.D. in 1907. He later held positions at the National Bureau of Standards and the NIH (1928 – 1951), both in Washington, DC.

In 1904 he observed that the phase diagram of nicotine-water solution has a closed curve. This is the first closed-loop coexistence curve, and a common example of reentrant phase.

He was elected to the National Academy of Sciences in 1927.

Hudson is also remembered for the so-called Hudson's rules, concerning the optical rotation of sugars.

He was awarded the Elliott Cresson Medal in 1942 and the Willard Gibbs Award in 1929.

== Selected early writings ==
- Hudson, C. S. (1903). "Uber die Multirotation des Milchzuckers (On the Mutarotation of Milk Sugar)". Z. Phys. Chem. 44: 487–494. doi:10.1515/zpch-1903-4421. S2CID 92962732.
- Hudson, C. S. (1904). "Die gegenseitige Loslichkeit von Nikotin in Wasser (The Reversible Solubility of Nicotine in Water)". Z. Phys. Chem. 47: 113–115. doi:10.1515/zpch-1904-4708. hdl:2027/uiuo.ark:/13960/t1kh8276d. S2CID 99438914.
- Hudson, C. S. (1904). "The Hydration of Milk Sugar in Solution". Z. Phys. Chem. 50: 273–290.
- Hudson, C. S. (1904). "The Hydration of Milk Sugar in Solution". J. Am. Chem. Soc. 26 (9): 1065–1082. doi:10.1021/ja01999a002.
- Hudson, C. S. (1905). "Application of the Hypothesis of Dissolved Ice to the Freezing of Water and of Dilute Solutions". Phys. Rev. 21 (1): 16–26. Bibcode:1905PhRvI..21...16H. doi:10.1103/physrevseriesi.21.16. hdl:2027/njp.32101067017077.
- Hudson, C. S. (1906). "The Freezing of Pure Liquids and Solutions under Various Kinds of Positive and Negative Pressure and the Similarity between Osmotic and Negative Pressure". Phys. Rev. 22 (5): 257–264. Bibcode:1906PhRvI..22..257H. doi:10.1103/physrevseriesi.22.257. hdl:2027/uiug.30112068483871.
- Hudson, C. S. (1906). "Hydration in Solution". Phys. Rev. 23 (5): 370–381. Bibcode:1906PhRvI..23..370H. doi:10.1103/physrevseriesi.23.370.
- Hudson, C. S. (1907). "The Catalysis by Acids and Bases of the Mutarotation of Glucose". J. Am. Chem. Soc. 29 (11): 1571–1576. doi:10.1021/ja01965a004.

== Claude S. Hudson Award ==
The Claude S. Hudson Award in Carbohydrate Chemistry has been given since 1946 by the American Chemical Society. Awardees are listed below.

- 2009 Peter H. Seeberger
- 2007 Pierre Sinaÿ
- 2005 David R. Bundle
- 2003 Robert J. Linhardt
- 2001 Yuan-Chuan Lee
- 1999 Chi-Huey Wong
- 1997 Samuel J. Danishefsky
- 1995 Tomoya Ogawa
- 1994 Hans Vliegenthart
- 1993 Irwin J. Goldstein
- 1992 Akira Kobata
- 1991 Per J. Garegg
- 1990 Bertram O. Fraser-Reid
- 1989 Walter A. Szarek
- 1988 Leslie Hough
- 1987 Stephen J. Angyal
- 1986 Gerald O. Aspinall
- 1985 Hans Paulsen
- 1984 Laurens Anderson
- 1983 Bengt Lindberg
- 1982 Stephen Hanessian
- 1981 Clinton E. Ballou
- 1980 George A. Jeffrey
- 1979 Arthur S. Perlin
- 1978 Michael Heidelberger
- 1977 Jack J. Fox
- 1976 Sidney M. Cantor
- 1975 Hans H. Baer
- 1974 Wendell W. Binkley
- 1973 Roger W. Jeanloz
- 1972 Derek Horton
- 1971 Robert S. Tipson
- 1970 Norman F. Kennedy
- 1969 John K. Netherton Jones
- 1968 Hewitt G. Fletcher Jr.
- 1967 W. Z. Hassid
- 1966 Raymond U. Lemieux
- 1965 C. G. Caldwell
- 1964 Dexter French
- 1963 Nelson K. Richtmyer
- 1962 Fred Smith
- 1961 John C. Sowden
- 1960 Roy L. Whistler
- 1959 W. Ward Pigman
- 1958 Hermann O. L. Fischer
- 1957 Julian K. Dale
- 1956 James M. D. Brown
- 1955 Kenneth R. Brown
- 1954 Horace S. Isbell
- 1953 George P. Meade
- 1952 Melville L. Wolfrom
- 1951 William D. Horne
- 1950 William B. Newkirk
- 1949 Frederick W. Zerban
- 1947 Frederick J. Bates
- 1946 Claude S. Hudson
