= Barbara Frisken =

Canadian physicist and academic

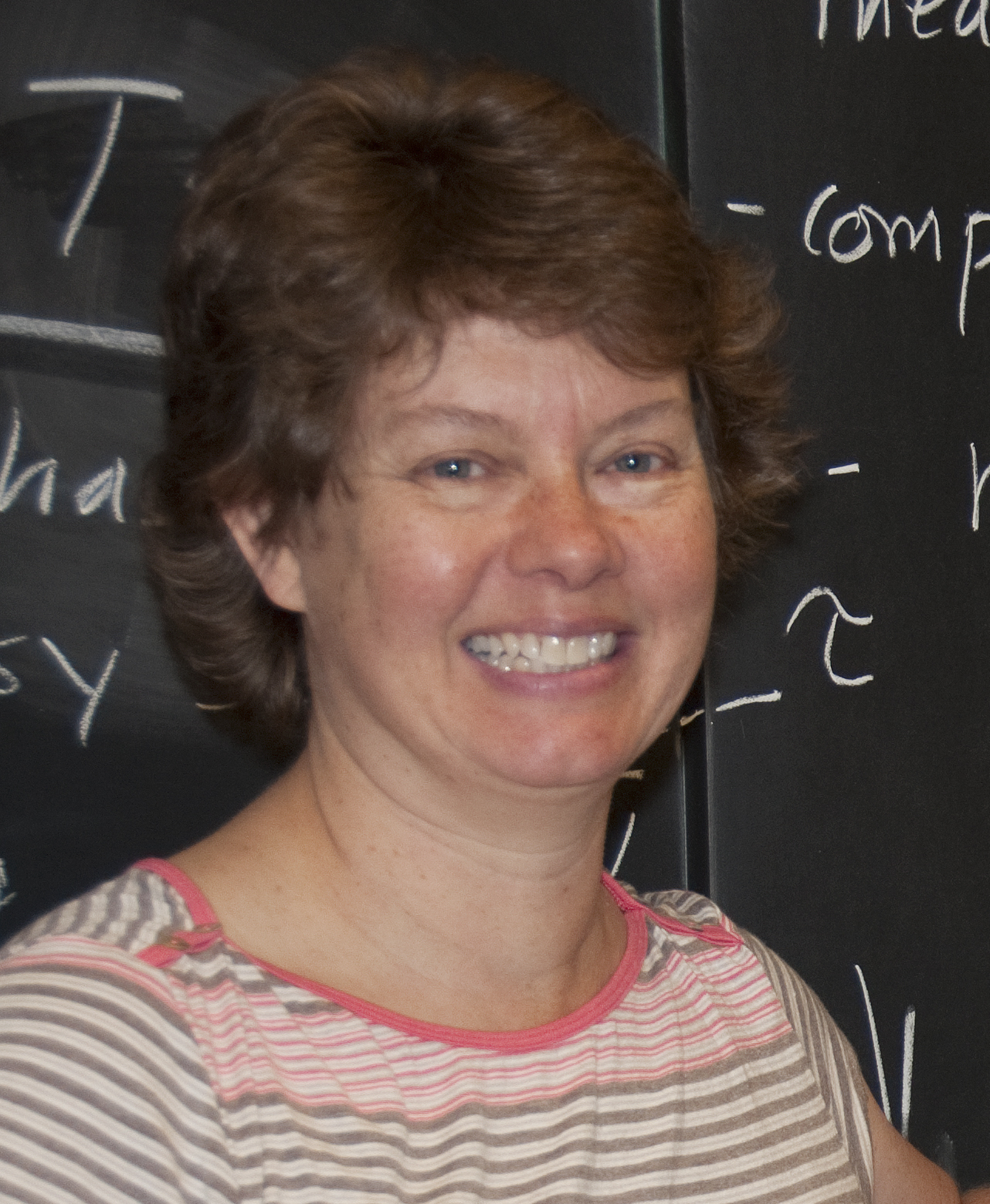
- Education: Queen's University at Kingston; Northwestern University; University of British Columbia; University of California, Santa Barbara
- Known for: Dynamic Light Scattering; President, Canadian Association of Physicists (2022)
- Scientific career
- Workplaces: Simon Fraser University
- Thesis: Nematic liquid crystals in electric and magnetic fields (1990)

Barbara Frisken a Canadian physicist who is a professor at the Simon Fraser University. Her research considers soft matter and the realisation of Polymer Electrolyte Membrane Fuel Cells. She was President of the Canadian Association of Physicists.

== Early life and education ==
Frisken is from Canada. Her father William Frisken, was a professor of Particle Physics at York University. She was an undergraduate student at Queen's University at Kingston, and moved to Northwestern University for a graduate degree. Frisken earned her doctorate at the University of British Columbia in 1990. Her doctoral research involved investigating the behaviour of nematic liquid crystals in electromagnetic fields. She moved to University of California, Santa Barbara, where she worked as a postdoctoral scholar.

== Research and career ==
Frisken joined the faculty of Simon Fraser University in 1992, where she studies soft matter, and looks to uncover structure-property relationships in molecular systems. Frisken has studied gels, polymers and colloidal materials. She developed dynamic light scattering, a technique used to characterise the size of nanoparticles.

Frisken worked on novel polymeric materials for using in Polymer Electrolyte Membrane Fuel Cells. High conductivity in polymeric materials is related to the morphology and nanostructure. These materials can be designed to conduct anions or protons. Frisken has shown that continuity of the hydrophilic regions is critical to improving conductivity, whilst the hydrophobic regions contain the membrane size. Her research combines characterisation techniques such as small-angle X-ray scattering and neutron scattering with molecular dynamics simulations to understand and optimise polymeric materials.

In 2012, Chris Hadfield took some of Frisken's materials to the International Space Station to study crystallisation dynamics in space.

== Academic service ==
In 2006, Frisken was made Chair of the Department of Physics at Simon Fraser University. She revamped undergraduate teaching, and continues to serve on their curriculum committee. She has held various positions in the Canadian Association of Physicists, including overseeing their Condensed Matter Physics division, the committee to Encourage Women in Physics and Committee on Academic Affairs. She was elected vice president in 2021, and President in 2022.

== Selected publications ==
- Frisken, B J (2001). "Revisiting the method of cumulants for the analysis of dynamic light-scattering data". Applied Optics. 40 (24): 4087–91. Bibcode:2001ApOpt..40.4087F. doi:10.1364/ao.40.004087. PMID 18360445. Wikidata Q28273728.
- Sophie Pautot; Barbara J Frisken; D A Weitz (2003). "Engineering asymmetric vesicles". Proceedings of the National Academy of Sciences of the United States of America. 100 (19): 10718–10721. Bibcode:2003PNAS..10010718P. doi:10.1073/pnas.1931005100. PMC 196870. PMID 12963816. Wikidata Q35977706.
