= Robert J. Linhardt =

American bioengineer

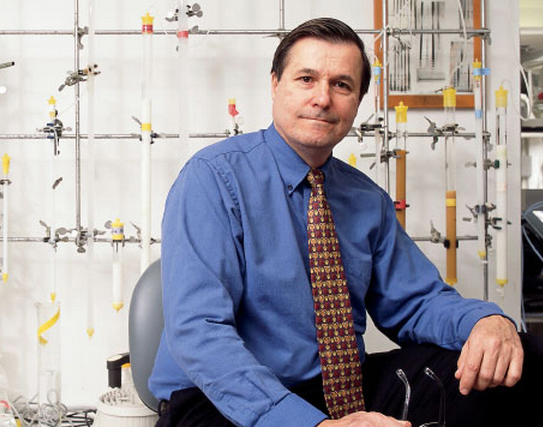
- Linhardt in his RPI lab in 2011
- Education: MIT; Johns Hopkins University; Marquette University
- Awards: Scientific American 10; American Chemical Society Melville L. Wolfrom Award; American Chemical Society Claude S. Hudson Award; American Chemical Society Horace S. Isbell; AAAS Fellow
- Scientific career
- Fields: Bioengineering; Metabolic Engineering; Biomolecular Interaction; The Interactome; Carbohydrate Analysis; Structural Biology; Glycobiology; Glycomics; Synthetic Carbohydrate Chemistry; Nanobiotechnology; Nano/Micron-scale Devices
- Workplaces: Rensselaer Polytechnic Institute
- Academic advisors: Robert S. Langer; Brown L. Murr

Robert J. Linhardt is the Ann and John Broadbent, Jr. '59 Senior Constellation Professor Biocatalysis & Metabolic Engineering at Rensselaer Polytechnic Institute.

His primary appointment at RPI is based in the Center for Biotechnology and Interdisciplinary Studies, consisting of joint appointments with the Department of Chemistry & Chemical Biology, Department of Biology, Department of Chemical and Biological Engineering, Department of Biomedical Engineering and the Rensselaer Nanotechnology Center. He is highly cited in his field, with over 100 papers having each over 100 citations.

Prior to joining RPI in 2003, he was then a professor for 21 years at the University of Iowa. During his career in Iowa, he spent eight years as the F. Wendell Miller Distinguished Professor of Chemistry and ten years as a member of the executive committee of the Center for Biocatalysis & Bioprocessing. Since 2008 Linhardt's group has been working on a collaboration to bioengineer Heparin from E. coli. This is in part a response to the outbreak of adverse heparin reactions in 2007. This work helped earn him a spot in the Scientific American 10, for the 10 people who “demonstrated outstanding commitment to assuring that the benefits of new technologies and knowledge will accrue to humanity.” He was the 2010 recipient of the Melville L. Wolfrom Award of the American Chemical Society.

Professor Robert Linhardt died at his NYC home on January 5, 2025.
