= Michael Steinitz =

Canadian physicist

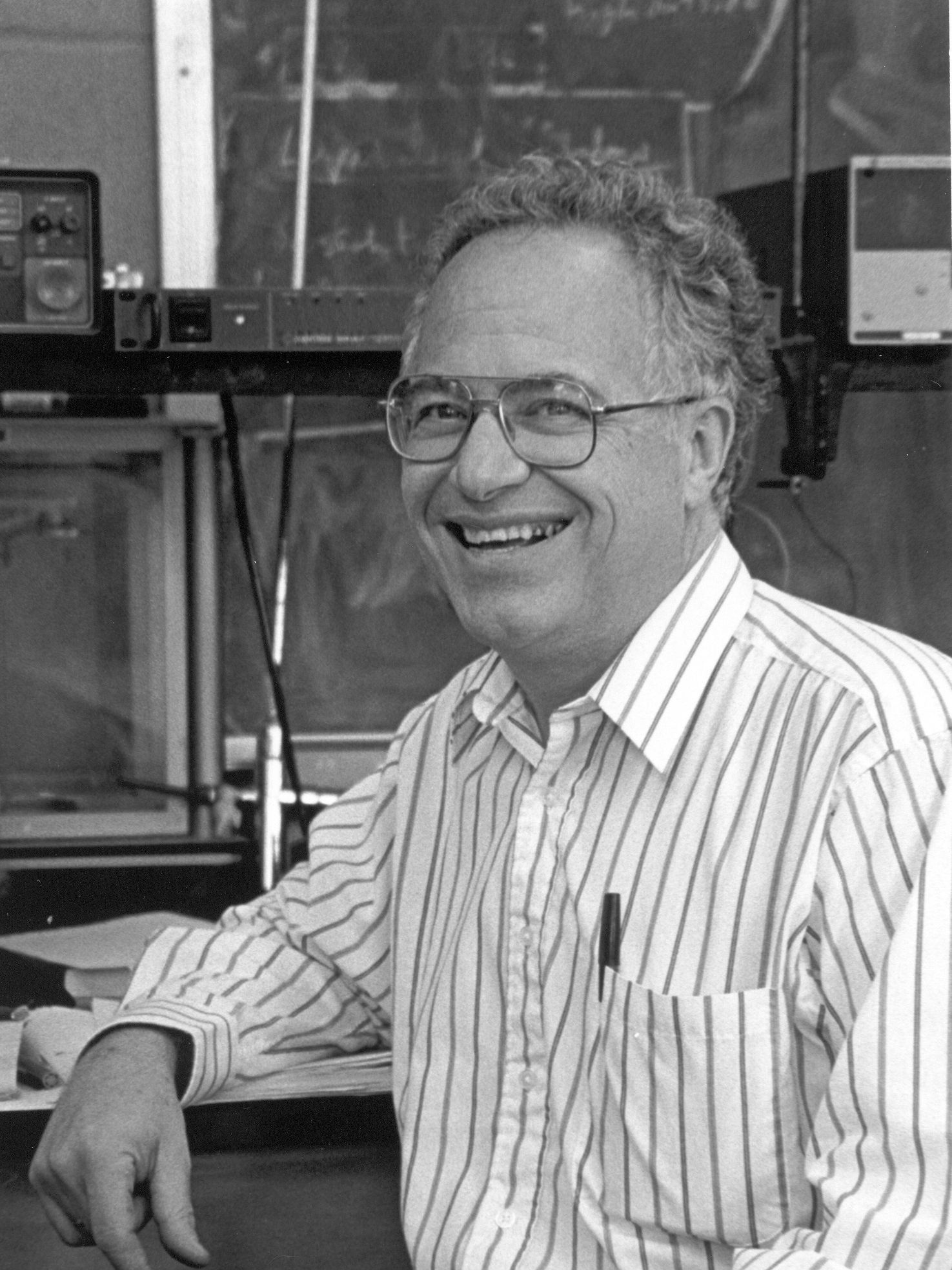
Michael Steinitz

Michael O. Steinitz is a professor emeritus of physics at St. Francis Xavier University. From 1998 to 1999, Steinitz was the president of the Canadian Association of Physicists. He spearheads the Antigonish Performing Arts Series for the town of Antigonish.
