= Albéric Boivin =

Canadian physicist and professor

Albéric Boivin

Albéric Boivin (February 11, 1919 in Baie-St-Paul, Quebec — August 8, 1991 in Quebec City) was a Canadian physicist known for his work in optics.

== Early life ==
Boivin began his studies at Université Laval in 1940; in 1944, he became one of the university's first four graduates in physics, and began teaching that year.

He subsequently earned his master's degree there in 1949, and became a full professor in 1955. He earned his doctorate in 1960.

== Professional achievements ==
Boivin's work in optics drew other researchers to him, and in the 1960s he established the Laboratoire d'Optique et Hyperfrequences, which subsequently became the Laboratoire de Recherches en Optique et Laser, and later the Centre d'Optique, Photonique et Laser; this has been cited as a "determining factor" in the Canadian government's decision to establish the Institut National d'Optique in Quebec City.

He also launched Université Laval's astrophysics program, and was a founding member of the Canadian Astronomical Society.

His students included Roger A. Lessard, and he collaborated with Emil Wolf on "a paper on the field structure about the focus of a wide-aperture aplanatic system".

== Recognition ==
Boivin was a Guggenheim Fellow in 1962, and won the 1967 Léo-Pariseau Prize. In 1969, he served as vice-president of the Canadian Association of Physicists.

In 1978, he was elected a Fellow of the Royal Society of Canada.
