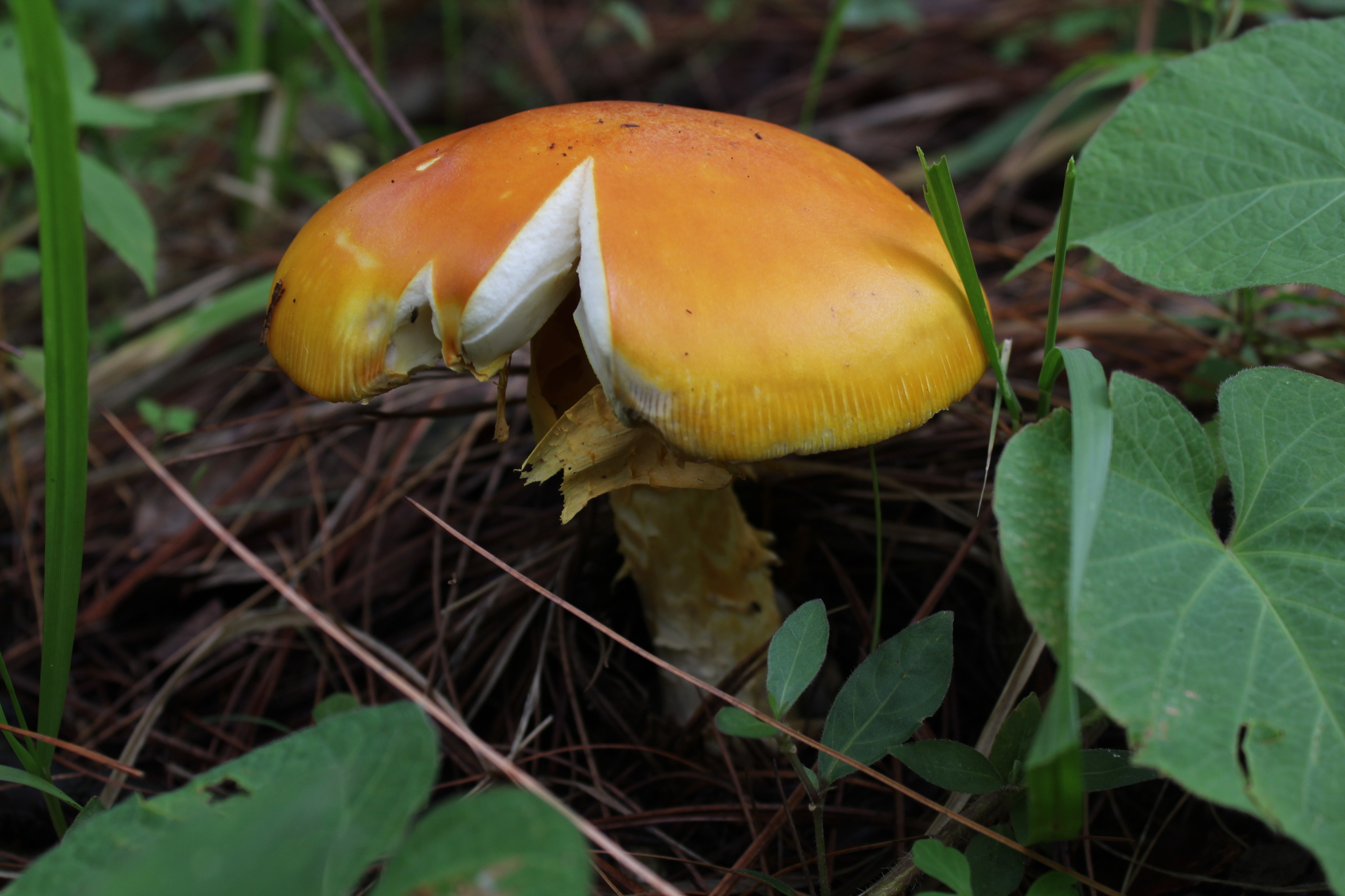

Scientific classification
- Kingdom: Fungi
- Division: Basidiomycota
- Class: Agaricomycetes
- Order: Agaricales
- Family: Amanitaceae
- Genus: Amanita
- Species: A. basii

Binomial name
- Amanita basii Guzmán & Ram.-Guill.

= Amanita basii =

Species of fungus

Amanita basii
- Mycological characteristics
- Gills on hymenium
- Cap is umbonate
- Hymenium is free
- Stipe has a volva
- Spore print is white
- Ecology is mycorrhizal
- Edibility is choice but not recommended

Amanita basii is a species of fungus in the family Amanitaceae.

== Description ==
Its cap is at around 67–152 millimetres (2 1/2–6 inches) wide, with a brown reddish color to "cadmium orange" becoming very intense red, "lake red" or brownish red in the center part of the cap, which is somewhat faded by the sun, in spots it's red-orange, orange-yellow to deep orange at the margin, yellow at the margin in maturity. The volva seen in the mushroom is absent in maturity or is present when young as small white patches. Its flesh has a color ranging from butter yellow to yellowish under the cap skin, yellow in the center part and near the margin, from pale yellowish white to white elsewhere, the flesh is around 9–13 mm (1/4–1/2 in) thick above the stem, and it thins evenly to the margin. The gills are free, subcrowded, thickest close to the margin, and are around 9–12 mm broad.

The stem is 124–137 mm (5–5 1/2 in) × 16–23 mm with a pale yellowish to orange color in the upper part of the stem with light yellow as the ground color. The ring is attached in the upper part, subapical, skirt-like, copious, membranous, persistent, orange-yellow at first, becoming yellow-orange. The saccate volva is smooth, white, with yellow tints on the inner surface, dry, membranous, firmly attached to the stem. The flesh is white, staining light yellow, and stuffed with moderately dense material.

Its stem is around 12.4–13.7 cm × 1.6–2.3 cm, with a pale yellow to orange color in the upper part of the mushroom's stem with a light yellow on the ground, becoming brown to blackish with handling, stuffed, subcylindric to cylindrical, with irregular ragged patches and strands of orange-yellow felted to membranous material on the outer surface; the stem decoration becomes more intensely orange when handled. The ring is attached in the upper part, subapical, skirt-like, copious, membranous, persistent, orange-yellow at first, becoming yellow-orange. The saccate volva is smooth, white, with yellowish tints on the inner surface, dry, membranous, firmly attached to the stem. The flesh is white, staining light yellow, and stuffed with moderately dense material.

The spores measure around approximately 9.0–11.8 (8.0–18.0) × 6.1–7.5(5.5–9.0) μm and are broadly ellipsoid to elongate (rarely cylindric) and inamyloid. Clamps are common at bases of basidia.

=== Similar species ===
Not to be confused with Amanita laurae, which grows under oaks, A. yema (under firs) and A. jacksonii, which grows in cloud forest.

== Distribution and habitat ==
It occurs in pine forests in Mexico.

== Uses ==
Though not as well known as other edible mushroom species, A. basii is considered to be edible and has a sweet taste. The odor is somewhat pleasantly fungoid.

In Guatemala, Amanita basii is commonly sold in markets, along with other mushrooms, usually from the Russulaceae family, which includes Russulas & milkcaps, usually near the areas of the border with Mexico. This caesar mushroom is also common culinarily in Mexico, in areas where Huitlacoche are also commonly consumed.

== See also ==
- Amanita
- List of Amanita Species
