= Bernard Bernier =

Canadian anthropologist

- Citizenship: Canadian
- Education: Cornell University
- Scientific career
- Fields: Anthropology
- Workplaces: Université de Montréal
- Doctoral advisor: Robert J. Smith

Bernard Bernier (born 1942) is a Canadian anthropologist and Professor at the Université de Montréal, where he has been working since January 1970. His main topics of research are Japanese political economy, theories of social change, nationalism and social inequalities, and Watsuji Tetsurô's philosophy. Part of Bernier's work is devoted to debunking false ideas and clichés about Japan, such as the stereotype of a harmonious and homogeneous society.

== Biography ==
A native of Quebec, Bernard Bernier was an undergraduate student at Laval University from 1962 to 1964 and a Master's student at the University of British Columbia in 1964-65. He then moved to Cornell University, where he studied under the supervision of Robert J. Smith and received his PhD in anthropology in 1970. His doctoral dissertation focused on popular religion in a Japanese village.

== Work ==
Throughout his career, Bernard Bernier has been Directeur d'études associé at the School for Advanced Studies in the Social Sciences in 1983-84, interim Chair of the East Asian program at the Université de Montréal in 1984-85, and Chair of the Anthropology Department at the same university in 1998-2002 and 2010-14. He was also a member of the redaction committee of Anthropologie et Sociétés from 1997 to 2000. He is one of only two anthropologists who have received the Prix Marcel-Vincent (now Prix Acfas Thérèse Gouin-Décarie), awarded by the Association francophone pour le savoir to honor his major and long-standing contribution to the social sciences.

== Selected works ==
Thesis

- "The Popular Religion of a Japanese Village and Its Transformation," Cornell University (PhD, Anthropology), 1970

Books

- Breaking the Cosmic Circle: Religion in a Japanese Village, 1975
- Capitalisme, société et culture au Japon: Aux origines de l'industrialisation (Capitalism, Society and Culture in Japan: The Origins of Industrialization), 1988
- Le Japon contemporain: Une économie nationale, une économie morale (Contemporary Japan: A National Economy, a Moral Economy), 1995
- Le Japon en transition (Japan in Transition), in association with Vincent Mirza, 2007
- Le Japon au travail (Japan at Work), in association with Vincent Mirza, 2009
- Japanese Youth in the Conservative Elite Society: Essays on the Liberal Young Super-Achievers, with Hiroshi Itoh, 2015

Book Chapters

- "L'économie et la société japonaise face à la crise monétaire de 1971" (Japanese Economy and Society in the Face of the 1971 Monetary Crisis), in Le Japon: Mythes et réalités, by Robert Garry (ed.), 1973
- "Classes sociales et idéologie raciste dans les colonies de peuplement" (Social Classes and Racist Ideology in Settler Colonies), in Frontières ethniques en devenir = Emerging Ethnic Boundaries, by Danielle Juteau Lee (ed.), 1979
- "Production, culture et idéologie: Approches marxistes," in Perspectives anthropologiques: Un collectif d'anthropologues québécois, 1979
- "Immigration et utilisation de la main-d'œuvre ethnique au Canada" (Immigration and Use of the Ethnic Labor Force in Canada), in Perspectives anthropologiques: Un collectif d'anthropologues québécois, 1979
- "Yanagita's "About Our Ancestors": Is It a Model for an Indigenous Social Science?," in International Perspectives on Yanagita Kunio and Japanese Folklore Studies, by J. Victor Koschmann et al. (eds.), 1985
- "Factory Automation in Japan: Context and Consequences," in Proceedings of the Modern Japan Conference, Edmonton, University of Alberta, 1987
- "Le nationalisme contemporain au Japon" (Contemporary Nationalism in Japan), in Le Japon face à l'internationalisation: Perspectives économiques et socio-politiques pour les années 1990, by Bernard Bernier and Yukio Satow (eds.), 1988
- ""Fûdo" and "Jomôn": Some Japanese Intellectuals Define Japanese Culture" (with Michel Comtois), in Actes du colloque sur l'Asie de l'Est, 1992, by C. Comtois (ed.), 1995
- "Culture et contraintes institutionnelles: L'identification des ouvriers à leur entreprise au Japon" (Culture and Institutional Constraints: The Workers' Identification to Their Company in Japan), in Tradition et innovation en Chine et au Japon: Regards sur l'histoire intellectuelle, by Charles Le Blanc and Alain Rocher (eds.), 1996
- "De l'éthique au nationalisme et au totalitarisme chez Heidegger et Watsuji" (From Ethics to Nationalism and Totalitarianism in Heidegger and Watsuji), in Approches critiques de la pensée japonaise du XXe siècle, by Livia Monnet (ed), 2001
- "La transcendance dans la philosophie de Watsuji Tetsurô" (Transcendence in Watsuji Tetsurô's Philosophy), in Philosophes japonais contemporains, by Jacynthe Tremblay (ed.), 2010
- "Modernité et anti-modernité au Japon," in Modernité en transit = Modernity in Transit, by Richard Dubé et al. (eds.), 2010

Journal Articles

- ""Culture de la pauvreté" et analyse des classes" ("Culture of Poverty" and Class Analysis), Anthropologica, 16.1, 1974
- "Critique de la théorie libérale du développement" (A Critique of Liberal Development Theory) (with Rodolphe de Koninck), Revue Canadienne de Sociologie et d'Anthropologie, 11.2, 1974
- "The Penetration of Capitalism in Quebec agriculture," Canadian Review of Sociology, 13.4, 1976
- "La rente foncière et l'agriculture dans le capitalisme actuel" (The Land Tax and Agriculture in Contemporary Capitalism) (with Lise Bergeron and André Bouvette), Anthropologie et Sociétés, 1.2, 1977
- "Ethnicité et lutte des classes" (Ethnicity and Class Struggle) (with Michael Elbaz and Gilles Lavigne), Anthropologie et Sociétés, 2.1, 1978
- "Les phénomènes urbains dans le capitalisme actuel" (Urban Phenomena in Contemporary Capitalism), Cahiers de géographie du Québec, 22.56, 1978
- "Main-d'oeuvre féminine et ethnicité dans trois usines de vêtement de Montréal" (Women's Labor and Ethnicty in Three Garment Factories of Montreal), Anthropologie et Sociétés, 3.2, 1979
- "Le système d'emploi à vie au Japon: Réexamen et interprétation" (The Lifetime Employment System in Japan), Anthropologie et Sociétés, 3.3, 1979
- "The Japanese Peasantry and Economic Growth since the Land Reform of 1946-1947," Bulletin of Concerned Asian Scholars, 12.1, 1980
- "L'expansion de la ville capitaliste contre la campagne" (The Capitalist City's Expansion Against the Countryside), Anthropologie et Sociétés, 4.2, 1980
- "Religion et politique au Japon: Le culte de l'empereur" (Religion and Politics in Japan: The Imperial Cult), Anthropologie et Sociétés, 6.1, 1982
- "L'apparition du nationalisme en Occident: Les contextes historiques" (The Apparition of Nationalism in the West: Historical Contexts), Anthropologie et Sociétés, 7.2, 1983
- "L'automatisation des industries et le développement technologique au Japon: Propositions de recherche" (Industrial Automation and Technological Development in Japan: Research Propositions), Anthropologie et Sociétés, 10.1, 1986
- "Cohésion nationale et risques calculés: La politique industrielle du Japon depuis 1945" (National Cohesion and Calculated Risk: Japan's Industrial Policy Since 1945), Labour, Capital and Society/Travail, capital et société, 21.1, 1988
- "La transition au Japon: Le jeu des circonstances dans le passage au capitalisme" (The Role Played by Circumstances in Japan's Transition to Capitalism), Sociologie et Sociétés, 22.1, 1990
- "Révisionnisme, japonisme, culturalisme: Comment expliquer le succès économique japonais?" (Revisionism, Japonism, Culturalism: Explaining Japan's Economic Success), Anthropologie et Sociétés, 14.3, 1990
- "Le Japon, société sans classes?" (Japan, Classless Society?), Anthropologie et société, 18.1, 1994
- "La famille comme modèle/métaphore de l'entreprise au Japon: Les rapports historiques de la culture, de l'idéologie et des formes institutionnelles" (The Family as a Model/Metaphor of the Enterprise in Japan), L'ethnographie, 80.115, 1994
- "Watsuji Tetsurô, la modernité et la culture japonaise" (Watsuji Tetsurô, Modernity and Japanese Culture), Anthropologie et Sociétés, 22.3, 1998
- "Flexibility, Rigidity and Reactions to Globalization of the Japanese Labour Regime," Labour, Capital and Society/Travail, capital et société, 33.1, 2000
- "La crise économique japonaise et la mondialisation" (The Japanese Economic Crisis and Globalization), Labour, Capital and Society/Travail, capital et société, 35.1, 2002
- "Les classes sociales et le Japon: Idéologie de la communauté nationale et inégalités sociales" (Social Classes and Japan: National Community Ideology and Social Inequalities), Lien Social et Politiques, 49, 2003
- "Techniques industrielles, le Japon et l'utilisation des capacités humaines" (Industrial Techniques, Japan and the Utilization of Human Capacities), Anthropologie et Sociétés, 28.1, 2004
- "National Communion: Watsuji Tetsuro's Conception of Ethics, Power, and the Japanese Imperial State," Philosophy East and West, 56.1, 2006
- "L'expansion du travail précaire" (The Expansion of Precarious Work), Anthropologie et Sociétés, 33.1, 2009
- "L'agriculture biologique au Japon" (Biological Agriculture in Japan), Anthropologie et Sociétés, 34.1, 2010
- "Économie réelle et symbolique, flux financiers et relation global-local: Crise du capitalisme et réorganisation des modes d'appropriation du surplus" (Real and Symbolic Economy, Financial Flows and Global-Local Relation), Anthropologie et Sociétés, 34.2, 2010
- "Unité et diversité de l'État moderne au Japon" (Unity and Diversity of the Modern State in Japan), Revue internationale de psychologie politique sociétale, 2.2, 2011
- "Dispossession and Changes in Class Relations in Japan Since 1980," Critique of Anthropology, 31.2, 2011
- "Déclassement et transformation de la structure de classes au Japon de 1945 à 2013" (Downward Mobility and the Class Structure's Transformation in Japan from 1945 to 2013), Diversité urbaine, 13.1, 2013

Book Reviews

- "North Koreans in Japan: Language, Ideology, and Identity, by Sonia Ryang," American Anthropologist, 99.4, 1997
- "Translation and Subjectivity: On "Japan" and Cultural Nationalism, by Naoki Sakai," Anthropologie et Sociétés, 22.3, 1998.

== Awards ==
- Bobbs-Merrill Award in Anthropology, 1966
- Canada-Japan Literary Prize, awarded by The Canada Council for the Arts for Capitalisme, société et culture au Japon: Aux origines de l'industrialisation, 1989
- Prix Marcel-Vincent (now Prix Acfas Thérèse Gouin-Décarie), awarded by the Association francophone pour le savoir (Acfas), 2010

== See also ==
- Social change
- Watsuji Tetsuro
- Nihonjinron
