= Michel Bouvier (scientist) =

Canadian biochemist and molecular pharmacologist

- Born: September 14, 1958 (age 67)
- Citizenship: Canadian
- Awards: Fellow of the Academy of Science of the Royal Society of Canada/ Fellow of the Canadian Academy of Health Sciences / Canada Research Chair in Signal Transduction and Molecular Pharmacology
- Scientific career
- Fields: Biochemistry and molecular pharmacology

Michel Bouvier OC CQ (born September 14, 1958) is a Canadian biochemist and molecular pharmacologist. He is a professor of biochemistry and molecular medicine at Université de Montréal; a principal investigator and the chief executive officer at the Institute for Research in Immunology and Cancer; and an associate vice-president in Research, Scientific Discovery, Creation, and Innovation at Université de Montréal. His work focuses on the study of cell signaling towards the discovery of new pharmaceutical drugs.

== Biography ==
Michel Bouvier earned a B.Sc. in biochemistry (1979) and a Ph.D. in neurological sciences (1985) from Université de Montréal, and then completed a postdoctoral fellowship (1985-1989) at Duke University under the supervision of Robert Lefkowitz (2012 Nobel Prize in Chemistry). Bouvier is a professor in the Department of Biochemistry and Molecular Medicine at the Faculty of Medicine of Université de Montréal and a principal investigator at the Institute for Research in Immunology and Cancer at Université de Montréal.

== Research ==
He is a world-known expert in cell signaling and drug discovery, notably in the field of G protein-coupled receptors (GPCRs), which constitute the largest single protein family involved in the transduction of hormonal signals and neurotransmitters. Their physiological significance makes them prime targets in drug development, and over a third of existing drugs use GPCRs as their target site of action. Bouvier's work in the regulation of receptors led to new paradigms (inverse agonism; pharmacological chaperones; receptor polymerization; and pluridimensionality of signaling), which, coupled with the development of bioluminescence resonance energy transfer-based methods, have a direct impact on drug discovery. He has authored over 260 scientific articles, filed 36 patent applications, and delivered over 400 lectures as a guest lecturer. Bouvier holds the Canada Research Chair in Signal Transduction and Molecular Pharmacology.

== Honours ==
- 2021 - Killam Prize in health sciences
- 2017 - Wilder-Penfield Prize
- 2017 - Julius Axelrod pharmacology prize of the American Society for Pharmacology and Experimental Therapeutics
- 2014 - Member of the Royal Society of Canada
- 2011 - Adrien-Pouliot Prize - Association francophone pour le savoir (Acfas)
- 2006 - Léo-Pariseau Prize (Acfas)
- 2005 - Fellow of the Canadian Academy of Health Sciences
- 2026 - Named an Officer of the Order of Canada.
