= René Roy =

René Roy may refer to:

- René Roy (economist)
- René Roy (chemist)
- René Roy (astronomer)
