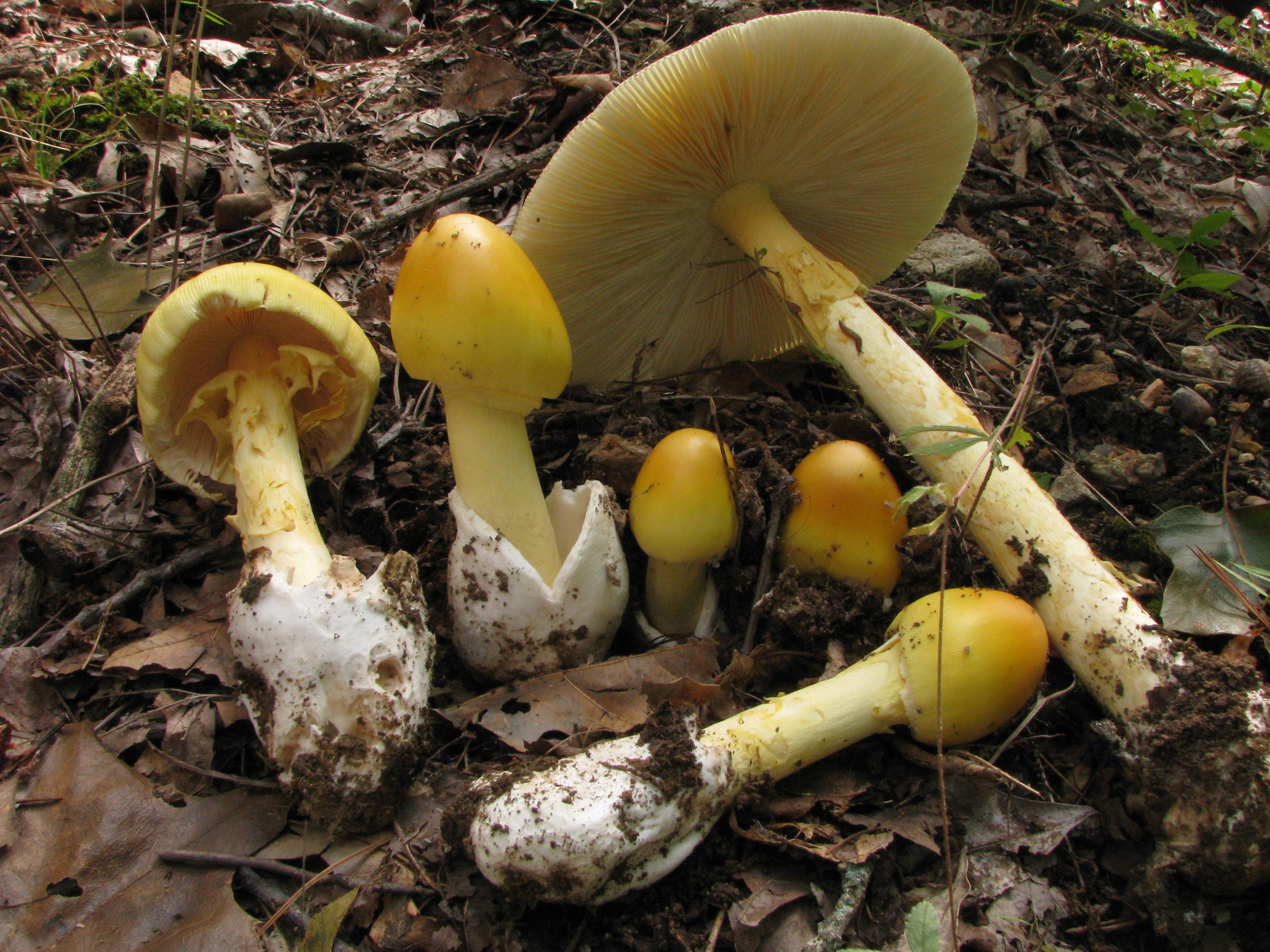

Scientific classification
- Kingdom: Fungi
- Division: Basidiomycota
- Class: Agaricomycetes
- Order: Agaricales
- Family: Amanitaceae
- Genus: Amanita
- Species: A. arkansana

Binomial name
- Amanita arkansana H. R. Rosen 1926

= Amanita arkansana =

Species of fungus

Amanita arkansana is a species of Amanita from South Eastern United States.

This is an edible mushroom species

Adults of the pleasing fungus beetle Tritoma biguttata affinis have been recorded from a supposed A.caesarea; this might be a misidentification of A.arkansana, and in any case it does not seem to be a regular food source for them.
