= Léo-Pariseau Prize =

Québécois prize

The Léo-Pariseau Prize is a Québécois prize which is awarded annually to a distinguished individual working in the field of biological or health sciences. The prize is awarded by the Association francophone pour le savoir (Acfas), and is named after Léo Pariseau, the first president of Acfas.

The award was inaugurated in 1944 and was the first Acfas prize. Prior to 1980 the prize was awarded to researchers in a large variety of disciplines, before being restricted to biological and health sciences. There are now ten annual prizes for researchers in different disciplines.

== Winners ==
Source: Acfas – Prix de la Recherche Scientifique de l'Acfas – Prix Léo-Pariseau

- 1944 - Marie-Victorin Kirouac, botany, Université de Montréal
- 1945 - Paul-Antoine Giguère, chemistry, Université Laval
- 1946 - Marius Barbeau, ethnology, Université Laval
- 1947 - Jacques Rousseau, botany and ethnology, Université de Montréal
- 1948 - Léo Marion, chemistry, University of Ottawa
- 1949 - Jean Bruchési, history and political science, Université de Montréal
- 1950 - Louis-Charles Simard, pathology, Université de Montréal
- 1951 - Cyrias Ouellet, chemistry, Université Laval
- 1952 - Louis-Paul Dugal, physiology, Université de Montréal
- 1953 - Guy Frégault, history, Université de Montréal
- 1954 - Pierre Demers. physics, Université de Montréal
- 1955 - René Pomerleau, mycology, Université de Montréal
- 1956 - Marcel Rioux, anthropology, Université de Montréal
- 1957 - No prize awarded.
- 1958 - Roger Gaudry, chemistry, Université de Montréal
- 1959 - Lionel Daviault, entomology
- 1960 - Marcel Trudel, history, Université Laval
- 1961 - Raymond Lemieux, chemistry, University of Alberta
- 1962 - Charles-Philippe Leblond, histology, McGill University
- 1963 - Lionel Groulx, history, Université de Montréal
- 1964 - Larkin Kerwin, physics, Université Laval
- 1965 - Pierre Dansereau, ecology, Université du Québec à Montréal
- 1966 - Noël Mailloux, psychology, Université de Montréal
- 1967 - Albéric Boivin, physics, Université Laval
- 1968 - Léonard-Francis Bélanger, histology, Université de Montréal
- 1969 - Fernand Dumont, sociology, Université Laval
- 1970 - Bernard Belleau, biochemistry, Bristol-Myers of Canada
- 1971 - Édouard Pagé, biology, Université de Montréal
- 1972 - Louis-Edmond Hamelin, geography, Université Laval
- 1973 - Camille Sandorfy, chemistry, Université de Montréal
- 1974 - Antoine D'Iorio, biochemistry, Université d'Ottawa
- 1975 - Pierre Angersphilosophy, Université de Montréal
- 1976 - Paul Marmet, physics, Université Laval
- 1977 - Jacques de Repentigny, microbiology and immunology, Université de Montréal
- 1978 - Vincent Lemieux, political science, Université Laval
- 1979 - Pierre Deslongchamps, chemistry, Université de Sherbrooke
- 1980 - André Barbeau, neurology, Institut de recherches cliniques de Montréal
- 1981 - Jean-G. Lafontaine, biology, Université Laval
- 1982 - J.-André Fortin, botany, Université Laval
- 1983 - Germain Brisson, nutrition, Université Laval
- 1984 - Wladimir A. Smirnoff, microbiology, Environment Canada
- 1985 - Louis Legendre, biology, Université Laval
- 1986 - Marc Cantin, medicine, Université de Montréal
- 1987 - Guy Lemieux, nephrology, Université de Montréal
- 1988 - Pierre Borgeat, physiology, Université Laval
- 1989 - Jules Hardy, neurosurgery, Université de Montréal
- 1990 - Jacques de Champlain, medicine, Université de Montréal
- 1991 - Jacques Leblanc, medicine, Université Laval
- 1992 - Paul Jolicoeur, molecular biology, Institut de recherches cliniques de Montréal
- 1993 - Albert J. Aguayo, neurology, McGill University
- 1994 - Emil Skamene, medicine, McGill University
- 1995 - André Parent, physiology, Université Laval
- 1996 - Domineco Regoli, pharmacology, Université de Sherbrooke
- 1997 - Rémi Quirion, neurosciences, McGill University
- 1998 - Serge Rossignol, neurosciences, Université de Montréal
- 1999 - Guy Armand Rouleau, neurology, McGill University
- 2000 - Rima Rozen, human genetics and pediatrics, McGill University
- 2001 - Nabil G. Seidah, biochemistry and molecular medicine, Institut de recherches cliniques de Montréal
- 2002 - Graham Bell. biology, McGill University
- 2003 - Mona Nemer, pharmacology, Université de Montréal
- 2004 - Jacques Montplaisir, sleep sciences, Université de Montréal
- 2005 - Laurent Descarries, pathology and cell biology, Université de Montréal
- 2006 - Michel Bouvier, biochemistry, Université de Montréal
- 2007 - André Veillette, immunology, Université de Montréal
- 2008 - Michael Kramer, pediatrics, Université McGill
- 2009 - Michel J. Tremblay, medical biology, Université Laval
- 2010 - René Roy, medicinal chemistry, Université du Québec à Montréal
- 2011 - Claude Perreault, immunology, Université de Montréal
- 2012 - Julien Doyon, neurosciences, Université de Montréal
- 2013 - Jean-Pierre Julien, neurodegeneration, Université Laval
- 2014 - Marc-André Sirard, animal reproduction, Université Laval
- 2015 - Guy Sauvageau, immunology and oncology, Université de Montréal
- 2016 - Gustavo Turecki, suicide and neurosciences, McGill University
- 2017 - Jacques Simard, genetics, Université Laval
- 2018 - Sylvain Moineau, microbiology, Université Laval
- 2019 - Sylvain Chemtob, neonatalogy and pharmacology, Université de Montréal

== See also ==
- List of biology awards
- List of medicine awards
