= Jules Hardy =

Canadian doctor and academic (1932–2022)

Jules Hardy OC CQ
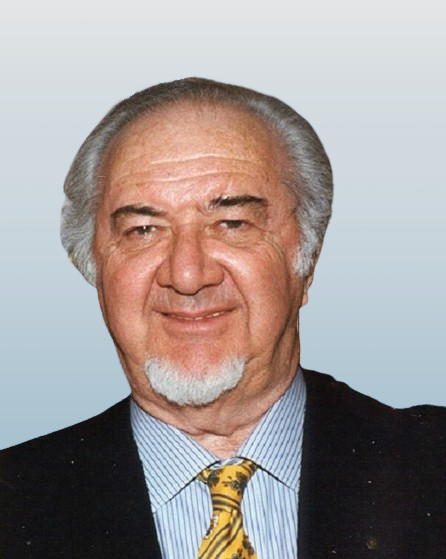
- Born: July 16, 1932; Sorel, Quebec, Canada
- Died: October 28, 2022 (aged 90)
- Education: Université de Montréal
- Scientific career
- Fields: Neuroscience; Neurosurgery
- Workplaces: Université de Montréal; Hôpital Notre-Dame; Hôtel-Dieu de Montréal

Jules Hardy OC CQ (July 16, 1932 – October 28, 2022) was a Canadian neurosurgeon.

== Early life and education ==
Born in Sorel, Quebec, on July 16, 1932, Hardy graduated as a doctor of medicine from the Université de Montréal in 1956, followed then by postgraduate work at the Université de Montréal as well as at McGill University. In 1962, he received a specialist certification in neurosurgery from the Quebec College of Physicians.

== Career ==
Hardy was a professor of neurosurgery at the Notre-Dame Hospital and the University of Montreal teaching centre. He was also the director of the Université de Montréal's neurosurgery program from 1979 to 1985. He authored over 140 papers and has contributed to several textbooks. He has also received a number of awards for his work in the field of pituitary surgery and has contributed in the fields of neurophysiology and neurosurgery.

== Death ==
Hardy died on October 28, 2022, at the age of 90.

== Honours ==
- 1974 – Received the order of merit for sciences and health from the government of Lebanon
- 1978 – Queen Elizabeth II Silver Jubilee Medal
- 1979 – Honorary doctorate from the University of Guadalajara in Mexico
- 1987 – Officer of the Order of Canada
- 1989 – Knight of the National Order of Quebec
- 1989 – Recipient of the Prix Léo-Pariseau
- 1989 – Recipient of the Prix Izaak-Walton-Killam
