= André Parent =

Canadian neurobiologist

André Parent, OC OQ FRSC (born October 3, 1944 ) is a Canadian researcher specializing in neurobiology, and Professor Emeritus at Université Laval.

Born in Montreal, he attended the Université de Montréal (BSc 1967) and subsequently earned a PhD in neuroanatomy from Université Laval in 1970. He undertook postdoctoral studies at the Max Planck Institute for Brain Research. In 1981, he became a professor at the department of anatomy at Laval University; and between 1985 and 1992, he was the scientific director of the research centre of the Hôpital de l'Enfant-Jésus and the director of the neurobiology laboratory at the faculty of medicine at the university. His research activity focusses on brain structures that are involved in motor control and often implicated in various neurodegenerative diseases.

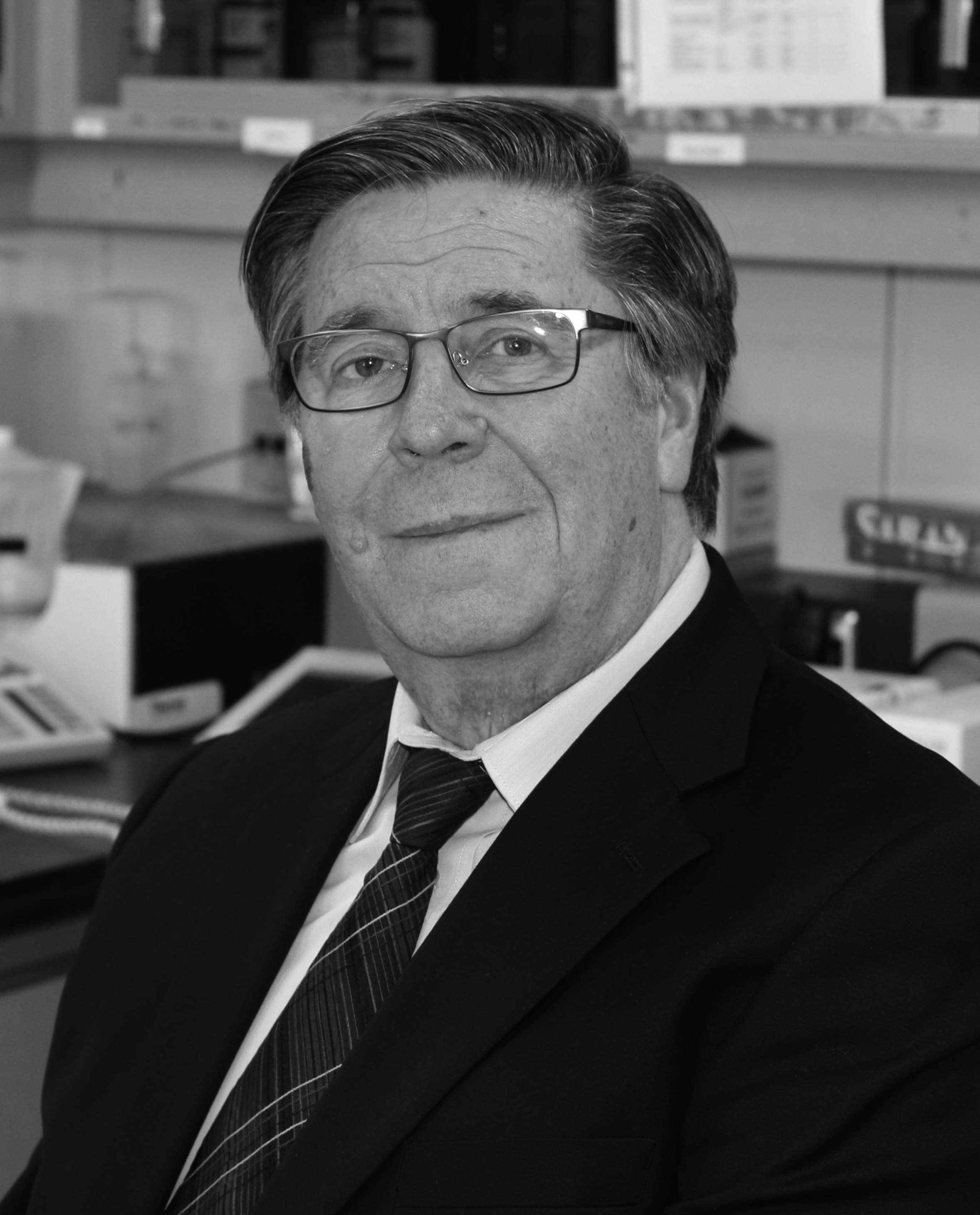
André Parent was a Canadian researcher

== Honours/Awards ==
- 1994 - Fellow of the Royal Society of Canada (section III: Academy of Sciences)
- 1995 - Léo-Pariseau Prize awarded by Acfas (Association francophone pour le savoir)
- 1997 - Killam Fellowship awarded by the Canada Council for the Arts
- 1996 - J.C.B. Grant Prize awarded by the Canadian Federation of Biological Societies
- 2001 - Jerry Friedman Prize awarded by the Parkinson Society of Canada
- 2002 - Wilder-Penfield Prize awarded by the Quebec Government
- 2008 - Fellow of the Canadian Academy of Health Sciences
- 2016 - Officer of the National Order of Quebec
- 2017 - "Grands diplômés (Gloire de l'Escolle)" Medal awarded by the Université Laval
- 2017 - Officer of the Order of Canada
- 2018 - Fellow of the American Association of Anatomists
