= Laurens Anderson =

American biochemist (1920–2018)

Laurens Anderson (May 19, 1920 – November 6, 2018) was an American biochemist.

== Early life and education ==
He was born on May 19, 1920, in South Dakota, to parents Adolf and Mary E. (Slaughter) Anderson. The family later moved to northeast Wyoming. Anderson's father died when he was eight, and he was later sent to live with an aunt in Belle Fourche, South Dakota, where he attended high school. Upon graduating at the age of fifteen, Anderson enrolled in normal school and taught for two years before enrolling at the University of Wyoming, where he joined the Reserve Officers' Training Corps. Anderson earned his bachelor's degree in 1942 and served in the United States Army Air Forces between January 1943 and August 1945.

== Career in biochemistry ==
Anderson returned to school in 1946, completing his doctorate in biochemistry at the University of Wisconsin–Madison in 1950. Anderson's postdoctoral research took place overseas, in Zürich, Switzerland. He began teaching at his alma mater in 1951, and was appointed Steenbock Professor of Biomolecular Structure in 1981. Anderson held the professorship until retirement in October 1986, when he was granted emeritus status. Over the course of his career, Anderson won the Claude S. Hudson Award (1984), and served as editor of the journal Carbohydrate Research.

== Death ==
He died on November 6, 2018, aged 98.
