= René Pomerleau =

Canadian biologist and mycologist (1904–1993)

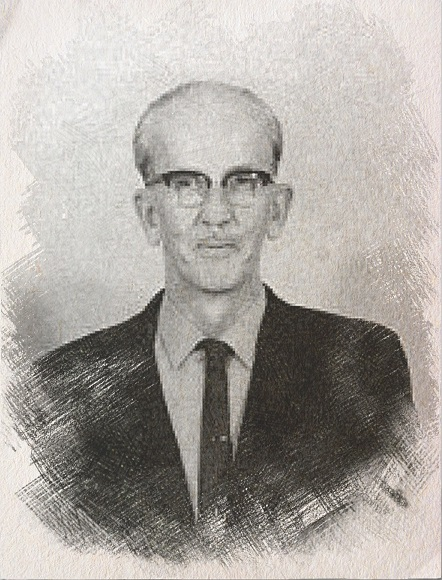
René Pomerleau

René Pomerleau, OC (27 April 1904 in Saint-Ferdinand, Quebec – 11 October 1993 in Quebec City) was a mycologist and plant pathologist whose specialty was fungi and lichens. He received a Bachelor of Agricultural Science from Laval University before an MS at the McGill University and later study at the Sorbonne. In 1972, he was awarded an honorary doctorate from Sir George Williams University, which later became Concordia University. He has been called the "Father of mycology in Canada" and seen as a pioneering plant pathologist. The film La mycolade also had him as the main character.

In 2016, following a major legacy gift, the Acfas created the René-Pomerleau Fund, dedicated to initiatives from the next generation of scientists.

== Awards ==
- 1955 Léo-Pariseau Prize
- 1981 Prix Marie-Victorin
