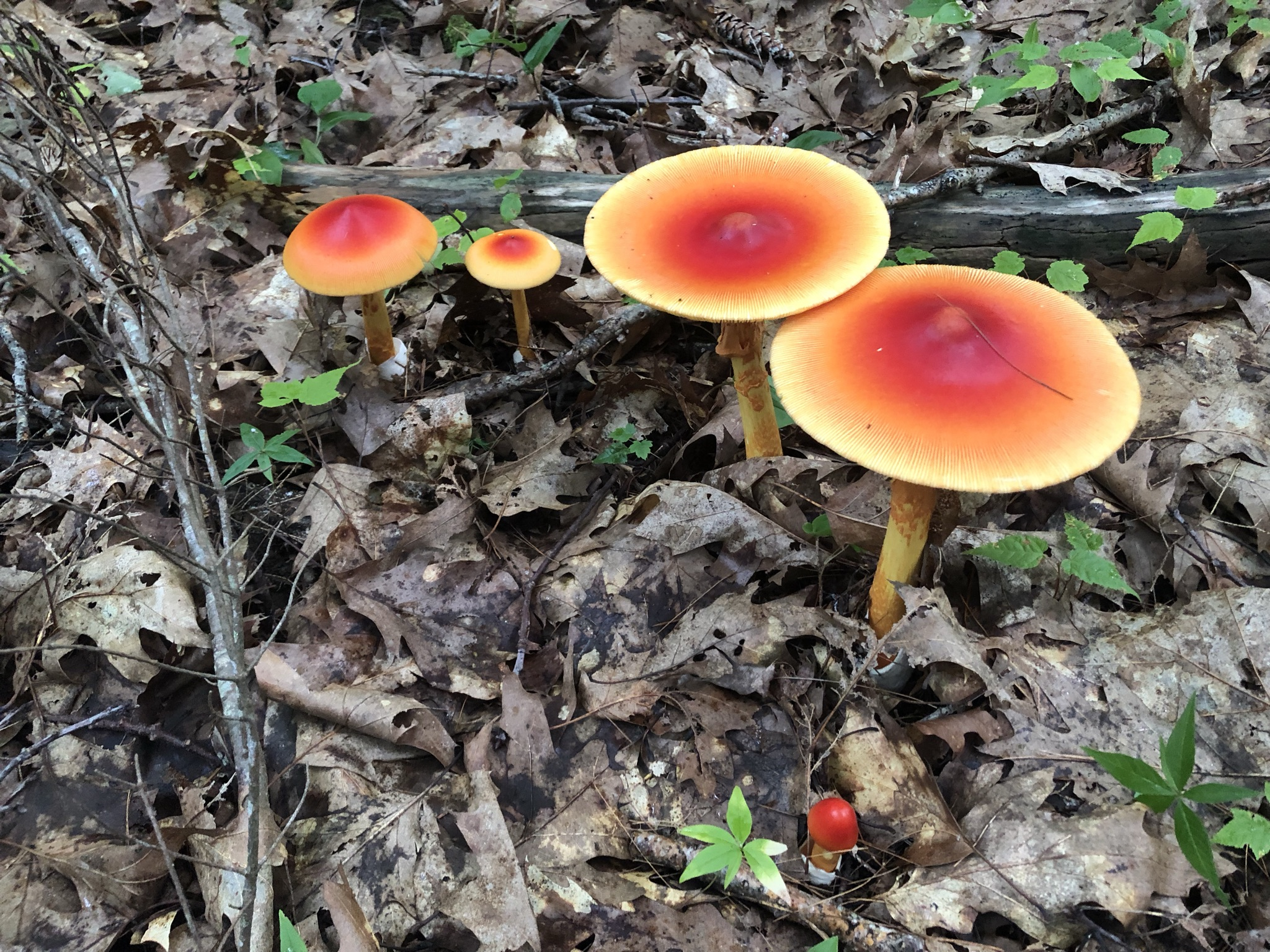
- Maine specimen in July

Scientific classification
- Kingdom: Fungi
- Division: Basidiomycota
- Class: Agaricomycetes
- Order: Agaricales
- Family: Amanitaceae
- Genus: Amanita
- Species: A. jacksonii

Binomial name
- Amanita jacksonii Pomerl.

Synonyms
- Amanita umbonata Pomerl. Amanita tullossii Guzmán & Ramírez-Guillén

= Amanita jacksonii =

Species of fungus

Amanita jacksonii
- Mycological characteristics
- Gills on hymenium
- Cap is convex
- Hymenium is free
- Stipe has a ring and volva
- Spore print is white
- Ecology is mycorrhizal
- Edibility is choice but not recommended

Amanita jacksonii, also known as Jackson's slender amanita, American slender Caesar, and eastern Caesar's amanita, is a North American species of fungus in the family Amanitaceae. It is a reddish-orange colored mushroom species which can be identified by its yellow gills, large, white, sacklike volva.

== History ==
It was given its current name in 1984 by Canadian mycologist René Pomerleau. The species was named in honor of Canadian watercolorist and mycological illustrator Henry A. C. Jackson. Both Pomerleau and Jackson were primarily active in Quebec, and first described the species from specimens found in that province.

== Description ==
The cap of the mushroom is 8–12 centimetres (3–4 1/2 inches) wide; oval at first, becoming convex, typically with a central bump; sticky; brilliant red or orange, fading to yellow on the margin; typically without warts or patches; the margin lined for about 40–50% of the cap's radius. The red pigment fades from margin toward the center with age. The gills are moderately crowded to crowded, orange-yellow to yellow-orange to yellow. They are free from the stem or slightly attached to it; yellow to orange-yellow; crowded; not bruising. The short gills are subtruncate to truncate.

The stipe measures 90–140 by 9–16 millimetres (3 1/2 in–5 1/2 in × 1/4 in–3/4 in), is yellow and decorated with orange fibrils and patches that are the remnants of a felted extension of the limbus internus of the otherwise white volva. The spores measure (7.0-) 7.8–9.8 (-12.1) × (5.2-) 5.8–7.5 (-8.7) μm and are broadly ellipsoid to ellipsoid (rarely subglobose or elongate) and inamyloid. Clamps are common at bases of basidia. The flesh looks whitish to pale yellow and does not stain on exposure.

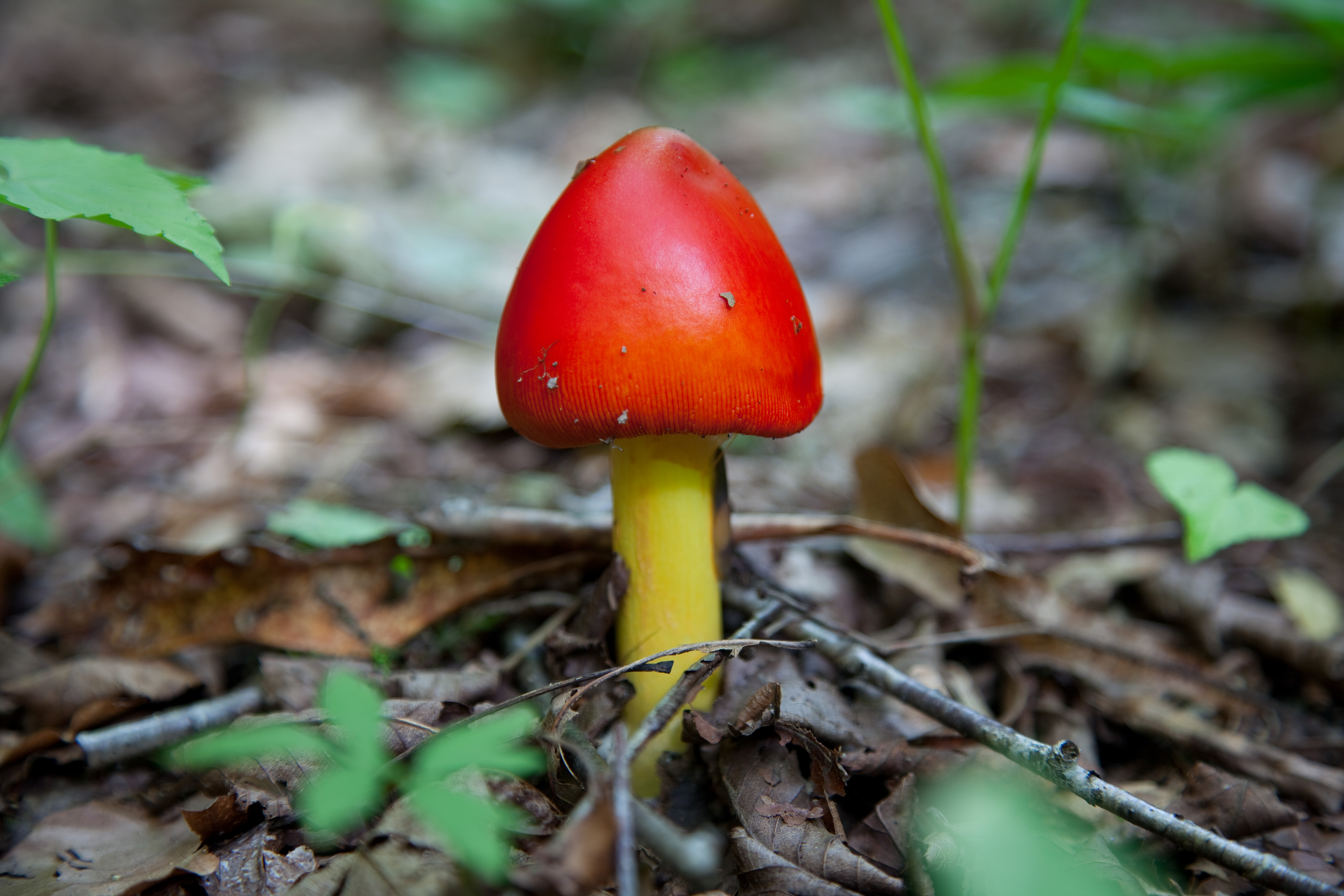
A newly emerged specimen

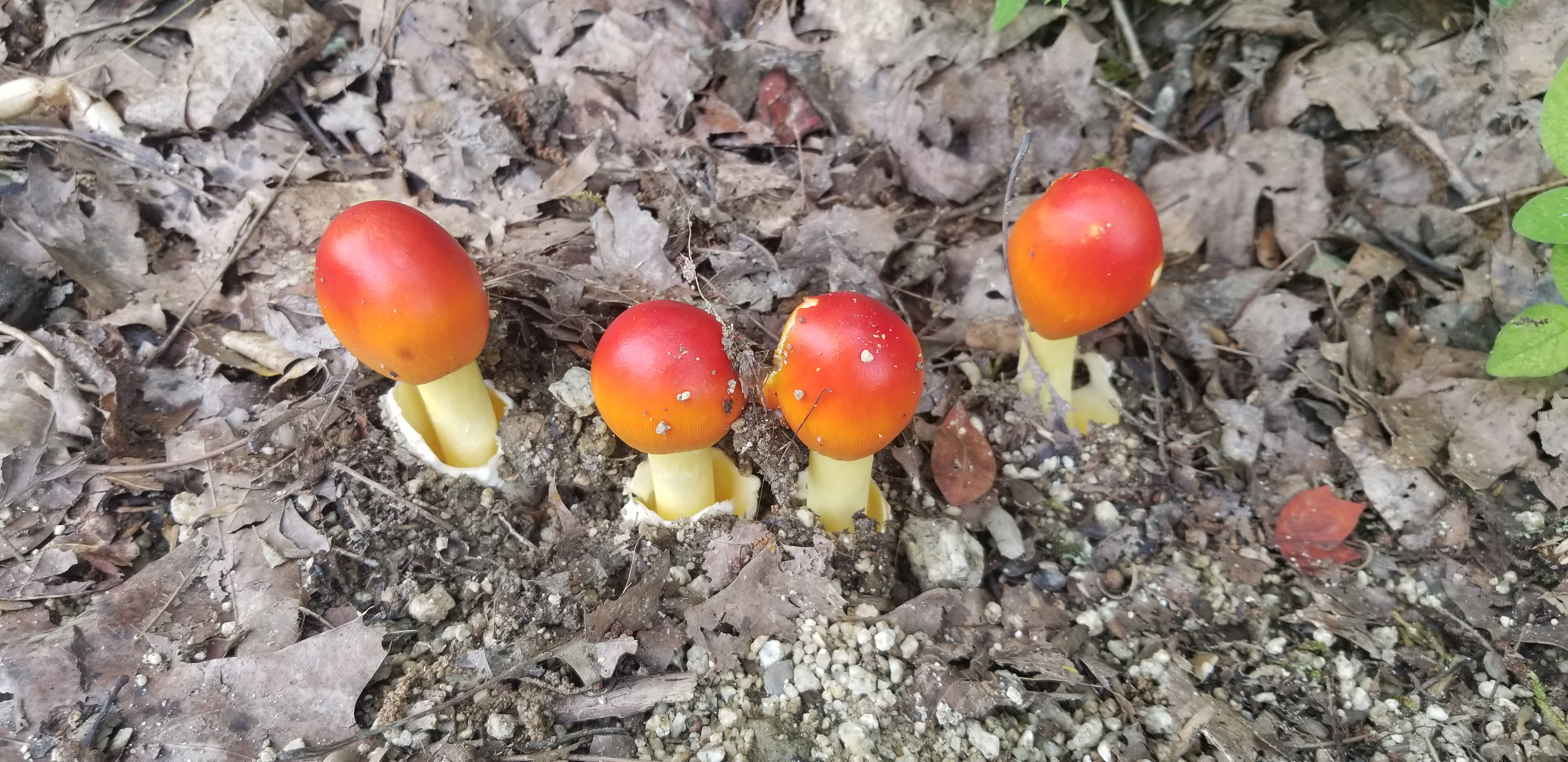
Specimens in North Carolina

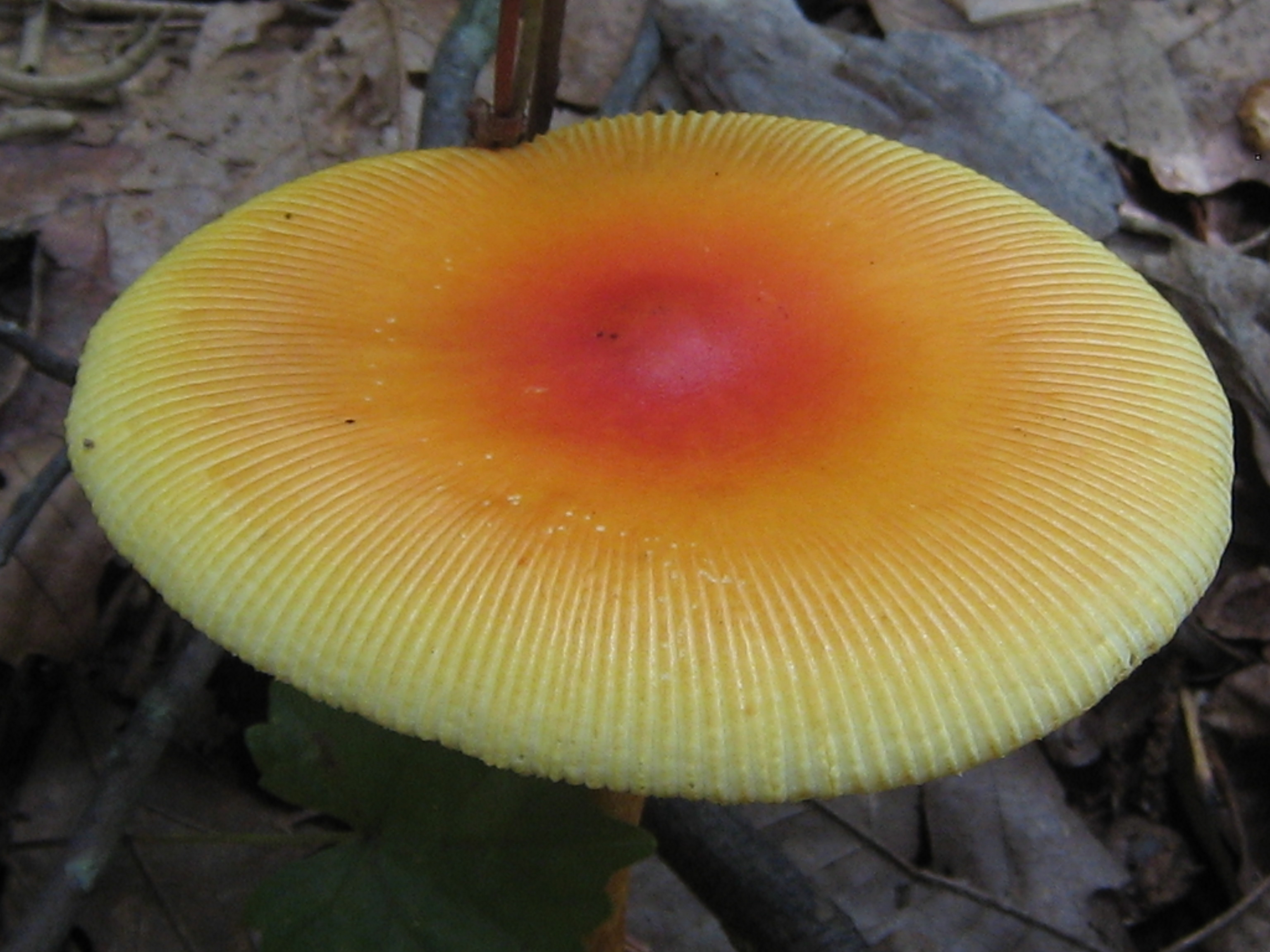
Striated cap margin

=== Similar species ===
A. jacksonii looks similar to A. caesarea (Caesar's mushroom), which is found in Europe and North Africa, as well as poisonous species of Amanita.

== Distribution and ecology ==
Its range extends from the Province of Quebec, Canada, to at least the State of Hidalgo, Mexico. It has been observed as far south as Cayo District, Belize.

Adults of the pleasing fungus beetle Tritoma biguttata affinis have been recorded from a supposed A.caesarea; this might be a misidentification of A.jacksonii, and in any case it does not seem to be a regular food source for them.

== Uses ==
The mushroom is considered a choice edible, although it can be confused with toxic species such as A. muscaria and A. phalloides.

== See also ==
- List of Amanita species
