= Rima Rozen =

Canadian geneticist

- Education: Yale University; McGill University
- Scientific career
- Workplaces: McGill University

Rima Rozen is a Canadian geneticist who is a professor at McGill University. Her current research focuses on genetic and nutritional deficiencies in folate metabolism and their impact on complex traits.

== Education ==
Rozen received her PhD from McGill University (Montreal, Canada) and completed postdoctoral training at McGill University and Yale University.

== Research career ==
Rozen became an assistant professor in the Human Genetics and Pediatrics Departments at McGill in 1984, and set up her research program on genetics and metabolic disease. In 1985, Rozen established the Molecular Genetics Diagnosis Service at the McGill-Montreal Children's Hospital, the first accredited molecular diagnosis service in Quebec, and continued to direct this service until 2002. In 1990, she became a Fellow of the Canadian College of Medical Geneticists, certified in molecular genetics. From 1999 to 2007, Rozen served as scientific director of the Montreal Children's Hospital and deputy scientific director of the McGill University Health Centre. She was also associate vice-principal (research and international relations) at McGill University from 2007 to 2013. During this time she continued to also work on her research interests.

Currently, Rozen is a James McGill Professor of Human Genetics and Pediatrics. In addition, she sits on the advisory board for the Institute of Genetics of the Canadian Institutes of Health Research (CIHR).

Rozen has published over 350 papers, which have been cited over 34,400 times, resulting in an h-index and i10-index of 76 and 199 respectively. She has received several awards for her research, including the Prix d'Excellence for pediatric research from the Inter-Service Clubs Council of Quebec, the Prix Léo-Pariseau from the association canadienne-francaise pour l'avancement des sciences, and the CIHR Senior Scientist Award. Rozen served as an expert panelist in the Council of Canadian Academies' Strengthening Canada's Research Capacity: The Gender Dimension report.

== Selected Academic Publications ==
- A candidate genetic risk factor for vascular disease: a common mutation in methylenetetrahydrofolate reductase. P Frosst, HJ Blom, R Milos, P Goyette, Christal A Sheppard, RG Matthews, GJH Boers, M Den Heijer, LAJ Kluijtmans, LP Van Den Heuve, and Rima Rozen. Nature Genetics. 1995.
- Relation between folate status, a common mutation in methylenetetrahydrofolate reductase, and plasma homocysteine concentrations. Paul F Jacques, Andrew G Bostom, Roger R Williams, R Curtis Ellison, John H Eckfeldt, Irwin H Rosenberg, Jacob Selhub, and Rima Rozen. Circulation. 1996.
- Oncogenic role of PDK4 in human colon cancer cells. D Leclerc, DNT Pham, N Lévesque, M Truongcao, WD Foulkes, C Sapienza, and R Rozen. British journal of cancer. 2017.
- High dietary folate in pregnant mice leads to pseudo-MTHFR deficiency and altered methyl metabolism, with embryonic growth delay and short-term memory impairment in offspring. Renata H Bahous, Nafisa M Jadavji, Liyuan Deng, Marta Cosín-Tomás, Jessica Lu, Olga Malysheva, Kit-Yi Leung, Ming-Kai Ho, Mercè Pallàs, Perla Kaliman, Nicholas DE Greene, Barry J Bedell, Marie A Caudill, and Rima Rozen. Human Molecular Genetics. 2017.
- R Rozen [HTML] from mdpi.com Moderate Folic Acid Supplementation in Pregnant Mice Results in Altered Sex-Specific Gene Expression in Brain of Young Mice and Embryos. Yan Luan, Marta Cosín-Tomás, Daniel Leclerc, Olga V Malysheva, Marie A Caudill, and Rima Rozen. Nutrients. 2022.
