= Pierre Sinaÿ =

French organic chemist

Pierre Sinaÿ, born on April 11, 1938, in Aulnay-sous-Bois (Seine-et-Oise), is a French organic chemist.

== Biography ==
After studying at the École nationale supérieure des industries chimiques de Nancy from 1958 to 1961, he obtained a doctorate under the supervision of Professor Serge David in 1966 and continued for two years at Harvard University in Massachusetts (United States) as a post-doctoral researcher with Professor Roger W. Jeanloz. He then entered the University of Orléans in 1969 as a professor, where he was Director of the Institute of Organic and Analytical Chemistry from 1978 to 1987. He then became Professor of Chemistry in 1986 at the Université Pierre-et-Marie-Curie, where he then headed the Laboratory of Selective Processes in Organic and Bioorganic Chemistry in the Department of Chemistry at the École normale supérieure. He then became Professor Emeritus at Sorbonne University in 2006 and joined the Paris Institute of Molecular Chemistry.

== Scientific work ==
Pierre Sinaÿ's scientific work focuses on the chemistry of carbohydrates and the understanding of the role of oligosaccharides in the living world. In the mid-1970s, Pierre Sinaÿ discovered and developed an effective method for oligosaccharide synthesis known as imidate glycosylation. This, by now allowing access to increasingly complex carbohydrate structures, is not unrelated to the development of glycobiology, the aim of which is to decode the meaning of this third alphabet of saccharides, which is in addition to that of proteins and nucleic acids. He synthesized the antigenic determinants of substances in human blood groups and then synthesized a complexly structured pentasaccharide representing the active site of heparin responsible for its antithrombotic effect. This last achievement demonstrates for the first time, without any ambiguity, the molecular basis of such an activity, commonly used in hospital medicine. This breakthrough in glyco-chemistry has led to the concept of conformational flexibility, which is crucial in heparinology. First materialized by the use of nuclear magnetic resonance, this concept was studied in detail using the chemical synthesis of constrained sugars adopting unconventional conformations. Pierre Sinaÿ has also discovered and developed a whole series of conceptually new reactions. Selective examples include the synthesis of spiroorthoesters by using selenium chemistry, the development of organometallic chemistry of anomeric carbon, the pioneering synthesis of C-disaccharides, electrochemical glycosylation and, more recently, a novel functionalization of cyclodextrins through a kind of molecular microsurgery in which aluminium derivatives are said to be the scalpel. For the first time, the existence of the glycosyl cation, an intermediate conventionally postulated during glycosylation reactions, could be formally demonstrated through chemistry in a superacid environment. A 4-volume book covers many aspects of carbohydrate chemistry and biology.

== Awards and honours ==
- Achille Le Bel Grand Prize of the French Chemical Society (1979)
- Pierre Desnuelle Prize from the French Academy of sciences (1996)
- Medal of the Berthelot Foundation (1996)
- Claude S. Hudson Award in Carbohydrate Chemistry from the American Chemical Society (2007)
- Elected Correspondent of the French Academy of sciences (1996)
- Honorary doctorate from the University of Lisbon (2005)
- Elected member of the French Academy of sciences (2003)
- Haworth Memorial Reading and Haworth Medal from the Royal Society of Chemistry (Great Britain, 2011).
- Associate Member of the National Academy of Pharmacy (2016).
- Chevalier of the Légion d'honneur and Commandeur of the Palmes Académiques.
