= Stephen Hanessian =

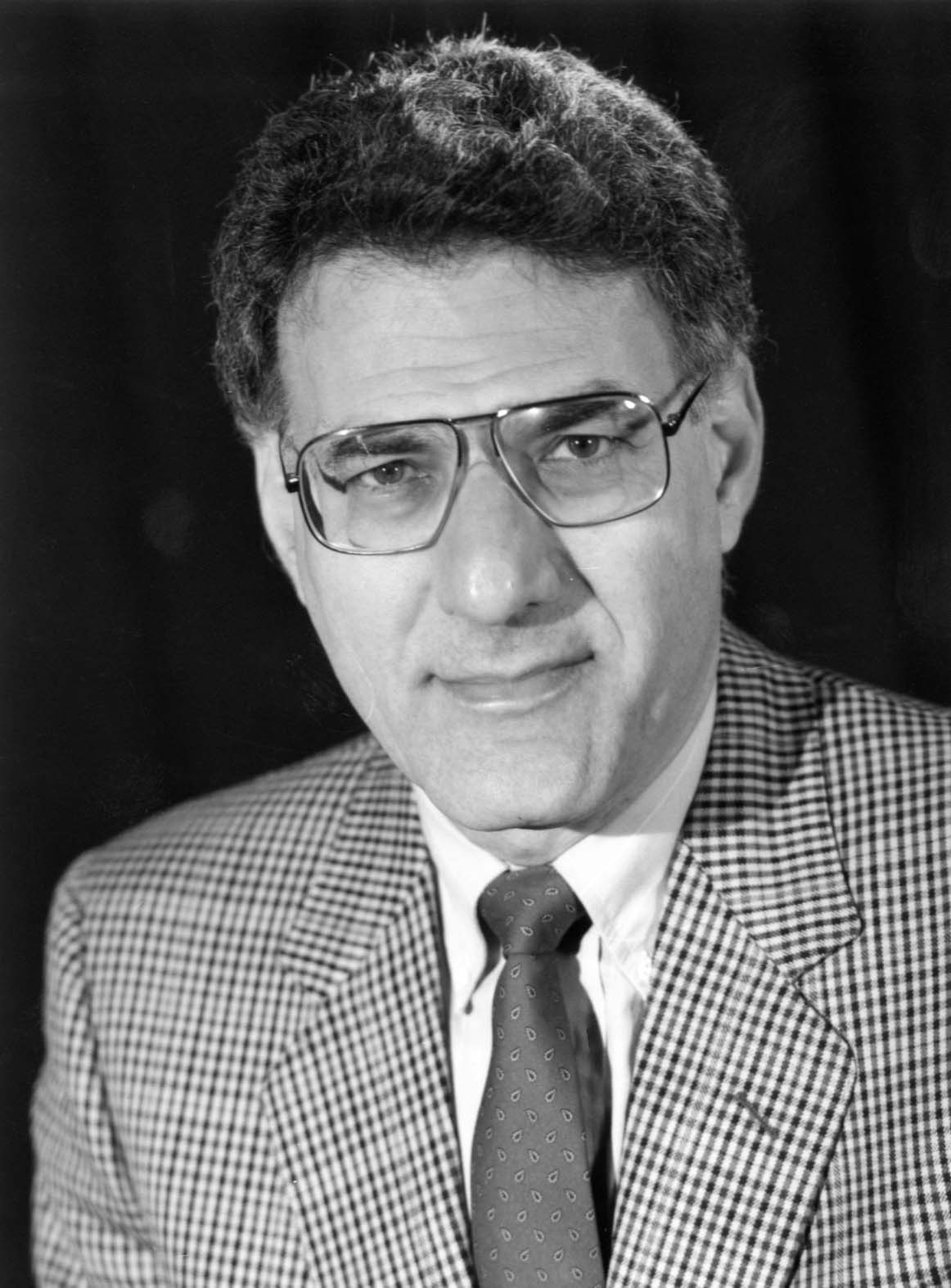
- Hanessian in 1987
- Born: April 25, 1935 (age 91); Alexandria, Egypt
- Occupations: Chemist, academic

Stephen Hanessian, OC, FRSC, (born April 25, 1935) is a chemist and professor of Canadian and United States citizenship born in Alexandria, Egypt. His research group at Université de Montréal is well known for developing synthetic methodologies, as well as natural product total synthesis. In addition, his group developed Chiron, a computer program used by organic chemists for synthetic planning.

He earned his Ph.D. at Ohio State University in 1960, under the direction of M. L. Wolfrom. He worked as a researcher for Parke-Davis & Co. in Ann Arbor, Michigan until 1968. In 1969 he joined Université de Montréal. Since 2000, he has also been an adjunct professor at University of California, Irvine.

== Awards ==
- 1974 - Merck Sharpe & Dohme Award, Chemical Institute of Canada
- 1982 - Hudson Award, American Chemical Society
- 1987 - Urgel Archambault Award
- 1988 - CIC Palladium Medal, Chemical Institute of Canada
- 1988 - Alfred Bader Award in organic chemistry, Canadian Society for Chemistry
- 1988 - Fellow of the Royal Society of Canada
- 1991 - Bell Canada-Forum Award
- 1991 - Prix Marie-Victorin
- 1992 - E. Smissman Medal, University of Kansas
- 1993 - M. L. Wolfrom Award, American Chemical Society
- 1996 - Arthur C. Cope Scholar Award, American Chemical Society
- 1997 - Izaak-Walton-Killam Award
- 1997 - Compagnon Lavoisier, Ordre des chimistes du Québec
- 1998 - Officer of the Order of Canada
