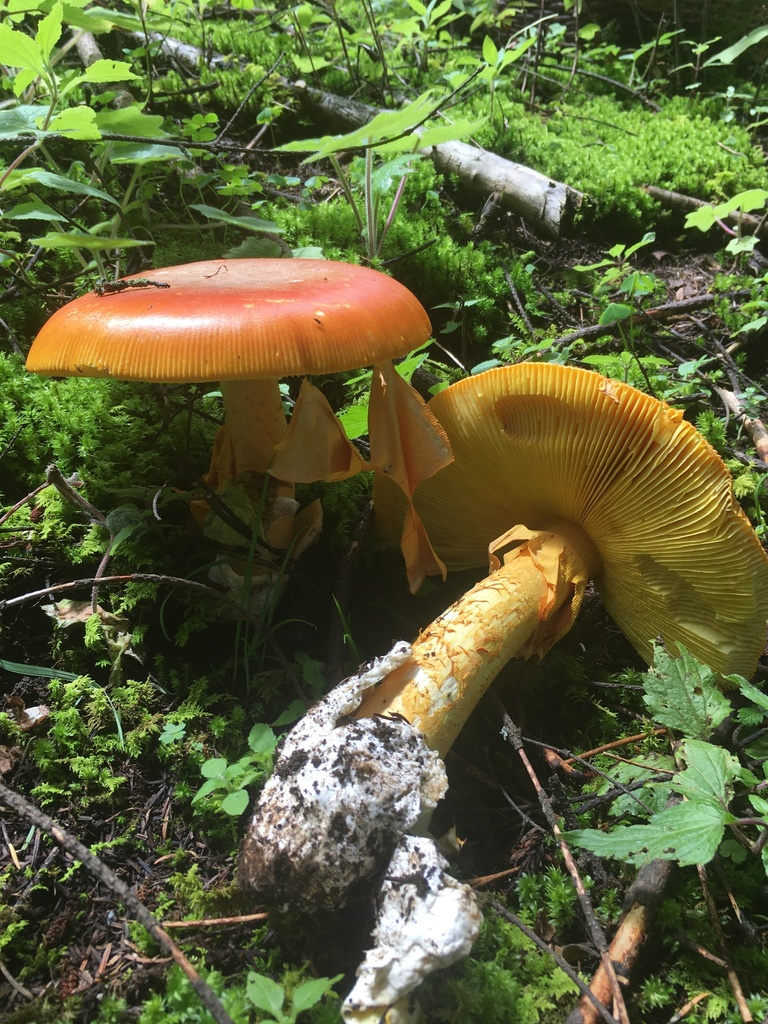

Scientific classification
- Kingdom: Fungi
- Division: Basidiomycota
- Class: Agaricomycetes
- Order: Agaricales
- Family: Amanitaceae
- Genus: Amanita
- Species: A. yema

Binomial name
- Amanita yema Guzmán & Ram.-Guill. (2001)

= Amanita yema =

Species of fungus

Amanita yema is a species of mushroom-forming fungus in the genus Amanita, family Amanitaceae. The fungi can be identified by their pileus, with a red center that gradually fades into a yellow-hued edge. Growing only in forest outskirts in Mexico, the fungus is a member of the plant biome as it is a mycorrhizal fungus.

== Taxonomy ==
Amanita yema was identified as a species of fungus in 2001 by Guzmán & Ram.-Guill. It was soon categorized under the taxa: Amanita caesarea complex

== Description ==
Standing tall with a pileus that fades from a red center to a yellow margin, this fungus stands out. With a base that ranges from a white/yellow color to an orange colored stem. Its gills, or lamella, are also described to have a white or yellow tint. Stemming from the soil, the fungus is often found around forest edges in Mexico. The fungus is said to have a mild odor and taste.

== Habitat and distribution ==
This mushroom is found in most temperate forests in Mexico and is locally used by its natives. There is a demand for this fungus in Italy, but no trade has been made with Mexico. As part of the Amanita caesarea complex, it is deemed to have a high cultural significance in Ixtlan.

== Edibility ==
This mushroom is deemed to be a wild edible fungus, and is said to have a pleasant taste. It is often consumed with other mushrooms and meat. Although with its simplicity and rather small size, many eat the mushroom by itself. With a simple light washing with water, it is ready to be cooked. It is, however, a species of fungi that is avoided, as it is similar in appearance to the toxic fungal species Amanita muscaria. Its local abundance is low.
