= Melville Wolfrom =

American chemist (1900–1969)

Melville Lawrence Wolfrom (April 2, 1900 – June 20, 1969) was an American chemist.

== Early life, education, and career ==
Melville Wolfrom's grandfather Johann Lorenz Wolfrum immigrated to the United States from Aš in 1854, and was of Sudeten German descent. His son Friedrich (Frederick) Wolfrum married Maria Louisa Sutter. Melville Wolfrom was born on April 2, 1900, the youngest of nine children. His father died when Melville was seven years old. Three of his brothers acquired a patent for a horse harness snap, and as a teen, Melville helped manufacture them out of the family home. He graduated from Ohio's Bellevue High School in 1917 as salutatorian and began working for the National Carbon Company. A year later, Wolfrom enrolled at Western Reserve University. He dropped out of the university and the Students' Army Training Corps after November 1918. In 1919, Wolfrom returned to school at Washington Square College, only to drop out a second time. He was admitted to Ohio State University in 1920. Upon graduation in 1924, Wolfrom turned to graduate school at Northwestern University, where he earned a master's and doctoral degree in 1925 and 1927, respectively. Wolfrom's postdoctoral studies were funded by the National Research Council. Wolfrom worked with Claude Hudson and Phoebus Levene before returning to Ohio State in 1928.

Wolfrom formally joined the OSU faculty in 1929 as an instructor. He was promoted to assistant professor in 1930, followed by an associate professorship in 1936. Wolfrom was awarded a Guggenheim Fellowship in 1939, and attained full professorship in 1940. In 1950, Wolfrom became the first member of OSU's Department of Chemistry faculty to be elected to membership within the National Academy of Sciences. He was followed by Melvin Spencer Newman in 1956. Wolfrom was appointed to a Regents' Professorship in 1965.

Wolfrom played an essential role in the establishment of the annual book series Advances in Carbohydrate Chemistry (which transitioned to Advances in Carbohydrate Chemistry and Biochemistry in 1969), serving as co-editor from volume 1 in 1945 to volume 24 in 1969 (excepting 1950/51). His editorial skills were shared with other chemistry publications such as Methods in Carbohydrate Chemistry, Carbohydrate Research, and Chemical Abstracts. For a quarter of a century, Wolfrom worked on the international systemization and codification of carbohydrate nomenclature.

== Personal life and legacy ==
Wolfrom married Agnes Louise Thompson on June 1, 1926. The couple had five children. Frederick died in infancy, and was followed by Eva Magdalena, twins Anne Marie and Betty Jane, and Carl Thompson. Melville Wolfrom died of a heart attack on June 20, 1969 at Ohio State University Hospital. The Melville L. Wolfrom Award given by the American Chemical Society is named for him. The Newman and Wolfrom Laboratory of Chemistry at Ohio State University was named for Wolfrom and Melvin Spencer Newman on November 3, 1995.
