= Canadian Association of Physicists =

Canadian professional society

- Association canadienne des physiciens et physiciennes
- Abbreviation: CAP / ACP
- Formation: 1945
- Type: Professional association
- Purpose: Scientific outreach
- Headquarters: Renfrew, Ontario, Canada
- Region served: Canada
- Members: ~1,600
- Official language: English, French
- President: Wendy Taylor (York University)
- Website: http://www.cap.ca

Canadian Association of Physicists (CAP), or in French Association canadienne des physiciens et physiciennes (ACP) is a Canadian professional society that focuses on creating awareness among Canadians and Canadian legislators of physics issues, sponsoring physics related events, physics outreach, and publishes Physics in Canada. It was founded in July 1945. The organization has over 1,600 members and is bilingual, functioning in English and French.

== P. Phys. professional certification ==
The CAP can appoint an official designation called the P. Phys. which stands for Professional Physicist, similar to the designation of P. Eng. which stands for Professional Engineer. This designation was unveiled at the CAP congress in 1999 and more than 200 people carry this distinction.

== Physics contests ==
The Canadian Association of Physics hosts several CAP physics contests across Canada each year, aimed at different levels of physics students. The CAP High School Prize exam is offered across Canada once a year, usually in early April, and aims to challenge physics students on their physics knowledge. It is a national exam and the top participants are invited to try out for the Canadian Physics Olympiad international team trained by volunteers from the University of British Columbia.

The CAP Lloyd G. Elliott Prize exam, also known as the "University Prize Exam", is offered once a year, usually in early February, to Canadian university undergraduate physics students. The CAP Best Student Presentation Competition is held during the CAP's annual congress. The CAP awards prizes to the physics students who make the three best oral presentations and the three physics students who make the three best poster presentations.

== CAP Congress ==
The CAP holds an annual congress each year to discuss internal matters, hold elections, hold oral and poster sessions, give formation workshops to high school physics teachers, and hold the Herzberg Public Memorial lecture. The 2026 Congress was be held at the University of Ottawa and Carleton University in Ottawa, Ontario, Canada, June 22-26. The 2027 Congress will be held at Memorial University, St. John's, Newfoundland, Canada, June 7-11.

== CAP Herzberg Medal ==
The CAP awards the Herzberg medal for outstanding research achievement by a Canadian physicist within 12 years of completing his or her doctorate. This medal is named after Canadian Nobel-prize winner Gerhard Herzberg and has been given annually since 1970.

== CAP Fellowship ==
The CAP Fellowship recognizes active members who have made significant contributions to the Canadian physics community. The inaugural recipients were Nobel Prize laureates Arthur B. McDonald and Donna Strickland.

== CAP Foundation activities ==
- The annual CAP Lecture Tour
- Awards for teachers
- High School Prize Examination
- The Lloyd G. Elliott University Prize Examination
- The Boris P. Stoicheff Memorial Graduate Scholarship
- The Canadian Undergraduate Physics Conference
- The Canada-America-Mexico (CAM) Graduate Student Conference
- The Canada-Wide Science Fair

== See also ==
- Canadian Journal of Physics
- American Association of Physicists in Medicine
- American Association of Physics Teachers
- International Association of Mathematical Physics
- International Association of Physics Students

== Archives ==
There is a Canadian Association of Physicists fonds at Library and Archives Canada. Reference number R2864.
