= Acfas - Association canadienne-française pour l'avancement des sciences =

French-Canadian society

Acfas
- Type: Regional association of scientists, non-for-profit
- Purpose: Promote sciences, open-content, support initiatives promoting sciences to the general public.
- Region served: Canada; Quebec
- Services: Conferences, communication, software, fundraising
- Website: acfas.ca

1935 Acfas Congress

Acfas is the principal French-language learned society in Canada and, particularly, Quebec.

The Acfas was founded in 1923 as the Association canadienne-française pour l'avancement des sciences ('French-Canadian Association for the Advancement of Science'). Its name was changed in 2001 to the Association francophone pour le savoir ('French-language Association for Knowledge). Despite the name change, Acfas retained the acronym by which it has become known. Since May 2019, the Association has simply been called Acfas.

The first president was Léo Pariseau. The current president (2024–2026) is Martin Maltais.

The association played an important role in building Francophone Quebec's scholarly community, supporting the growth of an intellectual milieu outside the formal boundaries of the Catholic Church. Among its founders were prominent French-Canadian intellectual such as Brother Marie-Victorin, the father of biology in francophone Quebec, and the radiologist Léo Pariseau. Today Acfas is best known for the scholarly prizes it awards annually and for its yearly conference of French-language learned societies in Canada, which is hosted by a different university each year, usually in Quebec.

The Jacques Rousseau Award is an award given by ACFAS to an individual or group who develop bridges between scientific disciplines. The award is named for Jacques Rousseau who was both a botanist and an anthropologist. He was a former secretary of Acfas.

The Georges-Henri Lévesque Award is an award given every year by Acfas to the Canadian students who have written the best French-language master's thesis in anthropology and sociology.
