= Young Liberals of Canada =

National youth wing of the Liberal Party of Canada

Young Liberals of Canada Jeunes libéraux du Canada
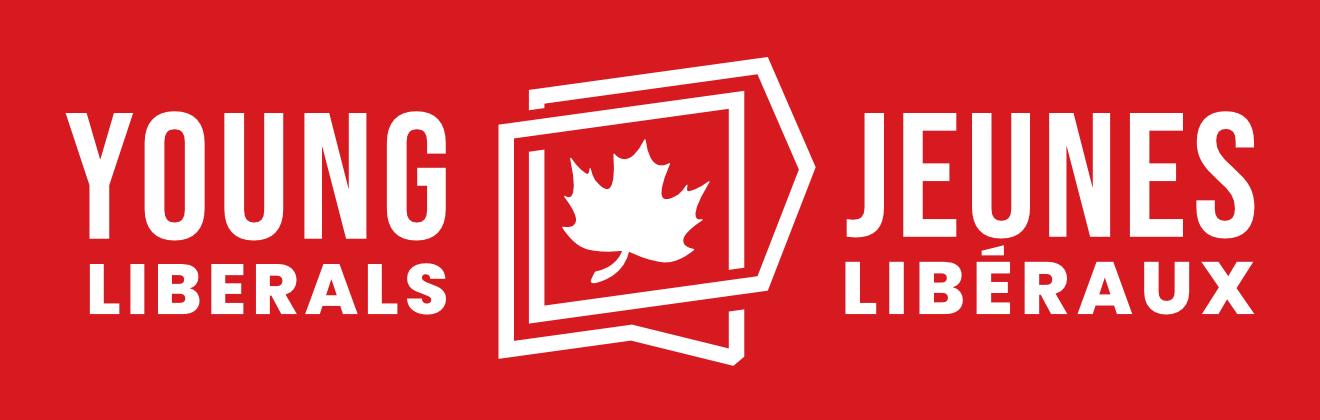
- Abbreviation: YLC / JLC
- Formation: 1936
- Headquarters: Constitution Square; 350 Albert Street; Suite 920; Ottawa, Ontario; K1P 6M8
- Members: 17 000 (2024)
- Official languages: English, French
- National Chair: Nicholas Aboagye
- Parent organization: Liberal Party of Canada
- Affiliations: International Federation of Liberal Youth
- Staff: 1 (full-time)
- Website: uptoyouth.ca and youngliberals.liberal.ca

The Young Liberals of Canada (YLC) (French: Jeunes libéraux du Canada) is the national youth wing of the Liberal Party of Canada. All members of the Liberal Party aged 14 to 25 are automatically members of the YLC. The Young Liberals of Canada are an official commission of the Liberal Party and the largest youth political organization in Canada.

The YLC is composed of Provincial and Territorial Boards (PTBs) in all ten provinces and clubs on almost 50 post-secondary campuses and in most of Canada's 343 ridings. The organization is led by the National Executive. Several major initiatives by Liberal governments over the years have started out as Young Liberal ideas, including same-sex marriage, marijuana legalization and medical assistance in dying.

Many Young Liberal alumni have gone on to have prominent careers in Canadian politics, including former prime ministers Jean Chrétien and Paul Martin and former cabinet ministers Bardish Chagger and Karina Gould, among others.

== History & Influence ==
=== Nascent presence, 1800s ===
Associations of young partisan supporters of the Liberals began to form in the late 1870s. The Globe, a Toronto newspaper with strong Liberal leaning founded by key pre-confederation Liberal leader George Brown, reported in October 1877 the formation of a Young Men's Reform Association in Owen Sound, Ontario, a major port town at the time. In February 1878, a Young Men's Reform Association was formed in Ottawa in response to the Young Men's Liberal-Conservative Association which had been in existence for a number of years. Activities of other young reform/liberals associations were reported by the Globe later in 1878 in Toronto, Montreal, Belleville, Peterboro', Lindsay, Port Hope, London, and Stratford in the lead up of that years dominion election (which ended the Liberal government led by Prime Minister Alexander Mackenzie).These associations' names reflected the name of the General Reform Association, the informal network of organizations providing organizational support to Liberal politicians before the formal establishment of party apparatus. In 1885, a convention of young liberals was held in Toronto.

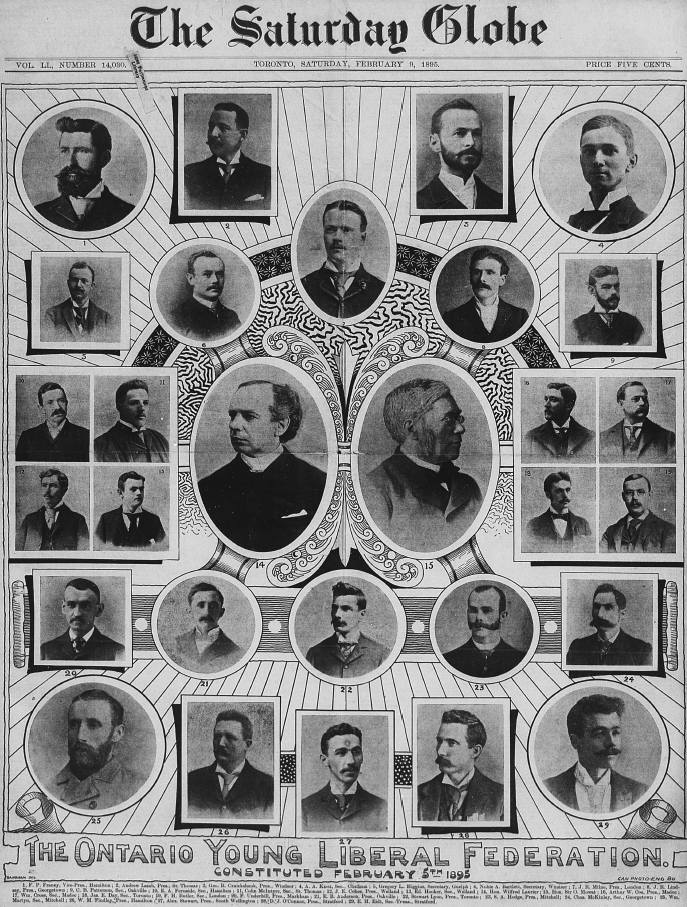
The cover of the Saturday Globe following a young liberal convention held in Toronto in 1895.

Delegates from Young Liberal Clubs in Ontario met in convention in February 1895 and established the Ontario Young Liberal Federation. The convention was held with the attendance of then leader of the Opposition Wilfrid Laurier, then Ontario education minister (and future Premier) George Ross and Liberal MP William Paterson in attendance, and the Globe gave it front page promotional treatment on its Saturday edition that week. Having been a young precocious minister in the Mackenzie Ministry and assumed leadership when he was younger than most of his caucus peers, Laurier paid much attention to the young partisans. When asked by reporters about rumours of his ill health in 1897, he responded by laughing and said he was "looking forward with pleasure to the meeting of the Young Liberal Federation later that evening".

=== Guaranteed disproportionate clout, 1948 to 2009 ===
In seven leadership contests over 60 years, Young Liberals collectively wield outsized sway on party affairs due to structural measures that were instituted deliberately by the party. The outsized influence was derived primarily from generous allocations of delegate accreditations to youth at Liberal Party conventions. Starting at the 1948 leadership convention, specific numbers of delegates accreditations were allocated to young liberal clubs at post-secondary campuses, These delegates were separate from and in addition to regular constituency delegates, which young liberals could also be elected as. The proportion of youth delegates would increase further in subsequent leader contests, peaking at the 2003 contest where Paul Martin, a former University of Toronto Young Liberal, succeeded his long time rival Jean Chretien, a former president of the Université Laval Young Liberals, as party leader and prime minister.

When the Liberal Party of Canada held its second leadership convention in 1948 that elected Louis St Laurent as leader, it allocated for the first time a guaranteed number of delegates to the Young Liberals. The conventions composition largely followed the composition of the 1919 convention that elected William Lyon Mackenzie King but with two significant changes, both impacting young liberals. Delegate accreditations were granted to the president and two officers of the Young Liberal Federation and the Women Liberal Federation of each of the nine provinces along with the national president of the federations. The eighteen university liberal clubs that were active at the time were also given three delegates each. The changes added 82 youth delegates to the convention delegate composition, guaranteeing the Young Liberals at minimum 6.3% among the 1302 votes present to choose the next party leader, a percentage that would rise in subsequent contest. In appreciation for the outgoing leader's granting them a place at the convention, a large crowd of Young Liberals with banners waited at the Prime Minister residence on the Thursday of the convention, broke out in a chorus of “He’s a Jolly Good Fellow" when King stepped out much to the retiring chief delight.

In an attempt to attract Young Liberal supporters for his 1968 leadership bid, Pierre Trudeau campaigned on the promise of reserving specific number of riding delegate spots at national conventions to Young Liberals. Trudeau went on to win the party leadership, and YLC was allocated guaranteed number of delegate spots in each riding association and in addition to accredited campus Liberal clubs.

This has meant the YLC has wielded disproportionate influence in the party's leadership selection as it controls the accreditation process of campus clubs, which were fierce battlegrounds during federal leadership races from the early 1980s to 2006. Trudeau's government also lowered the voting age to 18 in 1970, further endearing him to Young Liberals.

During the 1980s, YLC members found themselves on both sides of raging intra-party debates. During the 1986 leadership review, some supported leader John Turner, such as future MP Joe Peschisolido, while others opposed him, including YLC-Quebec President and future politician Denis Coderre (who publicly called for Turner's resignation.) During the 1990 leadership race, the Paul Martin leadership campaign was particularly notorious for hostile take over of campus clubs, though many Young Liberals supported the eventual winner (and YLC alumni), Jean Chrétien.

The YLC's influence in the leadership selection process was greatly diminished in 2009 when the federal party changed its constitution to elect its future leaders by a "weighted One Member, One Vote" voting method.

=== Incubator for political leaders, trendsetter for progressive ideas ===
The Young Liberals of Canada were founded in 1936, though youth had played a role in the Liberal Party (particularly election campaigns) since its founding. During the 1950s and 60s, future Prime Ministers Jean Chrétien and Paul Martin were both active Young Liberals. Chrétien, who joined during law school at Université Laval, was elected president of the uLaval Young Liberals in 1958 (no one else wanted the job, as everyone else was too afraid of drawing the ire of the Union Nationale.) Martin was active during his years at the University of Toronto, where future Liberal leaders Michael Ignatieff and Bob Rae were also engaged in Young Liberal activities on campus.

Under the leadership of president (and future MP) Greg Fergus, the YLC began to push for the legalization of same-sex marriage in 1994, the first group in the Liberal Party to do so. The 2003 leadership race, which saw YLC alum Paul Martin become prime minister, again featured heavy Young Liberal involvement, with intense battles for delegates on many campuses (especially by the Martin campaign.) Young Liberals mobilized against Canada's proposed entry into United States Missile Defence System in 2005, helping convince the Martin Government to say no to the Americans.

Following the Liberal Party's historic defeat in 2011, the YLC helped lead the process of party renewal by assisting youth in taking on new leadership roles and promoting new progressive policies. Most prominently, Young Liberal policies advocating for the legalization of marijuana (first passed by the YLC-British Columbia) and medical assistance in dying (passed by the Ontario Young Liberals) were overwhelmingly endorsed by the party's entire membership at the 2012 and 2014 Biennial conventions and were key planks in the 2015 election platform.

The election of the youthful and energetic Justin Trudeau as Liberal leader in 2013 helped attract new Young Liberals. The younger Trudeau has proven as popular with Canadian youth as his father, helping the YLC recruit new members and ensuring youth concerns were included in the Liberals 2015 election platform. This popularity, coupled with the YLC's efforts, helped ensure a record youth turnout in the 2015 election, which made the difference in securing a majority government. Following the Liberals' victory, Trudeau appointed himself as his government's Minister of Youth, a move that met with approval from many Young Liberals. As part of larger reforms to the Liberal Party's internal structures beginning in 2016, the YLC's Constitution was replaced by a new Charter.

YLC has also sometimes been a source of embarrassments and scandals for the party.

- In 1997, Jim MacLaren, president of the BC wing, misappropriated $30,000 from the federal party's coffers, and was later convicted of fraud.
- In 1999, several drunken Young Liberal delegates attending a convention in Victoria smashed up a couple of hotel rooms. The Liberal Party was sued by the hotel and settled out of court for an undisclosed amount.
- In 2000, Jesse Davidson, president of the Ontario wing, faced one count of fraud over $5,000 and 23 counts for allegedly drewing money from the party's bank account by forging the signature of a former treasurer. The charges were dropped in 2011 in exchange of Davidson agreeing to repay some $7,000 that he withdrew from the party's bank account.
- In 2007, a former president of the BC wing, Erik Bornmann, was implicated by the investigation following the BC Legislature Raids, and served as a key witness in a trial that pertains to the scandal.
- In 2015, YLC-BC President Linda Ching was discovered to be the daughter of Cheng Muyang, a fugitive wanted by Chinese authorities for graft. Cheng is believed to have helped his daughter secure the position of president. After Cheng's fugitive status became publicly known, Linda Ching quietly called an election, but did not resign.

== Policy ==
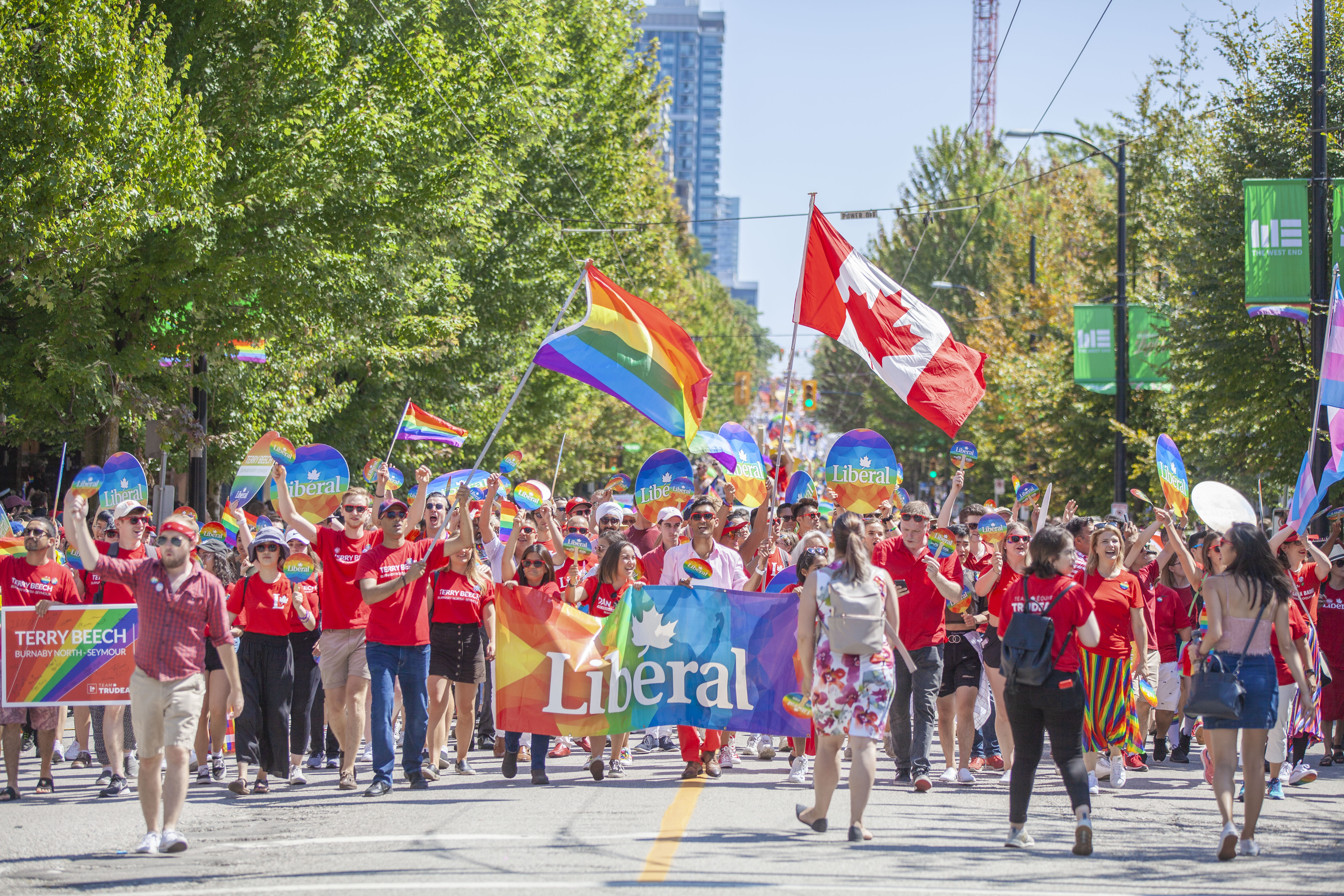
Liberal MPs, candidates and supporters participating in the Vancouver Pride Parade 2019

Developing and promoting progressive policies is at the core of the YLC's mission. The YLC brings a slate of policies to every Liberal Biennial Convention, which are solicited, debated and voted on every two years in the lead-up to the convention. In many policy areas, Young Liberals have been more progressive than the party as a whole, taking a pro-same sex marriage position as early as 1994. During the Liberal governments of Jean Chrétien and Paul Martin (1993–2006), the YLC successfully pushed initiatives like the long-term commitment to Africa, the Canada Post-Secondary Education Transfer, the promotion and protection of safe-injection sites and the commitment to the Kyoto Accord. The 2005 decision of the Martin Liberal government to not enter into the American missile defence program was in part credited to the opposition of the Young Liberals.

During the Harper years (2006–2015), the YLC redoubled its focus on advocacy and highlighted the government's neglect of youth issues. In response to Conservative TV and radio attack ads, the YLC launched the "Hi.im.a.liberal.ca" initiative, a spoof of the Mac/PC ads, which garnered media attention for its novelty. In May 2010, they began a campaign in opposition to Bill C-391 and in support of the federal long gun registry. Other initiatives during this period included the "Red Revolution" campaign (focusing on "taking Canada back" by improving youth involvement in politics), the "Go Green, Vote Red" initiative (to appeal to environmentally-minded voters and promote the party's "Green Shift" program) and the "End the Crisis" campaign (to increase the admission of Middle Eastern refugees displaced by the Syrian Civil War).

== Former members in elected office ==
The Young Liberal of Canada has served as training ground for budding political leader for over a century. Numerous young liberals went on to become elected official. Three permanent leaders of the party, including two Prime Ministers, had formal involvement as young liberals. The organizations also produced a number provincial leaders, and at least two provincial premiers.

=== Lists of elected office holders who were involved as young liberals ===
The lists are ordered by date first elected to public office.

Currently in public office

==== National party leaders ====
Name	Public office tenure	Office held	Known roles as Young Liberal
Jean Chrétien	1963 - 2003	(Canada) National leader 1990–2003; Prime Minister 1993–2003; Deputy Prime Minister 1984, cabinet minister 1967-79 & 80-84 (Pearson, P. Trudeau I, II, Turner Ministries) (Quebec) (New Brunswick) MP for Saint-Maurice 1963-86 & 1993–2004, for Beauséjour 1990-93	President of the Université Laval Young Liberals
Paul Martin	1988 - 2008	(Canada) National leader 2003–06; Prime Minister 2003–06; Minister of Finance 1993-2002 (Chrétien Ministry) (Quebec) MP for of LaSalle—Émard 1984-2008	Involved since childhood by nature of being son of MP, cabinet minister and leadership contender Paul Martin Sr. Member of the University of Toronto Young Liberals
Michael Ignatieff	2006 - 2011	(Canada) National leader 2008–11, deputy leader 2006–08 (Ontario) MP for Etobicoke—Lakeshore 2006-11	Ignatieff and his then roommate (and future leadership rival four decades later, and successor as leader) Bob Rae were both involved in Pierre Trudeau's 1968 Liberal leadership campaign
Bob Rae	2006 - 2013 1978 - 1996 (as member of the NDP)	(Canada) Interim national leader 2011–13, MP for Toronto Centre 2008–13 As member of the NDP: Premier of Ontario 1990-95, Ontario NDP leader 1982-96; MP for Broadview-Greenwood 1978-82	Rae and his then roommate (and future leadership rival four decades later) Michael Ignatieff were both involved in Pierre Trudeau's 1968 Liberal leadership campaign; a volunteer in long time MP Charles Caccia's first local campaign in 1968

==== Provincial party leaders ====
Name	Public office tenure	Office held	Known roles as Young Liberal
William Melville Martin	1908 - 1922	Liberal Party of Saskatchewan leader 1916–22; Premier of Saskatchewan 1916–22; MLA for Regina City 1916–22; MP for Regina 1908–16; Later Chief Justice of Saskatchewan 1941-61	Elected Secretary of the Ontario Young Liberal Federation at its 1895 convention while a student at University of Toronto, before moving to Regina in 1903.
Ralph Goodale	1974 - 2019	(Canada) Deputy national leader 2010-15; Cabinet minister 1993-2006 & 2015-19 (Chrétien, Martin & J. Trudeau Ministries); MP for Regina-Wascana 1993-2019 & for Assiniboia 1974–79; Saskatchewan Liberal Party leader 1981–88; MLA for Assiniboia-Gravelbourg 1986-88	President of the Saskatchewan Young Liberals; First elected MP at age 24
Christy Clark	1996 - 2005; 2011 - 2017	British Columbia Liberal Party leader 2011–17; Premier of British Columbia 2011–17; Deputy Premier & minister 2001-04 (Campbell ministry); MLA for Port Moody-Westwood 1996–2005, Vancouver-Point Grey 2011–13, for Kelowna West 2013-17	Involved since childhood by nature of being daughter of three-time BC Liberal candidate Jim Clark; YLC's Vice President External 1990–92, National Director 1993-95; President of Simon Fraser University Young Liberals in mid 1980s
Steven Del Duca	2012–present	Ontario Liberal Party leader 2020-22; Ontario minister 2014-18 (Wynne ministry); MPP for Vaughan 2012–18; Mayor of Vaughan since 2022	President of the University of Toronto Liberals
Bonnie Crombie	2008–26	Ontario Liberal Party leader 2023–25; MP for Mississauga—Streetsville 2008–11; Mayor of Mississauga 2012–23	Student Director of Ontario New Liberals

==== Members of Parliament ====
Name	Public office tenure	Office held	Known roles as Young Liberal
Marcel Prud'homme	1964 - 1993; 1993 - 2009	(Quebec) MP for Saint-Denis 1964-93 (Quebec) Senator for La Salle 1993-2009	Elected YLC president in 1958
Jean Lapierre	1979 - 1993 (1990-93 as an independent and then Bloc MP) 2004 - 2007	(Quebec) MP for Shefford 1979–1993, for Outremont 2004 - 2007; Minister of Transport 2004-06 (Martin Ministry)	First elected MP at age 23
David Smith	1980 - 1984; 2002 - 2016	(Ontario) MP for Don Valley East 1980–84; Cabinet minister 1983-84 (P. Trudeau II & Turner ministries) (Ontario) Senator for Cobourg 2002–16; Toronto Alderman 1972–78, Deputy Mayor 1976–78	National President of the Young Liberal Federation in the 1960s, and an key aide to Keith Davey, Liberal national campaign director in the 1960s and 1970s Worked as executive assistant (as ministerial chief of staff was known then) to Walter Gordon and John Turner while in his 20s
Mauril Bélanger	1995 - 2016	(Ontario) MP for Ottawa-Vanier 1995-2016; Cabinet minister 2004-06 (Martin Ministry)	
Sandra Pupatello	1995–2011 since 2025	Senator for Ontario since 2025; MPP for Windsor West / Windsor—Sandwich 1995–2011; Ontario minister 2003-11 (McGuinty ministry)	Became politically active in her teens in the 1970s campaigning for local Liberal MP Herb Gray.
Denis Coderre	1997 - 2013	(Quebec) MP for Bourassa 1997-2013; Cabinet minister 1999-2004 (Chrétien & Martin Ministries); Mayor of Montreal 2013-17	As president of YLC's Quebec wing called for the resignation of Leader John Turner
Dominic LeBlanc	since 2000	(New Brunswick) MP for Beauséjour since 2000; Cabinet minister since 2015 (J. Trudeau & Carney Ministries)	Life intertwined with the party since being born on the day of Prime Minister Pearson's retirement announcement to Pearson's then press secretary Romeo Leblanc, later MP/Cabinet Minister/Governor General. Involved with University of Toronto Young Liberals during university studies. Worked as an aide to party leader Jean Chretien since age 23.
Joe Peschisolido	2000 - 2004 (as a Canadian Alliance MP) 2015 - 2019	(British Columbia) MP for Steveston-Richmond East 2015–19 As member of the Canadian Alliance: MP for Richmond 2000-04	President of the University of Toronto Liberals; Member of the YLC's National Executive in the 1980s youth organizer for Jean Chretien 1984 and 1990 leadership bid
Mark Holland	2004 - 2011; 2015 - 2025	(Ontario) MP for Ajax 2004–11, 2015-25; Cabinet minister 2021-25 (J. Trudeau Ministry)	Started volunteering on local liberal campaign at age 12, youth organizer in Gerrard Kennedy 1996 Ontario Liberal Leadership campaign
Ruby Dhalla	2004 - 2011	(Ontario) MP for Brampton-Springdale 2004–11; 2025 federal leadership contestant	Member of the YLC's national executive
Borys Wrzesnewskyj	2004 - 2011; 2015 - 2019	(Ontario) MP for Etobicoke Centre 2004-11	
Scott Andrews	2008 - 2015	(Newfoundland and Labrador) MP for Avalon 2008-15	YLC vice president Contested YLC's presidency at the 1998 convention
Yasir Naqvi	2007 - 2018 since 2021	MP for Ottawa Centre since 2021; MPP for Ottawa Centre 2011-21; Ontario minister 2013-18 (Wynne ministry); 2023 Ontario Liberal leadership contestant	Involved in local campaigns in Niagara Falls while a high school student, and in Ottawa during university studies
Rob Oliphant	2008 - 2011 since 2015	(Ontario) MP for Don Valley West 2008-11 & since 2015	President of the University of Toronto Liberals; Youth chair of David Peterson's 1976 Ontario leadership campaign Executive of Ontario New Liberals in the 1970s
Michael Coteau	since 2011	MP for Don Valley East since 2021; MPP for Don Valley East 2011-21; Ontario minister 2013-18 (Wynne ministry); Runner-up for Ontario Liberal leadership in 2020	President of the Carleton Liberals
Yvan Baker	since 2014	(Ontario) MP for Etobicoke Centre since 2019 (Ontario) MPP for Etobicoke Centre 2014-18	
Han Dong	2014 - 2025	(Ontario) MP for Don Valley North 2019-25 (Ontario) MPP for Trinity—Spadina 2014-18	Started involvement at age 19 as volunteer and then aide to MP/federal minister Maria Minna, then aide to MPP/Ontario minister Gerry Phillips while in his 20s.
Arnold Chan	2014 - 2017	(Ontario) MP for Scarborough-Agincourt 2014-17	
Bardish Chagger	since 2015	(Ontario) MP for Waterloo since 2015; Cabinet minister 2015-21 (J. Trudeau Ministry)	Started volunteering on local liberal campaign age 13; President of the University of Waterloo Young Liberals
Pam Damoff	2015 - 2025	(Ontario) MP for Oakville North-Burlington 2015-25	
Matt DeCourcey	2015 - 2019	(New Brunswick) MP for Fredericton 2015-19	Youth organizer in Paul Martin's 2003and Michael Igantieff's 2006 leadership campaigns
Francis Drouin	2015 - 2025	(Ontario) MP for Glengarry-Prescott-Russell 2015-25	President of local constituency young liberals club (Ottawa South), aide to Ontario Premier Dalton McGuinty while youth.
Ali Ehsassi	since 2015	(Ontario) MP for Willowdale since 2015; Cabinet Minister 2025 (Carney ministry)	President of the University of Toronto Liberals
Greg Fergus	since 2015	(Quebec) MP for Hull-Aylmer since 2015; Speaker of the House of Commons 2023-25	YLC National President 1994-96
Steven MacKinnon	since 2015	(Quebec) MP for Gatineau since 2015; Cabinet minister since 2024 (J. Trudeau & Carney Ministries)	Worked as an aide to New Brunswick Premier Frank McKenna starting at age 21.
Bryan May	2015 - 2025	(Ontario) MP for Cambridge 2015-25	Started involvement during 1995 Quebec referendum
Anita Vandenbeld	since 2015	(Ontario) MP for Ottawa West—Nepean since 2015	President of the University of Calgary Young Liberals
Emmanuella Lambropoulos	since 2017	(Quebec) MP for Saint-Laurent since 2017	Involved with MP Stephane Dion's local campaign prior to succeeding him at age 26.
Ben Carr	since 2023	(Manitoba) MP for Winnipeg South Centre since 2023	Involved since childhood by nature of being son of Manitoba MLA Jim Carr, later federal MP whose seat he filled following the elder Carr's death.
Leslie Church	since 2025	(Ontario) MP for Toronto—St. Paul's since 2025	Involved while student at University of Alberta and University of Toronto, key member of Michael Ignatieff's 2006 leadership bid while youth
Vince Gasparro	since 2025	(Ontario) MP for Eglinton—Lawrence since 2025	Youth organizer for Paul Martin's 2003 leadership bid, and later junior Ontario desk in Martin's PMO.
Giovanna Mingarelli	since 2025	(Ontario) MP for Glengarry-Prescott-Russell since 2025	President of local constituency young liberals club in 2000s (Ottawa West)
John Zerucelli	since 2025	(Ontario) MP for Etobicoke North since 2025; Secretary of State for Labour since 2025 (Carney ministry)	Interned in federal minister Allan Rock's office in early 2000s, key youth leader of Rock's exploratory leadership bid.
Fares Al Soud	since 2025	(Ontario) MP for Mississauga Centre since 2025	Involved in campaign of local MP and cabinet minister Omar Alghabra; ministerial aide to Alghabra, Diane Lebouthillier and in the Prime Minister's Office before succeeding Olghabra as MP while qualified as a Young Liberal member.
Tatiana Auguste	since 2025	(Quebec) MP for Terrebonne since 2025	First elected while qualified as a Young Liberal member
Jake Sawatzky	since 2025	(British Columbia) MP for New Westminster—Burnaby—Maillardville since 2025	First elected while qualified as a Young Liberal member. Liberal Youth Caucus Chair in the House of Commons.
Amandeep Sodhi	since 2025	(Ontario) MP for Brampton Centre since 2025	First elected while qualified as a Young Liberal member

==== Members of provincial legislatures ====
Name	Public office tenure	Office held	Known roles as Young Liberal
Dwight Duncan	1995 - 2013	MPP for Windsor—Tecumseh 1995–2013; Ontario minister 2003–13, Deputy Premier of Ontario 2011-13 (McGuinty ministry); 1996 Ontario Liberal leadership contestant Windsor City Councillor 1988–94	Involved in the party since a teenager, in his 20s worked as aide to Windsor MP/federal minister Herb Gray and MPP/provincial minister Bill Wrye, contested the presidency of YLC's Ontario wing
George Smitherman	1999 - 2010	MPP for Toronto Centre 1999–2010; Ontario minister 2003–10, Deputy Premier of Ontario 2006-10 (McGuinty ministry)	In his early 20s worked as an organizer for the Ontario Liberal Party, and was chief aide to Ontario cabinet minister Hugh O'Neil
Deb Matthews	2003 - 2018	MPP for London North Centre 2003–18; Ontario minister 2007-18 (McGuinty & Wynne ministries), Deputy Premier of Ontario 2013-18 (Wynne ministry)	Managed local campaign of her brother-in-law David Peterson, later Premier, while in her 20s
John Milloy	2003 - 2014	MPP for Kitchener Centre 2003–14; Ontario minister 2007–14 (McGuinty and Wynne Ministries)	Started involvement while in high school on campaigns of local MPP Herb Epp.Hon. John Milloy, Government House Leader (2013-12-04). "Tribute to Herb Epp". Parliamentary Debates (Hansard). Province of Ontario: Legislative Assembly. p. 4911.
Todd Stone	2013 - 2024	MLA for Kamloops-South Thompson 2013–24; British Columbia Minister of Transportation and Infrastructure 2013-17 (Christy Clark ministry); 2018 BC Liberal leadership contestant	Involved in local liberal campaigns while youth since 1991
Patricia Arab	2013 - 2024	MLA for Fairview-Clayton Park 2013–24; Nova Scotia minister 2017-21 (McNeil & Rankin ministries)	
Cindy Lamoureux	since 2016	Interim Manitoba Liberal leader 2023-25; MLA for Tyndall Park since 2019, for Burrows 2016–2019	Involved since childhood by nature of being daughter of long time MLA/MP Kevin Lamoureux
Jonathan Tsao	since 2025	(Ontario) MPP for Don Valley North since 2025; Toronto City Councillor for Ward 33 (Don Valley East) 2018	President of the Ontario Young Liberals 2009–11

=== Other politicians ===
- Mitchell Brownstein, Mayor of Côte St. Luc, Quebec

=== Elected MPs as members of other parties ===
- Stephen Harper, Conservative Prime Minister 2006-15 (a Young Liberal before joining the Conservatives)
- Jason Kenney, Conservative Premier of Alberta 2019–22, leader of the United Conservative Party 2017–22, federal cabinet minister 2007–15, Conservative, Alliance and Reform MP for Calgary Midnapore 1997–2016
  (aide to Saskatchewan Liberal leader Ralph Goodale)

== Notable executives ==
Past Presidents:

- Greg Fergus (1994–96)

Past National Directors:

- Christy Clark

== International ==
The organization is a member of the International Federation of Liberal Youth, and at one time sent delegates to international gatherings of youth from Liberal parties around the world.
