= Ontario Young Liberals =

- Abbreviation: OYL
- Formation: 1971
- Headquarters: 344 Bloor Street W Suite 404; Toronto, Ontario; M5S 3A7
- Location: Ontario, Canada
- President: Palwashah Ali
- Parent organization: Ontario Liberal Party
- Website: Website

The Ontario Young Liberals (OYL) is the official youth wing of the Ontario Liberal Party. The OYL's membership includes all members of the Ontario Liberal Party who are aged 25 and under. The organization has local branches called "student clubs" (associations of members at post secondary institutions) and "riding clubs" (associations of members residing in electoral districts), though members are not required to be associated with any such clubs. It is led by a 22-member executive board.

Until 2017, the OYL was also recognized by the Liberal Party of Canada as its youth wing in Ontario. In 2016, at the Liberal Party of Canada Biennial Convention in Winnipeg, the federal party passed a constitutional amendment that ceased recognition of its element organizations that are jointly recognized provincial liberal parties. A separate Ontario "section" of the Young Liberals of Canada was created to serve as its youth organization in Ontario.

== History ==
OYL logo, 2003–2009

Associations of Liberals on university and college campus existed prior to the 1970s, and were loosely affiliated with the party each other through the Ontario Student Liberals. In 1971, the organization was formally established as the Ontario New Liberals and was known as such until the mid-1980s.

The organization has been a preparation ground for budding politicians and political organizers. Many elected officials and partisan with public prominence were active members of the OYL in their youth. These include:

- Yvan Baker, MP and former MPP for Etobicoke Centre
- Arnold Chan, Former MP for Scarborough—Agincourt
- Bonnie Crombie, Leader of the Ontario Liberal Party, Former Mayor of Mississauga and former MP for Mississauga—Streetsville (served on as Student Director of the OYL)
- Steven Del Duca, Former leader of the Ontario Liberal Party, former MPP for Vaughan and Ontario Minister of Transportation (served as President of the University of Toronto Liberals)
- Dwight Duncan, Former MPP for Windsor—Tecumseh and Ontario Finance Minister (served on the executive of the OYL and contested its presidency)
- Michael Ignatieff, Former leader of the Liberal Party of Canada and former MP for Etobicoke-Lakeshore (served as a staff youth organizer in the national headquarters)
- Rob Oliphant, MP for Don Valley West (served on the executive of the OYL)
- Ruby Dhalla, Former MP for Brampton—Springdale (served on the national executive of Young Liberals of Canada)

== Influence ==
OYL logo, 2000–2003

Since the Liberal Party allocates specific number of delegate spots for campus liberal associations at its national convention, key players of the OYL wielded unique influence in the party’s leadership selection as it has the largest number of campus associations under its jurisdiction. OYL had been a fierce battleground during federal leadership races from the early 1980s to 2006. The Paul Martin leadership campaign was particularly notorious for hostile take over of campus liberal associations leading up to the 1990 and 2003 contests.

== Structure ==
OYL logo, 2009–2017

The OYL executive is made up of 22 OYL members elected to one-year terms by the membership at the OYL Annual General Meeting. The structure of the Executive consists of a President, Executive Vice-President, Vice-President (Organization), Vice-President (French), Vice-President (Equity), Treasurer, Riding Director, Student Director, Policy Director, Communications Director, Community Engagement Director, Election Readiness Director and 9 Regional Coordinators, as well as a high school coordinator.

The current executive is as follows:

2025-2026 OYL Executive
Position	Name
President	Palwashah Ali
Executive Vice-President	Keagan McNeil
Vice-President (Organization)	Stacy Kiseliouk
Vice-President (French)	Lauren Wilkinson
Vice-President (Equity)	Emma Fortunato
Treasurer	Shyan Hayder
Communications Director	Soobin Sung
Policy Director	Gilvan Greig-Clarke
Student Director	Devon Jarovi
Riding Director	Ewan Wilton
Election Readiness Director	Hamza Kamal
Community Engagement Director	Domenic Sbergio
North Regional Coordinator	TBD
Eastern Regional Coordinator	Martin Spielauer
Central West Regional Coordinator	Layeebah Ahmad
Central East Regional Coordinator	Kennedy Steeves
Central North Regional Coordinator	Daniel Mojarrab
Toronto (Etobicoke/Downtown/East York) Regional Coordinator	Luke Calabretta
Toronto (York/North York/Scarborough) Regional Coordinator	Erin Strachan
South Central Regional Coordinator	Johl Emtage-Cave
Southwestern Regional Coordinator	Yazdan Nikoo
High School Coordinator	Raheem White

=== Regions ===
The OYL recognizes nine distinct regions of the province, that align with the Ontario Liberal Party's regional breakdown. Each region is represented by a Regional Coordinator. Each region is further broken down by areas, although these area divisions are seldom used. The nine regions are: North Region, East, Central West, Central East, Central North, Toronto (Etobicoke/Downtown/East York), Toronto (York/North York/Scarborough), South Central and Southwestern.

=== Affiliated clubs ===
The OYL is composed of riding and campus clubs. Riding clubs are based in each provincial electoral district. Campus clubs are located at universities and colleges in Ontario.

Each club has a constitution, which must agree with the constitutions of the Ontario Liberal Party and the OYL. Each club has an executive, and conducts activities such as community outreach, social events, policy meetings and assists in campaigns during federal or provincial elections.

=== OYL Annual General Meeting ===
The executive of the OYL is elected to a 12 to 18 month term at the Annual General Meeting of the OYL. As of 2021, the OYL AGM is held in conjunction with the Ontario Liberal Party's AGM and Policy Conference.

=== OYL Summer Fling ===
In the summer of 2002, the OYL created a new signature event called Summer Fling, which was held at Wilfrid Laurier University the inaugural year. The event was led and organized by OYL executives Eric Davis and Simon Tunstall. Tunstall currently serves as Executive Director of the Ontario Liberal Party.

The OYL Summer Fling typically includes a Friday night social, the OYL's annual policy conference, keynote speeches, issue-focused panels featuring guest speakers, and workshops. The event also features volunteer recognition and club awards. Over time, it has become the flagship event of the OYL

Summer Fling locations

Year	Location	Region
2002	Wilfrid Laurier University	South Central Region
2003	University of Ottawa	Eastern Region
2004	McMaster University	South Central Region
2005	University of Western Ontario	Southwest Region
2006	Trent University	Central East Region
2007	Nipissing University	Northern Region
2008	University of Guelph	South Central Region
2009	Brock University	South Central Region
2010	Queen's University	Eastern Region
2011	Laurentian University	Northern Region
2012	Wilfrid Laurier University	South Central Region
2013	Carleton University	Eastern Region
2014	Joint Summer Fling and AGM, held in King City	Central North Region
2015	Nipissing University	Northern Region
2016	Queen's University	Eastern Region
2019	Carleton University	Eastern Region
2023	University of Toronto	Toronto (E/D/EY) Region
2024	Carleton University	Eastern Region
2025	University of Ottawa	Eastern Region
2026	Western University	Southwest Region
