= Etobicoke Lakeshore =

Etobicoke—Lakeshore may refer to:

- Etobicoke—Lakeshore (federal electoral district), federal riding in Toronto, Ontario, Canada
- Etobicoke—Lakeshore (provincial electoral district), provincial riding in Toronto, Ontario, Canada
- Ward 3 Etobicoke—Lakeshore, municipal ward in Toronto, Ontario, Canada
