= Justin Di Ciano =

Canadian politician

Toronto City Councillor for Ward 5 (Etobicoke—Lakeshore)
- In office December 1, 2014 – December 1, 2018
- Preceded by: James Maloney
- Succeeded by: Mark Grimes

Personal details
- Occupation: Real Estate Investment Manager

Justin Di Ciano (/ˌdɪtʃiˈænoʊ/ DITCH-ee-AN-oh, Italian: [di ˈtʃaːno]) is a Canadian politician, who represented former Ward 5 (Etobicoke—Lakeshore) on Toronto City Council as a councillor for the years 2014–2018.

== Early career ==
Di Ciano worked as a manager for Gross Securities, a Toronto real estate investment firm, and was active in the community as a cofounder of the Jean Augustine Centre for Young Women's Empowerment and as a director of the Toronto Ribfest.

== Political career ==
Di Ciano first ran for Ward 5 in the 2010 election, losing narrowly to incumbent councillor Peter Milczyn.

Again, running in Ward 5 for the 2014 Toronto municipal election, Di Ciano won the popular vote, beating out runner-up Kinga Surma who later ran and won as an MPP in the 2018 Ontario general election.

On March 8, 2018, the Toronto Star first reported that Di Ciano was being investigated by the OPP's anti-racket's branch, known for investigating enterprise crime and complex fraud, for "potential violations of the Municipal Elections Act." On November 16, 2018, the OPP charged Di Ciano along with Mark Grimes for allegedly filing false campaign expenses for the 2014 municipal elections, contrary to the Municipal Elections Act. On February 24, 2020, the charge was withdrawn by the Crown prosecutor. Assistant Crown attorney Michael Wilson told the media in possession of evidence to suggest that, during the 2014 Toronto municipal election, the campaign of Justin Di Ciano received the benefit of polling data from a company called Campaign Research that was not claimed on his financial statement-auditor's report" but “the Crown is not in a position to prove beyond a reasonable doubt that Justin Di Ciano personally requested or received this data or that he deliberately failed to report the receipt of that data when filing”.

As a result of the ward boundary changes imposed on the City of Toronto by the Ontario Provincial Government in 2018 Ward 5 and Ward 6 were consolidated to make a new larger Ward 3. DiCiano announced he would not seek re-election in the larger new Ward during the 2018 Toronto municipal election.

== Electoral record ==
=== 2014 ===
2014 Toronto election, Ward 5
Candidate	Votes	%
Justin Di Ciano	15,362	54.2
Kinga Surma	3,936	13.9
Guy Bowie	2,744	9.7
Walter Melnyk	1,399	4.9
Raymond Desilets	1,365	4.8
Tony D'Aversa	1,307	4.6
Nikola Samac	1,019	3.6
Magda Chelminska	645	2.3
George Lehto	565	1.9
Total	28,342	100

=== 2010 ===
2010 Toronto election, Ward 5
Candidate	Votes	%
Peter Milczyn	9,778	41.2
Justin Di Ciano	9,669	40.7
Morley Kells	2,725	11.5
John Chiappetta	1,245	5.2
Rob Therrien	339	1.4
Total	23,756	100
