= Alastair Gillespie =

Canadian politician (1922–2018)

The Honourable Alastair William Gillespie PC OC

Member of the Canadian Parliament for Etobicoke
- In office June 25, 1968 – May 21, 1979
- Preceded by: District was created in 1966.
- Succeeded by: District was abolished in 1976.

Personal details
- Born: May 1, 1922 Victoria, British Columbia, Canada
- Died: August 19, 2018 (aged 96) Toronto, Ontario, Canada
- Party: Liberal
- Children: 2

Alastair William Gillespie, PC OC (May 1, 1922 – August 19, 2018) was a Canadian politician and businessman.

Gillespie was born in Victoria, British Columbia, the son of Errol Pilkington Gillespie and Catherine Beatrice (Oliver) Gillespie.

He attended Brentwood College School where he was an avid rugby player. He received a Bachelor of Commerce degree from McGill University in 1947 and a Masters of Arts from Oxford University as a Rhodes Scholar in 1949. He later received a Master of Commerce from the University of Toronto in 1958.

Gillespie worked at educational publisher W.J. Gage & Co from 1949 to 1970, beginning in warehouse operations and finishing as director and vice president.

During World War II, Gillespie served in Europe as a pilot in the Canadian Fleet Air Arm and was a Lieutenant in the Royal Canadian Navy from 1941 to 1945.

He was elected to the House of Commons of Canada as a Liberal Member of Parliament (MP) for the Toronto area riding of Etobicoke in the 1968 election. He was re-elected in the 1972 and 1974 elections. His district was divided by electoral redistribution in 1976, which took effect at the election of 1979. He ran in 1979, losing to Progressive Conservative candidate Michael Wilson in Etobicoke Centre.

Gillespie held various ministerial positions in Prime Minister Pierre Elliot Trudeau's government, including: Minister of Industry, Trade and Commerce; Minister of Energy, Mines and Resources; Minister of State for Science and Technology; and Parliamentary Secretary to the President of the Treasury Board. He is one of the longest-serving Privy Counsellors of the Queen's Privy Council for Canada, having been nominated to that body in 1971 by Prime Minister Trudeau.

In 1998, he was made an Officer of the Order of Canada.

Gillespie was director and chairman of Creemore Springs Brewery from 1996 to 2005. He was director of the Canadian Opera Company from 1981 to 1993 and president from 1986 to 1988. A member of the Campaign for Scottish Studies at the University of Guelph, he was named 2003 Scot of the Year by the Scottish Studies Society. In 2010, he was awarded the office of Honorary President of the Champlain Society for his support of the advancement of knowledge of Canadian history through the publication and study of primary records.

Alastair Gillespie was married to Diana Christie Gillespie (Clark, d. 2010) and has two children, Ian Gillespie and Cynthia Webb. He is the grandfather of former Canadian professional tennis player, Olympian, NCAA Division I women's tennis champion and Duke University Athletics Hall of Fame member Vanessa Webb. He died in August 2018 at the age of 96.

== Bibliography ==
- Gillespie, Alastair W. and Irene Sage, Made in Canada: A Businessman's Adventures in Politics, Robin Brass Studio, 2010.

== Archives ==
There is an Alastair Gillespie fonds at Library and Archives Canada.

== Electoral record ==
1979 Canadian federal election: Etobicoke Centre
Party	Candidate	Votes	%
Progressive Conservative	Michael Wilson	31,498	51.3
Liberal	Alastair Gillespie	23,141	37.7
New Democratic	Dan Shipley	6,237	10.2
Libertarian	Norman R. Andersen	272	0.4
Communist	Nick Hrynchyshyn	112	0.2
Independent	Helen Obadia	54	0.1
Marxist–Leninist	James H. Reid	38	0.1
Total valid votes		61,352	100.0
