= Kinga Surma =

Canadian politician

The Honourable Kinga Surma ECO MPP
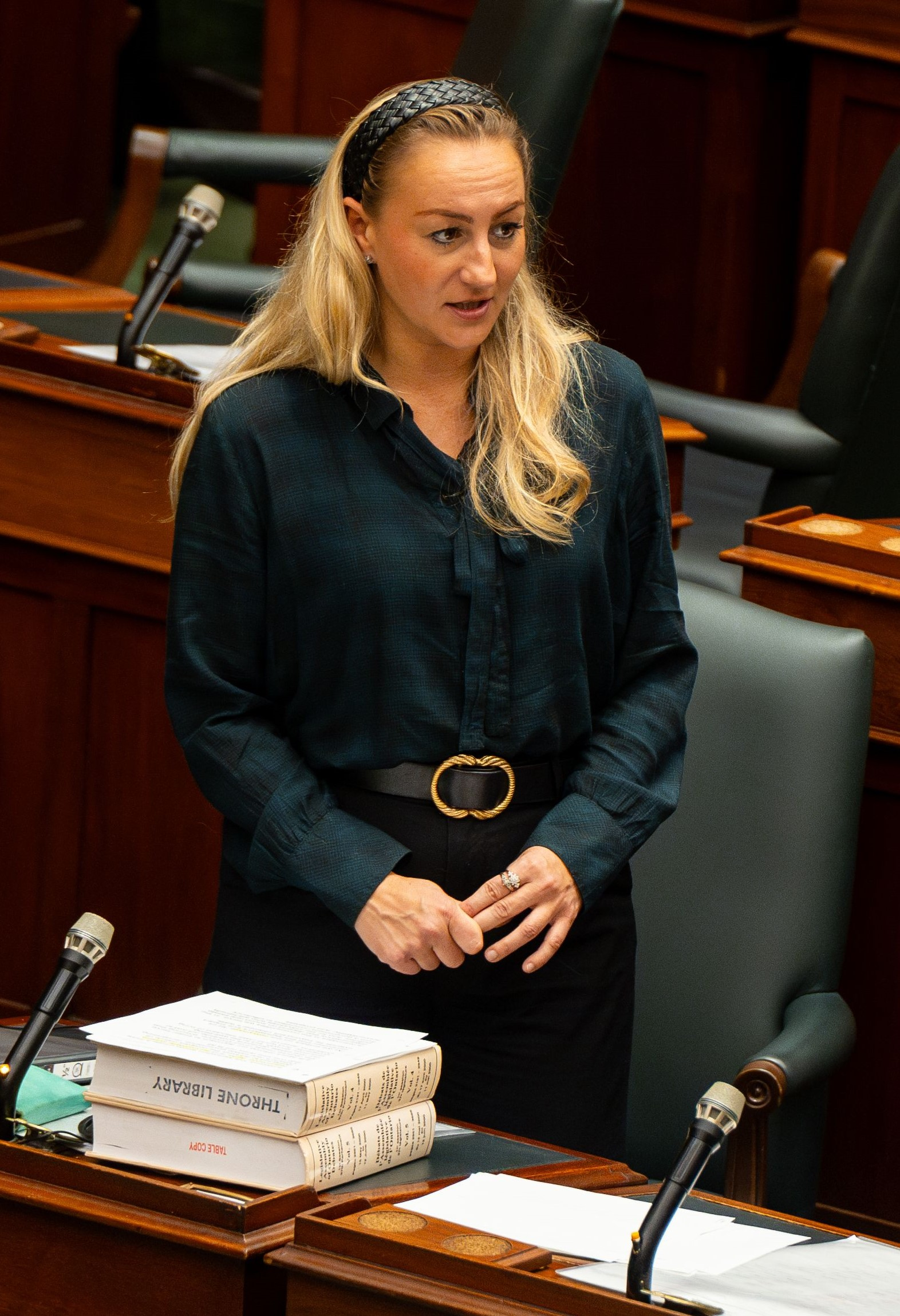

President of the Treasury Board of Ontario
- Incumbent
- Assumed office September 10, 2026
- Premier: Doug Ford
- Preceded by: Peter Bethlenfalvy

Ontario Minister of Infrastructure
- In office June 18, 2021 – September 10, 2026
- Premier: Doug Ford
- Preceded by: Laurie Scott
- Succeeded by: David Piccini

Associate Minister of Transportation for the Greater Toronto Area
- In office June 20, 2019 – June 18, 2021
- Premier: Doug Ford
- Preceded by: Position established
- Succeeded by: Stan Cho

Member of the Ontario Provincial Parliament for Etobicoke Centre
- Incumbent
- Assumed office June 7, 2018
- Preceded by: Yvan Baker

Personal details
- Born: Poland
- Party: Progressive Conservative
- Children: 1
- Education: University of Guelph; Ryerson University

Kinga Surma (born c. 1987/1988) is a Canadian politician and the president of the Treasury Board of Ontario since Septemeber 10, 2026. She represents the riding of Etobicoke Centre in the Legislative Assembly of Ontario as a member of the Progressive Conservative Party. She was previously Ontario minister of infrastructure from 2021 until 2026 and the associate minister of transportation from 2019 to 2021.

== Life and education ==
Surma was born in Poland and moved with her family to Canada when she was four years old. She was raised in Ottawa.

Surma attended the University of Guelph where she studied Public Policy, Business and Commerce. She spent a year in France studying Economics. After graduation, Surma relocated to Toronto.

Surma welcomed her first child, a daughter, in 2025.

== Political career ==
Surma worked for former Toronto City Councillor Peter Milczyn, and at the same time was the President for the Etobicoke-Lakeshore Progressive Conservative Party of Ontario (PC) riding association. Surma worked on the Etobicoke—Lakeshore 2013 by-election for PC candidate. Following the election she was fired from her job at Toronto City Hall.

Surma ran for City Councillor in Ward 5 in the 2014 Toronto municipal election and placed second with 13.9% of the vote.

=== 2018 Ontario general election ===
Surma won the contested PC nomination in the riding of Etobicoke Centre in November 2016. It was alleged that then former City Councillor Doug Ford intimidated her opponent in favour of Surma. Further controversies regarding the election followed as Ford was accused of breaking party rules by purchasing party memberships to secure voters for the election of Surma. This came after the release of an audio recording of Ford recruiting members with Surma, claiming memberships are free despite voting being only open to party members who pay a membership fee. PC party chair Walied Soliman cleared Ford of wrongdoing in 2018.

Surma ran in the 2018 Ontario general election and won her riding of Etobicoke Centre with 42.67% of the vote.

=== Member of Provincial Parliament ===
Surma presented her first successful motion in her first year in government in support of the Toronto Catholic School Board's International Languages Program (ILP). In 2019 a nepotism scandal drew criticism from within the Conservative Party when it came to light her father, Miroslaw Surma, was working a policy adviser to Economic Development Minister Vic Fedeli.

Surma sought funding for a new Toronto Catholic District School Board school in her riding. On August 27, 2020 she announced provincial funding to replace the Buttonwood hill school. On October 30, 2020 she announced a $26.4 million investment to build a new Catholic Secondary School in Etobicoke Centre and $36 million of funding for the refurbishment of Bishop Allen Academy.

In the summer of 2022, Surma worked with Polish-Canadian residents in Toronto to successfully preserve the Polish Festival on Roncesvalles Ave after the local Business Improvement Association proposed to change the naming of the festival excluding "Polish" into the festival. Surma and residents gained support from the Polish Government demanding the BIA to preserve the Polish name, and Polish heritage of the festival on Roncesvalles Ave.

=== Associate Minister of Transportation (GTA) ===
On June 27, 2019, Surma was appointed as the Associate Minister of Transportation (GTA). She is the youngest female member of Executive Council of Ontario. The same year, she spoke in favour of expanding subways in the Greater Toronto Area. She also spoke in favour of expanding the provincial GO Transit rail network to provide two-way, all-day service on key segments of the network. In 2020, during COVID-19 pandemic, Surma introduced legislation to fast track construction on the province's new subway projects. This legislation also introduced the province's new Transit Oriented Communities program which would allow the government to enter into new commercial agreement with partners to integrate transit in communities by building it closer to housing complexes, and downtown cores. On April 26, 2021 Surma introduced the Moving Ontarians More Safely Act regulating road safety, street racing, stunt driving.

=== Minister of Infrastructure ===
Surma was appointed Minister of Infrastructure on June 18, 2021, during a cabinet shuffle, replacing Laurie Scott.

In June 2022 Surma's role as infrastructure Minister expanded to handle the province's real estate portfolios and managing provincial land assets including, the completion of the Ontario Place Redevelopment.

In March 2024 Surma's role as Infrastructure Minister expanded as The Ministry became responsible for managing The Province's Transit Oriented Communities Program.

In October 2024 the NDP filed a complaint against Surma for "a pattern of preferential treatment" in the redevelopment of Ontario Place. In December 2024 she drew further criticism from Liberal, NDP and Green leaders when an Auditor General's report revealed the cost to redevelop Ontario Place would be $2 billion, almost six times what the government had initially said. In January 2025, Ontario's Integrity Commissioner, J. David Wake, determined there was insufficient grounds to conduct an investigation against Surma because "Minister Surma was not the minister responsible for the majority of the period under scrutiny related to the project and the agreement with Therme."

In June 2024 Surma ordered the closure of the Ontario Science Center, after the Provincial Government found that there are a number of roof panels “in a distressed, high-risk condition” that could fail under the weight of snow this winter. The type of roofing panel, prevalent on the Science Centre buildings, has been found to be failing in other jurisdictions, prompting Ontario officials to take a closer look. In December 2024, Ontario's Auditor General reported that a new Science Centre would be built by 2029 as part of the Ontario Place Redevelopment.

In November 2024, Surma announced a $100 million deal with Elon Musk's Starlink to provide internet to 15,000 homes in Northern Ontario. Surma has overseen the expansion of Ontario's broadband internet expansion to all rural and Northern Ontario communities, which is slated to be completed by 2025. In March 2025, in response to economic tariffs imposed on Canada by President Donald Trump, Premier Doug Ford announced the immediate cancellation of the $100 million deal with Starlink.

== Election results ==
2025 Ontario general election: Etobicoke Centre
Party	Candidate	Votes	%	±%
Progressive Conservative	Kinga Surma	22,261	48.10	–0.49
Liberal	John Campbell	19,358	41.83	+7.78
New Democratic	Giulia Volpe	2,151	4.65	–3.96
Green	Brian Morris	1,000	2.16	–2.33
New Blue	Mario Bilusic	658	1.42	–1.04
Canadians' Choice	Paul Fromm	479	1.04	–
None of the Above	Richard M. Kiernicki	192	0.41	–0.02
Special Needs	Signe Miranda	180	0.39	–
Total valid votes		46,279	99.40	
Total rejected, unmarked and declined ballots		280	0.60	–0.04
Turnout		46,559	48.11	–0.43
Eligible voters		96,769		
Progressive Conservative hold		Swing		–4.13
Source: Elections Ontario

2022 Ontario general election: Etobicoke Centre
Party	Candidate	Votes	%	±%	Expenditures
Progressive Conservative	Kinga Surma	22,035	48.59	+5.59	$108,722
Liberal	Noel Semple	15,443	34.05	–0.63	$75,529
New Democratic	Heather Vickers-Wong	3,906	8.61	–9.53	$8,484
Green	Brian Maclean	2,036	4.49	+2.15	$1,932
New Blue	Cathy Habus	1,117	2.46	–	$3,160
Ontario Party	Mitchell Gilboy	530	1.17	–	$0
None of the Above	Richard M. Kiernicki	198	0.44	–	$0
Moderate	Genadij Zaitsev	86	0.19	–	$0
Total valid votes		45,351	99.36	–	$131,634
Total rejected, unmarked and declined ballots		294	0.64	–0.35	
Turnout		45,645	48.55	–13.36	
Eligible voters		94,024			
Progressive Conservative hold		Swing		▲3.11	
Source: Elections Ontario

2018 Ontario general election: Etobicoke Centre
Party	Candidate	Votes	%	±%
Progressive Conservative	Kinga Surma	24,432	43.00	+10.58
Liberal	Yvan Baker	19,708	34.68	–14.02
New Democratic	Erica Kelly	10,311	18.15	+6.63
Green	Shawn Rizvi	1,329	2.34	–0.29
Canadians' Choice	Paul Fromm	631	1.11	–
Libertarian	Basil Mummery	252	0.44	–
Independent	Wallace Richards	162	0.29	–
Total valid votes		56,825	99.00	
Total rejected, unmarked and declined ballots		573	1.00	–0.42
Turnout		57,398	61.91	+5.43
Eligible voters		92,715		
Progressive Conservative notional gain from Liberal		Swing		+12.30
Source: Elections Ontario

2014 Toronto election, Ward 5
Candidate	Votes	%
Justin Di Ciano	15,362	54.2
Kinga Surma	3,936	13.9
Guy Bowie	2,744	9.7
Walter Melnyk	1,399	4.9
Raymond Desilets	1,365	4.8
Tony D'aversa	1,307	4.6
Nikola Samac	1,019	3.6
Magda Chelminska	645	2.3
George Lehto	565	1.9
Total	28,342	100
