= Ted Opitz =

Canadian politician (born 1961)

Lieutenant-Colonel Ted Opitz CD

Member of Parliament for Etobicoke Centre
- In office May 2, 2011 – August 4, 2015
- Preceded by: Borys Wrzesnewskyj
- Succeeded by: Borys Wrzesnewskyj

Personal details
- Born: August 25, 1961 (age 65) Toronto, Ontario, Canada
- Party: Conservative
- Spouse: Cynthia
- Profession: Soldier, political advisor

Military service
- Allegiance: Canada
- Branch/service: Canadian Army
- Years of service: 1978–2011
- Rank: Lieutenant-Colonel
- Battles/wars: Bosnian War
- Awards: See list

Ted J. Opitz, CD (born August 25, 1961) is a Canadian politician and a retired Canadian Forces Lieutenant-Colonel who represented the Toronto riding of Etobicoke Centre as a member of the Conservative Party of Canada in the House of Commons of Canada from 2011 to 2015.

== Background ==
Opitz was born in the Parkdale area of Toronto in 1961 and is the youngest of four children. Opitz's parents were originally from Poland and immigrated to Canada shortly after World War II.

In 1978, Opitz enrolled as a private in the Canadian Army Reserves and rose to the rank of Lieutenant-Colonel during 33 years of service. In 1998 and early 1999, he served in Bosnia as a member of NATO's Stabilisation Force in Bosnia and Herzegovina (SFOR). During his military career, he performed various roles ranging from Assistant to the Chief of Staff at Canadian Forces College, a course instructor and military planner for Pope John Paul II and his World Youth Day visit to Canada in 2002. Prior to running and being elected to Parliament, Opitz was the Commanding Officer of The Lincoln and Welland Regiment.

During his military service, Opitz also had parallel careers in the telecom industry, as well as completing a BA in English at York University. Starting as a technician, Opitz worked his way up to sales and marketing and managerial roles in product management and high speed internet development.

In June 2008, Opitz was one of three candidates for the Conservative nomination in Mississauga South, losing to financial consultant Hugh Arrison.

Previously, Opitz was the senior regional advisor for two years to Jason Kenney, Minister of Citizenship, Immigration and Multiculturalism. In that role, he represented the Government of Canada and the Minister in the Greater Toronto Area and Southern Ontario.

In Etobicoke, Opitz has been recognized for his volunteer work with the Polish community and youth in the region. Opitz has lived in Etobicoke Centre with his wife Cynthia since 1994 and was elected as the Member of Parliament in May 2011, serving until 2015.

== Politics ==
Opitz was elected in 2011 federal election. He won by a margin of 26 votes over Liberal incumbent Borys Wrzesnewskyj in the initial count, triggering an automatic judicial recount. The recount confirmed his win but was later declared null and void on May 18, 2012, due to alleged irregularities in the voting registration process. However, Opitz appealed the decision to the Supreme Court of Canada, which reversed the lower court's ruling and upheld the original election result on October 25, 2012.

As a Member of Parliament, Opitz sat on the Standing Committee on Veterans Affairs and the Standing Committee on Procedure and House Affairs. In February 2012, Opitz was chosen as a delegate to represent the Parliament of Canada at both the Standing Committee of Parliamentarians of the Arctic Region and at the 56th Conference on the UN Commission on the Status of Women. He also is a vice-chairman of the Canada-Poland Parliamentary Friendship Association and chair of the Canada-Ukraine Parliamentary Friendship Group.

In 2013, Opitz acknowledged in an agreement with Elections Canada that his 2008 nomination donations violated the Canada Elections Act.

Opitz was one of thirteen Canadians banned from travelling to Russia under sanctions imposed by Russian president Vladimir Putin in March 2014. He replied via his official Twitter account, "Today's sanctions by Russia on myself and colleagues demonstrate Canada has been an effective voice in the world in support of Ukraine."

In the 2015 federal election, Opitz faced Wrzesnewskyj in a rematch of the 2011 contest and was defeated by 9,542 votes.

In the 2019 and 2025 federal elections, Opitz ran in his former riding and finished second to the Liberal candidate, Yvan Baker.

Opitz ran for Toronto City Council in Ward 3 Etobicoke—Lakeshore in the 2026 Toronto municipal election. He finished second to incumbent councillor Amber Morley, receiving 19,494 votes, or 36.97 per cent.

== Electoral record ==
2026 Toronto municipal election, Ward 3 Etobicoke—Lakeshore
Candidate	Votes	%
Amber Morley (X)	25,521	48.40
Ted Opitz	19,494	36.97
Mihaela Andrei	5,329	10.11
Anthony Internicola	2,381	4.52
Source: City of Toronto

2025 Canadian federal election: Etobicoke Centre
Party	Candidate	Votes	%	±%	Expenditures
Liberal	Yvan Baker	36,186	53.6	+5.5	
Conservative	Ted Opitz	29,713	44.0	+9.9	
New Democratic	Ji Won Jung	1,611	2.4	–8.4	
Total valid votes/expense limit		67,510	99.2		
Total rejected ballots		556	0.8		
Turnout		68,066	69.4	+5.8	
Eligible voters		98,074			
Liberal hold		Swing		–1.93	
Source: Elections Canada

2019 Canadian federal election: Etobicoke Centre
Party	Candidate	Votes	%	±%	Expenditures
Liberal	Yvan Baker	32,800	51.9	-0.87	$98,039.05
Conservative	Ted Opitz	21,804	34.5	-2.83	$100,790.81
New Democratic	Heather Vickers-Wong	4,881	7.7	-0.21	$8,510.54
Green	Cameron Semple	2,775	4.4	+3.01	none listed
People's	Nicholas Serdiuk	664	1.1	-	none listed
Libertarian	Mark Wrzesniewski	295	0.5	-	none listed
Total valid votes/expense limit		63,219	100.0		
Total rejected ballots		624			
Turnout		63,843	69.5		
Eligible voters		91,889			
Liberal hold		Swing		+0.98	
Source: Elections Canada

2015 Canadian federal election: Etobicoke Centre
Party	Candidate	Votes	%	±%	Expenditures
Liberal	Borys Wrzesnewskyj	32,612	52.77	+12.21	$183,159.14
Conservative	Ted Opitz	23,070	37.33	-4.53	$123,382.55
New Democratic	Tanya De Mello	4,886	7.91	-6.72	$86,715.88
Green	Shawn Rizvi	856	1.39	-1.30	–
Progressive Canadian	Rob Wolvin	378	0.61		–
Total valid votes/expense limit		61,802	100.00		$226,574.91
Total rejected ballots		303	0.49		
Turnout		62,105	71.03		
Eligible voters		87,440			
Liberal gain from Conservative		Swing		+8.37	
Source: Elections Canada

2011 Canadian federal election: Etobicoke Centre
Party	Candidate	Votes	%	±%	Expenditures
Conservative	Ted Opitz	21,644	41.2%	+3.7%	–
Liberal	Borys Wrzesnewskyj	21,618	41.2%	-7.7%	–
New Democratic	Ana Maria Rivero	7,735	14.7%	+6.4%	–
Green	Katarina Zoricic	1,377	2.6%	-2.8%	–
Marxist–Leninist	Sarah Thompson	149	0.3%		–
Total valid votes/expense limit		52,523	100.0		–
Total rejected ballots		271	0.51	+0.02	
Turnout		52,794	65.49	+3.8	
Eligible voters		80,603			

== Honours and decorations ==
Opitz received the following honours and decorations during and after his military career.

- Canadian Government Volunteer Award and United Nations Volunteer Award
- Commanders Commendation for service to World Youth Days 2002
- Received Gold Cross for contributions to the Polish Combatants Association
- Canadian Forces' Decoration with two bars for 32 years military service
- NATO Decoration for service in the former Yugoslavia
- Canadian Peacekeeping Service Medal
- Queen Elizabeth II Golden Jubilee Medal
- Queen Elizabeth II Diamond Jubilee Medal
- Awarded Serving Brother of the Order of St. John
- Pro Memorial Medal (Poland)
- Knight's Cross Order of Merit (Poland)
