= Irene Jones =

Canadian politician

Toronto City Councillor for (Ward 6) Etobicoke-Lakeshore
- In office December 1, 2000 – November 30, 2003
- Preceded by: Riding established
- Succeeded by: Mark Grimes

Toronto City Councillor for (Ward 2) - Lakeshore Queensway
- In office January 1, 1998 – November 30, 2000
- Preceded by: Riding established
- Succeeded by: Riding abolished

Etobicoke City Councillor for Ward 1
- In office December 1, 1988 – December 31, 1997
- Preceded by: Helen Wursta
- Succeeded by: Riding abolished

Personal details
- Occupation: NGO Executive director

Irene Jones is a former municipal councillor in Toronto, Ontario, Canada. A member of the social democratic New Democratic Party, she served on the Etobicoke and Toronto councils from 1988 until 2003, when she stood down to seek election to the provincial legislature.

== Background ==
Jones was the director of Storefront Humber during the 1980s, providing home support services to elderly residents of Etobicoke and Mississauga. Jones, a Mimico resident, also served as chair of Home Share Etobicoke, was a member of the Toronto District Health Council, and helped establish the New Toronto Nursery School.

== Etobicoke councillor ==
Jones first campaigned for the Etobicoke council in 1985. The election night returns showed her losing to her conservative rival, Helen Wursta, by only ten votes. Her requests for a recount were turned down by the city, and a judge ruled in January 1986 that too much time had passed for a court-ordered scrutiny of the votes (although the judge also ruled that the council was certainly aware of ballot irregularities when it turned down Jones's request). In the aftermath of these events, Bob Mitchell of the Toronto Star wrote that the real result of the election would never be known for certain.

She sought election to the Etobicoke council again in 1988, arguing that the city should purchase waterfront properties for recreational use rather than sell them to developers. She was listed as forty-one years old during the campaign. This time, Jones defeated Wursta by an almost two-to-one margin.

Jones was frequently critical of development projects approved by the Etobicoke council. She voted against a high-rise condominium project at Kingsway-on-the-Park, arguing that it set a "dangerous precedent" for the city. She also argued that the redevelopment of the Lakeshore Blvd. area was proceeding at too quick a pace. Jones was especially critical of the council's approach to development issues, saying "While we do planning studies, we frequently don't do financial impact studies. We have to look at the ability of the average taxpayer in Etobicoke (to pay for) the urban responsibility of servicing all the residential redevelopment."

She was also involved in securing a compromise for Etobicoke's motel strip area, promoting affordable housing for the region. In October 1990, Jones endorsed a report from former Mayor of Toronto David Crombie which asserted that the Etobicoke council was placing the interests of developers ahead of the public.

Jones was re-elected without difficulty in 1991, and continued to oppose many of the city's development plans. In 1993, she criticized the prospect of selling land around the old Lakeshore Psychiatric Hospital to private developers. She was re-elected again in 1994. She chaired the city's Board of Health after the election, and supported plans to designate Etobicoke as smoke-free. She supported the Courtyards development project in Long Branch, arguing that the planning and development committee "for the first time" took community concerns into account.

== Toronto councillor ==
The city of Etobicoke was amalgamated into the city of Toronto in 1997. Jones was elected to the new Toronto City Council, winning one of two seats in the Lakeshore-Queensway ward. She sought an appointment as Etobicoke community council chair after the election, but lost to Elizabeth Brown. When committee positions were determined, she was appointed to the Toronto Board of Health and the Urban Environment and Development Committee. Jones quickly emerged as an opponent of Mel Lastman's style of government, arguing that the city's first budget had been created in secret.

She supported the city's plans for redeveloping the motel strip area of Etobicoke in 1998, saying that environmental concerns had been taken into account and that property unit prices had been scaled back to reasonable levels. During the same year, Jones supported calls for increased government funding to combat domestic violence. In 1999, she called for Toronto to be made smoke-free by 2001.

On December 14, 1999, Jones was appointed as a member of Toronto's newly created Food and Hunger Action Committee. She sought a position on the Toronto Police Services Board in 2000, but was passed over in favour of Gordon Chong. Late in 2000, Jones opposed a plan (which was ultimately rejected) to ship Toronto's garbage to the Adams Mine in Kirkland Lake.

Toronto's ward system was restructured prior to the 2000 municipal election. Jones was re-elected without difficulty in the new sixth ward, covering the southern part of Etobicoke—Lakeshore. She was appointed to chair the West Community Council after the election. In late 2001, she spoke out against the city's practice of contracting out services to private firms.

In February 2002, Jones was appointed as the new City of Toronto Water Advocate in a joint program with the federal government. She later criticized a municipal plan (later abandoned) to create an arm's-length board of private citizens to oversee Toronto's water system, arguing that this was simply a means of evading responsibility for necessary rate increases. In October 2002, she announced that she was seeking public input on future cleanup efforts for Toronto's waterfront. Jones also expressed concern, late in the year, that the proposed arm's-length board would be the first step toward contracting out water services to private developers.

Jones was one of the first Toronto city councillors to endorse David Miller's successful bid for mayor of the city, joining him at his campaign launch in January 2003. Jones herself did not seek re-election municipally, choosing instead to campaign for the provincial New Democratic Party in Etobicoke—Lakeshore for the 2003 provincial election. She finished third in this contest, against Liberal candidate Laurel Broten.

== After politics ==
Jones worked in the volunteer sector after the election, and served on a committee organized by the Toronto Region Conservation Authority. In 2004, she joined the lobbying firm Urban Intelligence as a senior consultant. In August 2006, she was listed as co-chair of the Etobicoke-Mimico Watersheds Coalition, fighting for creek preservation and reclamation.
