= Amber Morley =

Canadian politician

Deputy Mayor of Toronto for Etobicoke and York
- Incumbent
- Assumed office August 10, 2023
- Mayor: Olivia Chow
- Preceded by: Stephen Holyday (2022)

Toronto City Councillor for Ward 3 Etobicoke—Lakeshore
- Incumbent
- Assumed office November 15, 2022
- Preceded by: Mark Grimes

Personal details
- Party: Independent

Amber Morley is a Canadian politician who has represented Ward 3 Etobicoke—Lakeshore on Toronto City Council since 2022. She has also served as the deputy mayor of Toronto for Etobicoke and York since 2023.

== Background ==
Prior to her election to council, Morley worked at the LAMP Community Health Centre, and as an administrative assistant to former councillor Peter Milczyn. In 2017, she was a recipient of the Queen Elizabeth II Diamond Jubilee Medal for her work with LAMP.

== Political career ==
Morley ran in the 2018 Toronto municipal election in Ward 3 Etobicoke—Lakeshore, coming in second to Grimes.

She ran again in the 2022 municipal election and was elected. Morley received a number of endorsements from left-wing politicians including Toronto—St. Paul's Councillor Josh Matlow, former New Democratic MP Peggy Nash, as well as Ontario New Democratic MPPs Kristyn Wong-Tam, Bhutila Karpoche and Jill Andrew.

Following the election of Mayor Olivia Chow in 2023, Morley was appointed one of four deputy mayors of Toronto, representing Etobicoke and York.

== Electoral record ==
2026 Toronto municipal election, Ward 3 Etobicoke—Lakeshore
Candidate	Votes	%	minus
Amber Morley (X)	25,521	48.40	1.96 ▲
Ted Opitz	19,494	36.97	–
Mihaela Andrei	5,329	10.11	–
Anthony Internicola	2,381	4.52	–

2022 Toronto municipal election, Ward 3 Etobicoke—Lakeshore
Candidate	Vote	%
Amber Morley	15,271	46.44
Mark Grimes (X)	13,258	40.32
Mary Markovic	2,625	7.98
Marco Valle	644	1.96
Bonnie Hu	618	1.88
Zeynel Ari	467	1.42

2018 Toronto municipal election, Ward 3 Etobicoke—Lakeshore
Candidate	Votes	Percentage
Mark Grimes	16,527	40.90%
Amber Morley	10,985	27.19%
Pamela Gough	7,301	18.07%
Iain Davis	2,722	6.74%
Svitlana Burlakova	1,218	3.01%
Peggy Moulder	575	1.42%
Patrizia Nigro	394	0.98%
Michael Julihen	320	0.79%
Michael Loomans	199	0.49%
Robert Gunnyon	167	0.41%
