= Mark Grimes =

Canadian politician

Mark Andrew Grimes
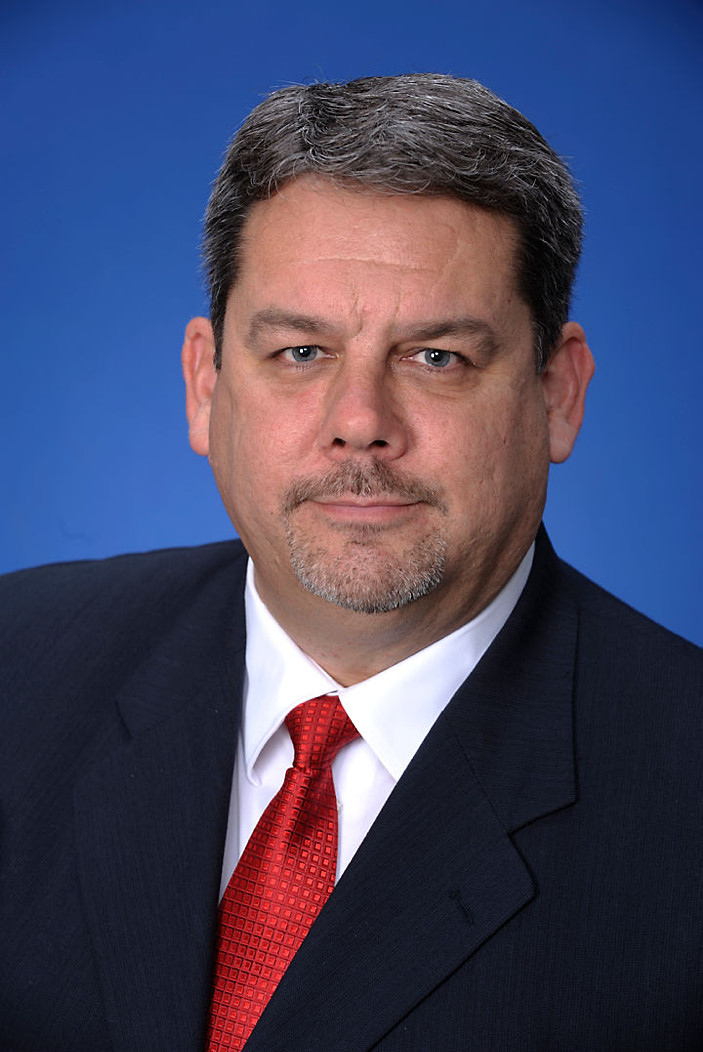
- Grimes in 2010

Toronto City Councillor
- In office December 1, 2003 – November 15, 2022
- Preceded by: Irene Jones
- Succeeded by: Amber Morley
- Constituency: Ward 3 Etobicoke—Lakeshore (2018-2022); Ward 6 Etobicoke—Lakeshore (2003-2018)

Personal details
- Born: June 21, 1961 (age 65) Orillia, Ontario
- Spouse: Anne Grimes
- Children: Jonathan, Colleen, Jake, Reilly, Colin
- Occupation: Politician; Entrepreneur; Sports Administrator

Mark Grimes is a Canadian politician and businessman who served on Toronto City Council from 2003 to 2022. Grimes represented Etobicoke—Lakeshore when it was Ward 6 until 2018 and Ward 3 onwards. He served five consecutive terms on council, representing the Etobicoke—Lakeshore area for almost 20 years.

== Background ==
Grimes was born in Orillia and grew up in New Toronto, a neighbourhood of Toronto where he was a paperboy. Prior to politics, he worked as a trader on the Toronto Stock Exchange before starting his own transportation logistics company, MGA International Logistics. He and his wife Anne raised their five children in Mimico and later moved to Alderwood, where they reside.

== Political Career ==
In 2003, Grimes ran as a municipal councillor in Ward 6 Etobicoke-Lakeshore to replace Irene Jones who left the seat to run in the provincial election. He was one of nine candidates to run for the seat. During the campaign, he and his closest rival Berardo Mascioli, accused each other of dirty tricks during the election campaign. On election night phone lines to both campaign offices were cut. Grimes won the election by 1,352 votes.

In 2005, Grimes was appointed to the Toronto Transit Commission board but he resigned in 2006 due to a conflict with board chair Howard Moscoe. Grimes seconded a motion of non-confidence in Moscoe over his handling of negotiations with the TTC union. When the vote lost, Grimes immediately resigned. He said continuing to serve on the board would be a waste of time. he said, "Obviously my voice isn't going to be heard."

Although Grimes was generally opposed to initiatives supported by Mayor David Miller, he became a key player in getting the land transfer tax passed in 2007. Grimes proposed a compromise that would see rebates for first-time buyers. He said, "I'm not there for the mayor or to play the left wing against the right wing ... Nobody likes new taxes, but I don't want to see libraries and ice rinks and community centres closing."

In 2010, Grimes intervened to prevent a woman from jumping off a bridge in Toronto. He was later awarded a civilian citation by the Toronto Police Service for his actions.

After the 2010 election he was named chair of the Etobicoke-York Community Council. He later served as Chair of the Exhibition Place Board of Governors, where he oversaw developments on the grounds including the construction of Hotel X Toronto.

Grimes was also involved in sports and major event initiatives in Toronto, contributing to projects such as the development of BMO Field and the establishment of the Ford Performance Centre (formerly the MasterCard Centre), a four-pad arena used by the Greater Toronto Hockey League, the Toronto Marlies, and the Toronto Maple Leafs, as well as the OVO Athletic Centre, a training facility for the Toronto Raptors. He served as chair of the Mayor’s Pan American Games Secretariat and was involved in the planning of the 2015 Pan and Parapan American Games. He also moved the motion and led Toronto’s successful bid to host matches during the 2026 FIFA World Cup.

He has served on a number of boards and committees, including the Hockey Hall of Fame, where he was a member of the Board of Directors for 20 years, as well as the Canada's Sports Hall of Fame, and the Toronto Argonauts Foundation.

Grimes was inducted into the Etobicoke Sports Hall of Fame in 2017 in the Builder category.

On November 16, 2018, the OPP charged Grimes along with outgoing city councillor Justin Di Ciano for allegedly filing false campaign expenses for the 2014 municipal elections, contrary to the Municipal Elections Act. On February 10, 2020, Grimes was cleared of the non-criminal charge under the Municipal Elections Act.

Grimes was narrowly defeated in the 2022 Toronto municipal election by Amber Morley, four years after she lost to Grimes in the 2018 Toronto municipal election. Grimes had been endorsed by Mayor John Tory both times.

Grimes served as Commissioner of the Ontario Junior A Lacrosse League from 2021 to 2025.

In 2025, Grimes was awarded the King Charles III Coronation Medal in recognition of his contributions to Ontario and Canada.

== Election results ==
2022 Toronto municipal election, Ward 3 Etobicoke—Lakeshore
Candidate	Vote	%
Amber Morley	15,271	46.44
Mark Grimes (x)	13,258	40.32
Mary Markovic	2,625	7.98
Marco Valle	644	1.96
Bonnie Hu	618	1.88
Zeynel Ari	467	1.42

2018 Toronto election, Ward 3
Candidate	Votes	%
(x)Mark Grimes	16,527	40.90%
Amber Morley	10,985	27.19%
Pamela Gough	7,301	18.07%
Iain Davis	2,722	6.74%
Svitlana Burlakova	1,218	3.01%
Peggy Moulder	575	1.42%
Patrizia Nigro	394	0.98%
Michael Julihen	320	0.79%
Michael Loomans	199	0.49%
Robert Gunnyon	167	0.41%

2014 Toronto election, Ward 6
Candidate	Votes	%
Mark Grimes	11337	43.96
Russ Ford	8791	34.08
Tony Vella	2718	10.54
Miroslaw Jankielewicz	1114	4.32
Sean O'Callaghan	501	1.94
Peggy Moulder	398	1.54
Michael Laxer	305	1.18
Everett Sheppard	221	0.86
Ruthmary James	169	0.66
Robert Sysak	90	0.35
John Letonja	84	0.33
Dave Searle	64	0.25
Total	25,792	100.00

2010 Toronto election, Ward 6
Candidate	Votes	%
Mark Grimes	12,228	60.4
Jem Cain	5,847	28.9
Michael Laxer	717	3.5
Wendell Brereton	605	3.0
Cecilia Luu	466	2.3
David Searle	375	1.9
Total	20,238	100%

2006 Toronto election, Ward 6
Candidate	Votes	%
Mark Grimes	6,472	42.6
Jem Cain	3,758	24.7
Matthew Day	2,327	15.3
Gregory Wowchuk	931	6.1
Danuta Markiewicz	531	3.5
Rosalie Chalmers	424	2.8
Walter Melnyk	309	2.0
Tony Del Grande	303	2.0
George Kash	131	0.9

2003 Toronto election, Ward 6
Candidate	Votes	%
Mark Grimes	5,334	32.4
Berardo Mascioli	3,982	24.2
Jerry Smith	3,437	20.9
Diane Cleary	1,180	7.2
Mark Selkirk	1,079	6.6
Gregory Wowchuk	893	5.4
George Kash	208	1.3
Frederick Azman	174	1.1
David Searle	94	0.6
Robin Vinden	83	0.5
