= Etobicoke (federal electoral district) =

Ontario electoral district
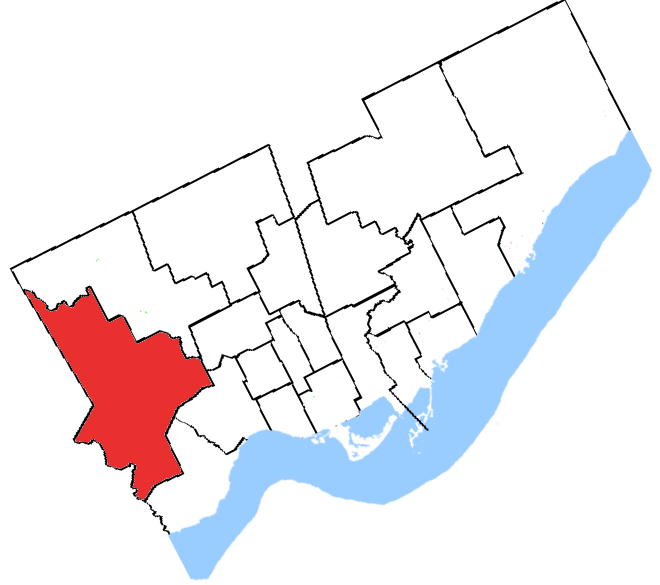
- Etobicoke in relation to other Metro Toronto ridings

Defunct federal electoral district
- Legislature: House of Commons
- District created: 1966
- District abolished: 1976
- First contested: 1968
- Last contested: 1974

Etobicoke was a federal electoral district represented in the House of Commons of Canada from 1968 to 1979. It was located in the province of Ontario. This riding was created in 1966 from parts of York—Humber riding.

It consisted of that part of Metropolitan Toronto bounded as follows: from the intersection of Dundas Street West and Jane Street, north along Jane Street, west along Eglinton Avenue West, northwest along the Humber River, west along Dixon Side Road, north along Islington Avenue North, west along Rexdale Boulevard, north along Kipling Avenue North, northwest along the West Branch of the Humber River, south along the boundary between the Townships of Etobicoke and Toronto, northeast along the Queen Elizabeth Way, north along Kipling Avenue South, and northeast along Dundas Street West to Jane Street.

The electoral district was abolished in 1976 when it was redistributed between Etobicoke Centre, Etobicoke North, Etobicoke—Lakeshore, York South—Weston and York West ridings.

== Members of Parliament ==
This riding has elected the following members of Parliament:

Parliament	Years	Member	Party
Riding created from York—Humber
28th	1968–1972	Alastair Gillespie	Liberal
29th	1972–1974	Alastair Gillespie	Liberal
30th	1974–1979	Alastair Gillespie	Liberal
Riding dissolved into Etobicoke Centre, Etobicoke North, Etobicoke—Lakeshore, York South—Weston and York West

== Election results ==
1968 Canadian federal election
Party	Candidate	Votes	%
Liberal	Alastair Gillespie	32,066	55.96
Progressive Conservative	Arthur Harnett	17,799	31.06
New Democratic	Robert Sydney Young	7,432	12.97
Total valid votes		57,297	100.00

1972 Canadian federal election
Party	Candidate	Votes	%	±%
Liberal	Alastair Gillespie	32,008	44.82	-11.14
Progressive Conservative	John van den Heuvel	28,896	40.46	+9.40
New Democratic	Dave H. Hammond	10,299	14.42	+1.45
Independent	Howard Ramson	214	0.30	–
Total valid votes		71,417	100.00	

1974 Canadian federal election
Party	Candidate	Votes	%	±%
Liberal	Alastair Gillespie	37,847	51.34	+6.52
Progressive Conservative	John Thomson	28,193	38.24	-2.22
New Democratic	Denis Prinold	7,337	9.95	-4.47
Communist	Nicholas Hrynchyshyn	181	0.25	–
Marxist–Leninist	Barbara Biley	166	0.23	–
Total valid votes		73,724	100.00	

== See also ==
- List of Canadian federal electoral districts
- Historical federal electoral districts of Canada
