= Borys Wrzesnewskyj =

Canadian politician

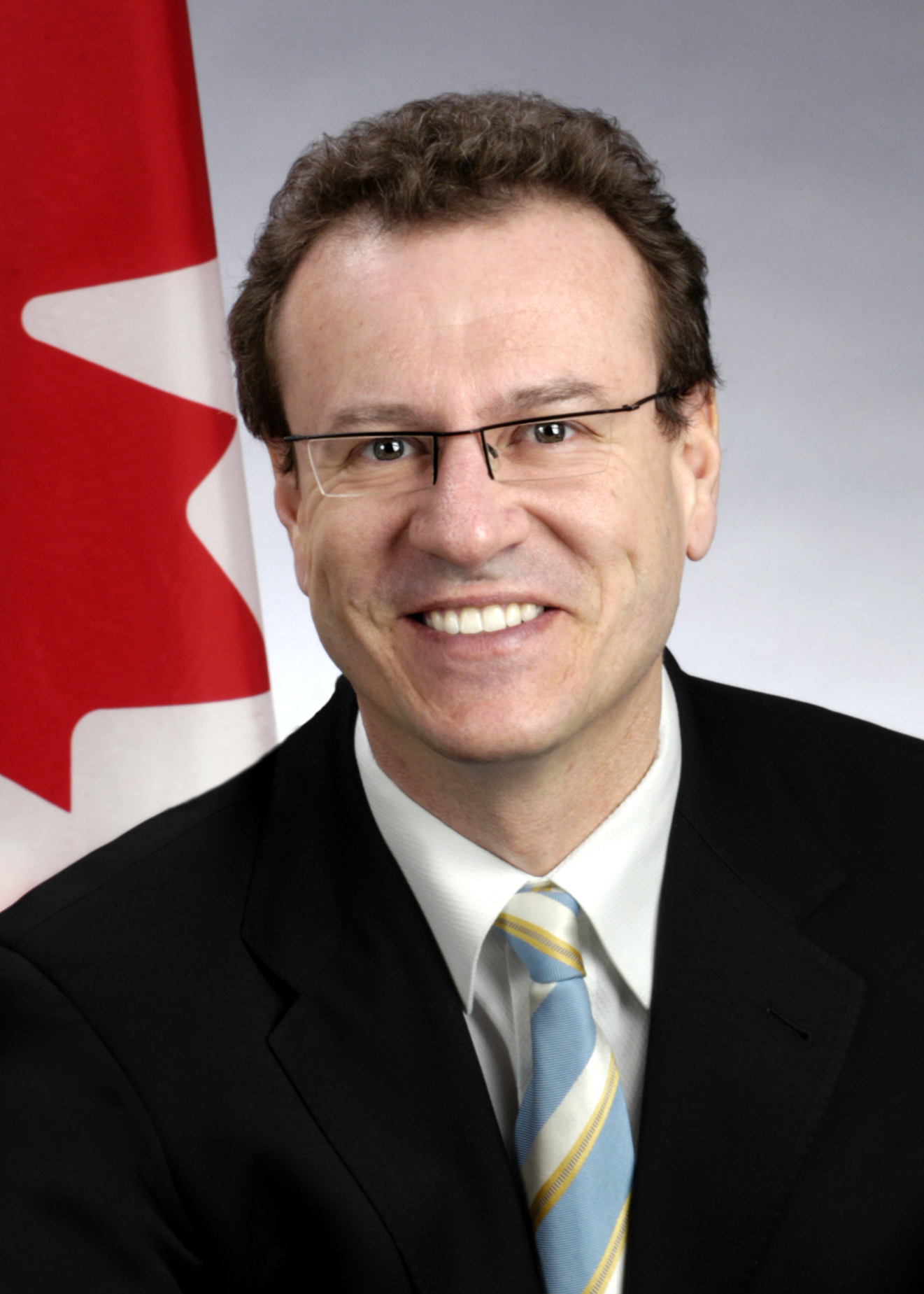

Member of Parliament for Etobicoke Centre
- In office October 19, 2015 – September 11, 2019
- Preceded by: Ted Opitz
- Succeeded by: Yvan Baker
- In office June 28, 2004 – May 2, 2011
- Preceded by: Allan Rock
- Succeeded by: Ted Opitz

Chairman of the Standing Committee on Citizenship and Immigration
- In office February 16, 2016 – September 18, 2017
- Minister: John McCallum
- Preceded by: David Tilson

Personal details
- Born: November 10, 1960 (age 66) Etobicoke, Ontario, Canada
- Party: Liberal
- Education: Trinity College, Toronto
- Profession: Businessman

Borys Wrzesnewskyj (/ˈbɔːrɪs fʃɪsˈnɛfski/ BOR-iss fshiss-NEF-skee; (Note: Polish: [ˈbɔrɨz vʐɛsˈnɛfskʲi]; Ukrainian: Борис Вжесневський [boˈrɪs u̯ʒesˈnɛu̯sʲkɪj]. Polish Borys is pronounced [ˈbɔrɨs] in isolation.) born November 10, 1960) is a Canadian politician who represented the riding of Etobicoke Centre in the House of Commons of Canada. A member of the Liberal Party of Canada, he was first elected in the 2004 federal election, and was reelected in 2006 and 2008, before being defeated in 2011. Wrzesnewskyj unsuccessfully challenged the results of his 2011 in a Supreme Court of Canada case. He was returned to parliament in the 2015 federal election and declined to run in the 2019 election.

== Early life and career ==
Wrzesnewskyj was born in Etobicoke, Ontario, Canada (now a part of Toronto). He is a third-generation Ukrainian Canadian, of the Ukrainian Catholic Church, and partly Polish from paternal family. He attended Humber Valley Village Public School and Upper Canada College. He received a Bachelor of Commerce from Trinity College, University of Toronto and has been a member of Plast. He speaks English, Ukrainian, Polish, French, and Spanish. He is the owner of Future Bakery, founded by his grandparents, and M-C Dairy.

== Member of Parliament (2004–2011) ==
Wrzesnewskyj was involved in the Canadian delegation to the contested Ukrainian election of 2004, Orange Revolution, and has often spoken to Canadian media on its behalf. Then, Canadian prime minister, Paul Martin said that he was personally briefed by him to publicly warn Russian president Vladimir Putin "hands off the Ukrainian election" in the House of Commons of Canada which fundamentally shifted Canada's position (Wrzesnewskyj telephoned Martin from Kyiv during the Orange Revolution). Originally, the Department of Foreign Affairs and International Trade in Ottawa took a "hands off" approach to the contested Ukrainian election. Martin says that he, and the Government of Canada would not have stood up for democracy in Ukraine "if it hadn't been for Borys". Subsequently, he helped secure the Government of Canada's commitment to sending five hundred Canadian election observers to the December 2004 Presidential elections in Ukraine.

=== Legislative work ===
His House of Commons legislative work saw the introduction of several private member's bills and motions including:

- Bill C-180, "An Act to amend the Criminal Code (hate propaganda)", 6 May 2009; Bill C-181, "An Act to amend the Criminal Code (trafficking and transplanting human organs and other body parts)", 7 May 2009.
- Bill C-383, "An Act respecting education benefits for spouses and children of certain deceased federal enforcement officers", 12 May 2009.
- Bill C-394 "An Act to acknowledge that persons of Croatian origin were interned in Canada during the First World War and to provide for recognition of this event", 26 May 2009. This began as his Private Members' Bill C-374, which the Winnipeg Sun placed this item in its top ten list of bills (9 November 2006).
- Bill C-450, "An Act respecting a national day of remembrance of the Ukrainian Holodomor-Genocide".
- Bill C-537, "An Act to amend the Criminal Code (judicial interim release for offenses involving firearms)" to toughen up bail conditions for perpetrators of crimes involving guns, June 2010.

Regarding Bill C-181, Wrzesnewskyj gave a press conference in Ottawa together with David Matas and David Kilgour, authors of "Bloody Harvest: Organ Harvesting of Falun Gong Practitioners in China". While saying that "consumers benefit from trade with China", and that "Canada would like to do more trade with China", he asserted "it does not exonerate us for addressing the issue of Organ transplantation in China" and questioned "trusting a country that would engage in this sort of horrific crime against its own people."

Wrzesnewskyj helped pass MP James Bezan's Bill C-459, An Act to establish a Ukrainian Famine and Genocide Memorial Day and to recognize the Ukrainian Famine of 1932-33 as an act of genocide, at all stages through the House of Commons and Senate.

He also worked with MP Bob Rae to introduce and help pass unanimously through the House of Commons the Black Ribbon Day motion establishing an annual Canadian Day of Remembrance for the victims of Nazi and Soviet Communist regimes on August 23, called "Black Ribbon Day", to coincide with the anniversary of the signing of the infamous pact between the Nazi and Soviet Communist regimes.

=== Committees - House of Commons ===
In 2010, Wrzesnewskyj served as vice-chair on two committees: (1) Standing Committee on Citizenship and Immigration, (2) Subcommittee on Agenda and Procedure on the Standing Committee on Citizenship and Immigration.

Between 2004 and 2010, he served as member on eleven committees, including Standing Committee on Citizenship and Immigration, Standing Committee on Public Safety and National Security, Standing Committee on Public Accounts, and Standing Committee on Transport among others.

Wrzesnewskyj discussed the importance of Ukraine's accession to NATO at meetings of the Organization for Security and Co-operation in Europe parliamentary assembly meetings and official meetings of NATO member states. He was later selected as an official member of the delegation of the Speaker of the House of Commons to Ukraine (a trip geared toward developing relations between Canada and Ukraine).

He helped the previous Canadian government to negotiate and sign the historic agreement for $12.5 million with the Ukrainian Canadian community for the acknowledgement, commemoration and, education of Canadians of the dark episode of internment operations against Ukrainian Canadians.

=== International self-financed fact-finding missions ===
From 7–14 August 2009, Wrzesnewskyj took part in a self-financed fact-finding mission to Jordan, the West Bank, and East Jerusalem along with fellow parliamentarians from the New Democratic Party and Bloc Québécois. The mission's goals were to gain firsthand knowledge and understanding and assess the opportunities to build towards a peaceful and just solution between Israel, Palestine, Lebanon, Jordan and Egypt. He subsequently co-authored a report which offered several key recommendations to the Government of Canada. He also self-financed a fact-finding mission to Darfur, Sudan, regarding the Darfur Conflict, and another to Somalia.

=== RCMP pension scandal ===
In April 2007, Wrzesnewskyj called for a full judicial inquiry into the Royal Canadian Mounted Police (RCMP) pension fund scandal and spoke to the media on the matter. He was instrumental in bringing forward to the Public Accounts Committee, and pursuing, an investigation into the misuse of the RCMP pension and insurance funds involving the upper echelons of Canada's national police force which pressured the government into establishing the Task Force on Governance and Cultural Change in the RCMP. Here again, Canadian prime minister Paul Martin emphatically stated that "nothing would not have been done (with the RCMP pension scandal) if it hadn't been for Borys."

=== Hezbollah comments ===
In August 2006, Wrzesnewskyj said that the Canadian government should engage in talks with militant organizations, including Hezbollah, for the purpose of ending the 2006 Israel-Lebanon conflict. There were some media reports in this period that Wrzesnewskyj called for Hezbollah to be taken off Canada's list of terrorist organizations. He responded that this was a misrepresentation of his position, saying, "on the contrary, Hezbollah is a terrorist organization, and I stated that it must remain on Canada's list because it has committed war crimes by sending rockets into civilian areas." He added that Canadian law should be amended to permit political and diplomatic contact for the purposes of ending the conflict. As the result of media perceptions about his comments, he resigned his post as foreign affairs critic. He would later be critic for Crown Corporations for most of 2007.

=== Special Advisor to the Liberal Leader on Emerging Democracies ===
From 2009-11, Wrzesnewskyj held the position of Special Advisor to the Liberal Leader on Emerging Democracies.

As a Canadian parliamentarian of partial Polish heritage, Wrzesnewskyj is the founder of the Canada-Poland Parliamentary Friendship Group. He has persistently criticized Canadian Minister of Citizenship, Immigration, and Multiculturalism Jason Kenney for reducing immigration quotas from Poland, and Ukraine to Canada. He has also spoken to Canadian media on the Katyn Massacre and 2010 Polish Air Force Tu-154 crash that saw the deaths of Poland's senior government, diplomatic and military leaders, including President Lech Kaczynski.

In April 2010, with the president of the Canadian Jewish Congress Mark Freiman, Wrzesnewskyj organized a symposium featuring Meylakh Sheykhet, director of the Union of Councils for Jews of the former Soviet Union in Ukraine, on the importance of Ukrainian-Jewish relations in a historical and current geopolitical context.

Again in December 2010, Wrzesnewskyj and Mustafa Jemilev (Dzhemilev) spoke out about the potential for ethnic conflict in Crimea between Russians, Tartars, and Ukrainians.

== Defeat in 2011 and legal challenge ==
In the 2011 election, Wrzesnewskyj was defeated by Conservative candidate Ted Opitz by a margin of just 26 votes. A judicial recount subsequently confirmed Opitz's victory.

Nearly a year after the election, allegations of an election dirty tricks campaign linked to the Conservative Harper government persisted. At a news conference on 25 February 2012, interim Liberal Leader Bob Rae said that Wrzesnewskyj would be going to court on 2 May 2012 to call for a by-election. Wrzesnewskyj alleged that there were irregularities at ten polls in the riding of Etobicoke Centre.

=== Supreme Court of Canada case ===
In early 2012, Wrzesnewskyj challenged the 2011 election results in the Ontario Court of Justice, arguing voting irregularities, including ballots cast by people who did not live in the riding, the possibility that at least some people voted multiple times, and mistakes made in the conduct of the election by Elections Canada.

On May 18, Justice Thomas Lederer agreed with Wrzesnewskyj, declaring the election results null and void, and ordered a by-election in Etobicoke Centre. Lederer found that 79 voters, more than three times the 26-vote margin, had voted improperly. The ruling was the sixth instance since 1949 that a riding's federal electoral results were set aside by a judge.

Ted Opitz appealed to the Supreme Court of Canada and declined to step down for a by-election. Opitz continued to vote in the House of Commons. Wrzesnewskyj stated Opitz should sit out votes in the House of Commons: "It undermines ... our confidence in the democratic system that we have if we don't know who the actual member of Parliament is." Elections Canada sought introduce evidence in the Supreme Court case that its further research on the 79 voters in issue had determined that 44 of them were in fact citizens and qualified electors. Their position was supported by the Conservatives.

On 10 July 2012 the Supreme Court of Canada interrupted its summer break to hear appeals from Ted Opitz and to decide whether a by-election was required. "The Supreme Court will likely make its decision quickly since by law, it has to expedite the case. If the court rules this summer, there could be a by-election in Etobicoke Centre early in the new year, or sooner."

On Thursday October 25, 2012, the Supreme Court of Canada ruled in a split decision in favour of Opitz, allowing him to remain as MP for Etobicoke Center and once and for all putting an end to Wrzesnewskyj's dispute.

While the Conservatives paid Opitz's legal bills, the Liberal Party of Canada did the same for Wrzesnewskyj. who spent over $300,000 of his own money on the case.

== Out of Parliament (2011–2015) ==
Despite the narrow loss in the May 2011 election, Wrzesnewskyj has continued dedicating himself to public service. This includes the closure of the immigration case of Arjan Tabaj, championed by Wrzesnewskyj and immigration lawyer Scott McDonald. Tabaj is a partly paralyzed survivor of an assassination attempt during elections in Albania. In September 2011, Tabaj, his wife Anilda, his daughter and twin sons returned to Canada after Jason Kenney had the family deported in 2009. Later, a Canadian federal court ruled that the family was wrongfully deported. Lorne Waldman, a leading immigration lawyer said that stark reversals like the Tabaj case "are rarer than hen's teeth".

After the arrest of Ukrainian politician Yulia Tymoshenko in August 2011, Wrzesnewskyj participated in demonstrations at the Ukrainian Consulate in Toronto, calling for the support of democracy in Ukraine and release of all political prisoners. International organizations, representatives of the European Union and the United States called Tymoshenko's arrest "selective prosecution of political opponents".

In August 2011, Wrzesnewskyj led the Ukrainian Canadian community's fundraising effort for famine relief in Somalia, i.e. 2011 Horn of Africa famine, with $100,000 committed, mostly from one donor, entrepreneur and Northland Power founder Jim Temerty, "whose family roots go back to one of the regions that was worst affected in the Holodomor".

In December 2011, Wrzesnewskyj participated in a demonstration outside the Russian consulate in Toronto. He spoke against election fraud in the 2011 Russian parliamentary elections, advocated for democracy in Russia, warned against Putinism, and called for the government of Canada to state that "Canada stands 'shoulder to shoulder' with the people of Russia, and not with Putin or the Kremlin."

== Return to Parliament (2015–2019) ==
In the 2015 election, Wrzesnewskyj defeated Conservative MP Opitz by a margin of over 9,500 votes. During the election, he criticized the lack of investment in public transit by the Harper government. He also noted that Harper's time in office saw "increasing international jingoism," and criticized the Conservatives' handling of the global refugee crisis. Opitz also faced criticism for spending "more than $70,000 public dollars on self-service advertising flyers since 2011", including allegedly during an election period.

In late 2018, Wrzesnewskyj announced he would not be running for re-election in the coming 2019 election.

== Post-parliamentary career ==
During the 2022 Russian invasion of Ukraine, Wrzesnewskyj helped organize Canadian volunteers going to Ukraine to serve in the International Legion of Territorial Defense of Ukraine.

== Humanitarian work ==
Wrzesnewskyj is known for his humanitarian work both in his riding of Etobicoke Centre and abroad, including helping children causes in Ukraine. Through Future Bakery, Wrzesnewskyj was one of the original sponsors of the Out of the Cold program to aid the homeless and charitable organizations working in a number of Toronto's most challenging neighbourhoods.

In the late 1980s he helped organize and finance the nascent People's Movement of Ukraine (also known as Rukh). In 1991, financed and organized a group in support of the referendum for the independence of Ukraine. One of his projects was an underground printing press which produced and distributed several million pieces of pro-independence literature in the South and East of Ukraine. Throughout the 1990s, he was involved with projects in Ukraine such as the building of libraries and providing scholarships for gifted students.

Through his family foundation, Wrzesnewskyj has provided funding support for the following:

- The Ukraine Transparency and Election Monitoring Project to train independent election scrutineers in Ukraine.
- The Ukraine List electronic periodical of the Chair of Ukrainian Studies (University of Ottawa) targeting policy specialists and academics.
- The delivery of Ukrainian News to every MP and Senator in Canada's Parliament.
- The publication and delivery of Ukraine Analyst to members of the Canada-Ukraine Parliamentary Friendship Group.
- Ukrainian courses at The Centre for European, Russian, and Eurasian Studies (CERES) at the University of Toronto.
- Grants for archival research into Ukrainian national movements during World War II.
- The republication of books about Ukrainians who perished in the Holocaust.
- Archival research into victims of the Holocaust and Soviet terror in the Sambir region of Ukraine.
- Donated $500,000 to build the Ukrainian Canadian Care Centre (Toronto, Ontario, Canada).
- Annually sponsored an intern from Ukraine to participate in an internship program in Canada's Parliament (Canada-Ukraine Parliamentary Program).
- Donated $250,000 to finance election observers for the first round of voting in Ukraine.
- Self-funded missions to Sudan, Darfur, Somalia, the West Bank, and East Jerusalem.
- Lead the Ukrainian Canadian community's fundraising effort for famine relief in Somalia during the 2011 Horn of Africa famine, with $100,000 committed.
- Donated $100,000 to the Ukrainian Catholic University in Lviv, Ukraine.
- In 2014 he sponsored the publication of "This Blessed Land: Crimea and the Crimean Tatars" by Paul Robert Magocsi

In December 2010, he created the Roman Wrzesnewskyj Polish Endowment Fund with a $35,000 donation toward the preservation and development of advanced Polish language studies at the Department of Slavic Languages and Literatures, University of Toronto. Additionally, each Christmas and New Year's Day, he donates his time by delivering toys and gifts to children in community housing projects in Etobicoke Centre.

== Awards and recognition ==
Ukrainian president Viktor Yushchenko awarded Wrzesnewskyj the Order of Prince Yaroslav the Wise, one of Ukraine's highest honours, during a special May 26, 2008 ceremony on Parliament Hill, for distinguished services to the state and people of the Ukrainian nation.

In recognition of his public service in Canada–Poland relations, the Canadian Polish Congress awarded him the Gold Honorary Award on January 23, 2010. For his work with Ukrainian Canadian community, the Ukrainian Canadian Congress awarded him its highest honour, the Shevchenko Medal, on October 27, 2010.

On February 25, 2011 Wrzesnewskyj was awarded the Estonian Canadian Medal of Merit for his outstanding contribution to Canadians of Estonian heritage.

On November 15, 2014, President of Poland Bronisław Komorowski, awarded the Knight's Cross of the Order of Merit to Wrzesnewskyj, which advocated, among others, the abolition of visas to Canada for Polish citizens and donated the program of Polish language and literature at the University of Toronto.

== Electoral record ==
2015 Canadian federal election: Etobicoke Centre
Party	Candidate	Votes	%	±%	Expenditures
Liberal	Borys Wrzesnewskyj	32,612	52.77	+12.21	$183,159.14
Conservative	Ted Opitz	23,070	37.33	-4.53	$123,382.55
New Democratic	Tanya De Mello	4,886	7.91	-6.72	$86,715.88
Green	Shawn Rizvi	856	1.39	-1.30	–
Progressive Canadian	Rob Wolvin	378	0.61		–
Total valid votes/expense limit		61,802	100.00		$226,574.91
Total rejected ballots		303	0.49		
Turnout		62,105	71.03		
Eligible voters		87,440			
Liberal gain from Conservative		Swing		+8.37	
Source: Elections Canada

2011 Canadian federal election: Etobicoke Centre
Party	Candidate	Votes	%	±%	Expenditures
Conservative	Ted Opitz	21,644	41.2%	+3.7%	–
Liberal	Borys Wrzesnewskyj	21,618	41.2%	-7.7%	–
New Democratic	Ana Maria Rivero	7,735	14.7%	+6.4%	–
Green	Katarina Zoricic	1,377	2.6%	-2.8%	–
Marxist–Leninist	Sarah Thompson	149	0.3%		–
Total valid votes/expense limit		52,523	100.0		–
Total rejected ballots		271	0.51	+0.02	
Turnout		52,794	65.49	+3.8	
Eligible voters		80,603			

2008 Canadian federal election: Etobicoke Centre
Party	Candidate	Votes	%	±%	Expenditures
Liberal	Borys Wrzesnewskyj	24,537	48.9	-3.5	$72,089
Conservative	Axel Kuhn	18,839	37.5	+4.3	$83,207
New Democratic	Joseph Schwartz	4,164	8.3	-1.3	
Green	Marion Schaffer	2,688	5.4	+1.6	$352
Total valid votes/expense limit		50,228	100.0		$85,584
Total rejected ballots		247	0.49		
Turnout		50,475	62.7		

2006 Canadian federal election: Etobicoke Centre
Party	Candidate	Votes	%	±%	Expenditures
Liberal	Borys Wrzesnewskyj	29,509	52.44	−5.84	$78,982
Conservative	Axel Kuhn	18,702	33.24	+4.85	$77,310
New Democratic	Cynthia Cameron	5,426	9.64	−0.27	$1,391
Green	John Vanderheyden	2,111	3.75	+0.54	$1,087
Progressive Canadian	Norman Dundas	402	0.71	n/a	$18
Marxist–Leninist	France Tremblay	117	0.21	-	none listed
Total valid votes		56,267	100.00		
Total rejected ballots		220			
Turnout		56,487	71.95	+4.67	
Electors on the lists		78,511			
Liberal hold		Swing		-5.35	
Sources: Official Results, Elections Canada and Financial Returns, Elections Canada.

2004 Canadian federal election: Etobicoke Centre
Party	Candidate	Votes	%	±%	Expenditures
Liberal	Borys Wrzesnewskyj	30,441	58.28	+1.9	$76,192
Conservative	Lida Preyma	14,829	28.39	-10.2	$72,841
New Democratic	John Richmond	5,174	9.91	+5.3	$4,977
Green	Margo Pearson	1,676	3.21	–	not listed
Marxist–Leninist	France Tremblay	112	0.21	-0.2	not listed
Total valid votes		52,232	100.00		
Total rejected ballots		249			
Turnout		52,481	67.28		
Electors on the lists		78,007			
Liberal hold		Swing		+6.05	
Percentage change figures are factored for redistribution. Conservative Party percentages are contrasted with the combined Canadian Alliance and Progressive Conservative percentages from 2000.
Sources: Official Results, Elections Canada and Financial Returns, Elections Canada.
