= Etobicoke Centre (federal electoral district) =

Federal electoral district in Ontario, Canada

Coordinates: 43.6481°N 79.5577°W

Ontario electoral district
- Interactive map of riding boundaries from the 2025 federal election

Federal electoral district
- Legislature: House of Commons
MP
Yvan Baker
Liberal
- District created: 1976
- First contested: 1979
- Last contested: 2021
- District webpage: profile, map

Demographics
- Population (2021): 118,483
- Electors (2015): 86,412
- Area (km²): 39
- Pop. density (per km²): 3,038
- Census division: Toronto
- Census subdivision: Toronto (part)

Etobicoke Centre (French: Etobicoke-Centre) is a federal electoral district in Ontario, Canada, that has been represented in the House of Commons of Canada since 1979.

== Geography ==
The riding includes the neighbourhoods of Eatonville (part), Islington-City Centre West (part), Richview, Humber Heights - Westmount, Eringate – Centennial – West Deane, Markland Wood, Princess Gardens, Thorncrest Village and Humber Valley Village in the former city of Etobicoke, Toronto.

== History ==
The riding was created in 1976 from part of the Etobicoke riding in what was then a constituent municipality of Metropolitan Toronto.

On May 18, 2012, the Ontario Superior Court declared the 2011 federal election results for this district to be null and void. The judge ruled that 79 votes should not have been counted when the margin of victory in the riding was only 26 votes. On May 28, 2012, however, the incumbent Member of Parliament, Ted Opitz, filed an appeal with the Supreme Court of Canada. On October 25, 2012, the Supreme Court allowed Opitz's appeal and quashed the order for a by-election. In its decision, the Supreme Court restored 59 of the 79 tossed votes, essentially leaving Optiz with a 6 vote margin of victory.

This riding lost territory to Etobicoke North and gained territory from Etobicoke—Lakeshore during the 2012 electoral redistribution.

=== Members of Parliament ===
It has elected five members of the House of Commons of Canada:

Parliament	Years	Member	Party
Etobicoke Centre; Riding created from Etobicoke and High Park—Humber Valley
31st	1979–1980	Michael Wilson	Progressive Conservative
32nd	1980–1984	Michael Wilson	Progressive Conservative
33rd	1984–1988	Michael Wilson	Progressive Conservative
34th	1988–1993	Michael Wilson	Progressive Conservative
35th	1993–1997	Allan Rock	Liberal
36th	1997–2000	Allan Rock	Liberal
37th	2000–2004	Allan Rock	Liberal
38th	2004–2006	Borys Wrzesnewskyj	Liberal
39th	2006–2008	Borys Wrzesnewskyj	Liberal
40th	2008–2011	Borys Wrzesnewskyj	Liberal
41st	2011–2015	Ted Opitz	Conservative
42nd	2015–2019	Borys Wrzesnewskyj	Liberal
43rd	2019–2021	Yvan Baker	Liberal
44th	2021–2025	Yvan Baker	Liberal
45th	2025–present	Yvan Baker	Liberal

== Demographics ==
According to the 2021 Canadian census

Languages: 52.7% English, 4.2% Italian, 3.6% Ukrainian, 3.4% Spanish, 2.8% Portuguese, 2.6% Polish, 2.5% Serbian, 1.4% Russian, 1.4% Tagalog, 1.4% Albanian, 1.3% Korean, 1.1% Mandarin

Religions: 67.8% Christian (41.2% Catholic, 7.6% Christian Orthodox, 3.0% Anglican, 2.8% United Church, 1.4% Presbyterian, 11.8% other), 6.9% Muslim, 2.5% Hindu, 1.2% Buddhist, 20.3% none

Median income: $44,400 (2020)

Average income: $69,200 (2020)

Panethnic groups in Etobicoke Centre (2011−2021)
Panethnic group	2021		2016		2011	
Panethnic group	Pop.	%	Pop.	%	Pop.	%
European (Note: Statistic includes all persons that did not make up part of a visible minority or an indigenous identity.)	79,235	67.6%	83,940	72.33%	84,535	74.61%
African	8,275	7.06%	6,825	5.88%	6,510	5.75%
South Asian	7,885	6.73%	6,905	5.95%	6,740	5.95%
East Asian (Note: Statistic includes total responses of "Chinese", "Korean", and "Japanese" under visible minority section on census.)	6,060	5.17%	6,195	5.34%	5,565	4.91%
Southeast Asian (Note: Statistic includes total responses of "Filipino" and "Southeast Asian" under visible minority section on census.)	4,815	4.11%	3,555	3.06%	3,020	2.67%
Latin American	4,630	3.95%	3,725	3.21%	2,915	2.57%
Middle Eastern (Note: Statistic includes total responses of "West Asian" and "Arab" under visible minority section on census.)	2,430	2.07%	2,200	1.9%	1,900	1.68%
Indigenous	760	0.65%	680	0.59%	470	0.41%
Other/multiracial (Note: Statistic includes total responses of "Visible minority, n.i.e." and "Multiple visible minorities" under visible minority section on census.)	3,105	2.65%	2,045	1.76%	1,650	1.46%
Total responses	117,205	98.92%	116,055	98.33%	113,310	98.61%
Total population	118,483	100%	118,022	100%	114,910	100%
Notes: Totals greater than 100% due to multiple origin responses. Demographics based on 2012 Canadian federal electoral redistribution riding boundaries.

== Election results ==
View source data.
Graph of election results in Etobicoke Centre (minor parties that never got 2% of the vote or didn't run consistently are omitted)

2025 Canadian federal election
Party	Candidate	Votes	%	±%	Expenditures
Liberal	Yvan Baker	36,186	53.6	+5.5	
Conservative	Ted Opitz	29,713	44.0	+9.9	
New Democratic	Ji Won Jung	1,611	2.4	–8.4	
Total valid votes/expense limit		67,510	99.2		
Total rejected ballots		556	0.8		
Turnout		68,066	69.4	+5.8	
Eligible voters		98,074			
Liberal hold		Swing		–1.93	
Source: Elections Canada

2021 federal election redistributed results
Party	Vote	%
Liberal	28,363	48.14
Conservative	20,089	34.09
New Democratic	6,340	10.76
People's	3,881	6.59
Green	186	0.32
Others	63	0.11

2021 Canadian federal election
Party	Candidate	Votes	%	±%	Expenditures
Liberal	Yvan Baker	27,623	47.9	-4.0	$96,412.48
Conservative	Geoff Turner	20,208	35.1	+0.6	$26,481.81
New Democratic	Ashley Da Silva	5,809	10.1	+2.4	$0.00
People's	Maurice Cormier	4,000	6.9	+5.8	$2,062.10
Total valid votes/expense limit		57,640	–	–	$118,661.19
Total rejected ballots					
Turnout		63.56			
Eligible voters		90,683			
Source: Elections Canada

2019 Canadian federal election
Party	Candidate	Votes	%	±%	Expenditures
Liberal	Yvan Baker	32,800	51.9	-0.87	$98,039.05
Conservative	Ted Opitz	21,804	34.5	-2.83	$100,790.81
New Democratic	Heather Vickers-Wong	4,881	7.7	-0.21	$8,510.54
Green	Cameron Semple	2,775	4.4	+3.01	none listed
People's	Nicholas Serdiuk	664	1.1	-	none listed
Libertarian	Mark Wrzesniewski	295	0.5	-	none listed
Total valid votes/expense limit		63,219	100.0		
Total rejected ballots		624			
Turnout		63,843	69.5		
Eligible voters		91,889			
Liberal hold		Swing		+0.98	
Source: Elections Canada

2015 Canadian federal election
Party	Candidate	Votes	%	±%	Expenditures
Liberal	Borys Wrzesnewskyj	32,612	52.77	+12.21	$183,159.14
Conservative	Ted Opitz	23,070	37.33	-4.53	$123,382.55
New Democratic	Tanya De Mello	4,886	7.91	-6.72	$86,715.88
Green	Shawn Rizvi	856	1.39	-1.30	–
Progressive Canadian	Rob Wolvin	378	0.61		–
Total valid votes/expense limit		61,802	100.00		$226,574.91
Total rejected ballots		303	0.49		
Turnout		62,105	71.03		
Eligible voters		87,440			
Liberal gain from Conservative		Swing		+8.37	
Source: Elections Canada

2011 federal election redistributed results
Party	Vote	%
Conservative	22,306	41.86
Liberal	21,616	40.56
New Democratic	7,792	14.62
Green	1,431	2.69
Others	146	0.27

2011 Canadian federal election
Party	Candidate	Votes	%	±%	Expenditures
Conservative	Ted Opitz	21,644	41.2%	+3.7%	–
Liberal	Borys Wrzesnewskyj	21,618	41.2%	-7.7%	–
New Democratic	Ana Maria Rivero	7,735	14.7%	+6.4%	–
Green	Katarina Zoricic	1,377	2.6%	-2.8%	–
Marxist–Leninist	Sarah Thompson	149	0.3%		–
Total valid votes/expense limit		52,523	100.0		–
Total rejected ballots		271	0.51	+0.02	
Turnout		52,794	65.49	+3.8	
Eligible voters		80,603			

2008 Canadian federal election
Party	Candidate	Votes	%	±%	Expenditures
Liberal	Borys Wrzesnewskyj	24,537	48.9	-3.5	$72,089
Conservative	Axel Kuhn	18,839	37.5	+4.3	$83,207
New Democratic	Joseph Schwartz	4,164	8.3	-1.3	
Green	Marion Schaffer	2,688	5.4	+1.6	$352
Total valid votes/expense limit		50,228	100.0		$85,584
Total rejected ballots		247	0.49		
Turnout		50,475	62.7		

2006 Canadian federal election
Party	Candidate	Votes	%	±%	Expenditures
Liberal	Borys Wrzesnewskyj	29,509	52.44	−5.84	$78,982
Conservative	Axel Kuhn	18,702	33.24	+4.85	$77,310
New Democratic	Cynthia Cameron	5,426	9.64	−0.27	$1,391
Green	John Vanderheyden	2,111	3.75	+0.54	$1,087
Progressive Canadian	Norman Dundas	402	0.71	n/a	$18
Marxist–Leninist	France Tremblay	117	0.21	-	none listed
Total valid votes		56,267	100.00		
Total rejected ballots		220			
Turnout		56,487	71.95	+4.67	
Electors on the lists		78,511			
Liberal hold		Swing		-5.35	
Sources: Official Results, Elections Canada and Financial Returns, Elections Canada.

2004 Canadian federal election
Party	Candidate	Votes	%	±%	Expenditures
Liberal	Borys Wrzesnewskyj	30,441	58.28	+1.9	$76,192
Conservative	Lida Preyma	14,829	28.39	-10.2	$72,841
New Democratic	John Richmond	5,174	9.91	+5.3	$4,977
Green	Margo Pearson	1,676	3.21	–	not listed
Marxist–Leninist	France Tremblay	112	0.21	-0.2	not listed
Total valid votes		52,232	100.00		
Total rejected ballots		249			
Turnout		52,481	67.28		
Electors on the lists		78,007			
Liberal hold		Swing		+6.05	
Percentage change figures are factored for redistribution. Conservative Party percentages are contrasted with the combined Canadian Alliance and Progressive Conservative percentages from 2000.
Sources: Official Results, Elections Canada and Financial Returns, Elections Canada.

2000 Canadian federal election
Party	Candidate	Votes	%	±%
Liberal	Allan Rock	26,083	56.4	+1.8
Alliance	Michael G. Kraik	10,318	22.3	+5.1
Progressive Conservative	Ross Vaughan	7,566	16.4	-5.6
New Democratic	Karen Dolan	2,124	4.6	-0.7
Marxist–Leninist	Dagmar Sullivan	181	0.4	0.0
Total valid votes		46,272	100.0	

Note: Canadian Alliance vote is compared to the Reform vote in 1997 election.

1997 Canadian federal election
Party	Candidate	Votes	%	±%
Liberal	Allan Rock	27,345	54.6	+0.2
Progressive Conservative	Alida Leistra	11,023	22.0	+2.5
Reform	Jason Beyak	8,638	17.2	-4.9
New Democratic	Matthew Bonk	2,661	5.3	+3.1
Natural Law	Paul Gasztold	267	0.5	+0.1
Marxist–Leninist	Janice Murray	189	0.4	+0.3
Total valid votes		50,123	100.0	

1993 Canadian federal election
Party	Candidate	Votes	%	±%
Liberal	Allan Rock	25,633	54.3	+13.9
Reform	Charles McLeod	10,440	22.1	
Progressive Conservative	Charles Donley	9,203	19.5	-28.9
New Democratic	Udayan Rege	1,037	2.2	-7.4
National	Janice Tait	500	1.1	
Natural Law	Everett Murphy	200	0.4	
Abolitionist	Kelly Ann Leblanc	77	0.2	
Marxist–Leninist	Janice Murray	53	0.1	
Commonwealth of Canada	Joseph Zmak	25	0.1	-0.1
Total valid votes		47,168	100.0	

1988 Canadian federal election
Party	Candidate	Votes	%	±%
Progressive Conservative	Michael Wilson	24,338	48.4	-8.4
Liberal	Mary Schwass	20,342	40.5	+10.6
New Democratic	Phil Jones	4,815	9.6	-3.2
Libertarian	Janice E. Hazlett	373	0.7	+0.2
Green	Isabel Van Humbeck	187	0.4	
Communist	Dan Goldstick	81	0.2	
Commonwealth of Canada	John J. Benz	70	0.1	
Independent	Jeanne Gatley	62	0.1	
Total valid votes		50,268	100.0	

1984 Canadian federal election
Party	Candidate	Votes	%	±%
Progressive Conservative	Michael Wilson	34,026	56.8	+9.7
Liberal	Jim Brown	17,853	29.8	-11.6
New Democratic	Phil Jones	7,657	12.8	+2.0
Libertarian	Shirley Yamada	339	0.6	0.0
Total valid votes		59,875	100.0	

1980 Canadian federal election
Party	Candidate	Votes	%	±%
Progressive Conservative	Michael Wilson	26,969	47.1	-4.2
Liberal	Joe Cruden	23,715	41.4	+3.7
New Democratic	Dan Shipley	6,181	10.8	+0.6
Libertarian	Norman R. Andersen	308	0.5	+0.1
Marxist–Leninist	Anne Boylan	88	0.2	+0.1
Total valid votes		57,261	100.0	
lop.parl.ca

1979 Canadian federal election
Party	Candidate	Votes	%
Progressive Conservative	Michael Wilson	31,498	51.3
Liberal	Alastair Gillespie	23,141	37.7
New Democratic	Dan Shipley	6,237	10.2
Libertarian	Norman R. Andersen	272	0.4
Communist	Nick Hrynchyshyn	112	0.2
Independent	Helen Obadia	54	0.1
Marxist–Leninist	James H. Reid	38	0.1
Total valid votes		61,352	100.0

== Student vote results ==
2025 Etobicoke Centre student vote
48.21%	32.88%	18.92%
Liberal	Conservative	NDP

== Toronto City Council Wards 3-4 ==
Since 2000 Toronto City Council Wards 3 and 4 share the same name.

- Ward 3
  - Stephen Holyday 2014–present
  - Peter Leon 2013-2014
  - Doug Holyday 2000-2013
- Ward 4
  - John Campbell 2014–present
  - Gloria Lindsay Luby 2000-2014

== See also ==
- List of Canadian electoral districts
- Historical federal electoral districts of Canada
