= Ward 3 Etobicoke—Lakeshore =

Municipal council district in Toronto, Ontario, Canada

- Constituency for the Toronto City Council
- Location of Ward 3 in Toronto
- City: Toronto
- Population: 129,080 (2016)

Current constituency
- Created: 2018
- Councillor: Amber Morley
- Community council: Etobicoke/York
- Created from: Ward 5; Ward 6
- First contested: 2018 election
- Last contested: 2026 election
- Ward profile: www.toronto.ca/ward-3-etobicoke-lakeshore/

Ward 3 Etobicoke—Lakeshore is a municipal electoral division in Toronto, Ontario, Canada that has been represented in the Toronto City Council since the 2018 municipal election. It was last contested in 2026, with Amber Morley elected councillor.

== Boundaries ==
On August 14, 2018, the Government of Ontario redrew municipal boundaries via the Better Local Government Act, 2018, S.O. 2018, c. 11 - Bill 5. This means that the 25 provincial electoral districts and the 25 municipal wards in Toronto currently share the same geographic borders.

Defined in legislation as:

Consisting of that part of the City of Toronto described as follows: commencing at the intersection of the Humber River with Dundas Street West; thence southwesterly along said street to the Canadian Pacific Railway; thence southerly along said railway to Mimico Creek; thence generally northwesterly along said creek to Kipling Avenue; thence southerly along said avenue to Bloor Street West; thence westerly along said street to Highway No. 427; thence southerly along said highway to Dundas Street West; thence westerly along said street to the westerly limit of the City of Toronto; thence generally southerly and northeasterly along the westerly and southerly limits of said city to the southeasterly production of the Humber River; thence generally northwesterly along said production and the Humber River to the point of commencement

== History ==
=== 2018 Boundary Adjustment ===
Toronto municipal ward boundaries were significantly modified in 2018 during the election campaign. Ultimately the new ward structure was used and later upheld by the Supreme Court of Canada in 2021.

The current ward is an amalgamation of the old Ward 5 (northern section), the old Ward 6 (southern section).

=== 2022 municipal election ===
Amber Morley was elected to represent Ward 3 in the 2022 municipal election. She defeated Mark Grimes, the only defeat of an incumbent councillor who was running for reelection in 2022.

=== 2018 municipal election ===
Ward 3 was first contested during the 2018 municipal election. Then-Ward 6 incumbent Mark Grimes was elected with 40.9 per cent of the vote.

== Geography ==
Etobicoke—Lakeshore is part of the Etobicoke and York community council.

The ward occupies the southwestern part of Toronto. It is roughly bordered on the west by the Etobicoke Creek, and on the east by the Humber River. On the north, Ward 3 is roughly bordered by Bloor Street, Kipling Avenue, the Mimico Creek and Dundas Street, and on the south by Lake Ontario.

== Councillors ==
Council term		Member	
Council term		Lakeshore-Queensway (Metro Council)	
1988–1991	1988–1990	Chris Stockwell	
1988–1991	1990–1991	Blake Kinahan	
1991–1994		Blake Kinahan	
1994–1997		Blake Kinahan	
		Ward 2 Lakeshore-Queensway	
1997–2000		Irene Jones, Blake Kinahan	
		Ward 5 Etobicoke—Lakeshore	Ward 6 Etobicoke—Lakeshore
2000–2003		Peter Milczyn	Irene Jones
2003–2006		Peter Milczyn	Mark Grimes
2006–2010		Peter Milczyn	Mark Grimes
2010–2014	2010–2014	Peter Milczyn	Mark Grimes
2010–2014	2014	James Maloney	Mark Grimes
2014–2018		Justin Di Ciano	Mark Grimes
		Ward 3 Etobicoke—Lakeshore	
2018–2022		Mark Grimes	
2022–2026		Amber Morley	
2026–2030		Amber Morley	

== Election results ==
2026 Toronto municipal election

Candidate	Votes	%	minus
Amber Morley (X)	25,521	48.40	1.96 ▲
Ted Opitz	19,494	36.97	–
Mihaela Andrei	5,329	10.11	–
Anthony Internicola	2,381	4.52	–

2022 Toronto municipal election, Ward 3 Etobicoke—Lakeshore
Candidate	Vote	%
Amber Morley	15,271	46.44
Mark Grimes (X)	13,258	40.32
Mary Markovic	2,625	7.98
Marco Valle	644	1.96
Bonnie Hu	618	1.88
Zeynel Ari	467	1.42

2018 Toronto municipal election, Ward 3 Etobicoke—Lakeshore
Candidate	Votes	Vote share
Mark Grimes	16,527	40.90%
Amber Morley	10,985	27.19%
Pamela Gough	7,301	18.07%
Iain Davis	2,722	6.74%
Svitlana Burlakova	1,218	3.01%
Peggy Moulder	575	1.42%
Patrizia Nigro	394	0.98%
Michael Julihen	320	0.79%
Michael Loomans	199	0.49%
Robert Gunnyon	167	0.41%
Total	40,408	100%
Source: City of Toronto

== See also ==
- Municipal elections in Canada
- Municipal government of Toronto
- List of Toronto municipal elections
