= Yvan Baker =

Canadian politician (born 1977)

Yvan Baker MP
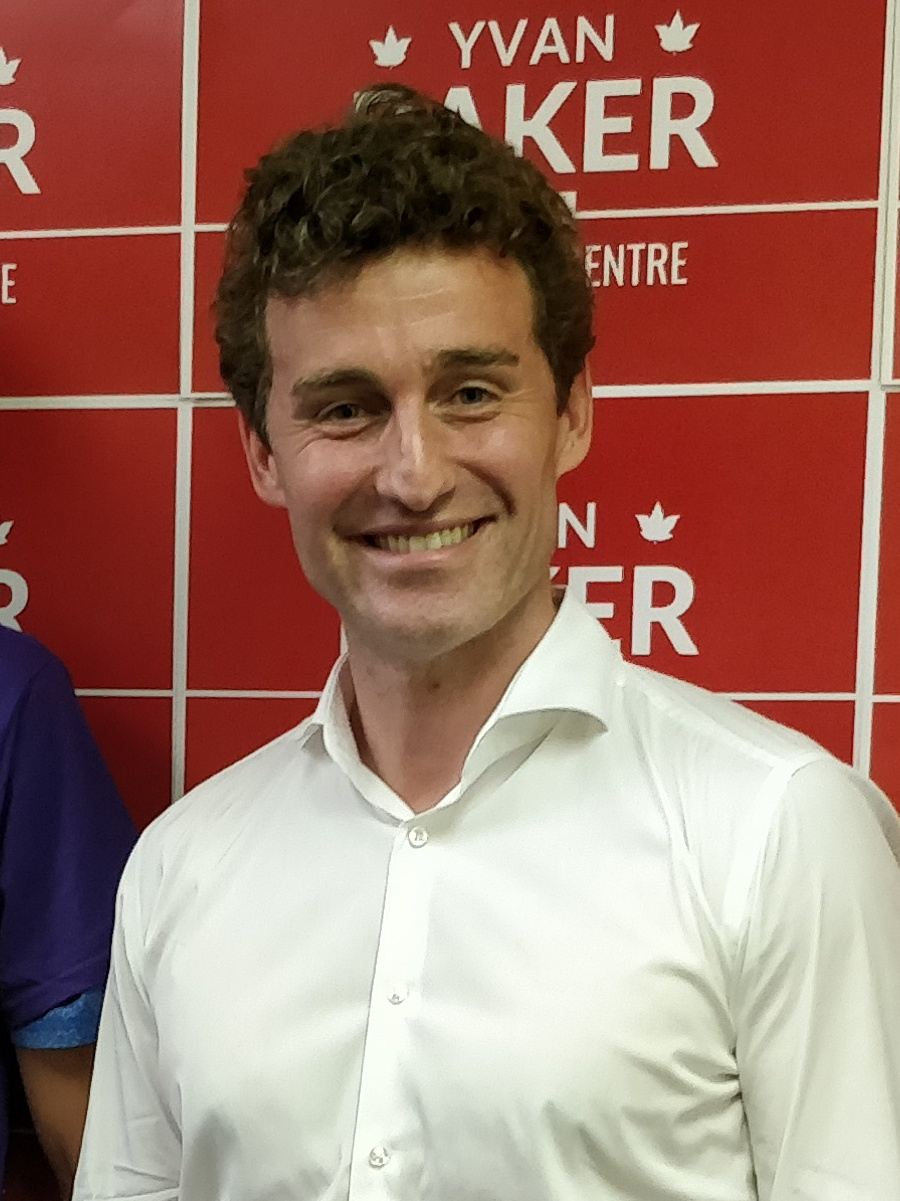
- Baker in 2019

Member of Parliament for Etobicoke Centre
- Incumbent
- Assumed office October 21, 2019
- Preceded by: Borys Wrzesnewskyj

Member of the Ontario Provincial Parliament for Etobicoke Centre
- In office June 12, 2014 – June 7, 2018
- Preceded by: Donna Cansfield
- Succeeded by: Kinga Surma

Personal details
- Born: December 8, 1977 (age 48) Etobicoke, Ontario
- Party: Liberal Party of Canada (Federal); Ontario Liberal Party (Provincial)
- Spouse: Amanda Simard (m. 2026)
- Education: Toronto French School
- Alma mater: York University (BBA); Dartmouth College (MBA)
- Occupation: Management consultant Politician

Yvan Baker MP (born December 8, 1977) is a Canadian politician who served as the member of Parliament (MP) for the federal riding of Etobicoke Centre since 2019. He is a member of the Liberal Party of Canada. Prior to entering federal politics, he served as the Liberal member of the Legislative Assembly of Ontario for the provincial riding of Etobicoke Centre from 2014 to 2018.

== Background ==
Baker was born in Etobicoke, Ontario, the son of Myroslava (Oleksiuk) and Donald Baker. His mother was born in Kiel, Germany, to a Ukrainian family, and his paternal family is Scottish. Baker grew up in the West End Toronto neighbourhood of Etobicoke and attended Toronto French School. He graduated with a BBA from the Schulich School of Business at York University and went on to work for Scotiabank. He then accepted a position as an Executive Assistant to the Member of Parliament for Etobicoke Centre Borys Wrzesnewskyj before obtaining his Master of Business Administration from the Tuck School of Business at Dartmouth College, New Hampshire. After graduation Baker became a management consultant with the Boston Consulting Group, working out of the New York and Toronto offices before starting his own consultancy based out of Toronto. Baker previously taught Master of Business Administration students at Schulich School of Business at York University.

Baker has also worked on several charitable initiatives and community projects. These include serving as a board director for Leave out Violence, the Emerging Leaders Network, and Global Grassroots, where he supported emerging female leaders in Rwanda on projects addressing issues such as lack of access to water, domestic violence and health education. He is a recipient of the Queen Elizabeth II Diamond Jubilee Medal.

== Political career ==
=== Provincial politics ===
Baker was elected to the Ontario Legislature in 2014 as the MPP for Etobicoke Centre. He served as parliamentary assistant to Minister of Finance Charles Sousa. Previously, Baker served as parliamentary assistant to Deb Matthews, president of the Treasury Board from 2014 to 2016.

His other legislative roles included parliamentary assistant to the Minister Responsible for Digital Government; commissioner, Board of Internal Economy; and vice-chair, Standing Committee on Finance and Economic Affairs.

==== Private members' public bills ====
In May 2015, Baker introduced the Ontario Flag Day Act, 2015, which sought to proclaim May 21 of each year as Ontario Flag Day. The bill passed with the unanimous support of all three parties.

Baker also introduced the Pathways to Post-secondary Excellence Act, which would make it easier for high school students to research post-secondary educational institutions. This would be done by centralizing data in the areas of admission, student experience and outcomes for recent graduates ". The bill was endorsed by the Ontario Undergraduate Student Alliance, Canadian Federation of Students, the College Student Alliance and the Graduate Student Alliance. The bill did not proceed past first reading.

In 2017, Baker proposed the Phones Down, Heads Up Act, a bill to fine pedestrians between $50 and $125 for texting while crossing the street. The bill attracted criticism from Ontario New Democratic Party MPP Cheri DiNovo and pedestrian-safety advocacy group Walk Toronto, who argued that there is little evidence that distracted walking is a risk, and that it shifts the safety onus from drivers to pedestrians.

==== Community involvement ====
In Etobicoke Centre, Baker hosted Community Recognition Awards annually which highlighted local individuals and organizations for making a difference in the community. The awards were available in four categories; Outstanding Volunteer Service to the Community, Outstanding Volunteer Service to Seniors, Outstanding Volunteer Service to the Community by Youth and Outstanding Service by Professional Staff. Approximately 30 individuals and organizations are honoured every year.

An annual Government and Community Services Fair was co-hosted every year by Baker and Etobicoke—Lakeshore MPP Peter Milczyn. In 2015, the event featured more than 110 exhibitors from the provincial government, agencies and community organizations.

=== Federal politics ===
On October 30, 2018, Baker announced his intention to seek the Liberal Party of Canada nomination in the federal riding of Etobicoke Centre.

He was elected chair of the Canadian House of Commons Standing Committee on Official Languages in the 45th Canadian Parliament in 2025.

== Personal life ==
He married Amanda Simard, the former Progressive Conservative and later Liberal MPP for the provincial riding of Glengarry-Prescott-Russell, on September 20, 2026.

== Election results ==
=== Federal ===
2025 Canadian federal election: Etobicoke Centre
Party	Candidate	Votes	%	±%	Expenditures
Liberal	Yvan Baker	36,186	53.6	+5.5	
Conservative	Ted Opitz	29,713	44.0	+9.9	
New Democratic	Ji Won Jung	1,611	2.4	–8.4	
Total valid votes/expense limit		67,510	99.2		
Total rejected ballots		556	0.8		
Turnout		68,066	69.4	+5.8	
Eligible voters		98,074			
Liberal hold		Swing		–1.93	
Source: Elections Canada

2021 Canadian federal election: Etobicoke Centre
Party	Candidate	Votes	%	±%	Expenditures
Liberal	Yvan Baker	27,623	47.9	-4.0	$96,412.48
Conservative	Geoff Turner	20,208	35.1	+0.6	$26,481.81
New Democratic	Ashley Da Silva	5,809	10.1	+2.4	$0.00
People's	Maurice Cormier	4,000	6.9	+5.8	$2,062.10
Total valid votes/expense limit		57,640	–	–	$118,661.19
Total rejected ballots					
Turnout		63.56			
Eligible voters		90,683			
Source: Elections Canada

2019 Canadian federal election: Etobicoke Centre
Party	Candidate	Votes	%	±%	Expenditures
Liberal	Yvan Baker	32,800	51.9	-0.87	$98,039.05
Conservative	Ted Opitz	21,804	34.5	-2.83	$100,790.81
New Democratic	Heather Vickers-Wong	4,881	7.7	-0.21	$8,510.54
Green	Cameron Semple	2,775	4.4	+3.01	none listed
People's	Nicholas Serdiuk	664	1.1	-	none listed
Libertarian	Mark Wrzesniewski	295	0.5	-	none listed
Total valid votes/expense limit		63,219	100.0		
Total rejected ballots		624			
Turnout		63,843	69.5		
Eligible voters		91,889			
Liberal hold		Swing		+0.98	
Source: Elections Canada

=== Provincial ===
2018 Ontario general election: Etobicoke Centre
Party	Candidate	Votes	%	±%
Progressive Conservative	Kinga Surma	24,432	43.00	+10.58
Liberal	Yvan Baker	19,708	34.68	–14.02
New Democratic	Erica Kelly	10,311	18.15	+6.63
Green	Shawn Rizvi	1,329	2.34	–0.29
Canadians' Choice	Paul Fromm	631	1.11	–
Libertarian	Basil Mummery	252	0.44	–
Independent	Wallace Richards	162	0.29	–
Total valid votes		56,825	99.00	
Total rejected, unmarked and declined ballots		573	1.00	–0.42
Turnout		57,398	61.91	+5.43
Eligible voters		92,715		
Progressive Conservative notional gain from Liberal		Swing		+12.30
Source: Elections Ontario

2014 Ontario general election
Party	Candidate	Votes	%	±%
Liberal	Yvan Baker	23,848	50.28%	
Progressive Conservative	Pina Martino	15,520	32.72%	
New Democratic	Chris Jones	5,758	12.14%	
Green	George Morrison	1,254	2.64%	
Libertarian	Alexander T. Bussmann	528	1.11%	
People's Political Party	John J. Martins	193	0.41	
Freedom	Andrew Kuess	189	0.40	
Vegan Environmental	Felicia Trigiani	142	0.30	
Source: Elections Ontario
