= Etobicoke Centre (provincial electoral district) =

Provincial electoral district in Ontario, Canada

Coordinates: 43.648°N 79.5577°W

Ontario electoral district
- Location in Toronto

Provincial electoral district
- Legislature: Legislative Assembly of Ontario
MPP
Kinga Surma
Progressive Conservative
- District created: 1996
- First contested: 1999
- Last contested: 2025

Demographics
- Population (2016): 118,020
- Electors (2018): 92,715
- Area (km²): 37
- Pop. density (per km²): 3,189.7
- Census division: Toronto
- Census subdivision: Toronto

Etobicoke Centre is a provincial electoral district in Toronto, Ontario, Canada. It elects one member to the Legislative Assembly of Ontario. It was created in 1999 from parts of Etobicoke West and Etobicoke—Humber.

When the riding was created, it included all of Etobicoke south of a line following the 401 to Dixon Road to Royal York Road to La Rose Avenue and north of a line following Dundas Street to the 427 to Burnhamthorpe Road to Kipling Avenue to Mimico Creek to the Canadian Pacific Railway to Dundas Street.

In 2007, the northern border was altered to follow Dixon Road all the way to Humber River.

== Members of Provincial Parliament ==
Etobicoke Centre
Assembly	Years	Member	Party
Riding created from Etobicoke West and Etobicoke—Humber
37th	1999–2003	Chris Stockwell	Progressive Conservative
38th	2003–2007	Donna Cansfield	Liberal
39th	2007–2011	Donna Cansfield	Liberal
40th	2011–2014	Donna Cansfield	Liberal
41st	2014–2018	Yvan Baker	Liberal
42nd	2018–2022	Kinga Surma	Progressive Conservative
43rd	2022–present	Kinga Surma	Progressive Conservative
Sourced from the Ontario Legislative Assembly

== Election results ==
Winning party in each polling division of Etobicoke Centre at the 2025 Ontario general election

2025 Ontario general election
Party	Candidate	Votes	%	±%
Progressive Conservative	Kinga Surma	22,261	48.10	–0.49
Liberal	John Campbell	19,358	41.83	+7.78
New Democratic	Giulia Volpe	2,151	4.65	–3.96
Green	Brian Morris	1,000	2.16	–2.33
New Blue	Mario Bilusic	658	1.42	–1.04
Canadians' Choice	Paul Fromm	479	1.04	–
None of the Above	Richard M. Kiernicki	192	0.41	–0.02
Special Needs	Signe Miranda	180	0.39	–
Total valid votes		46,279	99.40	
Total rejected, unmarked and declined ballots		280	0.60	–0.04
Turnout		46,559	48.11	–0.43
Eligible voters		96,769		
Progressive Conservative hold		Swing		–4.13
Source: Elections Ontario

Winning party in each polling division of Etobicoke Centre at the 2022 Ontario general election

2022 Ontario general election
Party	Candidate	Votes	%	±%	Expenditures
Progressive Conservative	Kinga Surma	22,035	48.59	+5.59	$108,722
Liberal	Noel Semple	15,443	34.05	–0.63	$75,529
New Democratic	Heather Vickers-Wong	3,906	8.61	–9.53	$8,484
Green	Brian Maclean	2,036	4.49	+2.15	$1,932
New Blue	Cathy Habus	1,117	2.46	–	$3,160
Ontario Party	Mitchell Gilboy	530	1.17	–	$0
None of the Above	Richard M. Kiernicki	198	0.44	–	$0
Moderate	Genadij Zaitsev	86	0.19	–	$0
Total valid votes		45,351	99.36	–	$131,634
Total rejected, unmarked and declined ballots		294	0.64	–0.35	
Turnout		45,645	48.55	–13.36	
Eligible voters		94,024			
Progressive Conservative hold		Swing		+3.11	
Source: Elections Ontario

2018 Ontario general election
Party	Candidate	Votes	%	±%
Progressive Conservative	Kinga Surma	24,432	43.00	+10.58
Liberal	Yvan Baker	19,708	34.68	–14.02
New Democratic	Erica Kelly	10,311	18.15	+6.63
Green	Shawn Rizvi	1,329	2.34	–0.29
Canadians' Choice	Paul Fromm	631	1.11	–
Libertarian	Basil Mummery	252	0.44	–
Independent	Wallace Richards	162	0.29	–
Total valid votes		56,825	99.00	
Total rejected, unmarked and declined ballots		573	1.00	–0.42
Turnout		57,398	61.91	+5.43
Eligible voters		92,715		
Progressive Conservative notional gain from Liberal		Swing		+12.30
Source: Elections Ontario

2014 general election redistributed results
Party	Vote	%
Liberal	22,694	48.70
Progressive Conservative	15,104	32.41
New Democratic	5,368	11.52
Green	1,223	2.62
Others	2,210	4.74

2014 Ontario general election
Party	Candidate	Votes	%	±%
Liberal	Yvan Baker	23,848	50.28	–1.21
Progressive Conservative	Pina Martino	15,520	32.72	–0.06
New Democratic	Chris Jones	5,758	12.14	+0.16
Green	George Morrison	1,254	2.64	+0.68
Libertarian	Alexander T. Bussmann	528	1.11	+0.12
People's Political Party	John J. Martins	193	0.41	–
Freedom	Andrew Kuess	189	0.40	+0.14
Vegan Environmental	Felicia Trigiani	142	0.30	–
Total valid votes		47,432	98.59	
Total rejected, unmarked and declined ballots		680	1.41	+0.78
Turnout		48,112	56.47	+3.85
Eligible voters		85,192		
Liberal hold		Swing		–0.57
Source: Elections Ontario

2011 Ontario general election
Party	Candidate	Votes	%	±%
Liberal	Donna Cansfield	21,916	51.48	+1.41
Progressive Conservative	Mary Anne Demonte-Whelan	13,956	32.78	–1.42
New Democratic	Ana Maria Rivero	5,099	11.98	+3.58
Green	Cheryll San Juan	837	1.97	–5.36
Libertarian	Alexander T. Bussmann	422	0.99	–
Family Coalition	Liz Millican	231	0.54	–
Freedom	Marco Renda	108	0.25	–
Total valid votes		42,569	99.36	
Total rejected, unmarked and declined ballots		273	0.64	–0.16
Turnout		42,842	52.62	–6.78
Eligible voters		81,413		
Liberal hold		Swing		+1.41
Source: Elections Ontario

2007 Ontario general election
Party	Candidate	Votes	%	±%
Liberal	Donna Cansfield	22,939	50.07	+0.66
Progressive Conservative	Andy Pringle	15,667	34.20	–5.23
New Democratic	Anita Agrawal	3,847	8.40	+0.79
Green	Greg King	3,357	7.33	+3.78
Total valid votes		45,810	99.21	
Total rejected, unmarked and declined ballots		367	0.79	–0.11
Turnout		46,177	59.40	–3.09
Eligible voters		77,733		
Liberal hold		Swing		+2.94
Source: Elections Ontario

2003 Ontario general election
Party	Candidate	Votes	%	±%
Liberal	Donna Cansfield	22,070	49.41	+9.04
Progressive Conservative	Rose Andrachuk	17,610	39.43	–14.69
New Democratic	Margaret Anne McHugh	3,400	7.61	+4.84
Green	Ralph M. Chapman	1,584	3.55	+2.75
Total valid votes		44,664	99.10	
Total rejected, unmarked and declined ballots		406	0.90	+0.03
Turnout		45,070	62.50	–2.05
Eligible voters		72,114		
Liberal gain from Progressive Conservative		Swing		+11.87
Source: Elections Ontario

1999 Ontario general election
Party	Candidate	Votes	%	Expenditures
Progressive Conservative	Chris Stockwell	25,518	54.12	$49,034
Liberal	Agnes Ugolini Potts	19,035	40.37	$41,081
New Democratic	Bonte Minnema	1,309	2.78	$1,896
Family Coalition	Dan McCash	389	0.83	$31
Green	Christopher J. Morton	375	0.80	none listed
Natural Law	Geraldine Jackson	316	0.67	$0
Independent	Elaine Couto	209	0.44	$26
Total valid votes		47,151	99.13	
Total rejected, unmarked and declined ballots		414	0.87	
Turnout		47,565	64.55	
Eligible voters		73,691		
Progressive Conservative pickup new district.				
Source: Elections Ontario

== 2007 electoral reform referendum ==
2007 Ontario electoral reform referendum
Side	Votes	%
First Past the Post	28,457	65.3
Mixed member proportional	15,158	34.7
Total valid votes	43,615	100.0

== See also ==
- List of Ontario provincial electoral districts
- Canadian provincial electoral districts
