= 2026 Ontario Liberal Party leadership election =

Canadian provincial party leader election

- November 9–21, 2026

13255 points available 6627.5+ points votes needed to win
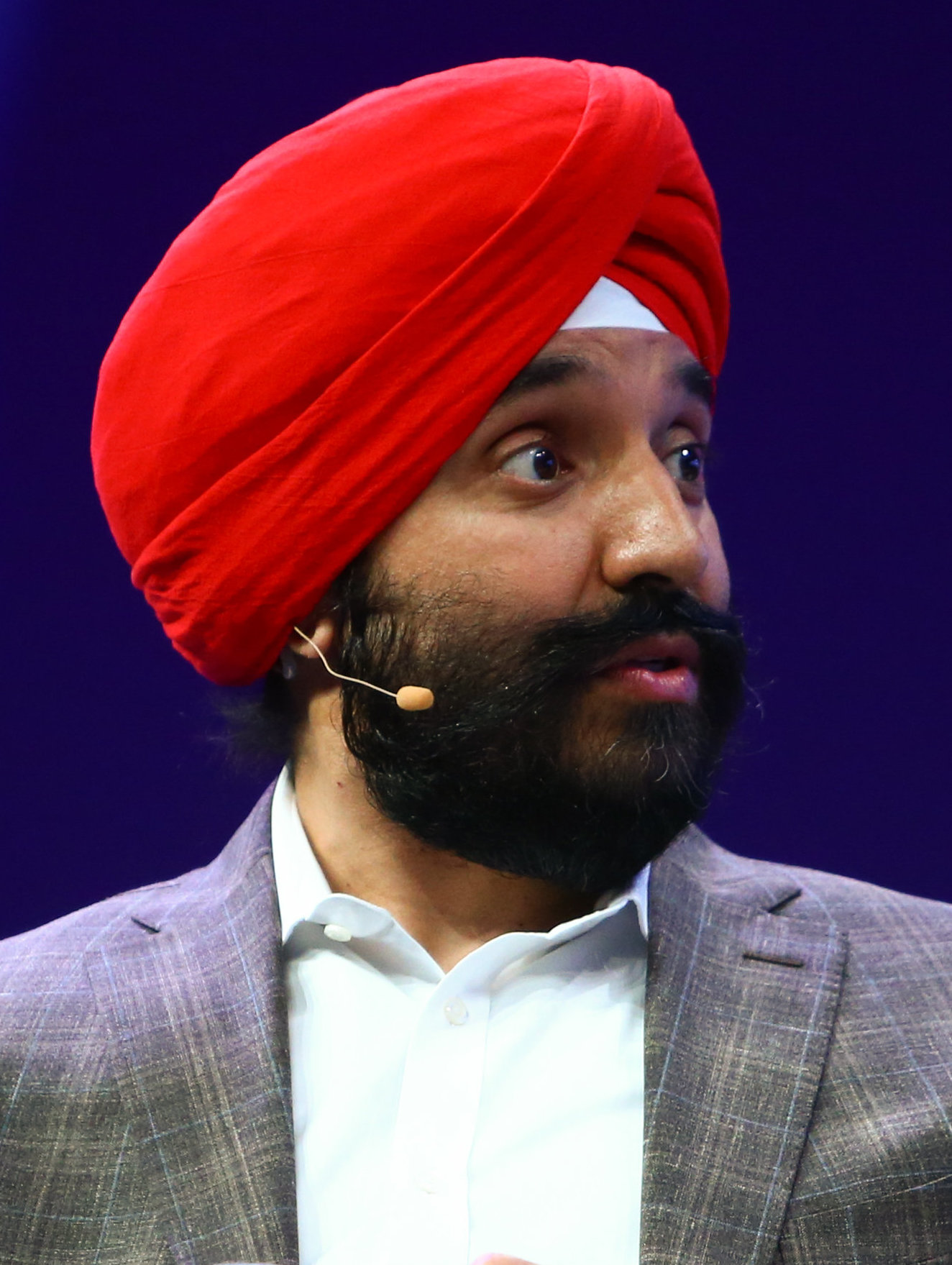

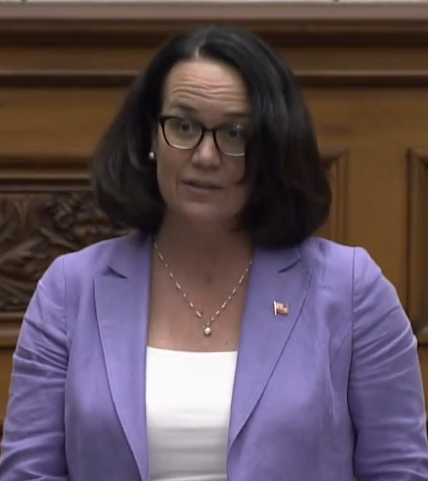

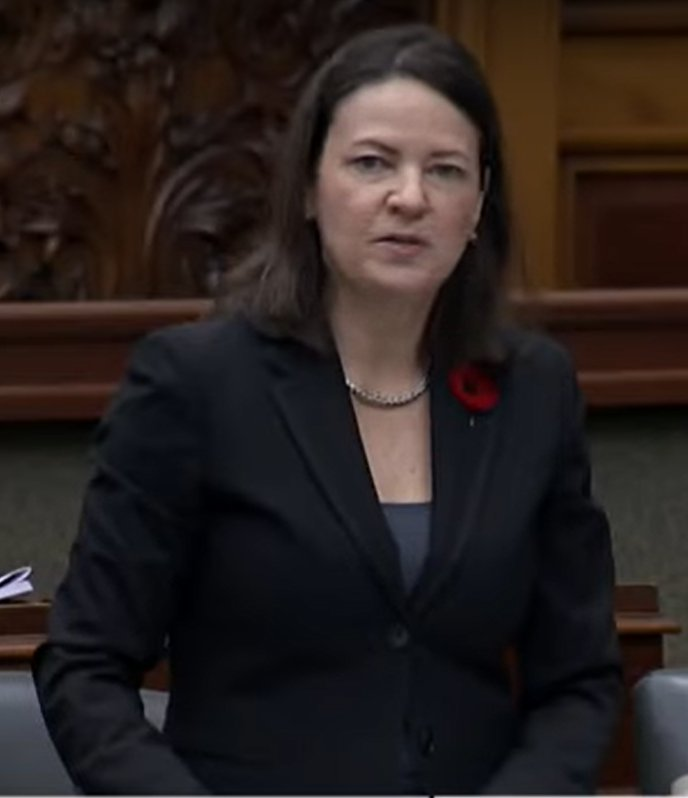
Candidate	Navdeep Bains	Lee Fairclough
3rd count	6,666.32 (50.29%)	6,588.68 (49.71%)
2nd count	6,107.70 (46.09%)	5,060.56 (38.19%)
1st count	5,848.21 (44.09%)	4,470.05 (33.70%)
Candidate	Stephanie Bowman	Dylan Marando
3rd count	Eliminated
2nd count	2,086.79 (15.73%)	Eliminated
1st count	1,703.37 (12.84%)	1233.37 (9.30%)
Previous Leader
John Fraser (interim)
Leader
Navdeep Bains

2026 Ontario Liberal Party leadership election
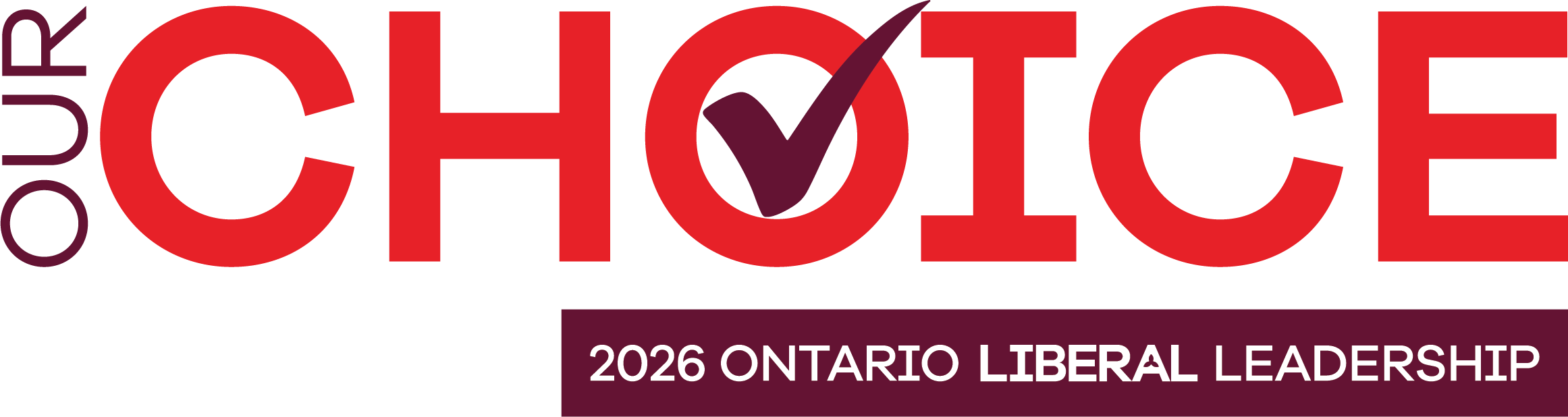
- Date: November 21, 2026
- Convention: Metro Toronto Convention Centre
- Resigning leader: Bonnie Crombie
- Won by: Navdeep Bains
- Ballots: 3
- Candidates: 5
- Entrance fee: $150,000
- Spending limit: $1,000,000

From November 9 to 20, 2026, members of the Ontario Liberal Party (OLP) voted in a leadership election to choose a permanent leader to replace John Fraser, who became leader on an interim basis following the resignation of Bonnie Crombie. The results of the election were announced on November 21 with Navdeep Bains elected leader.

== Background ==
Following an extended period of electoral success under the leadership of premiers Dalton McGuinty and Kathleen Wynne between 2003 and 2018, the Ontario Liberal Party experienced its worst electoral outcome since Confederation in the 2018 election. The party won less than 20% of the popular vote and fell to seven seats, losing official party status in the legislature. Accepting responsibility for the party's historic defeat, Wynne resigned as party leader on election night.

The party's two subsequent leaders, Steven Del Duca and Bonnie Crombie, were not sitting MPPs when they were elected leaders respectively in 2020 and 2023. Under their leadership, the party regained four percentage points and six percentage points of popular vote respectively in the 2022 and 2025 elections, and regained official party status following the 2025 election. However, neither were able to significantly expand the party's presence at the legislature or to secure a seat for themselves.

After the election, a group called New Leaf Liberals was formed in response to the performance of Crombie's leadership and her team. They openly advocated that Crombie should resign if she fails to receive 66% approval from party delegates during its leadership review. Crombie and her team pushed back by stating she should only resign if she failed to meet the 50% + 1 threshold as per the party constitution.

The party held a mandatory leadership review vote from September 12 to 14 during its 2025 annual meeting held in which Crombie secured only 57% approval from party delegates. Following the results announcement, Crombie stated that she would remain leader and fight the next provincial election during her closing address to the assembled delegates, but announced later on the same day her intention to resign following meetings with the party's caucus and executive council.

Crombie had initially announced that she would remain as leader until her successor was elected, but ultimately resigned from the position on January 14, 2026. Following Crombie's resignation, John Fraser, the most senior caucus member and the party's parliamentary leader since 2018, was selected as interim leader. Fraser had previously been interim leader on two occasions, from 2018 to 2020 and 2022 to 2023.

== Campaign ==
=== Rules and procedures ===
The rules and procedures of this leadership contest are primarily prescribed in three sources; the party's Constitution, in particular article 9 (Leadership Contest & Review) which was substantially amended in 2023, the party's Rules of Procedure, in particular chapter 8 (Leadership contest rules) which was specifically enacted by the party's executive council for this contest on February 7, 2026, and the Election Finances Act of Ontario, on matters relating to registration, financial reporting, and donation limits. Candidates cannot officially raise money until they are registered with Elections Ontario.

The registration fee for candidates was $150,000 and the cut-off date for applications to be submitted was July 31. Once the candidates are finalized, the party will begin all-candidate debates. Following a March 2023 constitutional amendment that ended the party's use of delegated leadership conventions, the contest is conducted via an online preferential ballot open to all party members registered by the September 7, 2026 cutoff date.

Results are determined by a weighted points system allocating 100 points to each provincial electoral district, distributed proportionally to candidates based on first-preference votes, alongside 50 points per recognized student club and 5 points per recognized women's club. If no candidate achieves 50 per cent of total points on the initial count, the lowest-ranked candidate is eliminated and their supporters' second-choice preferences are redistributed until a candidate secures a majority.

On October 1, the party announced that that the total number of individuals who would be eligible to vote in the leadership election would be approximately 55,000. This figure is lower than the number of eligible voters in the 2023 race. However, this reduction is credited to the party introducing a more stringent verification process, requiring members to complete two steps before being confirmed as eligible voters to ensure that those registered had actively chosen to participate in the leadership election, rather than simply having their names added to a membership list.

=== Messaging and platforms ===
Early contest messaging focused on affordability and the economy, with candidates putting forward varying approaches to address provincial living costs. Navdeep Bains framed his candidacy around an "Ontario Deal," emphasizing regional economic development, job creation, and housing access drawing on his background in federal industrial policy. Similarly, Stephanie Bowman prioritized youth employment, productivity growth, and fiscal management, while Dylan Marando proposed expanding OHIP coverage and restoring needs-based grants through OSAP.

Policy planks varied among campaigns during the opening months, with Eric Lombardi releasing the contest's first fully costed platform. Lombardi's platform focused on economic growth, housing supply, post-secondary tuition relief, and structural reforms to public service delivery, including introducing competitive incentives within the publicly funded healthcare system. Other candidates opted for broader policy frameworks and phased rollouts of specific planks leading up to official debates.

Governance and legislative readiness also formed a line of debate, with Lee Fairclough saying that it's important that the party's next leader should be a sitting Member of Provincial Parliament capable of confronting the governing Progressive Conservatives immediately in the Legislature. Drawing on her background in health administration, Fairclough also focused her policy proposals on healthcare access, mental health services, and restoring decision-making authority to municipal governments.

Debates among candidates for the 2026 Ontario Liberal Party leadership election
No.	Date	Place	Host	Moderator	Language	Participants: P Participant I Invited N Not invited A Absent invitee O Out of race				
No.	Date	Place	Host	Moderator	Language	Bains	Bowman	Fairclough	Lombardi	Marando
1	August 10, 2026	Online	Ontario Liberal Party	Tina Yazdani, The Trillium	English	P	P	P	P	P
2	September 17, 2026	Toronto	The Herle Burly podcast	David Herle	English	P	P	P	P	P
3	September 28, 2026	Online	Ontario Liberal Party	Siobhan Morris, CTV News	English	P	P	P	P	P
4	November 4, 2026	Toronto (William G. Davis Studio)	TVO Today Live	Steve Paikin	English	P	P	P	O	P

== Timeline ==
=== 2025 ===
- February 27 – Ontario general election held, resulting in a third consecutive majority PC government. The Liberals won 14 seats, obtaining official party status. Bonnie Crombie failed to win her own seat, but announced her intention to continue as leader in her concession speech.
- September 14 – At the Ontario Liberal Party Annual General Meeting, 57% of delegates voted against holding a leadership contest. Crombie announced during a speech to delegates after the results were announced that she would remain as leader. However, several hours later, after meeting with the party executive, she announced her intention to resign as leader once a leadership election was held to choose her successor.
- September 28 – The party's executive council approved the creation of a Leadership Vote Committee chaired by party treasurer Gabriel Sékaly and including party president Kathryn McGarry to "consult with members, research best practices and provide recommendations" for the upcoming leadership election.

=== 2026 ===
- January 14 – Bonnie Crombie officially resigns as Liberal leader.
- January 19 – MPP John Fraser, who previously served as interim leader from 2018 to 2020 and 2022 to 2023, is nominated by the Ontario Liberal caucus to serve as interim leader.
- January 22 – The party's executive council, riding association presidents and caucus formally confirm Fraser's selection as interim leader.
- February 7 – Party president Kathryn McGarry announces details of the leadership election, including the voting dates, entrance fee and timeline.
- April 21 – Dylan Marando announces his candidacy.
- May 8 – MPP Lee Fairclough declares her candidacy.
- May 9 – A Liberal nomination meeting is held for the Scarborough Southwest provincial by-election. Prospective leadership candidate Nate Erskine-Smith is defeated for the nomination by Ahsanul Hafiz. Erskine-Smith subsequently says his leadership candidacy is "much less likely" as a result.
- May 25 – Former federal cabinet minister Navdeep Bains declares his candidacy.
- May 28 – MPP Rob Cerjanec declares his candidacy.
- June 9 – Eric Lombardi declares his candidacy.
- June 25 – Erskine-Smith announces he will not be a leadership candidate.
- July 5 – Cerjanec announces he is suspending his campaign.
- July 31 – MPP Stephanie Bowman and Vikram Handa declare their candidacies, although Handa has not yet been officially qualified by the party. The deadline for candidate registration passes.
- August 7 – Handa announces his withdrawal from the contest.
- August 10 – The first leadership debate is held online, hosted by the Ontario Liberal Party and moderated by Tina Yazdani of The Trillium. All five remaining candidates participate.
- September 7 – Deadline to join the Ontario Liberal Party to be eligible to vote in the leadership election as a party member.
- September 17 – The second leadership debate is held in Toronto, hosted by David Herle on The Herle Burly podcast. All five candidates participate.
- September 28 – The third leadership debate is held online, hosted by the Ontario Liberal Party and moderated by Siobhan Morris of CTV News. All five candidates participate.
- September 30 – Eric Lombardi withdraws from the leadership election.
- November 4 – The fourth leadership debate was hosted by TVO Today Live at the William G. Davis Studio in Toronto, moderated by Steve Paikin. The four remaining candidates participated.
- November 9 – Voting period begins.
- November 20 – Voting period ends.
- November 21 – Results of voting and the new leader were announced at an event held at the Metro Toronto Convention Centre.

== Candidates ==
=== Registered ===
Candidate	Experience	Candidacy	Campaign	Ref.
Navdeep Bains	Federal Minister of Innovation, Science and Industry (2015–2021); MP for Mississauga—Malton (2015–2021); MP for Mississauga—Brampton South (2004–2011); Business executive at CIBC and Rogers Communications	Announced: May 25, 2026 Registered: May 23, 2026 Campaign slogan: Let's Lead Again	Endorsements; Website	
Stephanie Bowman	MPP for Don Valley West (2022–present); Liberal Critic for Finance (2024—present); Liberal Deputy House Leader and Critic for Treasury Board, Interprovincial Trade, Tariffs, and International Trade (2025—present); Bank of Canada board member (2018—2021); Senior vice-president of Scotiabank (2014—2017)	Announced: July 31, 2026 Registered: August 2, 2026 Campaign slogan: Ready for What's Next	Endorsements Website	
Lee Fairclough	MPP for Etobicoke—Lakeshore (2025–present); Liberal Critic for Hospitals, Addictions and Homelessness, and Mental Health (2025—present); President of St. Mary's General Hospital, Kitchener (2019–2022); Senior vice-president of clinical care at the Centre for Addiction and Mental Health, Toronto	Announced: May 8, 2026 Registered: May 7, 2026 Campaign slogan: Fighting for a Better Ontario	Endorsements; Website	
Dylan Marando	Former policy advisor to Premiers Dalton McGuinty and Kathleen Wynne, deputy director of policy in the Prime Minister's Office of Justin Trudeau; Head of strategy and government affairs for Siemens Healthineers; Green Party candidate in 2008 federal election.	Announced: April 21, 2026 Registered: April 21, 2026 Campaign slogan: The Future Starts Here	Endorsements; Website	

=== Withdrawn ===
Candidate	Experience	Candidacy	Campaign	Ref.
Rob Cerjanec	MPP for Ajax (2025–present); Liberal Critic for Economic Development & Innovation, and Tourism, Sport & Culture (2025–present); Communication lead at the Durham District School Board; Chief of Staff to Deputy Mayor of Toronto Ana Bailão (2015—2019)	Announced: May 28, 2026 Registered: May 28, 2026 Withdrawn: July 5, 2026 Campaign slogan: Let's Build Ontario	Endorsements; Website	
Vikram Handa	2015 Liberal Party of Canada nomination contestant in Davenport; Director at the Maya Group, an affordable housing provider	Announced: July 31, 2026 Registered: N/A Withdrawn: August 7, 2026 Campaign slogan:	Website	
Eric Lombardi	Financial technology sector management consultant; Chair of Build Toronto; Founder of More Neighbours Toronto.	Announced: June 9, 2026 Registered: June 8, 2026 Withdrawn: September 30, 2026 Campaign slogan: Own the Future	Endorsements; Website	

=== Declined ===
- Yvan Baker, MP for Etobicoke Centre (2019—present), MPP for Etobicoke Centre (2014–2018)
- Andrew Boozary, physician, executive director of the Gattuso Centre for Social Medicine
- Mike Crawley, president of the Liberal Party of Canada (2012—2014), CEO of AIM PowerGen Corporation (2002—2009), CEO of Northland Power (2018—2024)
- Nate Erskine-Smith, MP for Beaches—East York (2015–present), federal Minister of Housing, Infrastructure and Communities (2024–2025), finished second in the 2023 leadership election.
- John Fraser, interim leader (2018–2020, 2022–2023, 2026), parliamentary leader (2018–present), MPP for Ottawa South (2013–present)
- Vince Gasparro, MP for Eglinton—Lawrence (2025–present)
- Karina Gould, MP for Burlington (2015–present), federal Government House Leader (2023–2025), federal Minister of Families, Children and Social Development (2021–2023), federal Minister of International Development (2019–2021), federal Minister of Democratic Institutions (2017–2019), finished third in the 2025 federal leadership election
- Ted Hsu, MPP for Kingston and the Islands (2022–present), MP for Kingston and the Islands (2011–2015), finished fourth in the 2023 leadership election (endorsed Fairclough)
- Jeff Lehman, chair of the District of Muskoka (2022–present), Mayor of Barrie (2010–2022)
- Danielle Martin, MP for University—Rosedale (2026–present), professor at the University of Toronto Faculty of Medicine.
- Josh Matlow, Toronto City Councillor for Ward 12-Toronto-St. Paul's (2010–present), candidate for Mayor of Toronto (2023), Liberal candidate in Dufferin—Peel—Wellington—Grey (2002).
- Marco Mendicino, Chief of Staff to the Prime Minister (2025), federal Minister of Public Safety (2021–2023), federal Minister of Immigration, Refugees and Citizenship (2019–2021), MP for Eglinton—Lawrence (2015–2025)
- Yasir Naqvi, MP for Ottawa Centre (2021–present), finished third in the 2023 leadership election (endorsed Bains)
- Adil Shamji, MPP for Don Valley East (2022–present), withdrawn candidate during the 2023 leadership election
- Tyler Watt, MPP for Nepean (2025–present) (endorsed Fairclough)

== Endorsements ==
Navdeep Bains

MPPs

- Andrea Hazell, MPP for Scarborough—Guildwood (2023–present)

MPs

- Mona Fortier, Parliamentary Secretary to the Minister of Foreign Affairs (2025–present), Chief Government Whip (2024–2025), Cabinet minister in the J. Trudeau ministry (2019–2023), MP for Ottawa—Vanier—Gloucester (2017–present)
- Iqwinder Gaheer, MP for Mississauga—Malton (2021–present)
- Mark Gerretsen, Chief Government Whip (2025–present), Deputy Leader of the Government in the House of Commons (2023–2025), MP for Kingston and the Islands (2015–present), Mayor of Kingston (2010–2014)
- Karina Gould, Cabinet minister in the J. Trudeau ministry (2017–2025), Parliamentary Secretary to the Minister of International Development (2015–2017), MP for Burlington (2015–present)
- Arielle Kayabaga, Deputy Leader of the Government in the House of Commons (2025–present), Cabinet minister in the Carney ministry (2025), MP for London West (2021–present)
- Yasir Naqvi, Parliamentary Secretary (2023–present), MP for Ottawa Centre (2021–present), Ontario cabinet minister in the Wynne ministry (2013–2018), MPP for Ottawa Centre (2007–2018)

Former MPPs

- Brad Duguid, Ontario cabinet minister in the McGuinty and Wynne ministries (2007–2018), MPP for Scarborough Centre (2003–2018)
Stephanie Bowman

MPPs

- Stephen Blais, MPP for Orléans (2020–present), Ottawa City Councillor (2010–2020)
- Rob Cerjanec, MPP for Ajax (2025–present), withdrawn candidate in this election
- Karen McCrimmon, MPP for Kanata—Carleton (2023–present), Parliamentary Secretary (2015–2019), MP for Kanata—Carleton (2015–2021)
- Mary-Margaret McMahon, MPP for Beaches—East York (2022–present)

Former MPPs/MPs

- Elinor Caplan, Cabinet minister in the Chrétien ministry (1999–2003), Parliamentary Secretary to the Minister of Health (1998–1999), MP for Thornhill (1997–2004), Ontario cabinet minister in the Peterson ministry (1985–1986, 1987–1990), MPP for Oriole (1985–1997)
- Sheila Copps, Deputy Prime Minister of Canada (1993–1997), Cabinet minister in the Chrétien ministry (1993–2003), MP for Hamilton East (1984–2004), MPP for Hamilton Centre (1981–1984)
Rob Cerjanec (withdrawn)

MPPs

- Stephanie Bowman, MPP for Don Valley West (2022–present)

Former MPPs

- Granville Anderson, MPP for Durham (2014–2018)
Lee Fairclough

MPPs

- Lucille Collard, MPP for Ottawa—Vanier (2020–present)
- Ted Hsu, MPP for Kingston and the Islands (2022–present), MP for Kingston and the Islands (2011–2015)
- Stephanie Smyth, MPP for Toronto—St. Paul's (2025–present)
- Tyler Watt, MPP for Nepean (2025–present)

MPs

- Charles Sousa, Parliamentary Secretary to the Minister of Public Services and Procurement (2023–2025), MP for Mississauga—Lakeshore (2022–present), Ontario cabinet minister in the McGuinty and Wynne ministries (2010–2018), MPP for Mississauga South (2007–2018)
- James Maloney, National Liberal Caucus Chair, MP for Etobicoke—Lakeshore (2015–present)

Former MPPs

- Murray Elston, Leader of the Opposition and interim Liberal leader (1991), Ontario cabinet minister in the Peterson ministry (1985–1990), MPP for Huron—Bruce (1981–1994), runner-up in the 1992 Ontario Liberal Party leadership election
- Deb Matthews, Deputy Premier of Ontario (2013–2018), Ontario cabinet minister in the McGuinty and Wynne ministries (2007–2018), MPP for London North Centre (2003–2018)
- Lyn McLeod, Leader of the Opposition and Leader of the Liberal Party of Ontario (1992–1996), Ontario cabinet minister in the Peterson ministry (1987–1990), MPP for Fort William and Thunder Bay—Atikokan (1987–2003)
- George Smitherman, 8th Deputy Premier of Ontario (2006–2009), Ontario cabinet minister in the McGuinty ministry (2003–2009), MPP for Toronto Centre (1999–2010)
- Greg Sorbara, Ontario cabinet minister in the Peterson and McGuinty ministries (1985–1990, 2003–2005, 2006–2007), MPP for Vaughan and Vaughan—King—Aurora (2001–2012) and York North and York Centre (1985–1997), Ontario Liberal Party President (1999–2004), Chancellor of York University (2014–2023)
- Kathleen Wynne, 25th Premier of Ontario (2013–2018), Ontario cabinet minister in the McGuinty ministry (2006–2012), MPP for Don Valley West (2003–2022)

Former MPs

- John Manley, Deputy Prime Minister of Canada (2002–2003), Cabinet minister in the Chrétien ministry (1993–2003), MP for Ottawa South (1988–2004)

Other prominent individuals

- Eric Lombardi, Chair of Build Toronto, Founder of More Neighbours Toronto, withdrawn candidate in this election
Eric Lombardi (withdrawn)

MPs

- Matt Strauss, Conservative MP for Kitchener South—Hespeler (2025–present)
Dylan Marando

MPs

- Jean-Yves Duclos, Cabinet minister in the J. Trudeau ministry (2015–2025), MP for Québec Centre (2015–present)

Former MPPs

- Chris Ballard, Ontario cabinet minister in the Wynne ministry (2016–2018), MPP for Newmarket—Aurora (2014–2018)

Former MPs

- Mac Harb, Senator from Ontario (2003–2013), MP for Ottawa Centre (1988–2003)
- Bob Nault, Minister of Indian Affairs and Northern Development (1999–2003), Parliamentary Secretary (1996–1997), MP for Kenora (1988–2004, 2015–2019)
- Deb Schulte, Minister of Seniors (2019–2021), Parliamentary Secretary to the Minister of National Revenue (2018–2019), MP for King—Vaughan (2015–2021)
- Adam Vaughan, MP for Spadina—Fort York (2015–2021)

Other prominent individuals

- Ben Chin, political adviser and former journalist

== Opinion polls ==
Polling company	Ref	Date	Sample group	Fairclough	Bains	Bowman	Marando	Lombardi	None
Liaison Strategies		15–19 September 2026	All Ontarians	27%	23%	15%	7%	12%	17%
Liaison Strategies		15–19 September 2026	Liberal supporters	28%	35%	16%	5%	11%	4%
Liaison Strategies		15–19 September 2026	Undecided voters	33%	14%	13%	9%	13%	18%

== Results ==
= Eliminated from next round
= Winner

Results by round
Candidate	1st round		2nd round				3rd round			
Candidate	Points	Votes	Points	+/−	Votes	+/−	Points	+/−	Votes	+/−
Navdeep Bains	5,848.21 44.12%	9148 44.85%	6,107.70 46.08%	+259.49 +1.96 pp	9346 46.53%	+198 +1.68 pp	6,666.32 50.29%	+558.62 +4.21 pp	9961 50.74%	+615 +4.21 pp
Lee Fairclough	4,470.05 33.72%	6995 34.29%	5,060.56 38.18%	+590.51 +4.45 pp	7722 38.44%	+727 +4.15 pp	6,588.68 49.71%	+1,528.12 +11.53 pp	9669 49.26%	+1947 +10.81 pp
Stephanie Bowman	1,703.37 12.85%	2580 12.65%	2,086.79 15.74%	+383.42 +2.89 pp	3018 15.03%	+438 +2.38 pp	Eliminated			
Dylan Marando	1,233.37 9.30%	1674 8.21%	Eliminated							
Total	13,255.00	20,397	13,255.05	+0.05	20,086	-311	13,255.00	−0.05	19,630	-456

Sankey diagram of results round-to-round

First round
Bains	44.12%
Fairclough	33.72%
Bowman	12.85%
Marando	9.30%

Final round
Bains	50.29%
Fairclough	49.71%
