= David Herle =

Canadian political consultant

David Herle is a Canadian political consultant.

Herle received his Bachelor of Arts from the University of Regina and was called to the Bar in Ontario after receiving his LLB from the University of Saskatchewan.

Herle worked on John Turner's leadership bid.

Herle, a partner with Rubicon Strategy, was previously a senior partner at Earnscliffe Strategy Group and a top advisor to former Prime Minister Paul Martin. He was Liberal Party of Canada campaign co-chair for 2004 and 2006. During the 2004 election, as prospects for the Liberals began looking poor, Herle was a strong advocate of attacking Martin's primary opponent, Stephen Harper. In the 2006 election, a similar strategy did not result in similar success.

Herle was managing co-chair for Ontario Premier Kathleen Wynne's successful reelection campaign in 2014 and again in 2018 when the Ontario Liberals finished in third place. During the several years that Herle worked for the Ontario Liberal government, his firm was paid $3.4 million.

David Herle is host of The Herle Burly podcast.
