= York Mills (electoral district) =

Former provincial electoral district in Ontario, Canada

Ontario electoral district

Defunct provincial electoral district
- Legislature: Legislative Assembly of Ontario
- District created: 1963
- District abolished: 1996
- First contested: 1963
- Last contested: 1995

Demographics
- Census division: Toronto
- Census subdivision: Toronto

York Mills was a provincial electoral district in Ontario, Canada. It was created prior to the 1963 provincial election from the northern part of York East and eliminated in 1996, when its territory was incorporated into the riding of Don Valley West.

== Members of Provincial Parliament ==
Parliament	Years	Member	Party
Created from York East riding in 1963
27th	1963–1967	Dalton Bales	Progressive Conservative
30th	1967–1971	Dalton Bales	Progressive Conservative
29th	1971–1975	Dalton Bales	Progressive Conservative
30th	1975–1977	Bette Stephenson	Progressive Conservative
31st	1977–1981	Bette Stephenson	Progressive Conservative
32nd	1981–1985	Bette Stephenson	Progressive Conservative
33rd	1985–1987	Bette Stephenson	Progressive Conservative
34th	1987–1990	Brad Nixon	Liberal
35th	1990–1995	David Turnbull	Progressive Conservative
36th	1995–1999	David Turnbull	Progressive Conservative
		Sourced from the Ontario Legislative Assembly	
Merged into Don Valley West riding after 1999

== Election results ==
1963 Ontario general election
Party	Candidate	Votes	Vote %
Conservative	Dalton Bales	16,423	57.5
Liberal	James Ditson Service	7,989	28.0
New Democrat	Douglas Peterson	4,166	14.6
	Total	28,578	

1967 Ontario general election
Party	Candidate	Votes	Vote %
Conservative	Dalton Bales	22,328	49.6
Liberal	Barnett Danson	16,352	36.3
New Democrat	Audrie Tucker	6,327	14.1
	Total	45,007	

1971 Ontario general election
Party	Candidate	Votes (Note: 346 out of 356 polls reporting.)	Vote %
Conservative	Dalton Bales	40,037	58.7
Liberal	Don Brill	18,148	26.6
New Democrat	Mike Morrone	10,047	14.7
	Total	68,232	

1975 Ontario general election
Party	Candidate	Votes	Vote %
Conservative	Bette Stephenson	17,921	45.7
Liberal	Bruce Bone	14,077	35.9
New Democrat	Allan Millard	7,252	18.5
	Total	39,250	

1977 Ontario general election
Party	Candidate	Votes	Vote %
Conservative	Bette Stephenson	21,656	58.3
Liberal	Wilfred Caplan	9,614	25.9
New Democrat	Allan Millard	5,071	13.7
Independent	Donald Gordon	462	1.2
Libertarian	Scott Bell	332	0.9
	Total	37,135	

1981 Ontario general election
Party	Candidate	Votes	Vote %
Conservative	Bette Stephenson	20,858	65.8
Liberal	Isadore Weinberg	5,630	17.8
New Democrat	David Crisp	3,936	12.4
Libertarian	Scott Bell	1,276	4.0
	Total	31,700	

1985 Ontario general election
Party	Candidate	Votes	Vote %
Conservative	Bette Stephenson	18,010	47.9
Liberal	Gunner Tannis	10,110	26.9
New Democrat	Gord Doctorow	6,925	18.4
Libertarian	Scott Bell	2,517	6.7
	Total	37,562	

1987 Ontario general election
Party	Candidate	Votes	Vote %
Liberal	Brad Nixon	14,228	47.3
Conservative	Gordon Chong	11,979	39.9
New Democrat	Steve Shorter	3,267	10.9
Libertarian	Joe Kyriakakis	585	1.9
	Total	25,954	

1990 Ontario general election
Party	Candidate	Votes	Vote %
Conservative	David Turnbull	13,037	44.6
Liberal	Brad Nixon	10,382	35.5
New Democrat	Marcia McVea	4,889	16.7
Green	Janet Creory	577	2.0
Libertarian	Mary-Anne Sikamea	354	1.2
	Total	29,239	

1995 Ontario general election
Party	Candidate	Votes	Vote %
Conservative	David Turnbull	18,852	63.6
Liberal	David MacNaughton	7,318	24.7
New Democrat	Lesley Durham	2,930	9.9
Libertarian	Mark Meschino	223	0.8
Natural Law	Debbie Weberg	173	0.6
Green	Marion Wyse	157	0.5
	Total	29,653	

== See also ==
- List of Ontario provincial electoral districts
- Canadian provincial electoral districts
