= David Turnbull (politician) =

Canadian politician

The Honourable David Turnbull ECO

Member of the Ontario Provincial Parliament for Don Valley West (York Mills; 1990–1999)
- In office September 6, 1990 – October 2, 2003
- Preceded by: Brad Nixon
- Succeeded by: Kathleen Wynne

Personal details
- Born: March 17, 1942 (age 84) Newcastle upon Tyne, England
- Party: Progressive Conservative
- Occupation: Manager

David Turnbull (born March 17, 1942) is a former Canadian politician in Ontario, Canada. He was a Progressive Conservative member of the Legislative Assembly of Ontario from 1990 to 2003 and was a candidate for the Conservative Party of Canada in the federal election of 2004.

== Background ==
Turnbull was educated at the Edinburgh College of Domestic Sciences, and worked as a hotel manager in Scotland, Switzerland and Germany. Upon moving to Canada, he continued his education at the Canadian Institute of Management. Before entering public life, he served as a manager for Xerox Canada Ltd. and as President of Turnbull Luetolf Ltd. He also became involved in conservative citizens' groups, including the Ratepayers' Association and the Citizens for Property Tax Reform.

== Politics ==
Turnbull was elected to the provincial legislature in the 1990 provincial election, defeating incumbent Liberal Brad Nixon by about 3,000 votes in the North York riding of York Mills. The election was won by the New Democratic Party, and Turnbull sat in the opposition benches for the next five years.

The Tories won a majority government in the provincial election of 1995, and Turnbull was re-elected by more than 11,000 votes over his nearest opponent. He was appointed Government Whip in 1995, and retained this position on being named a Minister without Portfolio in Mike Harris's government on October 10, 1997.

In 1999, Turnbull was re-elected in the redistributed Don Valley West riding, outpolling Liberal candidate Paul Davidson by over 3,000 votes.

On June 17, 1999, Turnbull was promoted to Minister of Transportation, and on February 8, 2001, was named to the position of Solicitor General. In the latter capacity, he was responsible for creating the province's first Sex Offender Registry.

When Ernie Eves succeeded Harris as Premier of Ontario on April 15, 2002, he named Turnbull as his Associate Minister of Enterprise, Opportunity and Innovation. Turnbull held this position until the defeat of the Eves government in the 2003 provincial election. Turnbull was among the Tory incumbents defeated in the 2003 election, falling to Liberal candidate Kathleen Wynne by over 6,000 votes.

Turnbull sought election to House of Commons of Canada for the federal Don Valley West riding the following year, but was defeated by Liberal incumbent John Godfrey.

=== Cabinet positions ===
Eves ministry, Province of Ontario (2002–2003)
Sub-Cabinet Post
| Predecessor | Title | Successor |
|---|---|---|
| | Associate Minister of Enterprise, Opportunity and Innovation (2002–2003) | |
Harris ministry, Province of Ontario (1995–2002)
Cabinet posts (2)
| Predecessor | Office | Successor |
| David Tsubouchi | Solicitor General; 2001–2002 | Bob Runciman (Note: Renamed as Minister of Public Safety and Security.) |
| Tony Clement | Minister of Transportation; 1999–2001 | Brad Clark |
Special Parliamentary Responsibilities
| Predecessor | Title | Successor |
| Fred Wilson | Chief Government Whip; 1995–1999 | Frank Klees |
