= Grand River Hospital =

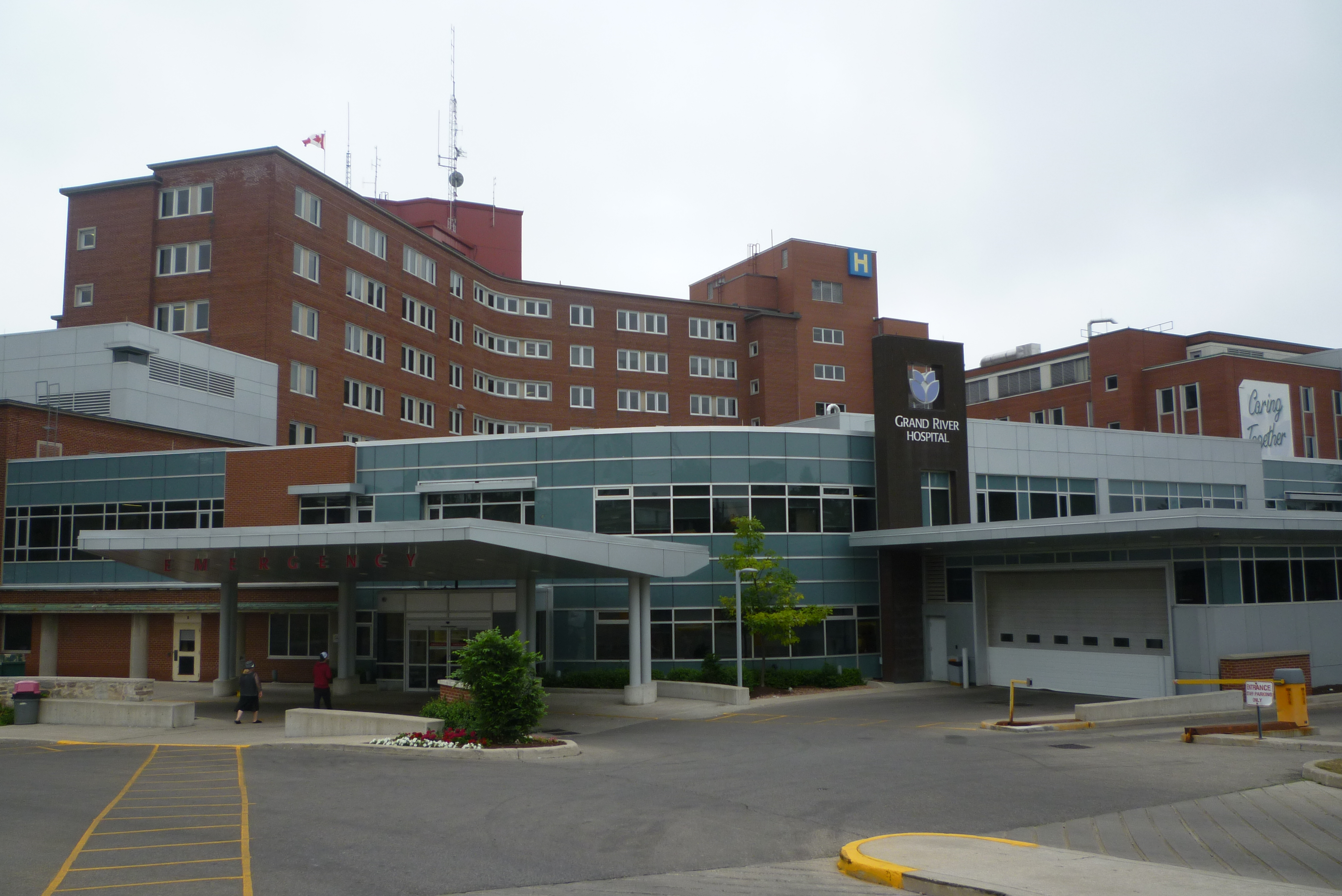
- KW Health Centre of the Grand River Hospital

Geography
- Location: Kitchener, Ontario, Canada
- Coordinates: 43.4564°N 80.5122°W

Organization
- Care system: Public Medicare (Canada)
- Type: General (KW), chronic care (Freeport)
- Affiliated university: Conestoga College, Michael G. DeGroote School of Medicine, McMaster University

Services
- Emergency department: Yes
- Beds: 665

History
- Founded: 1995

Links
- Website: http://www.grhosp.on.ca/
- Lists: Hospitals in Canada

Grand River Hospital is a hospital located in Kitchener, Ontario, Canada. The hospital operates two campuses, Kitchener-Waterloo Health Centre and Freeport Health Centre, which were independent hospitals that merged to form Grand River Hospital in April 1995.

The hospital has over 650 beds and 15 specialized programs and services: surgery, children's program, childbirth, medical imaging, mental health and addictions, withdrawal management, medicine, stroke, complex continuing care, rehabilitation, cancer, critical care, renal, emergency, pharmacy and lab. The hospital also provides renal dialysis and cancer satellite programs in Guelph, Palmerston, Fergus and Mt Forest Centre in Guelph, along with the Hazelglen Outreach Mental Health service in Kitchener.

On September 22, 2019, Grand River Hospital integrated all of their systems into a new central computer system in order to improve efficiency for patient care.

On April 1, 2025, Grand River merged with St. Mary's General Hospital to form the Waterloo Regional Health Network. The new name of the KW Site is WRHN @ Midtown, and the Freeport Site is WRHN @ Chicopee.

== Hospitals ==
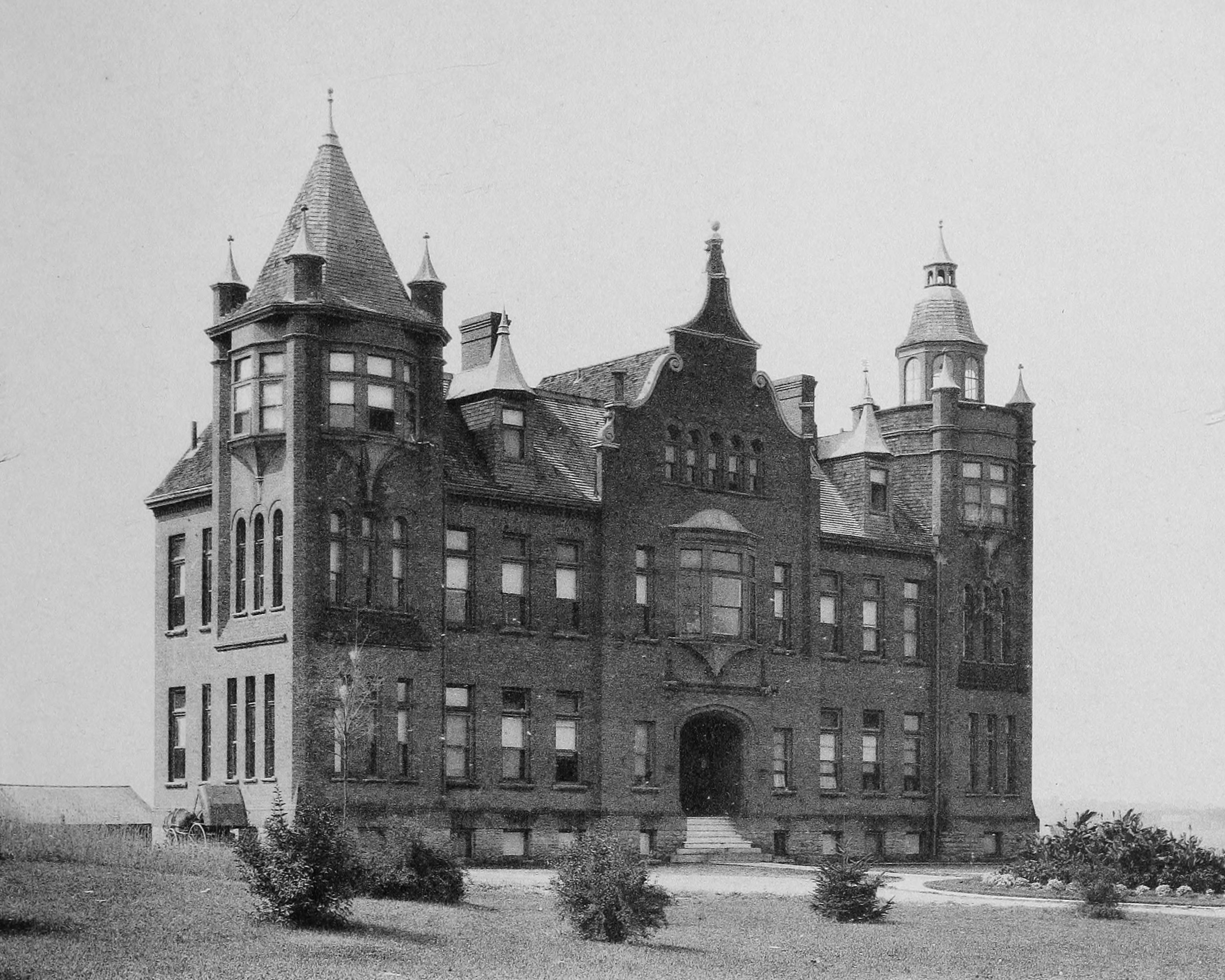
Photograph of the original 1895 hospital, designed by Edgar Beaumont Jarvis.

=== KW Site ===
The KW Site of Grand River Hospital was previously known as the Berlin-Waterloo Hospital, Kitchener-Waterloo Hospital (K-W Hospital) and the K-W Health Centre.

The K-W Hospital was founded in 1895 as a community hospital to serve the cities of Kitchener and Waterloo. The initial capacity of the Hospital was 70 beds. The Hospital expanded in 1913 and grew until 1920. A substantial deficit in 1919, in part due to rising costs of healthcare, made the financial situation of the Hospital unstable. Consequently, the Hospital almost closed in 1923. Kitchener and Waterloo jointly formed the K-W Hospital Commission in 1924 and the Hospital became municipally owned.

In 1901, the Hospital established one of the first ambulance services in the province. In 1936, the Hospital added a pathology lab. K-W Hospital received accredited by the American College of Surgeons in 1943. In 1951, the Hospital underwent a major expansion project. In 1970, the Hospital expanded once again with a new maternity unit.

As the K-W Health Centre the Hospital merged with Freeport in 1995 to form the Grand River Hospital Corporation.

It is located on King Street West, near the Waterloo border, the Ion rapid transit light rail station and the former location of the CTV Kitchener studios. The Grand River Regional Cancer Centre opened at this site in 2003.

=== Freeport Site ===
The Freeport Site of Grand River Hospital was previously known as the Freeport Sanitorium. It is located on King Street East on the shore of the Grand River. It was a tuberculosis sanatorium in the early 20th century, and in the late 1980s was transformed into a regional chronic care facility, as a new structure was built onto the previous one, expanding it. Complex continuing care, rehabilitation and the Waterloo-Wellington breast centre are located at this site. In November 2010, a new Specialized Mental Health program opened at Freeport, with all clinical practice based on the Recovery philosophy. This service is for patients living with severe and persistent mental illness, who would have previously been sent to London, Ontario.

The unique architecture of Freeport Centre is award winning; "its overall planning concept of simulating a village, complete with a courtyard cum town square, [distinguishes] it from many of its predecessors in long-term care architecture." This has made it attractive as a filming location, as seen in two movies, Away from Her, directed by Sarah Polley; and Cold Creek Manor, directed by Mike Figgis.

== Mental health ==
Withdrawal Management, located near the KW site at 52 Glasgow, Grand River Hospital supports the only withdrawal management centre within Waterloo-Wellington Regions. This facility has 24 hour monitoring of non-medical withdrawal for men and women, and a day program to help individuals maintain abstinence and help to transition to other community supports.
