= Brad Nixon =

Canadian politician

Ontario MPP
- In office 1987–1990
- Preceded by: Bette Stephenson
- Succeeded by: David Turnbull
- Constituency: York Mills

Personal details
- Born: John Bradford Nixon; June 28, 1949 (age 76) Toronto, Ontario, Canada
- Party: Liberal
- Spouse: Carol Beckmann
- Occupation: Lawyer

John Bradford Nixon (born June 28, 1949) is a former politician in Ontario, Canada. He served in the Legislative Assembly of Ontario as a Liberal from 1987 to 1990.

== Background ==
Nixon was educated at the University of Toronto, Osgoode Hall Law School and York University. He was a lawyer before entering political life. He is married to Carol Beckmann-Nixon and lives in Niagara-on-the-Lake.

== Politics ==
He was elected to the Ontario legislature in the 1987 provincial election, defeating Progressive Conservative Gordon Chong by over 2,000 votes in the Toronto riding of York Mills. He was a backbench supporter of David Peterson's government for the next three years. He served as parliamentary assistant to the Minister of Financial Institutions in 1987-88, and parliamentary assistant to the Minister of Housing in 1988-89.

The Liberals were defeated by the Ontario New Democratic Party in the 1990 election. Nixon lost his seat to David Turnbull of the Progressive Conservatives by over 2,500 votes.

== After politics ==
Nixon later worked as executive director for the office of the party leader, but left the position in 1992 after Lyn McLeod was elected leader. He prepared a water power brief for the Independent Power Producers' Society of Ontario in 1996.

Since 1992, he has practised law in the fields of property tax and assessment. He was a partner in the firm of Poole Milligan, and has served on the Ontario chapter of the Canadian Property Tax Association. He then became a partner in the firm of Walker Poole Nixon. When that firm dissolved he became a partner in Nixon Fleet and Poole LLP.
