= Stephanie Bowman =

Canadian politician

Stephanie Bowman MPP
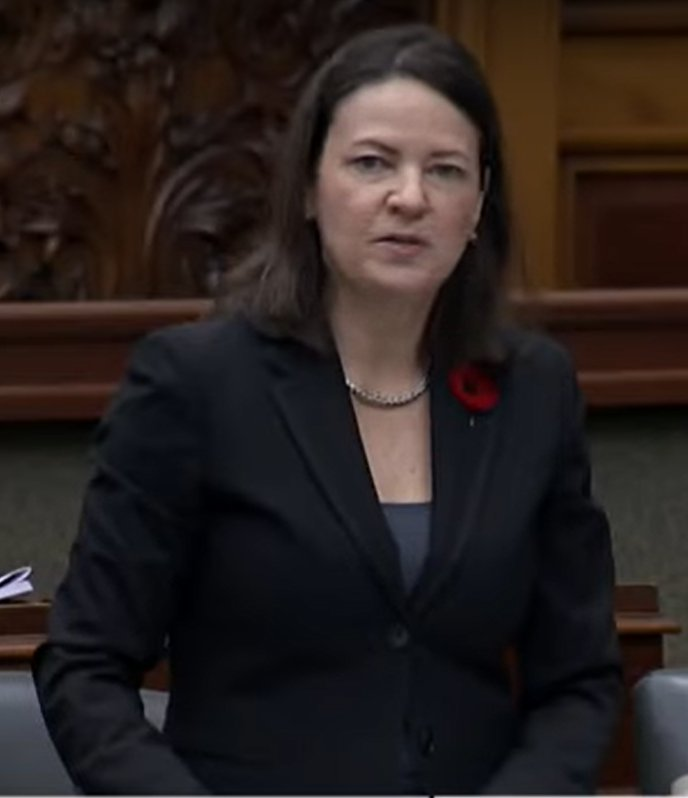
- Bowman in November 2022

Member of the Ontario Provincial Parliament for Don Valley West
- Incumbent
- Assumed office June 2, 2022
- Preceded by: Kathleen Wynne

Personal details
- Party: Liberal

Stephanie Bowman is a Canadian politician, who was elected to the Legislative Assembly of Ontario in the 2022 provincial election and re-elected in 2025 with 57% of the vote. She represents the riding of Don Valley West as a member of the Ontario Liberal Party.

== Career before politics ==
Before entering provincial politics, Bowman worked in the financial services sector. She was a partner at Ernst & Young and later held senior positions at Scotiabank, where she worked for nine years and served as senior vice-president of structural cost transformation.

In June 2018, federal finance minister Bill Morneau appointed Bowman to the board of directors of the Bank of Canada.

== Political career ==
Bowman entered provincial politics in 2021. On October 13, she was nominated as the Ontario Liberal Party candidate in Don Valley West for the 2022 Ontario general election. She ran in the seat of former Ontario premier Kathleen Wynne, who was not seeking re-election. In the general election, she defeated the PC candidate and former Toronto police chief, Mark Saunders.

Following the resignation of Steven Del Duca as Ontario Liberal leader, Bowman considered running in the 2023 Ontario Liberal Party leadership election. In February 2023, she confirmed that she was exploring a leadership bid. Bowman ultimately did not enter the race. In June 2023, she endorsed Bonnie Crombie for the leadership and became a co-chair of Crombie's campaign.

In 2024, Bowman introduced a private member's bill called the Cutting Taxes on Small Businesses Act, 2024 (Bill 195), which proposed changes to Ontario's small business deduction. The bill was defeated on second reading on November 18, 2024, by a vote of 64–35.

=== Re-election and 2026 leadership race ===
Bowman was re-elected in Don Valley West in the 2025 Ontario general election.

Following her re-election, Bowman served as deputy third party House leader and as the Liberal critic for finance and Treasury Board and for interprovincial trade, tariffs and international trade. She also became a commissioner of the Board of Internal Economy.

During the 2026 Ontario Liberal Party leadership election, Bowman supported Rob Cerjanec when he entered the race in May 2026 and served as co-chair of his campaign. After Cerjanec withdrew from the race in July, Bowman began considering a candidacy of her own. She subsequently entered the leadership election before the July 31 candidate-registration deadline. She placed third behind Navdeep Bains and Lee Fairclough.

== Electoral history ==
2025 Ontario general election: Don Valley West
| Party | Candidate | Votes | % | ±% |
|---|---|---|---|---|
| Liberal | Stephanie Bowman | 18,350 | 57.21 | +13.20 |
| Progressive Conservative | Sam Moini | 10,870 | 33.89 | –4.76 |
| New Democratic | Linnea Löfström-Abary | 1,268 | 3.95 | –5.27 |
| Green | Sheena Sharp | 1,052 | 3.28 | –2.23 |
| New Blue | Laurel Hobbs | 287 | 0.89 | –0.25 |
| Independent | Bahira Abdulsalam | 247 | 0.77 | – |
| Total valid votes | | 32,074 | 99.45 | |
| Total rejected, unmarked and declined ballots | | 177 | 0.55 | –0.04 |
| Turnout | | 32,251 | 42.43 | –6.93 |
| Eligible voters | | 76,018 | | |
| Liberal hold | | Swing | | +8.98 |
Source: Elections Ontario

2022 Ontario general election: Don Valley West
| Party | Candidate | Votes | % | ±% | Expenditures |
|---|---|---|---|---|---|
| Liberal | Stephanie Bowman | 16,177 | 44.01 | +5.12 | $70,514 |
| Progressive Conservative | Mark Saunders | 14,208 | 38.65 | +0.16 | $82,792 |
| New Democratic | Irwin Elman | 3,392 | 9.23 | –9.60 | $38,819 |
| Green | Sheena Sharp | 2,025 | 5.51 | +2.74 | $29,106 |
| New Blue | Laurel Hobbs | 421 | 1.15 | – | $4,429 |
| Libertarian | John Kittredge | 225 | 0.61 | –0.22 | $0 |
| Ontario Party | Kylie McAllister | 167 | 0.45 | – | $0 |
| Independent | John Kladitis | 85 | 0.23 | – | $2,390 |
| Consensus Ontario | Paul Reddick | 60 | 0.16 | – | $0 |
| Total valid votes/expense limit | | 36,760 | 99.41 | – | $104,889 |
| Total rejected, unmarked and declined ballots | | 218 | 0.59 | –0.31 | |
| Turnout | | 36,978 | 49.36 | –11.91 | |
| Eligible voters | | 74,921 | | | |
| Liberal hold | | Swing | | ▲2.48 | |
Source: Elections Ontario
