= St. Mary's General Hospital =

Coordinates: 43.437807°N 80.50174°W

WRHN @ Queen's Blvd.
- Waterloo Regional Health Network
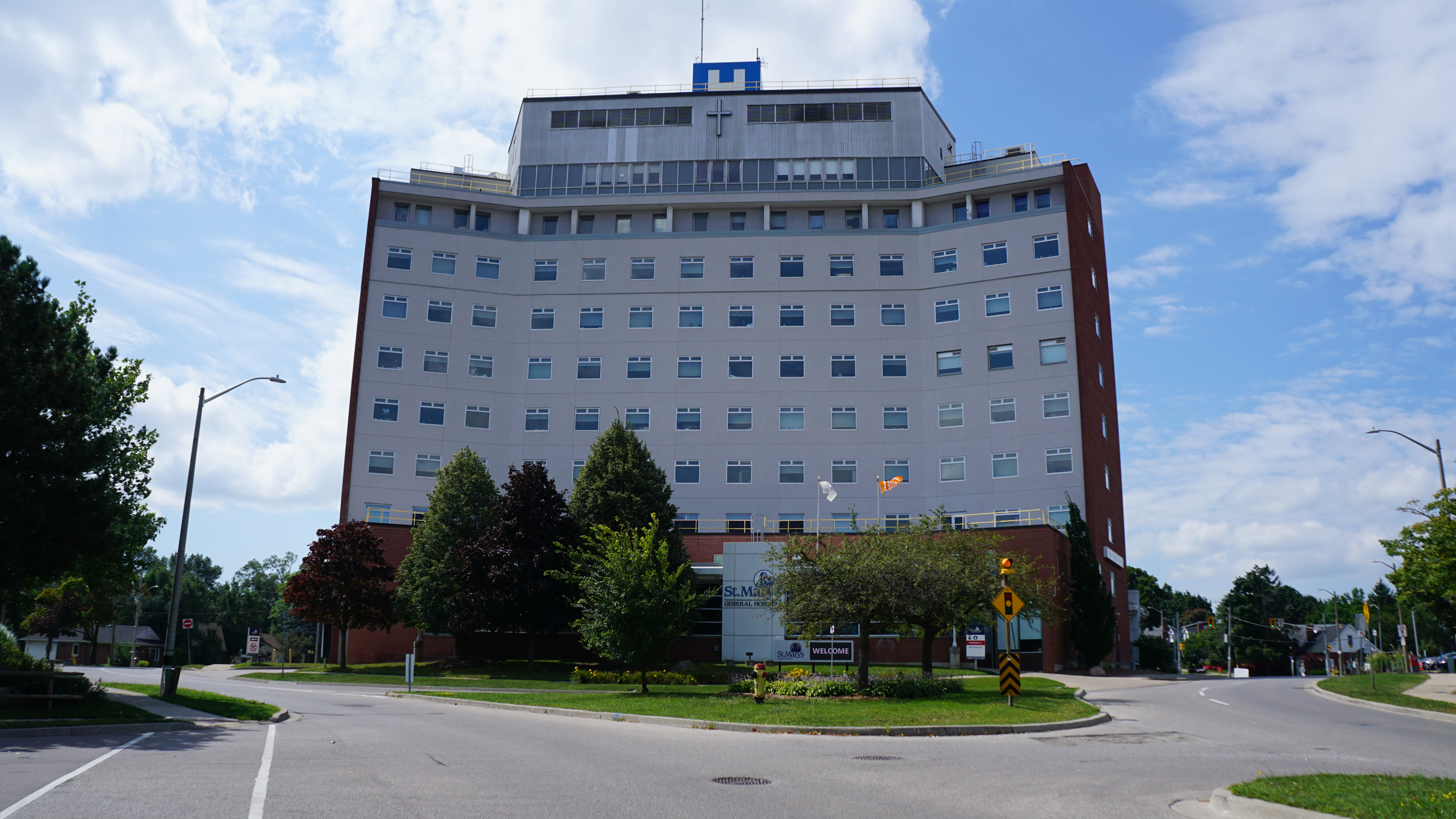

Geography
- Location: 911 Queen's Blvd, Kitchener, Ontario, Canada

Services
- Beds: 197

History
- Former name: St. Mary's Hospital (1924–1959); St. Mary's General Hospital; (1959–2025)
- Founded: 1924

Links
- Lists: Hospitals in Canada

WRHN @ Queen's Blvd., formerly St. Mary's General Hospital, is a 197-bed adult acute-care hospital in Kitchener, Ontario, Canada, serving Waterloo Region and surrounding area. It is the site of the Regional Cardiac Care Centre which opened in 2003, while the emergency department was extensively renovated in 2004. St Mary’s clinical focuses are on cardiac care, respiratory care, outpatient (day) surgery, general medicine, and 24/7 emergency care. Around 2,000 staff, physicians volunteers provide care in these areas of the hospital. Patients who can not be taken care of at St. Mary’s will most likely be transferred to Grand River General Hospital.

St. Mary's General Hospital merged with Grand River Hospital effective 1 April 2025 to form the Waterloo Regional Health Network, and was renamed to WRHN @ Queen's Blvd.

== History ==
=== Early history ===
The Kitchener-Waterloo Hospital served the cities of Kitchener and Waterloo from its opening in 1895. The expansion of the two cities in the years between 1895 and 1916 led Reverend Fischer to believe that a new hospital modelled after the Sisters of Providence of St. Vincent de Paul’s previous work would alleviate pressure on the hospital and serve the growing Catholic population in the cities. The Sisters’ purchased a five-acre site at Queen’s Park Crescent at the southern boundary of the city of Kitchener to serve as the site for the hospital because of its suitability and potential for expansion. The hospital was to be named St. Mary’s Hospital after the St. Mary’s parish. Notably, the hospital was to treat all patients regardless of religion.

St. Mary’s Hospital experienced a period of early tumult before being constructed. Owing to financial and religious difficulties the hospital project was halted in 1917. In 1919, the Sisters of St. Joseph of Hamilton took on the project from the Sisters of Providence. The project began once again, however, in 1920 shortly after, it was halted due to outside forces. The 1920s also saw challenges resulting from the need to build the hospital to conform with new standards of professionalization in medicine and broadly coinciding with a public more receptive to hospitals as institutions of medicine.

Construction of the hospital resumed in 1923. Interest in another hospital in the city among citizens and doctors led to the project's revitalization. At this time the name St. Mary's Hospital was decided upon and fundraising for construction began. The Sisters of St. Joseph of Hamilton committed $350,000 to the construction and opening of the hospital and the Catholic congregations of Kitchener and Waterloo donated $100,000. The last $50,000 was donated by the residents of the two cities. The funds secured would allow for a hospital to be built with a capacity of 100 beds as well as two operating rooms and an entire maternity wing. The cornerstone was laid 21 October 1923 and the official opening of the hospital followed on 21 October 1924. The Hospital was initially a challenge to reach with it being located in an open field and without a proper paved road to the entrance.

Nevertheless, the years 1924 to 1931 saw extensive growth for the Hospital. Available beds in the Hospital increased from 85 to 96 from 1925-1926 and then to 137 by 1928-1929. This period was not without difficulty however, as the Hospital also faced financial challenges resulting from debts and a lack of funding from the municipalities and province. In June 1927 the process of accreditation by the American College of Surgeons began in May 1926 was completed and St. Mary's was declared a class A hospital.

In 1927, the Hospital opened the St. Mary's School of Nursing. Nurses had been present from the inception of the Hospital with fourteen nursing students present in the first year. The nursing school would provide a source of cheap labour in the form of students who received their education in return for their work in the Hospital. Twelve nursing students comprised the first class. 1930 saw the building of a three storey residence to house 46 nurses and the building opened 6 May 1931.

=== Post-War history ===
During the 1930s the Hospital began to experience overcrowding and a lack of space which invited proposals for an expansion. The expansion began to be seriously considered in 1948 following the end of the Second World War when the Hospital experienced admissions increases of thirty percent from the surrounding areas. However, an earlier expansion of the K-W Hospital meant that St. Mary's own proposal to expand the maternity ward by 50 beds and 60 bassinets was postponed. Ultimately, the K-W Hospital's expansion fell short, however, the proposed expansion of St. Mary's was rejected due to budgetary reasons.

In 1952, the chronic overcrowding and lack of space was noted as an issue, particularly in the obstetrics department. In 1953, new federal grants brought funds to ameliorate this issue and the paediatrics department was expanded. 1954 was a busy year for the Hospital, it was granted accreditation by the Joint Commission on Hospital Accreditation and a committee was formed to discuss financing a major expansion. At this time, the X-Ray Department was expanded and upgraded substantially and was promoted as the most advanced in Canada which more than doubled patient capacity. The major expansion of the Hospital was to limit the beds to a 150 bed increase. "Scheme D" was chosen as the preferred option by the Sisters of the Hospital administration which would build a new seven floor vertical structure north of the Hospital connected via tunnel owing to lack of space around the original building. The final plans called for a nine storey building and 150 beds to be built. Such an expansion required sufficient funds which were to be granted from the federal and provincial governments with the Hospital needing to raise funds as well. To this end, General was added to the name in 1959 to combat the perception that the Hospital was only for Roman Catholics. The fundraising campaign began 31 October 1959 intending to raise 1.1 million dollars. The expansion between 1959 and 1962 saw the hospital grow from 123 beds to 354. The expansion of the hospital in 1960 added a new 10-storey tower where most of the existing hospital was replaced with the new expansion. The remaining part of the building now houses the administrative offices. This part of the building used to be the nurses’ residence. The expanded facility included an emergency department and an intensive care unit.

=== Modern history ===
The nursing school was closed, with training moved to Conestoga College. In 1989, activities at St. Mary's were coordinated with those at the Grand River Hospital, and St. Mary's began to specialize in adult care. In 2003, the Regional Cardiac Care Centre (RCCC) at St. Mary's General Hospital was opened. This centre provides care to more than 1.4 million individuals annually. St. Mary’s hospital is considered to be the leader in national safety measures. This brings true to their vision to be the safest and most effective hospital in Canada. They have twice earned a top score in the report and are one of the three centres in Canada performing better than the national average.

A seven-year expansion project was announced in 2020, projected to cost a total of $13 million and that funding would be coming from both the government and donors. The hope with the expansion is that the hospital can perform ablation procedures which study the rhythm of the heart. Patients will no longer have to travel to London, Hamilton, or Toronto to have the procedure performed. On April 1, 2025, Grand River Hospital merged with St. Mary's to form the Waterloo Regional Health Network.

== Hospital leadership ==
In October 2018, Dr. Andrew Falconer was named president of St. Mary's and St. Joseph’s Health System. With a staff of 1,300; this role was to commence in February 2019. Previously, Dr. Falconer was a vice president and chief of staff at Queensway Carleton Hospital in Ottawa after replacing Don Shilton, who had retired in June 2018. In May 2019, however, the hospital announced that Dr. Falconer would returning to Queensway Carleton as President and Chief Executive Officer, requiring a search for a new president of St. Mary's. January 6, 2020, Lee Fairclough became president of St. Mary's General Hospital stepping down in 2022. In February 2023, Mark Fam was appointed to this position by the St. Mary’s board of trustees after a national search for a new president and remains the current president.

== St. Mary's Hospital Foundation ==
The St. Mary’s General Hospital Foundation is a non-profit organization that helps to provide funding for the hospital so it can provide equipment and programs for the patients. Around $5 million in donations from donors is expected to be given to the foundation every year as government funding does not cover all of the costs for replacement and enhancement of equipment. Over the past 10 years, over $50 million has been donated to the hospital through the foundation.
