= Don Valley West (provincial electoral district) =

Provincial electoral district in Ontario, Canada

Coordinates: 43.730°N 79.375°W

Ontario electoral district
- Location in Toronto

Provincial electoral district
- Legislature: Legislative Assembly of Ontario
MPP
Stephanie Bowman
Liberal
- District created: 1996
- First contested: 1999
- Last contested: 2025

Demographics
- Population (2016): 102,510
- Electors (2018): 75,391
- Area (km²): 30
- Pop. density (per km²): 3,417
- Census division: Toronto
- Census subdivision: Toronto

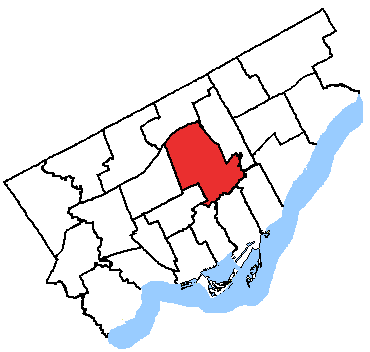
Don Valley West from 2003 to 2018

Don Valley West is a provincial electoral district in Toronto, Ontario, Canada. It elects one member to the Legislative Assembly of Ontario.

It was created in 1999 from parts of Don Mills, York Mills, York East and Eglinton.

The riding was particularly notable in the 2007 election because John Tory, who at the time was leader of the Progressive Conservative Party of Ontario, was defeated by his Liberal opponent Kathleen Wynne. In February 2013, Wynne became Premier of Ontario.

== Boundaries ==
When the riding was created, it included all of Metro Toronto within the following line: Highway 401 to Leslie Street to the CN Railway to Don Mills Road to the CP Railway to the East Branch of the Don River to East York/North York border the Don Valley Parkway to the Don River to Millwood Road to the CP Railway to the East York/North York border to the Old Toronto city limits to Broadway Avenue to Yonge Street.

In 2007 the southern border was altered so that it continues to follow the East Branch of the Don River to the main branch until Pottery Road to Bayview Avenue until the CP railway.

This riding lost significant territory to Don Valley East and gained territory from St. Paul's during the 2012 electoral redistribution.

== Members of Provincial Parliament ==
Don Valley West
Assembly	Years	Member	Party
Riding created from Don Mills, York Mills, York East and Eglinton
37th	1999–2003	David Turnbull	Progressive Conservative
38th	2003–2007	Kathleen Wynne	Liberal
39th	2007–2011	Kathleen Wynne	Liberal
40th	2011–2014	Kathleen Wynne	Liberal
41st	2014–2018	Kathleen Wynne	Liberal
42nd	2018–2022	Kathleen Wynne	Liberal
43rd	2022–2025	Stephanie Bowman	Liberal
44th	2025–present	Stephanie Bowman	Liberal
Sourced from the Ontario Legislative Assembly

== Election results ==
Winning party in each polling division of Don Valley West at the 2025 Ontario general election

2025 Ontario general election
Party	Candidate	Votes	%	±%
Liberal	Stephanie Bowman	18,350	57.21	+13.20
Progressive Conservative	Sam Moini	10,870	33.89	–4.76
New Democratic	Linnea Löfström-Abary	1,268	3.95	–5.27
Green	Sheena Sharp	1,052	3.28	–2.23
New Blue	Laurel Hobbs	287	0.89	–0.25
Independent	Bahira Abdulsalam	247	0.77	–
Total valid votes		32,074	99.45	
Total rejected, unmarked and declined ballots		177	0.55	–0.04
Turnout		32,251	42.43	–6.93
Eligible voters		76,018		
Liberal hold		Swing		+8.98
Source: Elections Ontario

Winning party in each polling division of Don Valley West at the 2022 Ontario general election

2022 Ontario general election
Party	Candidate	Votes	%	±%	Expenditures
Liberal	Stephanie Bowman	16,177	44.01	+5.12	$70,514
Progressive Conservative	Mark Saunders	14,208	38.65	+0.16	$82,792
New Democratic	Irwin Elman	3,392	9.23	–9.60	$38,819
Green	Sheena Sharp	2,025	5.51	+2.74	$29,106
New Blue	Laurel Hobbs	421	1.15	–	$4,429
Libertarian	John Kittredge	225	0.61	–0.22	$0
Ontario Party	Kylie McAllister	167	0.45	–	$0
Independent	John Kladitis	85	0.23	–	$2,390
Consensus Ontario	Paul Reddick	60	0.16	–	$0
Total valid votes/expense limit		36,760	99.41	–	$104,889
Total rejected, unmarked and declined ballots		218	0.59	–0.31	
Turnout		36,978	49.36	–11.91	
Eligible voters		74,921			
Liberal hold		Swing		+2.48	
Source: Elections Ontario

2018 Ontario general election
Party	Candidate	Votes	%	±%
Liberal	Kathleen Wynne	17,802	38.89	–17.41
Progressive Conservative	Jon Kieran	17,621	38.49	+6.24
New Democratic	Amara Possian	8,620	18.83	+11.96
Green	Morgan Bailey	1,268	2.77	–0.42
Libertarian	John Kittredge	380	0.83	–
Canadian Economic Party	Patrick Geoffrey Knight	86	0.19	–
Total valid votes		45,777	99.10	
Total rejected, unmarked and declined ballots		415	0.90	
Turnout		46,192	61.27	
Eligible voters		75,391		
Liberal notional hold		Swing		–11.83
Source: Elections Ontario

2014 general election redistributed results
Party	Vote	%
Liberal	21,830	56.30
Progressive Conservative	12,504	32.25
New Democratic	2,665	6.87
Green	1,237	3.19
Others	536	1.38

2014 Ontario general election
Party	Candidate	Votes	%	±%
Liberal	Kathleen Wynne	26,215	57.01	–1.30
Progressive Conservative	David Porter	14,082	30.63	+0.03
New Democratic	Khalid Ahmed	3,569	7.76	–0.88
Green	Louis Fliss	1,286	2.80	+1.08
Libertarian	Patrick Boyd	338	0.74	–
Communist	Dimitrios Kabitsis	153	0.33	+0.03
Independent	Brock Burrows	138	0.30	–
Vegan Environmental	Rosemary Waigh	116	0.25	–0.01
Freedom	Tracy Curley	83	0.18	+0.00
Total valid votes		45,980	99.09	
Total rejected, unmarked and declined ballots		420	0.91	+0.62
Turnout		46,400	53.90	+2.96
Eligible voters		86,092		
Liberal hold		Swing		–0.66
Source: Elections Ontario

2011 Ontario general election
Party	Candidate	Votes	%	±%
Liberal	Kathleen Wynne	24,444	58.32	+7.88
Progressive Conservative	Andrea Mandel-Campbell	12,827	30.60	–9.08
New Democratic	Khalid Ahmed	3,621	8.64	+3.97
Green	Louis Fliss	718	1.71	–3.10
Communist	Dimitrios Kabitsis	125	0.30	–
Vegan Environmental	Rosemary Waigh	108	0.26	–
Freedom	Soumen Deb	74	0.18	–
Total valid votes		41,917	99.72	
Total rejected, unmarked and declined ballots		118	0.28	–0.37
Turnout		42,035	50.93	–8.27
Eligible voters		82,533		
Liberal hold		Swing		+8.48
Source: Elections Ontario

2007 Ontario general election
Party	Candidate	Votes	%	±%
Liberal	Kathleen Wynne	23,080	50.44	–2.15
Progressive Conservative	John Tory	18,156	39.68	+0.73
Green	Adrian Walker	2,202	4.81	+2.04
New Democratic	Mike Kenny	2,138	4.67	–1.01
Family Coalition	Daniel Kidd	183	0.40	–
Total valid votes		45,759	99.35	
Total rejected, unmarked and declined ballots		300	0.65	+0.07
Turnout		46,059	59.20	–0.65
Eligible voters		77,804		
Liberal hold		Swing		–1.44
Source: Elections Ontario

2003 Ontario general election
Party	Candidate	Votes	%	±%
Liberal	Kathleen Wynne	23,488	52.59	+8.98
Progressive Conservative	David Turnbull	17,394	38.95	–11.58
New Democratic	Ali Naqvi	2,540	5.69	+1.00
Green	Philip Hawkins	1,239	2.77	–
Total valid votes		44,661	99.41	
Total rejected, unmarked and declined ballots		263	0.59	–0.46
Turnout		44,924	59.84	–3.22
Eligible voters		75,068		
Liberal gain from Progressive Conservative		Swing		+10.28
Source: Elections Ontario

1999 Ontario general election
Party	Candidate	Votes	%	±%
Progressive Conservative	David Turnbull	23,177	50.52	–
Liberal	Paul Davidson	20,008	43.62	–
New Democratic	Geoffrey Allen	2,152	4.69	–
Independent	Judith A. Snow	312	0.68	–
Natural Law	Debbie Weberg	224	0.49	–
Total valid votes		45,873	98.95	
Total rejected, unmarked and declined ballots		486	1.05	–
Turnout		46,359	63.06	–
Eligible voters		73,511		
Liberal pickup new district.				
Source: Elections Ontario

== 2007 electoral reform referendum ==
2007 Ontario electoral reform referendum
Side	Votes	%
First Past the Post	28,084	62.9
Mixed member proportional	16,484	37.2
Total valid votes	46,059	100.0
Sourced from Elections Ontario.

== See also ==
- List of Ontario provincial electoral districts
- Canadian provincial electoral districts
