= John Fraser (Ontario MPP) =

Canadian politician

John Fraser MPP
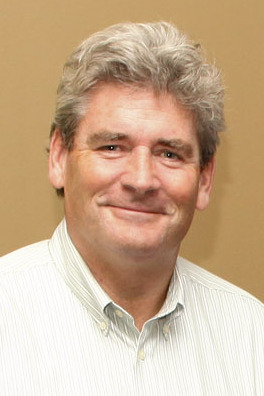
- Fraser in 2013

Leader of the Ontario Liberal Party
- Interim
- In office January 22, 2026 – November 21, 2026
- Preceded by: Bonnie Crombie
- Succeeded by: Navdeep Bains
- In office August 3, 2022 – December 2, 2023
- Deputy: Mitzie Hunter
- Preceded by: Steven Del Duca
- Succeeded by: Bonnie Crombie
- In office June 14, 2018 – March 7, 2020
- Preceded by: Kathleen Wynne
- Succeeded by: Steven Del Duca

Parliamentary Leader of the Ontario Liberal Party
- Incumbent
- Assumed office November 21, 2026
- Leader: Navdeep Bains
- In office December 2, 2023 – January 22, 2026
- Leader: Bonnie Crombie
- In office March 8, 2020 – August 3, 2022
- Leader: Steven Del Duca

Member of the Ontario Provincial Parliament for Ottawa South
- Incumbent
- Assumed office September 9, 2013
- Preceded by: Dalton McGuinty

Personal details
- Born: John P. Fraser; 1959 (age 66–67) Ottawa, Ontario, Canada
- Party: Liberal
- Spouse: Linda Fraser
- Occupation: Politician; business manager

John P. Fraser MPP (born c. 1959) is a Canadian politician who is the parliamentary leader of the Ontario Liberal Party and has led the party in the Legislative Assembly of Ontario since 2018. He also served as the party's interim leader from 2018 to 2020, 2022 to 2023, and from January to November 2026. Fraser is the member of provincial parliament (MPP) for Ottawa South and was first elected in a by-election on August 1, 2013.

Following the resignation of Kathleen Wynne as party leader after the party's poor performance in the 2018 election, he was unanimously endorsed by the other six remaining Liberal MPPs to become interim leader on June 13, 2018 and unanimously elected the next day by a vote of the party executive and riding association presidents.

After Steven Del Duca was elected Liberal leader on March 7, 2020, Fraser remained the party's parliamentary leader as Del Duca did not have a seat in the legislature. He continued in this role during Bonnie Crombie's tenure as leader and again assumed the interim leadership following her resignation in January 2026, lasting until November 2026. He also remained parliamentary leader during Crombie's leadership from 2023 to January 2026 as she did not have a seat in the legislature and continued in that role after Navdeep Bains became leader on November 21, 2026, as he does not have a seat.

== Background ==
Fraser was born in Ottawa and grew up in Elmvale Acres and Alta Vista. According to his biography, "he spearheaded the Our Children, Our Hospital campaign to save the Cardiac Care Unit at CHEO and organized a fundraiser which raised $20,000 for the Heron Road Emergency Food Bank, [and] for a number of years, he served as a palliative care volunteer at the General Campus of the Ottawa Hospital and as a coach to the Canterbury Mustangs Football Team."

Fraser was the parliamentary assistant to the Minister of Health and Long-Term Care. As the parliamentary assistant, Fraser led the development of a comprehensive strategy for palliative and end-of-life care in Ontario, including a $75 million investment. In March 2018, Fraser was part of an announcement to deliver $105 million investment in CHEO to improve mental health and special needs services for children.

As MPP, Fraser led an initiative that would ensure all children have their vision tested before entering senior kindergarten as well as introducing legislation aimed at protecting vulnerable workers and increasing transparency in government. Fraser sponsored several private member's bills including Bill 53, The Protecting Passenger Safety Act 2014 which would stiffen penalties for individuals who transport passengers for compensation without a licence, permit, or authorization. Fraser has worked closely with other Members of Provincial Parliament on legislation including being part of the team that brought forward Rowan's Law, concussion legislation that will protect young athletes; as well as a bill that established "Remembrance Week" in Ontario.

Prior to being elected, Fraser was former Premier Dalton McGuinty's local constituency assistant for 14 years. Fraser spent 18 years managing small- and medium-sized local businesses before entering the public service.

He is married to Linda Fraser and has three children and three grandchildren.

== Politics ==
In 2013, Fraser ran as the Liberal candidate in the riding of Ottawa South in a by-election to replace Dalton McGuinty who had just retired. He defeated Progressive Conservative candidate Matt Young by 1,238 votes. He faced Young again in the 2014 election this time defeating him by 8,610 votes.

In the 2018 Ontario general election, Fraser was re-elected MPP for Ottawa South, receiving 5,464 more votes than the Progressive Conservative Party of Ontario candidate Karin Howard. As a result of her party's poor performance in the election, Premier Kathleen Wynne resigned as leader of the Ontario Liberal Party on election night. On June 13, the Liberal caucus unanimously endorsed Fraser to serve as the party's interim leader On June 14, he was appointed interim leader following a vote by caucus members, the party executive, and riding association presidents.

He was re-elected in the 2022 Ontario general election and again became interim leader of the Ontario Liberal Party effective August 3, 2022. Upon the election of Bonnie Crombie as party leader in December 2023 he remained Parliamentary Leader as Crombie had yet to run for a seat in the legislature. As of July 7, 2024, he also serves as the Liberal Party critic for Children, Social and Community Services as well as the critic for Seniors and Long-term Care. He was re-elected in the 2025 Ontario general election and became interim leader after Crombie's resignation in 2026.

== Electoral record ==
2025 Ontario general election: Ottawa South
Party	Candidate	Votes	%	±%	Expenditures
Liberal	John Fraser	22,326	53.24	+8.10	$81,211
Progressive Conservative	Jan Gao	10,315	24.60	+1.41	$53,126
New Democratic	Morgan Gay	7,447	17.76	–5.99	$37,294
Green	Nira Dookeran	1,206	2.88	–1.78	$5,883
New Blue	Alex Perrier	638	1.52	–0.15	$440
Total valid votes/expense limit		41,932	99.38	–	$192,174
Total rejected, unmarked and declined ballots		260	0.62	–0.07	
Turnout		42,192	42.49	+0.01	
Eligible voters		99,305			
Liberal hold		Swing		+3.34	
Source: Elections Ontario

2022 Ontario general election: Ottawa South
Party	Candidate	Votes	%	±%	Expenditures
Liberal	John Fraser	18,282	45.14	+5.51	$62,564
New Democratic	Morgan Gay	9,619	23.75	–3.44	$41,459
Progressive Conservative	Edward Dinca	9,390	23.19	–6.04	$18,192
Green	Nira Dookeran	1,885	4.65	+1.57	$381
New Blue	Martin Ince	675	1.67	–	$0
Ontario Party	Myles Dear	386	0.95	–	$0
Independent	Daniel Thomas	154	0.38	–	$0
Communist	Larry Wasslen	109	0.27	+0.05	$0
Total valid votes/expense limit		40,500	99.32	–	$134,387
Total rejected, unmarked and declined ballots		279	0.68	–0.47	
Turnout		40,779	42.48	–14.43	
Eligible voters		95,991			
Liberal hold		Swing		+4.47	
Source: Elections Ontario

2018 Ontario general election: Ottawa South
Party	Candidate	Votes	%	±%
Liberal	John Fraser	20,773	39.63	–10.33
Progressive Conservative	Karin Howard	15,319	29.23	–2.88
New Democratic	Eleanor Fast	14,250	27.19	+14.93
Green	Les Schram	1,618	3.09	–1.20
Libertarian	Robert Daigneault	342	0.65	+0.08
Communist	Larry Wasslen	114	0.22	–0.08
Total valid votes		52,416	98.85	
Total rejected, unmarked and declined ballots		611	1.15	+0.25
Turnout		53,027	56.92	+3.21
Eligible voters		93,167		
Liberal hold		Swing		–3.73
Source: Elections Ontario

2014 Ontario general election: Ottawa South
Party	Candidate	Votes	%	±%
Liberal	John Fraser	23,727	50.03	+7.70
Progressive Conservative	Matt Young	15,110	31.86	−6.84
New Democratic	Bronwyn Funiciello	5,867	12.37	−1.93
Green	Matt Lakatos-Hayward	2,064	4.35	+1.23
Libertarian	Jean-Serge Brisson	273	0.58	−0.01
Special Needs	John Redins	244	0.51	+0.22
Communist	Espoir Manirambona	141	0.30	
Total valid votes		47,426	100.0	
Liberal hold		Swing		+7.27
Source(s) "General Election Results by District, 064 Ottawa South". Elections Ontario. 2014. Archived from the original on 23 September 2014.

Ontario provincial by-election, August 1, 2013: Ottawa South Resignation of Dalton McGuinty
Party	Candidate	Votes	%	±%	Expenditures
Liberal	John Fraser	14,921	42.33	−6.53	$ 95,351.00
Progressive Conservative	Matt Young	13,642	38.70	+5.27	89,316.00
New Democratic	Bronwyn Funiciello	5,042	14.30	+0.91	40,274.11
Green	Taylor Howarth	1,099	3.12	−0.11	2,212.50
Libertarian	Jean-Serge Brisson	208	0.59	+0.03	0.00
Special Needs	John Redins	102	0.29	−0.24	0.00
Independent	Daniel Post	91	0.26		0.00
Freedom	Dave McGruer	85	0.24		0.00
Pauper	John Turmel	58	0.16		0.00
Total valid votes / Expense limit		35,248	100.00	−21.16	$ 104,501.00
Total rejected, unmarked and declined ballots		216	0.61	+0.12	
Turnout		35,464	40.38	−10.81	
Eligible voters		87,816		+0.06	
Liberal hold		Swing		−5.90	
Source(s) "Summary of Valid Votes Cast for Each Candidate - August 1, 2013 By-Elections" (PDF). Archived from the original (PDF) on 23 September 2015. "Statistical Summary – 2013 By-Election" ( Excel Spreadsheet (23KB)). Elections Ontario. Archived from the original on 11 June 2014. "2013 Ottawa South By-Election – Candidate Campaign Returns (CR-1)". Archived from the original on 10 April 2015.
