= Kathleen Wynne =

Premier of Ontario from 2013 to 2018

The Honourable Kathleen Wynne ECO
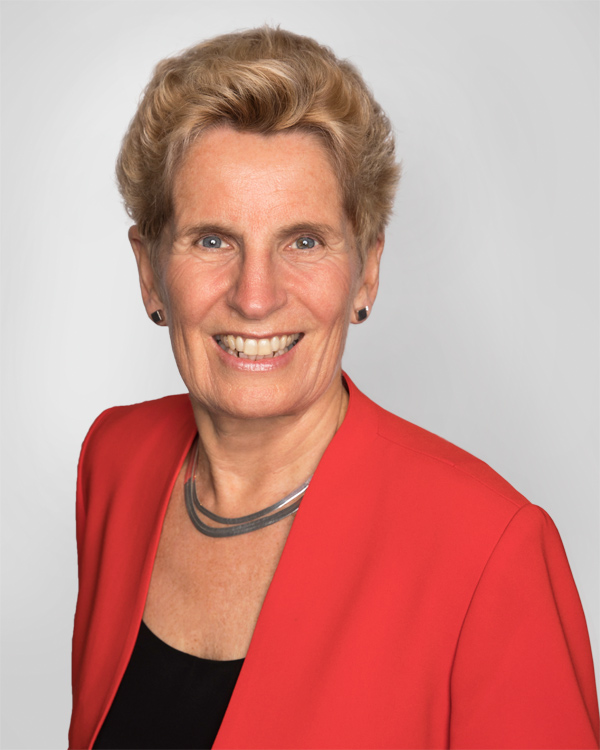
- Wynne in 2017

25th Premier of Ontario
- In office February 11, 2013 – June 29, 2018
- Monarch: Elizabeth II
- Lieutenant Governor: David Onley; Elizabeth Dowdeswell
- Preceded by: Dalton McGuinty
- Succeeded by: Doug Ford

Member of the Ontario Provincial Parliament for Don Valley West
- In office October 2, 2003 – May 3, 2022
- Preceded by: David Turnbull
- Succeeded by: Stephanie Bowman
Additional offices held
Leader of the Ontario Liberal Party
In office January 26, 2013 – June 7, 2018
Preceded by	Dalton McGuinty
Succeeded by	John Fraser (interim)
Minister of Intergovernmental Affairs
In office February 11, 2013 – June 29, 2018
Premier	Herself
Preceded by	Laurel Broten
Succeeded by	Doug Ford
Minister of Agriculture and Food
In office February 11, 2013 – June 24, 2014
Premier	Herself
Preceded by	Ted McMeekin
Succeeded by	Jeff Leal
Minister of Municipal Affairs and Housing Minister of Aboriginal Affairs
In office October 20, 2011 – November 5, 2012
Premier	Dalton McGuinty
Preceded by	Sandra Pupatello (Municipal Affairs and Housing); Chris Bentley (Aboriginal Affairs)
Succeeded by	Bob Chiarelli (Municipal Affairs and Housing); Chris Bentley (Aboriginal Affairs)
Minister of Transportation
In office January 18, 2010 – October 20, 2011
Premier	Dalton McGuinty
Preceded by	Rick Bartolucci
Succeeded by	Bob Chiarelli (interim)
Minister of Education
In office September 18, 2006 – January 18, 2010
Premier	Dalton McGuinty
Preceded by	Sandra Pupatello
Succeeded by	Leona Dombrowsky
Toronto District School Board Trustee for Ward 8
In office 2000–2003

Personal details
- Born: Kathleen O'Day Wynne; May 21, 1953 (age 73) Richmond Hill, Ontario, Canada
- Party: Ontario Liberal
- Spouses: Phil Cowperthwaite (m. 1977; div. 1991) Jane Rounthwaite (m. 2005)
- Children: 3
- Education: Queen's University; University of Toronto
- Occupation: Politician
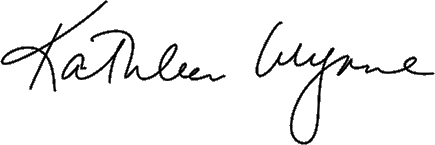
- Signature

Kathleen O'Day Wynne (Note: /wɪn/) (born May 21, 1953) is a Canadian politician who served as the 25th premier of Ontario and leader of the Ontario Liberal Party from 2013 to 2018. Wynne served in the Legislative Assembly of Ontario from 2003 to 2022, as the member of Provincial Parliament (MPP) for Don Valley West. She is the first woman to serve as the premier of Ontario and the first openly gay premier in Canada.

Wynne was first elected to public office as a trustee for the Toronto District School Board (TDSB) in 2000. She subsequently was elected to the Ontario Legislature in 2003. Under Premier Dalton McGuinty, she served in various cabinet posts, until resigning to run in the Liberal leadership race when McGuinty announced his resignation in 2012. Wynne replaced McGuinty as premier and leader of the Liberal Party upon her victory of the leadership, and subsequently led the party to a majority government victory in the 2014 Ontario provincial election.

As premier, Wynne introduced free prescription drug coverage for children, increased the minimum wage to $14 an hour, and introduced free post-secondary tuition for families making under $50,000. Controversially, her government introduced a reformed sex education curriculum, brought in a cap-and-trade pollution pricing regime with Quebec and California, and partially privatized Hydro One.

Wynne sought another mandate in the 2018 provincial election; however, she conceded midway into the election and acknowledged her party would not form government again. The Liberals would lose official party status in the worst defeat of a governing party in Ontario history. Wynne subsequently resigned as Liberal leader on election night and was succeeded by Ottawa South MPP John Fraser as interim party leader. Wynne formally resigned as premier on June 29, 2018. She held her seat in the Legislative Assembly and continued to sit as an MPP until 2022 when she did not contest the provincial election and retired from politics.

== Background ==
Kathleen O'Day Wynne was born on May 21, 1953, in Richmond Hill, to Dr. John B. Wynne and Patsy O'Day. Her mother was a musician who grew up in Nassau in the Bahamas before immigrating to Canada.

Wynne grew up in Richmond Hill, Ontario. She earned a Bachelor of Arts degree at Queen's University and a Master of Arts degree in linguistics from the University of Toronto. She achieved a Master of Education degree in adult education from the Ontario Institute for Studies in Education (University of Toronto). She was a member of the discipline committee of the Ontario Society of Psychotherapists from 1997 to 2000.

Wynne served as president of the Toronto Institute of Human Relations. In 1996, she helped found Citizens for Local Democracy, which opposed the amalgamation of Metropolitan Toronto undertaken by the Progressive Conservative (PC) government of Premier Mike Harris. She founded the Metro Parent Network (later renamed the Toronto Parent Network) which supports improvements in the province's public education system and has participated in numerous other community endeavours.

Prior to her coming out as a lesbian at age 37 she was married to Phil Cowperthwaite, with whom she had three children. She now lives with her second spouse, Jane Rounthwaite, whom Wynne has stated is to be referred to as her "partner" (rather than "wife"). They were married in July 2005 at Fairlawn Avenue United Church in Toronto. Wynne is a member of the United Church of Canada.

== School trustee ==
Wynne first ran for trustee in 1994 in Ward 12 but was defeated by Ann Vanstone. In 2000, she ran again and was elected as a trustee for the Toronto District School Board in ward 8. During the campaign, she was labelled an "extremist lesbian" in literature distributed by the "Concerned Citizens of North York and North Toronto". This was the ratepayer group that later supported Karen Stintz in her campaign against local councillor Anne Johnston. Wynne strongly opposed cuts to public education mandated by the Progressive Conservative government.

In 2001, Wynne helped pass a measure encouraging public schools to purchase teaching materials reflecting the presence of gay and lesbian parents in modern society. In December 2001, she ran for chair of the school board but was defeated by Donna Cansfield in a 12–10 vote.

== Early provincial politics ==
Wynne was a co-founder with John Sewell of Citizens for Local Democracy, a grassroots group that opposed the 1999 amalgamation of the old City of Toronto with the rest of Metropolitan Toronto. She attempted to enter provincial politics on the strength of her grassroots work and sought the Liberal nomination in St. Paul's for the 1999 provincial election but was defeated for the party nomination by Michael Bryant by a margin of 328 votes to 143. She was elected to the school board the following year, and in 2003, became the Liberal nominee in Don Valley West. In the 2003 provincial election, she defeated Progressive Conservative cabinet minister David Turnbull by over 5,000 votes and became MPP for her riding. The Liberals won the election, and Wynne was appointed parliamentary assistant to Minister of Training, Colleges and Universities Mary Anne Chambers, in October 2003. In October 2004, she was appointed parliamentary assistant to Minister of Education Gerard Kennedy.

From June 2005 to November 2005 she served as a member of the Select Committee on Electoral Reform, which recommended "that the referendum be binding upon a vote of 50% + 1, and the support of 50% + 1 in at least two-thirds (i.e., 71) of the ridings or any other formula that ensures the result has support from Northern, rural, and urban areas of the Province", although the cabinet subsequently decided on 100.

On September 18, 2006, she was promoted to minister of education in a cabinet shuffle occasioned by the resignation of Joe Cordiano from the Legislature. She was the province's first openly lesbian cabinet minister and only the second openly LGBT cabinet minister after Deputy Premier George Smitherman. On January 18, 2010, she was moved to minister of transportation and in 2011 she was appointed minister of municipal affairs and housing and minister of aboriginal affairs.

In the 2007 provincial election, Wynne was challenged by the PC leader John Tory. Tory, who was elected to Dufferin—Peel—Wellington—Grey (former PC leader Ernie Eves' riding) in a by-election, was seeking a seat in a Toronto-area riding. Though it was projected to be a close race, Wynne was re-elected with 50.4 percent of the popular vote, defeating Tory, who came in second with 39.7 percent of the popular vote.

=== McGuinty cabinet ===
McGuinty ministry, Province of Ontario (2003–2013)
Cabinet posts (4)
Predecessor	Office	Successor
Chris Bentley	Minister of Aboriginal Affairs; 2011–2012	Chris Bentley
Rick Bartolucci	Minister of Municipal Affairs and Housing; 2011–2012	Bob Chiarelli
Jim Bradley	Minister of Transportation; 2010–2011	Bob Chiarelli
Sandra Pupatello	Minister of Education; 2006–2010	Leona Dombrowsky

== 2013 leadership race ==
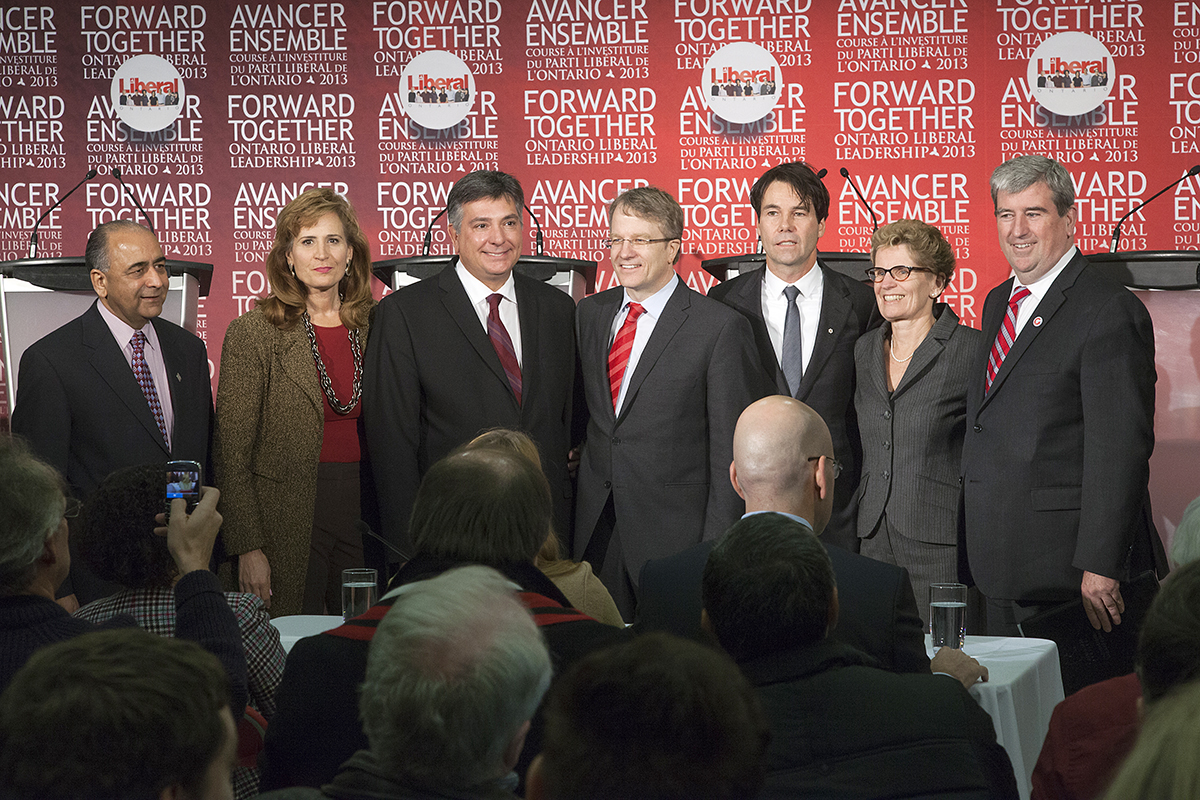
Ontario Liberal leadership candidates. Harinder Takhar, Sandra Pupatello, Charles Sousa, Gerard Kennedy, Eric Hoskins, Kathleen Wynne, and Glen Murray

Premier Dalton McGuinty announced on October 15, 2012, that he would resign as leader of the Ontario Liberal Party and premier of the province once his successor was chosen.

On November 2, 2012, Wynne resigned her cabinet post and three days later launched her bid for the leadership of the party. Wynne was seen as having the strongest on-the-ground organization among the seven candidates, and along with former MPP Sandra Pupatello, and was one of the front runners. She had the most supporters running to be delegates at the convention, with 1,533, and was the only candidate to have supporters in place in all 107 of the province's ridings. Days before members were to begin electing delegates Glen Murray announced he was exiting the leadership race and endorsed Wynne's candidacy. Despite running with the most supporters for delegate positions Wynne placed second, with 468 delegates, behind Pupatello who had 509 delegates. Pupatello was also believed to have the most support among ex officio delegates, which are MPPs, MPs (members of parliament), defeated candidates and other Liberal insiders, and was expected to increase her lead over Wynne on the first ballot at the convention.

At the convention on January 26, 2013, she used her speech to discuss repairing relations with teachers and working with opposition parties, and took aim at her main rival Pupatello, who did not hold a seat, by saying that she was ready to govern and would recall the legislature on February 19. Wynne also addressed her sexuality saying; "When I ran in 2003, I was told that the people of North Toronto and Thorncliffe Park were not ready to elect a gay woman. Well, apparently they were." She went on to say "I don't believe the people of Ontario judge their leaders on the basis of race, colour or sexual orientation – I don't believe they hold that prejudice in their hearts."

When the first ballot results were announced Wynne received 597 votes, trailing Pupatello by only two votes. Eric Hoskins received the fewest votes of the six candidates and was therefore eliminated. Hoskins threw his support behind Wynne while fourth-place candidate Harinder Takhar announced he was endorsing Pupatello. On the second ballot, Pupatello's lead grew to 67 votes over Wynne. Takhar, whose name was left on the second ballot, finished last and was eliminated from the race. Gerard Kennedy and Charles Sousa, who finished third and fourth respectively, withdrew from the race and both endorsed Wynne. With the support of both Kennedy and Sousa, her win was all but guaranteed on the third ballot. When the results of that ballot were announced Wynne received 57 per cent of the votes compared to 43 per cent for Pupatello.

== Premiership (2013–2018) ==
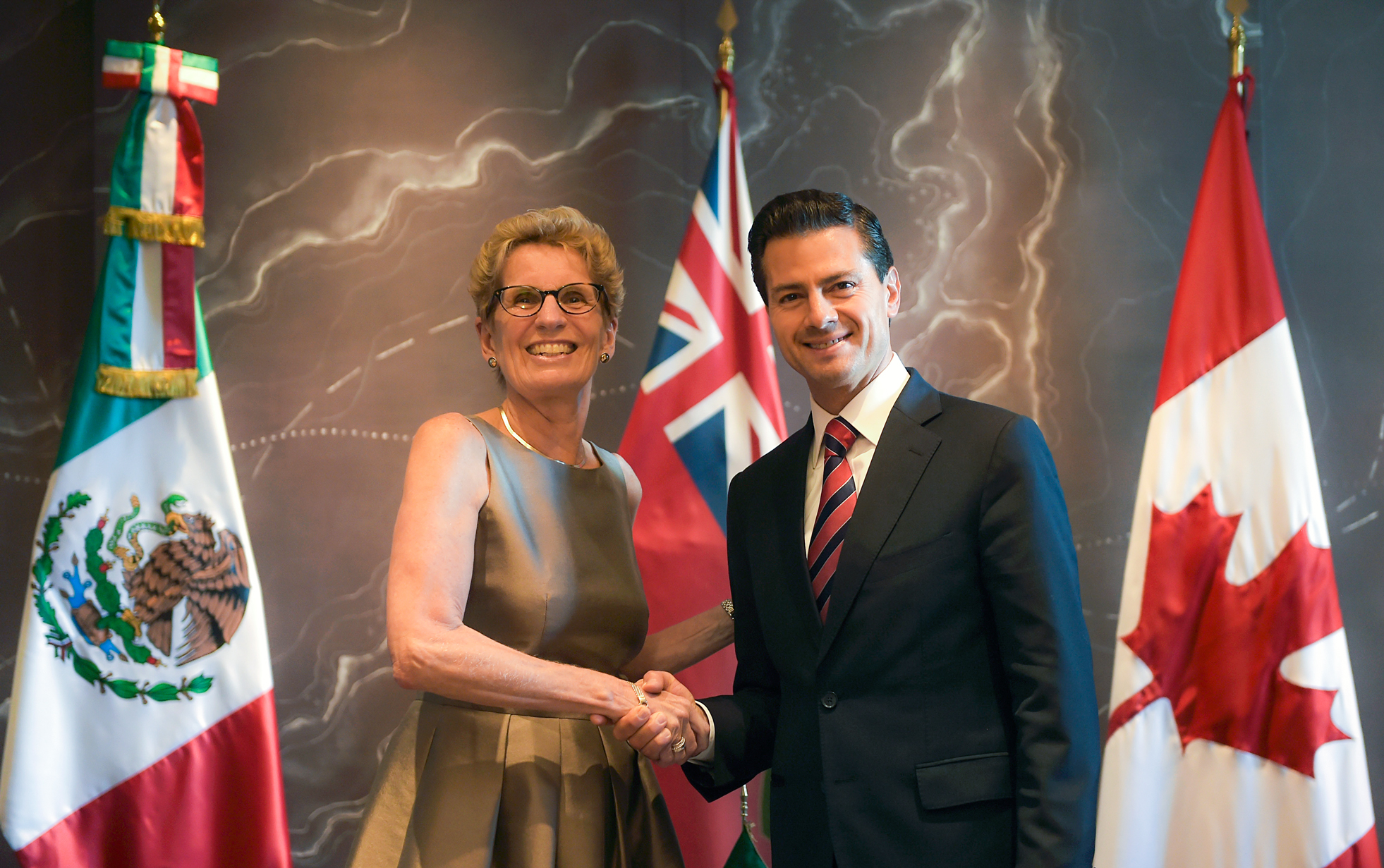
Wynne with Enrique Peña Nieto in 2016

Wynne was sworn in as premier of Ontario on February 11, 2013, becoming the province's first female premier, and the first premier in Canada to be openly gay. After four months of prorogation of the legislature, Wynne resumed the house on February 17, 2013.

=== Gas plant scandal ===
After being sworn in as premier, Wynne quickly became embroiled in the Ontario power plant scandal, which had developed under the administration of her predecessor, Premier Dalton McGuinty. Opposition parties accused Wynne of having a role in the McGuinty government's costly decision to cancel the construction of gas plants in Mississauga and North-East Oakville in 2011, when she was co-chair of the Liberal campaign. Wynne denied that she was involved in the gas plant meetings or in the decision to cancel the plants, and asked the auditor general to investigate the cost of cancelling the plants. After months of investigation, the auditor general released their report on the gas plants in October 2013, suggesting the cancellation of both gas plants could cost taxpayers as much as $1.1 billion. After the report was released by the auditor general, Wynne admitted the gas plant relocations "shouldn't have happened". She apologized, vowing to ensure that "this doesn't happen again".

In February 2013, the legislative committee that had been investigating the gas plants cancellation prior to McGuinty's resignation and prorogation of the legislature in October resumed its work. Wynne called for the release of all documents related to the decision to the legislature's Justice Committee and agreed to testify before the committee, while continuing to deny that she was involved in the decision to cancel the plants. Appearing before the committee in April 2013, Wynne testified she had had no role in the decision to cancel the plants, and had learned of the decision to cancel the plants through media reports.

In June 2013, opposition parties called on the Ontario Provincial Police (OPP) to open an investigation into new allegations that staffers in Premier McGuinty's office had deleted emails regarding the gas plants. On June 7, the OPP launched a criminal investigation into the deletion of the emails, after the Privacy Commissioner ruled that the gas plant emails were illegally deleted. In April 2014, OPP investigators stated that there was no evidence that the premier had been involved in the deletion of emails related to the gas plants, and that the Premier was not the subject of their investigation, which was instead focused on staffers and bureaucrats who had worked in Premier McGuinty's office.

On March 24, 2014, Wynne introduced a piece of legislation called the Public Sector and MPP Accountability and Transparency Act, which implemented a wide range of new measures designed to increase government accountability and transparency. Among other things, the act required all MPPs, cabinet ministers, parliamentary assistants, opposition leaders, and their respective staff to post their expense reports online, expanded the powers of the integrity commissioner and ombudsman, and introduced a fine of $5,000 for the willful destruction of government records. While Wynne declined to characterize the act as a rebuke to McGuinty and those who had been involved in the deletion of gas plant-related emails, the act was widely seen as a response to the gas plants controversy and other controversies over government officials' and public sector employees' expenses.

In April 2014, Wynne launched a libel lawsuit against PC MPP Lisa MacLeod and Party Leader Hudak after they said that she "oversaw and possibly ordered the criminal destruction of [gas plant] documents". In July 2015, Wynne, MacLeod and Hudak reached an agreement whereby the lawsuit was dropped. They said in a joint statement, "Politics is not for the thin-skinned. However, our system also requires that politicians act honestly and based on fact, while respecting the views of others ... In the lead-up to the last election the debate went beyond differences over our approach and at times became personal. The lawsuit between us, and the comments that led to it, did not reflect our view that the other is in fact a great mother/father, an honourable person and a dedicated public servant." The statement avoided any apology or placement of blame.

=== Hydro One ===
In 2016, Kathleen Wynne decided to sell 30 per cent of Hydro One, an electric utility Crown corporation, to private owners. The owners are free to increase prices and sell up to 60 per cent of the government's total shares. Wynne used approximately four billion dollars of the nine billion dollars which the shares were sold for to pay off government debt before the next election, and the other five billion dollars to the Trillium Trust to improve transit lines and to build infrastructure. Wynne faced major backlash for the privatization of Hydro One. Approximately 67 per cent of Ontario citizens did not agree with the privatization, and her approval rating dropped to 14 per cent, the lowest of any premier in Ontario's history.

=== 2013 budget ===
On March 21, 2013, Wynne introduced her government's first budget with measures that included a $295 million investment into a youth jobs strategy to help tackle the high youth unemployment rate, reducing auto insurance rates by 15 per cent to save motorists $225 a year, $260 million investment to boost home care health services for 46,000 seniors, $45 million investment into an Ontario Music Fund to help Ontario musicians, a $200 per month earnings exemption for those on Ontario Works and Ontario Disability Support Program, $5 million into First Nations education, elimination of the employers health tax exemption for large companies, postponed tax cuts for big businesses, extended the capital cost allowance for machinery and equipment, increased the Ontario Child Benefit from $1,100 to $1,310 per year to support low-income families and other economic measures.

Critics called the budget a lavish expenditure in order to gain support from the New Democratic Party (NDP) for the budget. PC leader Tim Hudak had earlier said that he would not support the budget regardless of its contents. He said, "the sooner there's a change in government, the better it is to give hope to people in the province who have lost hope." On June 11, 2013, the budget passed by a vote of 64–36 with NDP support and all 36 PC members voting against it.

=== Education ===
Kathleen Wynne's involvement with the administration of grade school and post-secondary education was largely marked by labour disruptions and teacher strikes. Wynne immediately started new collective bargaining negotiations with the Elementary Teachers Federation of Ontario (ETFO) after a year of labour distress that had culminated in the Putting Students First Act, 2012, which had suspended collective bargaining rights, imposed contracts on teachers and suspended the right to strike.

On April 8, 2014, the Wynne government reached a new bargaining agreement with the teachers unions and passed the School Boards Collective Bargaining Act, 2014, which restored their bargaining rights, the right to strike, kept the wage freeze on teachers, eliminated the retirement gratuity for teachers, and assigned her provincial government control over funding for schools and programs. The legislation also gave the minister of education the power to audit school boards if disclosure of spending was not provided. Wynne established the Premier's Youth Advisory Council to advise the premier on issues facing youth.

In February 2015, her government introduced changes to the sex education curriculum, which has not been updated since 1998, in public schools. However, these changes were met with controversy and criticism not only by the opposition parties but among parents and conservatives; in one instance, some schools were empty as some parents pulled their children out in protest of these changes. In her final year as premier, Wynne also introduced back to work legislation for two different strikes by post-secondary educators, where the unions complained of precarious working conditions and predatory wages, in some cases caused by chronic under-funding from the provincial government. Her legislation to force an end to the strikes succeeded in the first case but failed in the second.

=== Economy ===
On January 30, 2014, Wynne announced her government increased the minimum wage from $10.25 to $11 after a four-year freeze on the rate and introduced legislation to ensure future increases to the minimum wage to keep up with the CPI (Consumer Price Index). Wynne also announced a partnership with Cisco Canada that would create 1,700 new jobs. Prior to these announcements, Wynne had announced tax relief for small businesses by increasing the employers' health-tax exemption from $400,000 to $450,000.

Between late October and early November 2014, Wynne went on a trade mission to China along with other provincial premiers. The trade mission attracted approximately a billion dollars' worth of investment and 1,800 new jobs to Ontario.

After Honda announced plans to invest $857 million in three plants, Wynne also announced that her government would invest 10 per cent of the total invested by Honda.

By the end of 2015, the unemployment rate in Ontario had become lower than the national average. The Conference Board of Canada also found that Ontario's economy had the second strongest growth rate of all provinces in 2015 behind British Columbia (BC), and was projected to be in the top 3 for 2016 among BC and Manitoba.

=== 2014 election ===
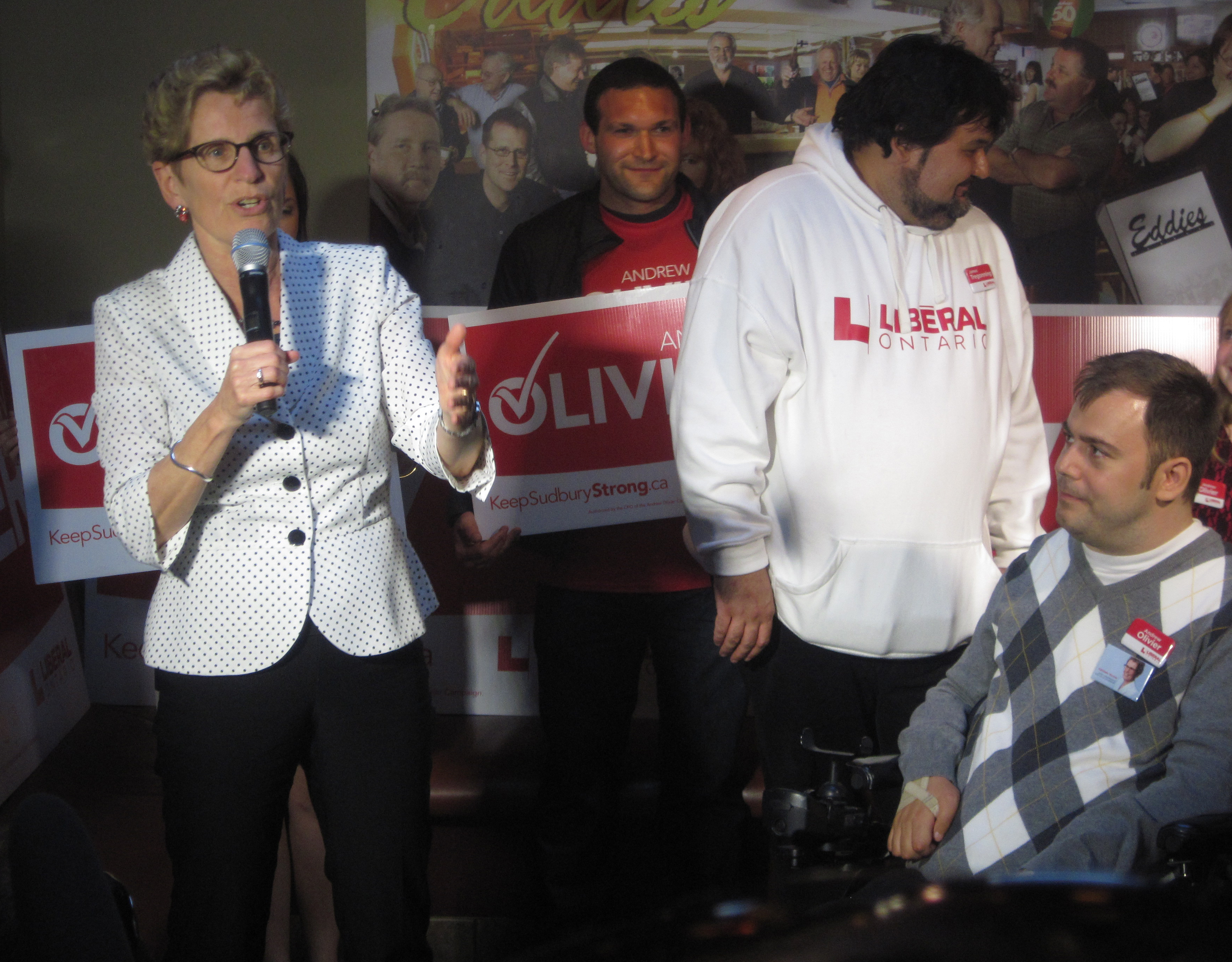
Wynne campaigning in Sudbury, May 2014

Throughout the spring of 2014, there was widespread speculation that a general election would be triggered upon the presentation of the 2014–15 provincial budget, due to recent gains in by-elections by the NDP, whose support was required for the Liberal government's budget to pass. On May 1, 2014, the Wynne government handed down its budget, which was described as "NDP-friendly" by many pundits. One Queen's Park columnist called the budget, "the most progressive one this province has seen since [former NDP leader] Bob Rae was Premier." In it, the Liberals projected a $12.5 billion deficit for the 2014-15 fiscal year, with an attempt to eliminate the deficit by 2017–18. The budget included wage increases for home care and child care workers, a $29 billion transportation plan to fund roads, bridges, and transit around the province, an Ontario Registered Pension Plan, which would act as a supplement to the Canada Pension Plan, higher taxes on high-income earners, and increased fees for cigarettes and airplane fuel, among others.

The budget was contingent on NDP support, as the PCs had already indicated that they would vote against it. While NDP leader, Andrea Horwath, had, during the last two budget negotiations in 2012 and 2013, spent some time reviewing the budget and talking to her supporters before revealing how her party would vote, this time she almost immediately announced the NDP would not support the budget, thus sending the province into a general election. The day after the budget was read, Wynne went to the lieutenant governor to dissolve the Legislature and trigger an election, rather than wait for her budget to be voted down on the floor of the Legislature. The election was called for June 12, 2014, extending the campaign to five weeks (rather than the minimum of 29 days) to avoid a conflict with a Jewish holiday.

While pundits had predicted the Ontario election to be a wild card three-way race between the Liberals, PCs and NDP, the first two weeks of the campaign saw the polls stabilize into a narrow two-party race between Wynne's Liberals and Tim Hudak's PCs, with the NDP falling into a distant third. The first public poll of the campaign, conducted by Forum Research, showed the PCs ahead in the popular vote, but the Liberals likely on track to retain a minority government.

Wynne ran a fairly controversy-free campaign, although her performance in the televised leaders' debate on June 3 was criticized by pundits as being weak and she was on the defensive for many of the scandals that had plagued her predecessor, Dalton McGuinty. The NDP's slow start and public internal rift over the party's decision to reject Wynne's budget coupled with the unpopularity of Hudak's 100,000 job cut pledge helped Wynne throughout the campaign. She began to eat away at the NDP's traditional left-wing support, especially in and around Toronto, and the controversies over some of Hudak's economic policies hurt him among centrist voters across the province. Furthermore, Wynne ran hard near the end of the campaign on the premise that in a close election, the Liberals were the only party who were in a position to defeat the PCs. The Liberals ran ads in the final weeks of the campaign warning voters that a vote for the NDP would be a vote for the PCs as it would further divide the anti-Hudak vote (who was quite unpopular among a broad swath of Ontario voters). This tactic was similar to what the federal Liberals were successful at doing during the 2004 federal election, where the party pushed hard for strategic voting to stop the federal Conservatives, led by Stephen Harper. In fact, many of the top campaign operatives during Wynne's election worked on the 2004 federal Liberal campaign.

Wynne's Liberals were only endorsed by one major newspaper, the Toronto Star, while most other news organizations endorsed the Hudak PCs. There was a controversy that emerged regarding The Globe and Mail's election endorsement. According to an online leak, a majority of the members of the editorial board were prepared to endorse the Liberals, but were overruled by upper management. There was also controversy surrounding a cartoon in the Sun newspapers during the final week of the campaign that showed a pair of broken glasses, presumably Wynne's, smashed on the ground with a smattering of blood. The cartoon received near universal condemnation for projecting the image that abusing women was somehow accepted in society. Nevertheless, in the final week of the campaign, Wynne led most public opinion polls, some of which projected a majority Liberal government on June 12, though the final polls of the campaign predicted different results. One pollster, Ipsos Reid, still projected on the final day of the campaign that the PCs were ahead among likely voters, and that the NDP and Liberals were tied at around 30 per cent.

Ontario popular vote (2014 v. 2011)
Party	Year	Votes	Change
Liberal	2011	37.65%	+1.00%
Liberal	2014	38.65%	+1.00%
Conservative	2011	35.45%	-4.20%
Conservative	2014	31.25%	-4.20%
NDP	2011	22.74%	+1.01%
NDP	2014	23.75%	+1.01%
Others	2011	4.16%	+2.19%
Others	2014	6.35%	+2.19%

Elections to the Legislative Assembly of Ontario - seats won/lost by party, 2011–2014
Party	2011	Gain from (loss to)					2014
Party	2011	Lib		PC	NDP		2014
Liberal	53			7	3	(5)	58
Progressive Conservative	37		(7)			(2)	28
New Democratic	17	5	(3)	2			21
Total	107	5	(10)	9	3	(7)	107

On election day, Wynne's Liberals led province-wide all night as they captured a fourth term in office, and moved from minority to majority government. However, the election results proved to be mixed:

- The Liberals only lost 2 seats that they had held at dissolution, Teresa Piruzza in Windsor West and the open seat in Sudbury, but captured 10 seats from the PCs and NDP, all of them in and around the Golden Horseshoe.
- They managed to capitalize on the NDP's drift away from their left flank under Horwath's leadership by winning long-held NDP seats in Toronto, but the NDP managed to hold on to the seats they had previously gained in by-elections, while also taking two seats from the PCs. The Liberals also won 7 PC seats in the GTHA, including ridings like Durham, Cambridge and Burlington that had been held by the PCs for decades.
- Voter turnout also increased to 52.1 per cent—the first increase in decades—but it was the failure of the PCs to increase their vote count (while all other major parties saw theirs increase) that proved to be the key factor in the outcome.
- The party was quite successful at turning out Liberal voters in competitive ridings, especially in the GTA, Ottawa, and Midwestern Ontario. Wynne herself was re-elected handily in her North Toronto riding of Don Valley West.

It was observed after the election, that her sexual orientation was treated as a complete non-issue during the campaign with Wynne subject to no significant comment because of that personal detail. On July 2, Wynne re-convened the Ontario Legislature to pass the budget that had been introduced, but not voted on, prior to the writs being dropped for the election.

=== 2015 budget ===
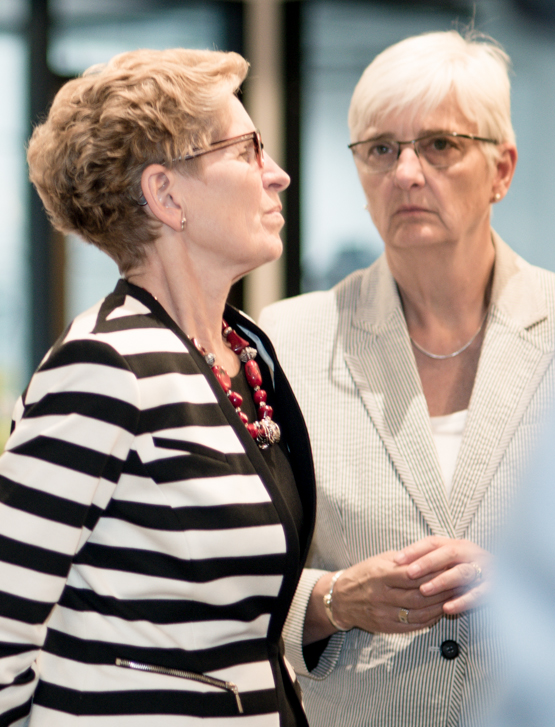
Wynne with partner Jane Rounthwaite at an event at the Centre for Social Innovation in 2015.

Kathleen Wynne, under the advice of Ed Clark, partially privatized Hydro One and reformed the Alcohol and Gaming Commission of Ontario's Liquor Licence Act to allow the sale of six-packs of beer in Ontario grocery stores, the latter of which was the result of a Toronto Star exclusive on the anti-competitive practices made by the privately owned Beer Store.

Wynne also put transit expansion front and centre in the budget. On April 21, 2015, Wynne announced that the provincial government would foot the entire bill for the construction of the Hurontario–Main LRT in the Region of Peel, to connect Mississauga with Brampton, a major infrastructure project in one of the fastest growing regions of the province.

On May 26, 2015, Wynne announced that the provincial government would fund 100 per cent of the costs to build a LRT system in Hamilton. Wynne announced that $1 billion would be allocated for the project, with construction slated to get underway in 2019. Wynne also announced the extension of the Lakeshore GO Line from downtown Hamilton to a new station at Centennial Parkway in Stoney Creek.

=== 2016 budget ===
The 2016 budget projected $133.9 billion in spending resulting in a deficit of $4.3 billion for 2016–17, with a return to a balanced budget in 2017–18. The province unveiled its climate change plan, which introduced a phased-in cap-and-trade plan that will be similar to schemes in California and Quebec. As a result, gasoline prices increased by 4.3 cents per litre in 2017 and natural gas rates rose by 3.3 cents per cubic metre. In education, the provincial government announced it would provide free college and university tuition for students from families with an annual household income of less than $50,000.

The province's debt in 2016 was $296.1 billion and was expected to rise to $350 billion by 2020–21.

=== Job approval rating ===
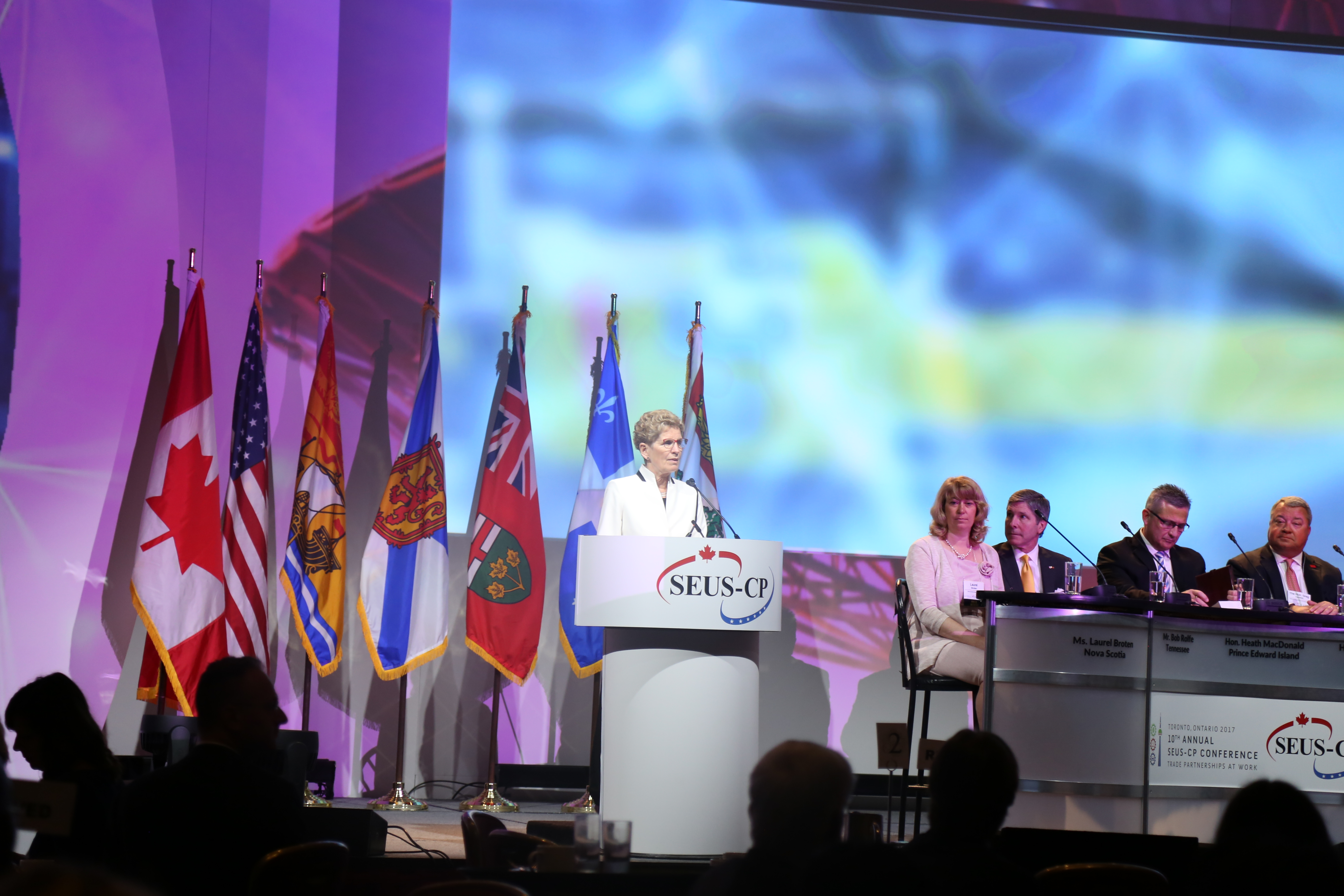
Wynne speaking in 2017

In June 2016, a Forum Research Poll reported that Wynne's approval rating had dropped from a high of 40 per cent to 18 per cent. In September 2016, a Forum Research poll reported that the Progressive Conservatives enjoyed 45 per cent support. Wynne's Liberals enjoyed 25 per cent support, slightly ahead of the provincial New Democrats at 23 per cent.

In March 2017 the Angus Reid Institute reported that her job approval rating had fallen to 12 per cent, the lowest ever recorded.

=== Negativity on social media ===
Wynne has faced negativity on social media outlets, such as Twitter and Facebook. Although most of the negative tweets express anger solely about her record as premier, some include sexist and/or homophobic slurs. Her sexual orientation is said to have made her more vulnerable to these abuses. Although Wynne faces sexist and homophobic abuse, she was confident that the situation can change "but it’s going to mean that people are going to have to speak up".

=== Alberta legislature incident ===
During an Alberta legislative session in May 2016, Wynne appeared as a special guest in the Alberta Legislature. During this session, Wildrose Party MLA (Member of the Legislative Assembly) and finance critic Derek Fildebrandt attacked her economic policies by calling Ontario a "fiscal basket case". When the Wildrose party expressed "regret" over his comments, one of his constituents made a homophobic comment on Fildebrandt's Facebook page, which he responded to by saying that he was "proud of constituents like you". Afterwards, Wynne spoke out against the party, stating that they were "out of step" with reality. Fildebrandt was expelled from the Wildrose caucus, but was later re-admitted, after he apologized and claimed that his support of the homophobic comment on Facebook had been "an honest mistake". Wynne accepted his apology via an interview with the Toronto Star.

=== Leading to the 2018 election ===
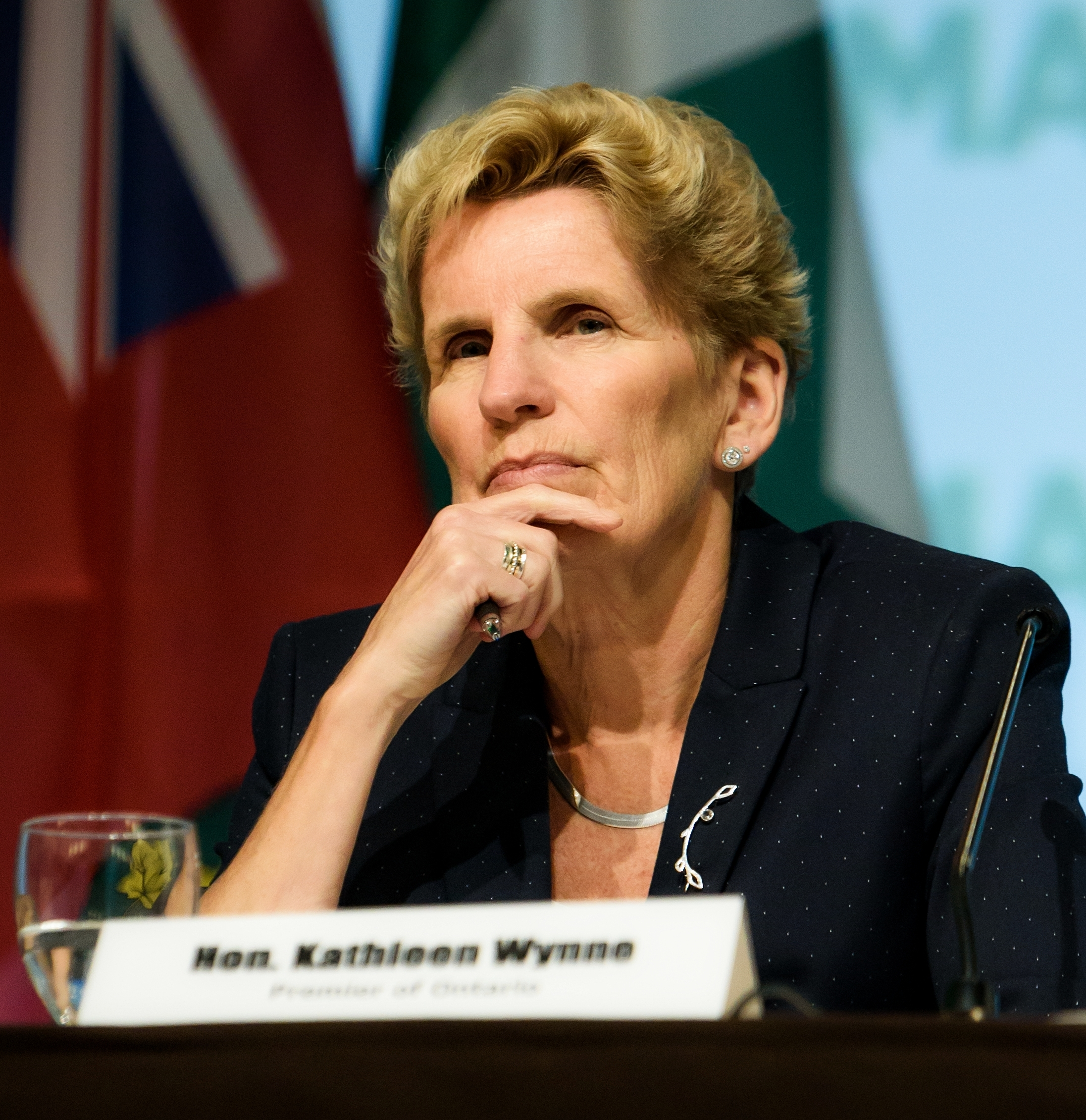
Wynne at the 2018 Rural Ontario Municipal Association Conference.

In 2016, the government spent almost $800,000 in rebates for electric vehicles costing more than $100,000. In 2017, the rules were changed so that electric vehicles with price tags of between $75,000 to $150,000 were made eligible for rebates of up to $14,000. In March 2018, Wynne's government cancelled incentives for electric vehicles costing more than $75,000. In March 2017, the Liberal government announced "free tuition" for families earning less than $50,000 by updating the Ontario Student Assistance Program (OSAP). Ontario's minimum wage increased $2.40 from $11.60 to $14 effective from January 1, 2018. Wynne also planned to increase the minimum wage to $15 the following year. Also from January 1, 2018, Wynne made prescription drugs free for people aged 24 and under.

=== 2018 election ===
Wynne's Liberals headed into the 2018 provincial election campaign trailing far behind the PCs, led by former Toronto City Councillor Doug Ford. In early April, CBC News published their analysis of aggregate polls showing that Ford and the PCs were ahead of the other parties averaging 42.1 per cent support, compared to 27.2 per cent for the governing Liberals, 23.4 percent for the NDP and 5.7 per cent for the Greens and with 11 Liberal MPPs announcing they would not be running for re-election or having already resigned their seats in the months leading up to the election.

Voters were offered a "stark choice", according to Wynne, between "cutting and removing supports from people" with "billions in cuts", which she alleged the PCs would do if they won the election, and expanding investments in social programs such as pharmacare and childcare, which the Liberal platform promised.

In March 2018, the Liberals tabled a pre-election budget in the provincial legislature which promised billions of dollars in new spending for free childcare and expanded dental care but replaced the government's previous balanced budget with a $6.7 billion deficit projected to last until 2024–2025. PC leader Doug Ford called the budget a "spending spree". Towards the end of the election, Wynne pledged to recall the legislature in order to legislate striking graduate students at York University back to work, which NDP leader Andrea Horwath stated was a violation of the students' constitutional rights.

On June 2, five days before the election, Wynne conceded that the Liberals would not win a fifth term, but she urged voters to vote for Liberal candidates in the election to ensure a PC or NDP minority. Nevertheless, the election resulted in a PC majority government with the NDP as the official opposition. The Liberals lost almost half their vote from 2013 and were reduced to seven seats, their worst result since Confederation, and one short of the eight seats needed for official party status. Notably, the Liberals were decimated in the Golden Horseshoe; they won only three seats in Toronto, and lost all of their seats in the 905 region. They also won only one seat outside of Toronto and Ottawa. The seven-member rump caucus was also the only remnant of Wynne's cabinet. Wynne narrowly held onto her own riding of Don Valley West, winning by only 181 votes. She announced her resignation as Liberal Party leader on election night. On June 29, 2018, Wynne formally resigned as premier. Lieutenant Governor Elizabeth Dowdeswell appointed Doug Ford as her successor.

On October 20, 2020, Wynne announced that she would not be a candidate in the 43rd Ontario general election.

=== Wynne's cabinet portfolios (2013–2018) ===
Wynne ministry, Province of Ontario (2013–2018)
Cabinet posts (3)
Predecessor	Office	Successor
Dalton McGuinty	Premier of Ontario; 2013–2018	Doug Ford
Laurel Broten	Minister of Intergovernmental Affairs; 2013–2018	Doug Ford
Ted McMeekin	Minister of Agriculture and Food; 2013–2014	Jeff Leal

== Post-politics ==
In 2021, Wynne was appointed as the Hon. Newton W. Rowell Professor at Victoria College, University of Toronto.

== Electoral record ==
2018 Ontario general election: Don Valley West
Party	Candidate	Votes	%	±%
Liberal	Kathleen Wynne	17,802	38.89%	-18.12
Progressive Conservative	Jon Kieran	17,621	38.49%	+7.86
New Democratic	Amara Possian	8,620	18.83%	+11.07
Green	Morgan Bailey	1,268	2.77%	-0.03
Libertarian	John Kittredge	380	0.83%	+0.09
Canadian Economic	Patrick Geoffrey Knight	86	0.19%	N/A
Total valid votes		45,777	100.0	
Source: Elections Ontario
Liberal hold		Swing		

2014 Ontario general election: Don Valley West
Party	Candidate	Votes	%	±%
Liberal	Kathleen Wynne	26,215	57.01	-1.31
Progressive Conservative	David Porter	14,082	30.63	+0.03
New Democratic	Khalid Ahmed	3,569	7.76	-0.88
Green	Louis Fliss	1,286	2.80	+1.09
Libertarian	Patrick Boyd	338	0.74	
Communist	Dimitrios Kabitsis	153	0.33	+0.03
Independent	Brock Burrows	138	0.30	
Vegan Environmental	Rosemary Waigh	116	0.25	-0.01
Freedom	Tracy Curley	83	0.18	
Total valid votes		45,980	100.0	
Liberal hold		Swing		-0.67
Source: Elections Ontario

2011 Ontario general election: Don Valley West
Party	Candidate	Votes	%	±%
Liberal	Kathleen Wynne	24,444	58.32	+7.88
Progressive Conservative	Andrea Mandel-Campbell	12,827	30.60	-9.08
New Democratic	Khalid Ahmed	3,621	8.64	+3.97
Green	Louis Fliss	718	1.71	-3.10
Communist	Dimitris Kabitsis	125	0.30	
Independent (Vegan Environmental Party)	Rosemary Waigh	108	0.26	
Independent	Soumen Deb	74	0.18	
Total valid votes		41,917	100.00	
Liberal hold		Swing		+8.48
Source: Elections Ontario.

2007 Ontario general election: Don Valley West
Party	Candidate	Votes	%	±%
Liberal	Kathleen Wynne	23,080	50.44	-2.15
Progressive Conservative	John Tory	18,156	39.68	+0.72
Green	Adrian Walker	2,202	4.81	+2.05
New Democratic	Mike Kenny	2,138	4.67	-1.02
Family Coalition	Daniel Kidd	183	0.40	
Total valid votes		45,759	100.00	
Liberal hold		Swing		-1.44
Source: Elections Ontario.

2003 Ontario general election: Don Valley West
Party	Candidate	Votes	%	±%
Liberal	Kathleen Wynne	23,488	52.59	+8.97
Progressive Conservative	David Turnbull	17,394	38.95	-11.57
New Democratic	Ali Naqvi	2,540	5.69	+1.00
Green	Philip Hawkins	1,239	2.77	
Total valid votes		44,661	100.00	
Liberal gain from Progressive Conservative		Swing		+10.27
Source: Elections Ontario.

== See also ==
- List of openly LGBT heads of government
- List of the first LGBT holders of political offices in Canada
