= Economic impact of immigration to Canada =

The economic impact of immigration to Canada is dominated by two conflicting narratives: higher immigration levels increase GDP but decrease GDP per capita or living standards for the resident population and lead to diseconomies of scale in terms of overcrowding of hospitals, schools and recreational facilities, deteriorating environment, increase in cost of services, and an increase in cost of housing. A commonly supported argument is that impact of immigration on GDP is not an effective metric for immigration. Another narrative regarding immigration is the replacement of the aging workforce. However, some economists note that increasing immigration rates is not an entirely effective strategy to counter it. Increased immigration numbers and the resulting surge in housing prices significantly contributed to the rise of inflation in 2021 to an 18-year high, while the immigration caps introduced in 2025 have been linked to increasing housing affordability through a positive drop in average asking monthly rents, ranging from 2 to 8 percent in several major cities.

Canada is one of the top Western countries in terms of per capita immigrant acceptance. The per capita immigration rate to Canada has been relatively constant since the 1950s. However, in the first and second decades of the 21st century, there was a steady increase in the education and skill level of immigrants to Canada. This was due to the focus on higher average productivity-based applicants, resulting in immigrants to Canada being, on average, better educated than Canadians. This trend was enhanced for income redistribution in the third decade of the 21st century by opening low-skilled immigrant pathways with minimal immigration score requirements to reach a target of 400,000 immigrants annually. This has cemented a new narrative on immigration: immigration is to fill low-skilled jobs and alleviate competitive labor market pressures faced by businesses that use cheap labor. Starting in 2022, the Trudeau government has set immigration targets influenced by the Century Initiative's lobbying. Over a million immigrants were targeted in 2022, followed by 465,000 immigrants in 2023, 485,000 immigrants in 2024, and a projection of 500,000 immigrants in 2025. Across Canada, people have been asking the government to match affordable housing to the set immigration levels, while the government annually welcomes 500,000 new permanent residents, and more than 800,000 foreign nationals into the country on study visas, as asylum seekers, and on temporary work visas. A Canadian journalist highlighted the poor preparedness for receiving immigrants in swathes, pointing to Canada's historic need for a "servant class" and "cheap labor" for the bourgeoisie and the owning class. Furthermore, the journalist observed that Canada's failure to address or neutralize the social and professional barriers for immigrants suggests it is not as welcoming as it purports to be. This policy of inaction silently perpetuates the creation of a servant class within the country's diverse mosaic. As a part of the process, by default, the government systematically forces a majority of immigrants into vulnerable positions and economic disenfranchisement.

An article by an ex-policy maker states that Canada is rooting for the low-wage-low-productivity model of competitiveness that it has been locked in since the mid-1980s with the immigration targets, a problematic approach according to Paul Krugman in the long term, and which the ex-policy maker also endorses by stating that throwing more cheap labor at problems without a significant increase in productivity will affect a country's ability to improve its standard of living over time. Some economists also warn that sustaining low productivity and the permanent integration of low-skilled temporary residents or foreign workers would lead to forced tax increases to manage associated government costs. The article further observes that it is imperative that Canada and the "government for the people" require a fundamental re-commitment to pre-1970s dominating national objective and efforts for a steady improvement in raising the living standard of Canadians by embracing the supply and demand concept of labor economics, and improving the economic efficiency of the system. A former director from Quebec's Ministry of Immigration observed that the government needs to treat people better, as their lives and families' futures are at stake.

== Overview ==
=== Immigration to Canada ===
According to the CIA's World Factbook (2017), Canada has one of the highest migration rates in the world. Canada is also unusual among western nations in the widespread popular support for high rates of immigration, and a 2007 study showed support for immigration has increased in Canada despite its impact on cultural erosion. Canada's immigration policy, which focuses on selecting immigrants based on their skills and qualifications to meet labor market demands, as well as supporting irregular immigrants in need, reinforces the public perception that immigrants are making a positive contribution to the economy and that the system preserves human dignity as economic conditions permit. However, assessing the economic effectiveness of the immigration policy is challenging due to the complex interplay of capitalist dynamics, societal influences, and political factors on the lives of immigrants.

In 2023, a Statistics Canada report revealed that the notion of a widespread labor shortage in Canada is no longer substantial. The report found that jobs requiring higher education consistently had fewer available positions and highlighted that the hiring challenges for positions requiring post-secondary education are not due to a lack of qualified workers but because of a mismatch in skills that could be solved with ongoing training and deflated entry requirements, and inadequate wages that could be fortified with desirable benefits or competitive wages. The report also raised doubts about the hiring difficulties faced by firms trying to recruit workers with lower levels of education. It raised questions whether these job vacancies are solely a result of labor shortages in specific low-skilled occupations that might demand higher wages or if factors such as greater negotiating power and profit maximization that the low-skilled industries enjoy play a significant role. According to Jim Stanford, an economist and the director of the Centre for Future Work, the goal of immigration policy should not be solely focused on solving recruitment problems for low-wage employers or to bolster the mass immigration industrial complex, but rather on broader considerations that benefit the country and its people as a whole.

In 2024, despite years of per capita recession and housing affordability issues, the Liberal government has increased the intake of permanent residents, issuing around 35,000 invitations per month and boosting the population by over 410,000 within the first four months of the year, a 47% increase compared to the same period in 2023. Concurrently, Canada is rapidly transitioning temporary residents holding jobs that require basic college education. The immigration department also outlined its plans to offer permanent resident opportunities to individuals with educational backgrounds ranging from none to a maximum of high school education, aimed at meeting the demand for cheap, low-skilled labor through programs like the Canadian Experience Class, without considering the long-term negative impacts. A Fraser Institute study indicates that Canada's standard of living is on course for its sharpest decline since 1985, with a rapid deterioration starting in mid-2019. An Ipsos survey of 1,001 Canadians indicates that many feel their institutions are broken, suffer from personal underachievement due to a lack of rewarding opportunities, and have lost a sense of togetherness, with most concluding that the "country is broken." Additionally, a report from Food Banks Canada estimates that 1 in 4 Canadians are living in poverty. Meanwhile, Australian economists are using Canada as a cautionary example for Australia's economy if their government continues with extreme immigration policies.

=== Economic rationale for immigration ===
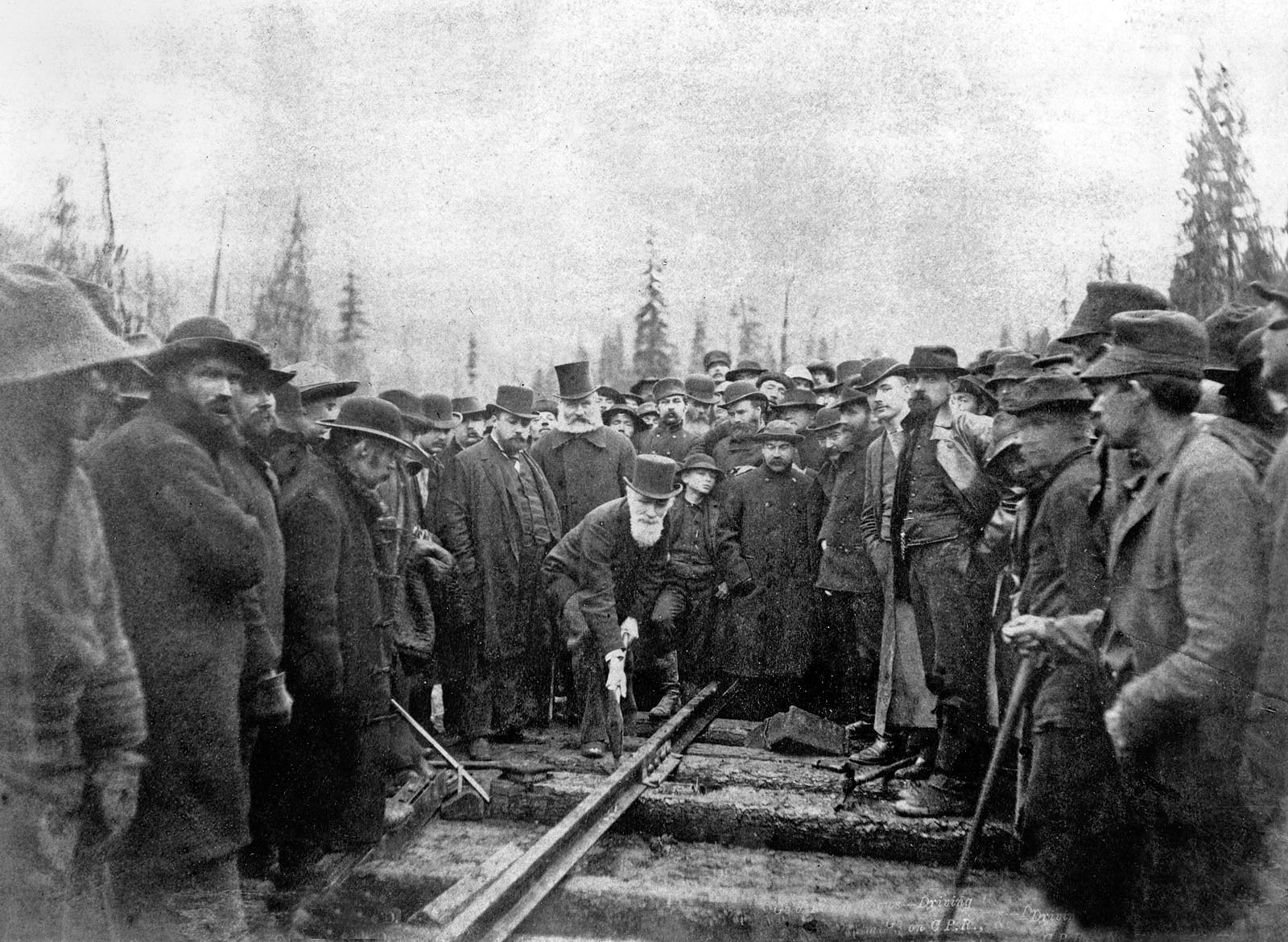
Donald Alexander Smith, a migrant from Scotland, drives the Last Spike. Migrants to Canada at that time were British subjects (not Canadian citizens).

There is no agreed view on the net impact of immigration in current times. Historically, Canada's unusually high immigration rates can be traced to the nation's unique economy. Another factor is that Canada has one of the world's largest supplies of natural resources such as oil, metals, and lumber. It also has a sparse population spread over a vast landscape. Canada has thus faced acute labour shortages and has responded by actively searching for immigrants. In the late 19th century this included bringing Chinese migrants to build the Canadian Pacific Railway and actively advertising in Europe to find farmers with the Last Best West campaign. Today similar recruitment efforts are needed to staff the oil sands projects in Alberta.

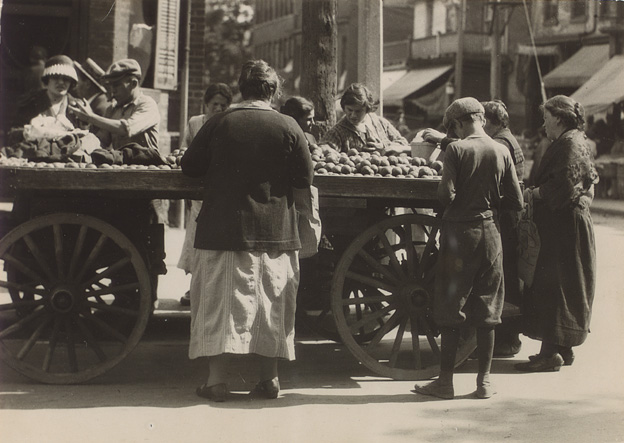
Toronto's Jewish market in 1924. In that era the Jewish community, largely composed of recent immigrants, was concentrated in the impoverished area known as The Ward.

Another factor that contributes to the immigration question is Canada's low birth rate (10.3 births per 1000 people). The theory is that new residents can assist in meeting future government obligations relating to pay-as-you-go liabilities.

The economic dangers of population decline are not universally accepted. Organizations like the Fraser Institute question whether a declining population would reduce or increase per capita income, noting that in the short term, with a stable economy, fewer people would increase the per capita income simply because you divide the income among fewer people. This would increase per-head consumption and create a climate of economic well-being that could nurture pro-family values and policies which can increase Canada's birth rate. A study by the C. D. Howe Institute suggests that immigration cannot keep Canada's population young and could possibly contribute to population ageing in the near term. Due to socioeconomic processes and increased levels of immigration, skilled worker immigrants are being converted into a precariat class, with a 34% unemployment rate in 2001, raising questions about whether they are successfully meeting existing labor market needs in Canada. This class conversion among landed immigrants in 2020 was shown to be 9.5%, according to the unemployment rate.

The first detailed analysis of Canadian immigration policy came from the Economic Council of Canada; it called for immigration to be increased to eventually bring Canada's population to 100 million. While it found that the economic benefits to Canada of immigration were fairly small, noting that "a historical perspective gives little or no support to the view that immigration is needed for national prosperity," it also concluded that the benefits to the newcomers themselves were extremely large. The report concluded that "it would be hard not to recommend an increase when immigrants can gain so much and Canadians not only do not lose but actually make slight economic gains." Economists from the libertarian-conservative Fraser Institute later conducted a series of studies using large amounts of census data (844,476 individuals) and found out that immigrants who arrived from 1987 to 2004 paid only 57% of the taxes paid by average Canadian in 2006, with the effect that taxes from immigrants do not exceed the government expenses relating to them (a gap of $23 billion annually according to their numbers).

=== Racialization and its Economic Impact ===
Recent immigrants are far more likely than native-born Canadians to have low incomes initially, due to differences in culture, difficulties due to English being their second language, discrimination, and racialization. The employment equity policy prescriptions are not translated into programs that help immigrants to participate in the economy on an equal footing with other Canadians in a hostile labor market. All of which, a native-born Canadian initially would have to get into a workplace. A 2006 Canadian government report shows that 22 percent of racialized persons lived in poverty compared to 9 percent of non-racialized persons, and in major cities more than half of the people living in poverty were those who were racialized, and the comparative poverty rate was growing. Later, in a 2019 study, it was found that the rate of poverty amongst recent immigrants is 2.4 times higher than that of native-born Canadians, and this was identified as an ever-widening trend. In certain cities there are active local immigration partnerships that aid immigrants in getting jobs, however a network of community based wraparound services through existing community organization's are not available. A 2001 study found successful cultural subjectivation is possible if young people are considered for immigration, the study found a positive correlation between age and earnings for immigrants with acculturation effect, and the study observed it in immigrants who were visible minorities or whose mother tongue was not English. A 2003 study found that with then lack of support systems that can directly address socioeconomic problems of immigrants in a racialised society, and related lack of qualitative job accessibility, it would take more than 20 years of Canadian experience to achieve any positive economic gains. Established studies show educational achievement and rewriting policies to recognise education is critical for gaining higher incomes for overcoming the poverty trap and achieving poverty reduction. On an intergenerational level, if parents can avoid poverty, so will their children. In Canada's case, with its high-skilled immigration model, it is partly about being insulated from racialization at various levels.

=== Positive impact ===
Immigration has become a dominant driver of Canadian economy and population in the 21st century. By 2021, nearly one quarter (~23%) of Canadian population was foreign born, the highest share since confederation. Canada's working-age population growth has been almost entirely due to immigration.

Over the past two decades, immigration has exerted a net positive impact on the Canadian economy, primarily through its contributions to population expansion and labor force augmentation, which have significantly driven gross domestic product (GDP) growth and fostered innovation. Furthermore, immigration has played a pivotal role in addressing critical skill shortages, enabling the fulfillment of labor market demands in essential sectors, including engineering, medicine, healthcare, and various other specialized fields. At the same time, immigration has posed challenges such as housing strain and problems with societal integration of immigrants.

=== Economic Output ===
Immigration substantially boosts GDP by expanding the labour force and consumer market. An analysis by Bank of Canada finds that immigrants have added roughly 2.5 percentage points to Canada's potential output in just two years (2023–24). Similarly, Scotiabank estimates that, without the immigrant population of Quebec and Ontario (~17% and ~34% of working age respectively), Ontario's GDP would be 20% smaller and Quebec's 9% smaller. Historical immigration has underpinned about one-fifth of Ontario's economic size. In 2023, new federal immigration levels were projected to add another C$2.9 billion to Ontario's real GDP (about +0.8 percentage points) and C$0.9 billion to Quebec's real GDP (+0.5 percentage points).

=== Labour market and workforce participation ===
Immigrants play a crucial role in meeting labour demand. In the 2010s, for example immigrant workers accounted for over 84% of labour force growth in Canada, filling both high-skilled and essential service jobs. Immigrants helped create 55% of new high and medium skill positions and even offset declines in some low-skilled occupations by Canadian born workers.

Many industries rely heavily on immigrants and temporary workers. For instance, in 2021 it was found that 44.5% Canadian businesses struggled to fill roles, which led to Express Entry selections to target occupations from healthcare and STEM to trade and agriculture. Immigrants also have contributed in growth of two-thirds of Ontario's work force since the mid-2010s.

Immigration also boosts overall labour-force participation. Recent immigrants (<10 years) have contributed to the rapid rise of employment rates. Between 2010 and 2021, the employment rate for core-aged immigrants rose 8 points to 77%. After the 2020s, most immigrants enter with postsecondary credentials (over 80% of Ontario's recent immigrants are university educated), and often have pre-arrival work or study experience, which improves the labour market attachment. Immigrants are major contributors to healthcare and technical service fields. By 2021, immigrants comprised about 25% of healthcare sector workers in Canada despite harder educational and merit requirements in comparison to Canadian medical graduates.

=== Wage dynamics and effect on income ===
Immigration has nuanced effect on wages. Recent Canadian data shows strong growth in immigrant earnings, especially entry wages. In 2022, the real median entry wage for new immigrants rose by 6.7%, even though the median wage of all Canadians dropped by 1.6%. Economic class immigrants consistently earn the most, in 2022 skilled economic principal applicants had a median first-year wage of $52,400.

The immediate wage impact on Canadian-born workers appears minimal in the short term. However, studies reveal a growing wage gap between non-permanent immigrants and their Canadian-born counterparts, increasing from 9.5% in 2006–14 to 22.6% in 2023–24, indicating that Canadian-born workers consistently earn higher wages. However permanent legal immigrants consistently earn higher than the national average after a decade of residence, reflecting work experience, training and consumer demand.

=== Productivity and innovation ===
Immigration affects productivity in complex ways. On one hand, high immigration has diluted measured average labour productivity, due to the occupance of low-skilled jobs. The OECD notes that Canada's GDP per capita has lagged peers partly because "lower productivity of recent immigrants, comprising many low-skilled non-permanent residents", weighed on output per worker.

On the other hand, immigrants contribute specialised skill and innovation. Research consistently finds immigrantion brings positive human capital. For example, firms owned by immigrants with a doctorate had ~16% higher labour productivity than firms whose owner had only a high school diploma. Firms owned by immigrants holding a master's degree were among the most productive firms in Canada. Moreover, a large share of recent immigrants have STEM background (nearly 1.4 million in 2021), enriching Canadian innovation capacity.

=== Housing market shortages ===
Rapid immigration has intensified housing demand, especially in major cities such as Toronto, Vancouver and Montreal. OECD and Bank of Canada report that strong non-permanent immigration has led to increase in unsustainable housing demand, adding pressure on prices and rents. Empirical evidence suggests housing prices and rents have risen much faster than income, driven by demand outstripping supply. Even though, international students spent $37.3 billion, in 2022, translating into $30.9 billion GDP, but it further fuelled increasing housing prices. For example, Ontario's foreign students contributed $16.9 billion to GDP in 2022, most of the funds circulated around housing and services.

=== Public finances and fiscal impact ===
Immigrants affect public finances through taxes paid versus services used. Many analyses find that working age immigrants pay significant taxes. For instance, immigrant entrepreneurs in Canada pay 16% more taxes per employee than firms majority owned by Canadian-born citizens. While international students' spending indirectly generated $7.4 billion in tax revenues in 2022. Furthermore, two-thirds of recent immigrants are prime working age adults, helping to fund pensions and healthcare by expanding the tax base. In aggregate, economists generally conclude that skilled immigrants contribute more in taxes over their lifetimes than the cost of public services they consume such as subsidized healthcare, education, etc.

=== Regional variations ===
Immigration impact can vary by province and territory. Ontario absorbs roughly half of the new immigrants. A recent report noted that immigrants now comprise 34% of working class in the province. These immigrants have driven high growth; in 2021 Scotiabank estimated Ontario's GDP would be C$157 billion (20%) lower without its immigrant workforce.

Quebec selects its own immigrants favouring French speakers and its immigrant share is comparatively lower and around 17% of its workforce. Nonetheless, Quebec's economy is also heavily reliant on skilled immigration. In 2019, newcomers accounted for 52% of full-time jobs in Quebec. Without immigrants, Quebec's GDP would be 9% lower. Quebec has seen notable population growth from international students and temporary workers, a trend that has filled labour gaps in manufacturing and services.

Alberta similarly experienced a population surge (about 4.4% growth in 2024) largely due to immigration. Alberta's economy, led by energy, has leaned on immigration to boost the workforce. However, Alberta faces high out-migration to other provinces, due to tech opportunities in British Columbia and Ontario primarily. Alberta's official outlook expects a drop in immigration and slowing in population growth to 1.4% in 2026. However, Alberta faces chronic labour shortages in healthcare, agriculture and technology, and continues to recruit immigrants under its Provincial Nominee Program (PNP).

British Columbia has one of the highest migrant concentrations. According to the 2021 Canadian census, 42% of population of Vancouver is foreign born. The province offers various opportunities in tech, film, healthcare, education and service industries. In 2022, international students in BC contributed around $5.7 billion to GDP.

== Immigrant wellbeing ==
=== Education levels ===
The Canadian system puts great emphasis on finding skilled immigrants. Immigrants to Canada are more skilled than immigrants to the United States. George J. Borjas compared immigrants to Canada and the United States finding those to Canada being better educated and receiving higher wages once settled. He accredits this to Canadian neoliberal economy.

Within the Canadian economy, immigrants are mostly found at the highest education levels. In Canada, 38% of male workers with a post-graduate degree are immigrants to the country, and while 23% of Canadians are foreign-born, they comprise 49% of doctorate holders. A persistent problem for skilled immigrants is the recognition of foreign credentials. Data from Statistics Canada reports that only 72.2% of new immigrants (landed within 5 years) between the ages of 25 and 54 that possess a university degree are employed. While Canada recruits people to come based on their degrees, many newcomers arrive to find employers and professional organizations not recognizing their foreign education. As the percentage of skilled newcomers as a share of total migrants has increased, so has this problem. A study done by the IZA Journal of Development and Migration found that between 1991 and 2006, Canadian-educated immigrants and foreign-educated immigrants found that Canadian-educated immigrants who graduated from university had a large earnings gap with their Canadian-born counterparts both in the initial years after immigration and in the long run. It was speculated that this outcome was likely due to lack of Canadian work experience and deficiencies in their social networks and language abilities.

The setting of standards for, or recognition of, almost all professional credentials does not fall within the federal government's control and are therefore not determined by either federal laws or Citizenship and Immigration Canada policies, but Citizenship and Immigration Canada established the Foreign Credentials Referral Office to provide something like a directory assistance service for immigrants. The Government of Ontario enacted the Fair Access to Regulated Professions Act, 2006 to help immigrants qualify for 34 provincially regulated professions. The Act also established the position of Fairness Commissioner in the province. In 2007, the Government of Alberta signed an agreement with federal government that will accelerate the process of foreign credential recognition for new immigrants by licensing bodies in that province. Other provinces have made similar commitments.

=== Decline in economic well-being ===
Over the last 25 years the economic position of newcomers to Canada relative to the native population has steadily declined. A number of hypotheses have been advanced to explain these issues.

1. The selection process is flawed.
2. Government and corporate policies deliberately shift immigrants to secondary sector occupations. These are jobs characterized by high instability, hazardous work environments, and low pay. Inherently those involved in these sectors will have lower wages and more periods of unemployment. In several European countries the immigration system is almost fully designed to try to fill these positions. This is less the case in Canada, but significant recruitment programs for sectors such as agriculture and oil and gas recruit many workers to perilous jobs.
3. Newer immigrants from outside of Europe are victims of racial discrimination.
4. Canada's social programs create incentives that conflict with the employment objective.
5. Increased job competition among even native-born Canadians has increased the importance of relying on networking to access the "hidden market," putting immigrants at a disadvantage given their lack of deep and broad networks.

A January 2007 study by Statistics Canada analyzed the drop in income of economic immigrants from several perspectives. Economic immigrants are now more likely to begin their stay in Canada with a "low-income" (less than 50% of the median income) than an immigrant in any of the other immigration classes (see Table 16 in the study). This drop occurred during the 1990s and early 2000s despite the percentage of immigrants arriving with degrees in the economic class (including principal applicants, spouses, and dependents) rising from 29% in 1992 to 56% in 2003.

Stating an intention to reduce a backlog of immigration applicants of all classes, and to better target the required skills needed in Canada, the federal government passed a law in 2008 that gave the immigration minister new powers to alter immigrant selection. Many expected that these powers would be used to favour workers in skilled trades over immigrants selected on the basis of education through the points system.

While the well-being of immigrants has declined in recent years, this has not affected second-generation immigrants, or those who came to Canada as a child. This group is one of the most successful in Canada, with education and earning levels well above that of their parents and also above the Canadian average.

==== COVID-19 ====
In 2020, the Canadian government has planned to support economic recovery through increased immigration adding further strain to the socioeconomic system while other countries like New Zealand had a different COVID-19 recovery immigration strategy. The official Canadian government website quotes "Immigrants contribute to our economy, not only by filling gaps in our labor force and paying taxes, but also by spending money on goods, housing and transportation." A problematic aspect of this narrative is that it presents a distorted view and an illusion of novelty, as the same holds true for citizens and other capitalistic countries that also use young and changing temporary foreign workforce for achieving its economic needs and driving down wages.

In pre-pandemic period the notion for aggressive immigration was to increase the tax base for supporting a growing number of Canadian seniors through old age security and GIS. During the pandemic, it was re-framed as a "secret weapon to supercharge the country’s economic recovery." As a part of pursuing Century Initiatives goal, some never-before-seen immigration changes were made in 2021 to expand pathways to permanent residency for international students and temporary foreign workers. These changes included lowering scores, considering the passing of an academic program, removing English and French language proficiency test result requirement, and eliminating work experience requirement, this solidified the notion that getting a study permit is an unofficially recognized pathway for getting Canadian residency, some considered this to be cracks in the immigration system, as a backdoor to residency, and others as a convoluted pathway for migrant justice. More such changes were underway in 2022. However, these changes and promotions were heavily critiqued, stating it would increase worker mobility from low-wage sectors to sectors with better pay, and the temporary workforce in odious sectors will be unwilling to work in low wages and unappealing working conditions as Canadian workforce are (and it was evident from the 74% increase in job vacancies in the sector after the first TR to PR scheme) or it could change employer behaviors and the currently suffering category without temporary workforce will even suffer more. Stephen Punwasi, co-founder of the data journalism website Better Dwelling, evaluates Canadian immigration plans are becoming a snow job and predatory in nature, though Canadian liberal populism actively rejects the notion of needing modern slaves and have stated its commitment to promote temporary workforce into permanent residents while lamenting the need of workforce in categories where majority of temporary workforce are employed. During the pandemic, from grassroot level investigation's in the refugees category it was found out that most refugees are ending up "on the street," and critiques recommend that Canada should not accept more refugees without proper systems that can ensure their welfare.

The pandemic tagline for immigration was strongly promoted through other governmental stakeholders as well. Pedro Antunes, Chief Economist at Conference Board of Canada, based on forecasts stated that "Immigration continues to be an important driver of Canada’s social and economic well-being, especially as we recover from the COVID-19 pandemic." As a part of this liberal vision in 2022 the government lifted off 20 hours work limit for international students and gave employers more supply of labor at an external cost (negative) for majority of the resident population. Another government impact assessment stated that "high immigration levels have been recognized by the Bank of Canada as a net benefit for the economy, driving labor force growth, consumption, and housing activity." This was when Canada intensively started to face a heightened housing crisis due to unplanned affordable housing development, and looming questions like whether low-skilled workers should be integrated completely or could they be brought in seasonally like many other countries do are present. Another study highlighted that in 2019–2020, during the pandemic, about $785M (outside Quebec) was allocated to more than 500 third-party settlement service provider organizations across Canada. However, the list of these third-party settlement providers, their active status, and their service achievements are not available for public access, raising questions about the efficacy and transparency of the publicly funded immigrant integration programs. The integrity of these organizations comes under further scrutiny because they state that increased immigration could increase investment and improvements in the labor market integration process of immigrants itself, such as addressing underemployment, language training (while the immigration program already has standardized test result submission to qualify for immigration), and improving foreign credential recognition (which already exists and is a part of the immigration application).

Focusing on immigration as a solution towards generating tax revenue and filling up unwanted jobs was considered to be flogging a dead horse due to the meager amount in returns, the population effect that increased immigration levels affect negatively on the per capita public transfer to a citizen, the withheld taxes from actual income due to immigrants often coerced and unable to engage in the formal economy, the regulatory bindings without support that force immigrant workforce into complementary job statuses and resulting in the counterproductive waste of human capital, underemployment, and mismatched jobs (horizontal and vertical), etc. Apart from the government's display of strategic incompetence, the lack of innovation or promoting meaningful innovation, lack of infrastructure for training required citizen workforce, lack of inclusivity for training the resident population through subsidies, bottlenecking of admissions to in-need and emerging professional programs, etc. disregards domestic population needs and their ability to meaningfully contribute to government expenditures.

In 2023, after the pandemic, Canada continued to increase immigration levels set by consultants to account for 1.08% of Canada's population with a new immigration tagline that immigrants will and continue to address Canada's critical housing development needs while cities were struggling with lack of infrastructure to hold current temporary residents, new permanent residents, and new citizens.

=== Long-term outcomes ===
One of the most important studies of the economic impact of immigration to Canada is Morton Beiser's Strangers at the Gate. This study looked at the arrival of the Vietnamese boat people who began to arrive in Canada in 1979 to much controversy. The total number of refugees was 60,000, the largest single group of refugees to ever arrive in Canada. Beiser first studied the boat people upon their arrival, finding that few spoke English or French, that most were farmers with few skills useful in Canada, and that they had arrived with no assets with which to establish themselves. Beiser then followed the progress of the boat people to see what effect they would have on Canada. Within ten years of arrival the boat people had an unemployment rate 2.3% lower than the Canadian average. One in five had started a business, 99% had successfully applied to become Canadian citizens, and they were considerably less likely than average to receive some form of social assistance.

== Immigrant employment and income ==
=== Employment ===
Unemployment tends to be very high for recent immigrants, compared to more established immigrants (lived in Canada between 5 and 10 years). Established immigrants tend to have an unemployment rate closer to the national unemployment rate of native-born citizens. In 2011, the unemployment rate of recently arrived immigrants was 13.6%, considerably above the native Canadian average of 5.5%. For more established immigrants, the rate fell to 8.2%.

2011 labour market outcomes of immigrants aged 25 to 54, by period of landing
Labour force	New Immigrants (landed within 5 years)	Established Immigrants (landed more than 5 to 10 years)	Native-born Canadians
Participation rate	73.5%	80.7%	87.8%
Employment rate (Note: Employment Rate = Participation Rate * (1 – Unemployment Rate))	63.5%	74.1%	82.9%
Unemployment rate	13.6%	8.2%	5.5%

=== Income ===
Latest studies by Statistics Canada in 2019 has found that the higher cumulative earnings of Chinese (+20%) and South Asian (+15%) men (immigrant groups) is much more relative to White men, while black men relatively earned lesser.

Cumulative lifetime earnings of Canadians by racial profile
Race	Male	Female
White	1,310,598	801,252
Chinese	1,577,490	1,139,957
South Asian (East Indians)	1,507,208	1,064,760
Black	1,061,037	815,906

Higher rates of unemployment and lower wages combine to give newcomers less income than the Canadian average. An analysis of Longitudinal Immigration Database by Statistics Canada showed that immigrants who landed in 2014, had a median income of $24,000 in 2015, compared to an income of $36,000 for native-born Canadians. The median income for new immigrants in 2015 was the highest ever recorded and $2,000 more than the median income of new immigrants in 2013. In previous decades, immigrant income levels did rise to the national average after 10 years, but in recent years the situation has deteriorated. A 2003 study published by Statistics Canada noted that "in 1980 recent immigrants had low-income rates 1.4 times that of Canadian born, by 2000 they were 2.5 times higher, at 35.8%." The study noted that the deterioration was widespread and affected most types of immigrants. The 2003 study explains that the low-income rate among non-immigrants declined in the 1990s, but this was more than offset by the income profile of new immigrants, resulting in a net rise in Canada's total low-income rate. An updated January 2007 study by Statistics Canada, explains that the deterioration continued into the next decade, with the low-income rate of recent immigrants reaching rates of 3.5 times that of Canadian born in 2002 and 2003, before edging back to 3.2 times in 2004. The 2007 study explains that this deterioration has occurred even though Canada implemented changes in 1993 to encourage more highly educated immigrants, with 45% of new immigrants having university degrees as of 2004.

In 1991, the Economic Council of Canada found that periods of immigration were not directly linked to periods of high growth. They noted that "a historical perspective gives little or no support to the view that immigration is needed for economic prosperity. In the 19th and early 20th centuries, the fastest growth in per capita real incomes occurred at times when net immigration was nil or negative. Later in the 20th century, the opposite linkage is seen but, clearly, there is no long-term correlation." However, the same report found that a high rate of immigration was good for Canada's future, and recommended expanding immigration rates to bring Canada's population to 100 million. A University of Montreal study published in 2002 by professor Marc Termote used different methods and studied different countries and concluded that immigration has no statistically significant impact to the per capita income of a country.

==== Wages ====
In a 2007 study, economists Abdurrahman Aydemir and George Borjas found that a 10% increase in the supply of workers within a specific education–experience group may reduce that group's wages by around 3–4%. However, these results should not be interpreted as a universal 4% drop for all Canadian workers whenever immigration rises by 10%, since Aydemir and Borjas were examining group-specific wage impacts. Statistics Canada has likewise noted that overall wage effects of immigration in Canada tend to be relatively small, with more noticeable impacts confined to particular skill segments or regions.

In part because of the credential issue, many immigrants are forced to find work below their education level and at lower wages. However, even for doing work of the same skill level, immigrants are much less well compensated than their native born counterparts. Immigration scholar Jeffrey Reitz calculated that in 2001 native Canadian employers were benefiting from, and immigrant employees were losing out on, between $2 and 3 billion per year due to this imbalance. A study published by Statistics Canada reviewed data from 1991 to 2010 regarding the convergence of wages between immigrants and native-born Canadians. The study found that there was a convergence of relative earnings for immigrants. Immigrant men's average annual wages were 86% of those of native-born men in 2010, up from 76% in 1991.

There are a number of possible explanations for why newcomers earn less than native Canadians in the same jobs with the same skills. Lower hourly wages might be an indication that the labour productivity of immigrants is lower, and employers thus have reason to pay them less. New workers are also less familiar with the Canadian labour market and will thus not be able to maximize their salaries. Employers will also be less familiar with an immigrant's background and thus less willing to offer the same salary as to a native. Due to lower mobility, they do not access better-paying jobs, such as in Alberta and Saskatchewan. This has been changing with Calgary already surpassing Montreal in terms of percentage of visible minorities. Visible minorities in Saskatchewan earn higher wages than native-born Canadians.

== Wider effects ==
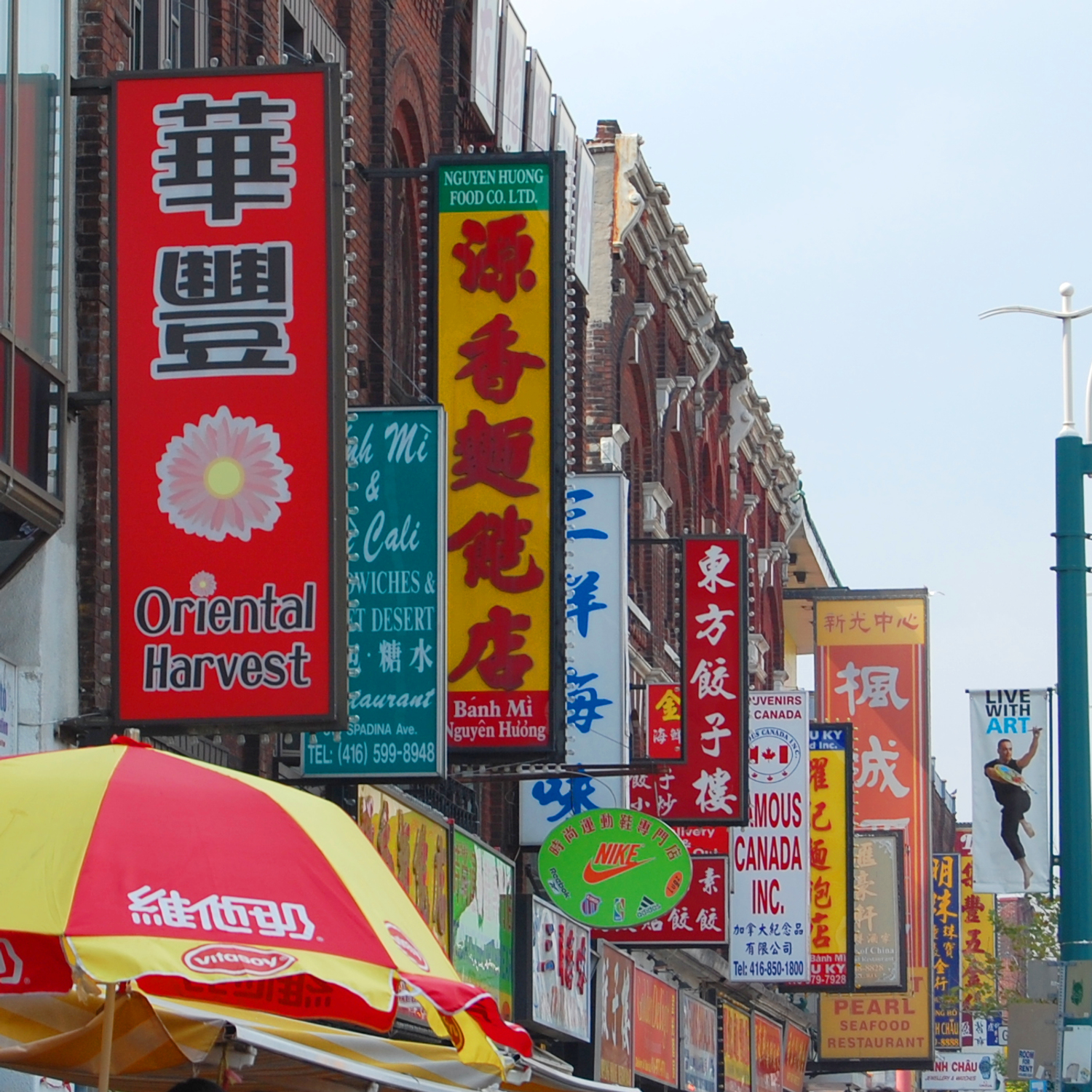
Signs in Toronto's Chinatown, one of a large collection of neighbourhoods in Canada featuring businesses that are run by, and often cater to, recent immigrants.

=== Government and social assistance ===
The government has a large department and a number of programs to try to ensure the well-being of immigrants to Canada, and ameliorate their economic condition. Immigration, Refugees and Citizenship Canada (IRCC) employs 5,000 staff, which on a per capita basis is 3 times more than the 15,000 U.S. Citizenship and Immigration Services employees. IRCC recoups some of its department costs through landing fees. In 2006, the Canadian government reduced the landing fee per immigrant by 50%. The Parliamentary Budget Officer has reported that irregular migration, from the initial entry into Canada to the final decision from the Immigration and Refugee Board and/or Federal Court, as well as any deportations, cost the federal government $340 million in 2017–18, and is projected to rise to $396 million in 2019–20.

New immigrants are also entitled to settlement assistance such as free language training under provincial government administered programs usually called Language Instruction for Newcomers to Canada (LINC), for which the federal government budgeted about $350 million to give to the provinces for the fiscal year 2006–2007. The majority of the $350 million was allocated to Quebec under the Canada-Quebec Accord, at $196 million per year, even though immigration to Quebec represented only 16.5% of all immigration to Canada in 2005. The $350 million is budgeted to increase by an additional $90 million by 2009. Provincial governments in Canada have established citizenship and immigration departments, such as Ontario's Ministry of Citizenship, Immigration and International Trade.

Support for immigrants was also one of the key issues that formed the basis of the New Deal for Cities between Toronto (and other urban centres), the Government of Ontario, and the Government of Canada, because 43% of new immigrants settle in the Greater Toronto Area resulting in certain challenges for that region. A paper published by Statistics Canada noted that "Over the 1990s (1990 to 2000) the city's low-income rate rose 1.9 percentage points. All of this increase was associated with deteriorating outcomes among immigrants, which tended to increase the city's low-income rate by 2.8 percentage points." In other words, the low-income rate among non-immigrants fell, but the income profile of new immigrants resulted in a net widening of the income inequality gap in Toronto during the 1990s.

The needs of immigrants prompted the United Way of Greater Toronto, the largest United Way charity in Canada, to identify immigration services in Toronto as a top priority for their $100 million 2006 campaign to combat poverty and social exclusion. In 2006, the Daily Bread Food Bank in Toronto reported that over 40% of its clients are foreign-born, and that almost half of that group had been in the country for less than 4 years. While the less than 4-year group shows far above average need, the over 40% figure is in line with the general population as 44% of Torontonians are foreign-born.

=== Government finances ===
There is no consensus on the net impact of immigration to government finances. A 1990 study found that an average immigrant household paid $22,528 in all forms of taxes and on average each household directly consumed $10,558 in government services. By contrast an average native Canadian household paid $20,259 in tax and consumed $10,102 in services. Across the country this means that immigrant households contributed $2.6 billion more than their share to the public purse. A 1996 study found that over a lifetime a typical immigrant family will pay some forty thousand dollars more to the treasury than they will consume in services. Explanations for this include that immigrant households tend to be larger, and have more wage earners, increasing taxes. Newcomers are also less likely to make use of many social services. Immigrants are less likely than native Canadians to receive employment insurance, social assistance, and subsidized housing. Immigrants are usually less prone to homelessness due to the support they receive from their families and communities. Recent immigrants are also less likely to make use of subsidized housing than native Canadians of the same income level. In 2004 22.5% of low-income native Canadians lived in subsidized housing, but only 20.4% of low income recent immigrants did so, though this number was considerably higher among more established immigrants. Results from a study from the Fraser Institute found that the immigrants who arrived between 1987 and 2004 cost governments $23 billion per annum (as of 2006) in excess of taxes raised from those immigrants, relating to universal social services (e.g., welfare, medicare, public education).

=== International trade ===
Organizations that facilitate Canada's international trade system include the Department of Foreign Affairs, Trade and Development (publicly known as Global Affairs Canada); the Trade Controls Bureau, which operates under the Minister of Foreign Affairs; the Canada Border Services Agency (CBSA); and the Canadian International Trade Tribunal, which is an independent quasi-judicial body.

The presence within Canada of people representative of many different cultures and nations has also been an important boost to Canada's international trade. Immigrants will often have the expertise, linguistic skills, personal connections with their country of origin that can help forge international trade ties. Studies have found that Canada does have greater trade relations with those nations that have provided large numbers of immigrants. Canada's economy is heavily centered on international trade, which accounted for 31.4% of GDP in 2017; although, most international trade is with the United States. In 2017, 76.4% of Canadian exports went to the United States.

This has been a common narrative about source countries of immigrants to Canada. For many years, expanded markets for trade has been a common rationale and justification for high immigration from the developing world. Data from Statistics Canada in 2017 reveals that the trade balances with developing countries from which Canada receives most of its immigrants ameliorates. As shown below, data from 2017 shows that only India has balanced trade with Canada.

Merchandise imports & exports between Canada and select developing countries, 2017 and 2019
Trading partner	Imports		Domestic exports	
Trading partner	2017	2019	2017	2019
India	$4.158 billion	$5.282 billion	$4.204 billion	$4.773 billion
Pakistan	$401.826 million	$449.525 million	$733.060 million	$663.463 million
Philippines	$1.392 billion	$1.604 billion	$811.073 million	$704.941 million
China	$70.926 billion	$75.012 billion	$21.845 billion	$22.379 billion
Iran	$88.482 million	$29.708 million	$125.955 million	$326.820 million
Syria	$1.179 million	$2,829 million	$22.520 million	$27.713 million

== See also ==
- Demographics of Canada
- Ethnic groups in Canada
- History of immigration to Canada
- Canada immigration statistics
- Annual immigration statistics of Canada
- Economy of Canada
- Economic results of migration
