= Višķi (disambiguation) =

Višķi may refer to:

- Višķi, a village in the Latgale region of Latvia
- Višķi Parish, an administrative unit of the Daugavpils Municipality, Latvia

== See also ==
- Viski (disambiguation)
