= Jean Augustine =

Canadian politician (born 1937)

The Honourable Jean Augustine PC CM OOnt CBE
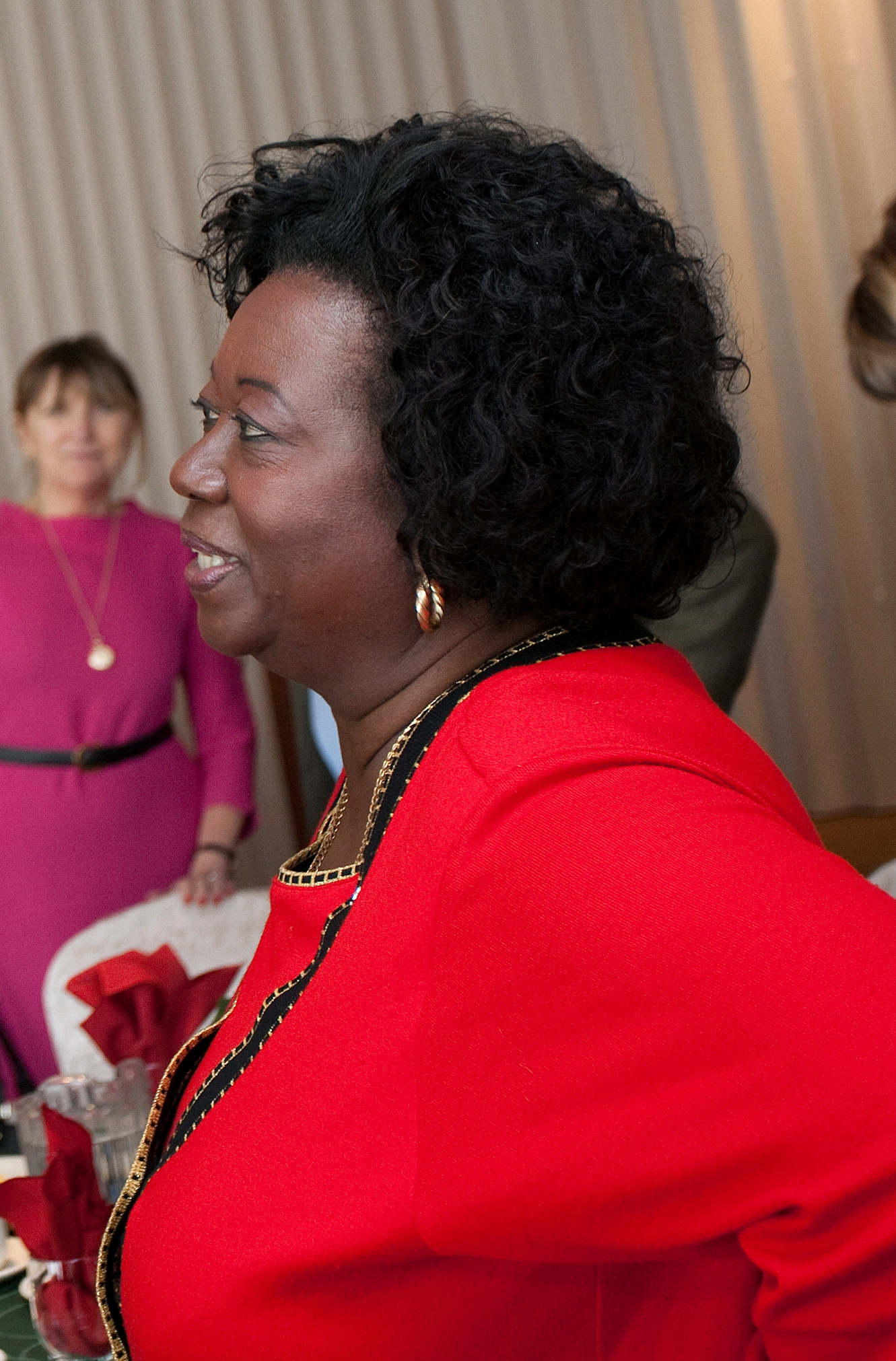

Minister of State for Multiculturalism and the Status of Women
- In office May 2, 2002 – July 31, 2004
- Prime Minister: Jean Chretien; Paul Martin
- Preceded by: Claudette Bradshaw
- Succeeded by: Raymond Chan

Fairness Commissioner of Ontario
- In office March 1, 2007 – March 20, 2015
- Premier: Dalton McGuinty; Kathleen Wynne
- Preceded by: Position established
- Succeeded by: Mary Shenstone

Parliamentary Secretary to the Prime Minister of Canada
- In office December 6, 1993 – February 22, 1996
- Prime Minister: Jean Chretien
- Preceded by: André Harvey
- Succeeded by: Rey Pagtakhan

Member of Parliament for Etobicoke—Lakeshore
- In office October 25, 1993 – January 23, 2006
- Preceded by: Patrick Boyer
- Succeeded by: Michael Ignatieff

Personal details
- Born: September 9, 1937 (age 89) St. George's, Grenada
- Party: Liberal
- Education: University of Toronto (BA, MEd)
- Profession: Educator, community organizer

Jean Augustine PC CM OOnt CBE (born September 9, 1937) is a Grenada-born Canadian politician. She was the first Black Canadian woman to serve as a federal Minister of the Crown and Member of Parliament.

Prior to entering politics in 1993, Jean Augustine had a career in education. She enrolled in Toronto Teachers’ College, graduating with an Ontario teaching certificate in 1963. She went on to work as a teacher in the Toronto Catholic District School Board, eventually becoming a school principal.

From 1993 to 2006, Jean Augustine was elected as the Liberal Party of Canada's member of the House of Commons of Canada for the riding (Federal Electoral District) of Etobicoke—Lakeshore in Toronto, Ontario. Ms. Augustine was the Parliamentary Secretary to Prime Minister Jean Chrétien from 1994 to 1996. She subsequently served as the Minister of State for Multiculturalism and the Status of Women in the Cabinet of Canada from 2002 to 2004.

Following her retirement from politics, she has served as the patron of several non-profit organizations across Canada. From 2007 to 2015, Ms. Augustine served as the first Fairness Commissioner of Ontario.

== Early life and education ==
Augustine was born on September 9, 1937, in St. George's, Grenada, and immigrated to Canada in 1960 under the West Indian Domestic Scheme, which ran from 1955 to 1966. She attended Toronto Teachers’ College before earning a Bachelor of Arts (1973) degree from Woodsworth College at the University of Toronto, and later, a Master of Education (1980), also from the University of Toronto while working as an elementary school teacher. Augustine was later promoted to principal, then Supervisory Officer.

In addition to her teaching career with the Catholic School board (Metropolitan Separate School Board) in Toronto, Augustine was also actively involved in Toronto's Caribbean community, sitting on the first committee to organize the Caribana Festival in 1967.

As a social activist, Augustine volunteered and worked with many social justice and educational organizations. They included service with the National Black Coalition of Canada, the Urban Alliance on Race Relations (UARR). She was appointed as chair of the Metro Toronto Housing Authority. She was also named national president of the Congress of Black Women of Canada in 1987.

Augustine served on various boards during this period, including York University's Board of Governors, The Hospital for Sick Children, the Stephen Lewis Foundation and Toronto's Harbourfront Corporation.

In 1988, Augustine was appointed as chair of the Metro Toronto Housing Authority, a multi-million dollar social housing authority serving 300,000 residents in rent-geared to income housing.

== Political career (1993–2005) ==
In 1993, Jean Augustine became the first Black Canadian woman elected to Canada’s House of Commons, as the Member of Parliament from the Greater Toronto Area constituency of Etobicoke-Lakeshore. She served as a Liberal Member of Parliament for four consecutive terms, being re-elected three times.

Augustine held many portfolios and positions during her time as an elected member of Canada's federal government, including as Parliamentary Secretary to the Prime Minister (Jean Chrétien); Minister of Multiculturalism and the Status of Women; Chair of the Foreign Affairs and International Trade committee; Chair of the Human Rights Committee, three-time Chair of the National Women’s Caucus. In 2004, she was elected Assistant Deputy Speaker by her fellow parliamentarians.

Augustine's parliamentarian achievements include legislation to protect disadvantaged low-income individuals including single mothers raising children; securing unanimous legislative support to pass a motion designating February as Black History Month in Canada; securing unanimous legislative support to pass a motion to erect the Famous Five Monument on Parliament Hill.

== Later life ==
In 2007, the Government of Ontario appointed Augustine as the first Fairness Commissioner, a position created to advocate for Canadians with foreign professional credentials. Augustine retired from the position in March 2015.

In 2007, Augustine donated her personal papers and memorabilia to the Clara Thomas Archives and Special Collections at York University. The collection is known as the Jean Augustine Fonds. "Pushing buttons, pushing stories" is a digital exhibit of Augustine's personal political buttons.

In 2008, the Jean Augustine Chair in Education in the New Urban Environment was established as an endowed chair at York University, with Prof. Nombuso Dlamini appointed the first chair (2010–15). The chair was renamed as the Jean Augustine Chair in Education, Community and Diaspora York University. In 2016, the present chair holder, Faculty of Education professor and Distinguished Research Professor, Carl E. James, was appointed for a five-year term, which was renewed. In 2023 the Jean Augustine Chair received funding from the federal government of Canada, making it a fully-funded endowed chair.

Augustine serves as the patron, visitor or honorary chair of a number of organizations, including the NATO Association of Canada.

== Personal life ==
In 1968, Augustine married Winston Augustine, but they subsequently divorced in 1981. They have two daughters. Augustine is Catholic.

== Selected Writing in Academic and Grey Literature ==
Augustine, J. (2021). Multiculturalism@ 50: the experience of Black Canadians. Canadian Issues Fall/Winter, 65-69.

Augustine, J. (2020). Being the Messenger and the Message. Canadian Issues, Fall/Winter, 27–30.

Augustine, H. J. (2015). Employment match rates in the regulated professions: trends and policy implications. Canadian Public Policy, 41(Supplement 1), S28–S47.

Augustine, J. (2007). A message from Dr, Jean Augustine, Chair, Ontario Bicentenary Commemorative Committee on the abolition of the slave trade. Ontario History, 99(1), IV.

== Honours and awards ==
- In 2022, a film that recapped Jean Augustine's life and achievements was premiered in Toronto and Ottawa with Prime Minister Justin Trudeau as special guest. The creative team behind the team includes documentary filmmakers Fahim Ali, Ali Umair and John Challinor III.
- In 2021, Augustine was given the Lifetime Achievement Award from Maclean's Magazine, as part of its 12th annual Parliamentarians of the Year awards.
- Augustine was awarded the Nelson Mandela Humanitarian award of 2018.
- In 2007, Augustine was awarded the Caribbean Luminary award from Grenada's university of west Indies.
- Augustine was awarded an Honorary Doctor of Laws from her alma mater, University of Toronto. In 2009, she was awarded an Honorary Doctor of Laws from McGill University. In 2017, she was awarded an Honorary Doctor of Laws from Trent University.
- She has received the YWCA Woman of Distinction Award, the Kay Livingstone Award, the Ontario Volunteer Award, an African Canadian Achievement Award (Pride News Magazine), the Rubena Willis Special Recognition Award, and the Toronto Lions' Club Onyx Award.
- In 2009, she was made a Member of the Order of Canada "for her distinguished career as an educator, politician and advocate for social justice in Canada".
- She was appointed Commander of the Order of the British Empire (CBE) in the 2014 Birthday Honours for services to education and politics in Grenada, from which she had emigrated 54 years previously.
- The Jean Augustine Scholarship Fund was named for her, which she helps support with fundraising. It assists single mothers to undertake post-secondary study at George Brown College.
- Jean Augustine Secondary School in Brampton, Ontario is named for her.
- Toronto District School Board (TDSB) Girls’ Leadership Academy.
- In 2011 Augustine was one of the Top 25 Canadian Immigrant Award winners.

== Electoral record ==
2004 Canadian federal election: Etobicoke—Lakeshore
Party	Candidate	Votes	%	±%
Liberal	Jean Augustine	24,909	50.2	▼1.5
Conservative	John Capobianco	15,159	30.6	▼10.0
New Democratic	Margaret Anne McHugh	7,179	14.4	▲7.9
Green	John Huculiak	2,201	4.4	
Marxist–Leninist	Janice Murray	129	0.2	0.0
Total valid votes		49,577	100.0	

Note: Conservative vote is compared to the total of the Canadian Alliance vote and Progressive Conservative vote in 2000 election.

2000 Canadian federal election: Etobicoke—Lakeshore
Party	Candidate	Votes	%	±%
Liberal	Jean Augustine	22,467	51.8	▲5.6
Alliance	David Court	9,160	21.1	▲2.1
Progressive Conservative	David Haslam	8,453	19.5	▼3.4
New Democratic	Richard Joseph Banigan	2,835	6.5	▼2.4
Natural Law	Don Jackson	244	0.6	▲0.3
Marxist–Leninist	Janice Murray	116	0.3	0.0
Communist	Ed Bil	113	0.3	
Total valid votes		43,388	100.0	

Note: Canadian Alliance vote is compared to the Reform vote in 1997 election.

1997 Canadian federal election: Etobicoke—Lakeshore
Party	Candidate	Votes	%	±%
Liberal	Jean Augustine	21,180	46.2	+4.1
Progressive Conservative	Charles Donley	10,509	22.9	-8.0
Reform	Robert Beard	8,697	19.0	+0.2
New Democratic	Karen Ridley	4,085	8.9	+3.9
Canadian Action	Paul Hellyer	770	1.7	
Green	David Burman	315	0.7	
Natural Law	Geraldine Jackson	139	0.3	-0.3
Marxist–Leninist	Barbara Seed	133	0.3	+0.1
Total valid votes		45,828	100.0	

1993 Canadian federal election: Etobicoke—Lakeshore
Party	Candidate	Votes	%	±%
Liberal	Jean Augustine	19,458	42.1	
Progressive Conservative	Patrick Boyer	14,306	31.0	-15.1
Reform	Ken Anstruther	8,693	18.8	
New Democratic	Karen Ridley	2,316	5.0	-39.2
National	Gilles Brunet	861	1.9	
Natural Law	Don Jackson	283	0.6	
Libertarian	Alan D'Orsay	197	0.4	-6.6
Marxist–Leninist	Julie Northrup	78	0.2	
Abolitionist	Michael McCabe	2	0.0	
Total valid votes		46,194	100.0	

27th Canadian Ministry (2003–2006) – Cabinet of Paul Martin
Cabinet post (1)
Predecessor	Office	Successor
	Minister of State (Multiculturalism and Status of Women); 2003–2004	
26th Canadian Ministry (1993–2003) – Cabinet of Jean Chrétien
Sub-Cabinet Post
Predecessor	Title	Successor
Hedy Fry	Secretary of State (Multiculturalism) (Status of Women) (2002–2003)	
