= Killam Prize =

Canada Council research award

The Killam Prize (previously the Izaak Walton Killam Memorial Prize) was established according to the will of Dorothy J. Killam to honour the memory of her husband Izaak Walton Killam.

Five Killam Prizes, each having a value of $100,000, were awarded annually by the Canada Council for the Arts to eminent Canadian researchers who distinguish themselves in the fields of social sciences, humanities, natural sciences, health sciences, or engineering.

In August 2021, the Canada Council announced it would transition the administration of the Killam program to the National Research Council Canada (NRC) by March 2022.

The restructured Killam Program was officially launched under the administration of the NRC in April 2022. It is now called the National Killam Program and consists of the Killam Prizes, the Dorothy Killam Fellowships and the Killam NRC Paul Corkum Fellowships.

== Recipients ==
Year	Winner	Affiliation	Field
1976	Harold Williams	Memorial University of Newfoundland	Natural Sciences
1978	Harold Williams	Memorial University of Newfoundland	Natural Sciences
1981	Feroze N. Ghadially	University of Saskatchewan	Health Sciences
1981	Raymond Lemieux	University of Alberta	Natural Sciences
1981	Louis Siminovitch	University of Toronto	Health Sciences
1982	William T. Tutte	University of Waterloo	Natural Sciences
1983	Brenda Milner	McGill University	Health Sciences
1984	Werner Israel	University of Alberta	Natural Sciences
1985	Pierre Dansereau	Université du Québec à Montréal	Natural Sciences
1985	Phil Gold	McGill University	Natural Sciences
1985	Ralph Gordon Stanton	University of Manitoba	Natural Sciences
1985	Raymond N. Yong	McGill University	Engineering
1986	Jacques Genest	Institut de recherches cliniques de Montréal/Université de Montréal	Health Sciences
1986	William H. Rapson	University of Toronto	Engineering
1986	Karel Wiesner	University of New Brunswick	Natural Sciences
1987	Ronald J. Gillespie	McMaster University	Natural Sciences
1987	J. Fraser Mustard	McMaster University	Health Sciences
1987	Ashok Vijh	Institut de recherche d'Hydro-Québec	Engineering
1988	Henry J. M. Barnett	University of Western Ontario	Health Sciences
1988	William-Henri Gauvin	McGill University	Engineering
1988	John C. Polanyi	University of Toronto	Natural Sciences
1989	J. Keith Brimacombe	University of British Columbia	Engineering
1989	Jules Hardy	Université de Montréal	Health Sciences
1989	J. Tuzo Wilson	University of Toronto	Natural Sciences
1990	J. William Costerton	University of Calgary	Natural Sciences
1990	M. Daria Haust	University of British Columbia	Health Sciences
1990	Sidney van den Bergh	Dominion Astrophysical Observatory	Natural Sciences
1991	Jacques de Champlain	Université de Montréal	Health Sciences
1991	Walter H. Dilger	University of Calgary	Engineering
1991	Gordon Dixon	University of Calgary	Health Sciences
1992	Henry A. Becker	Queen's University	Engineering
1992	Keith U. Ingold	National Research Council of Canada	Natural Sciences
1992	Emil Skamene	McGill University	Health Sciences
1993	Alan G. Davenport	University of Western Ontario	Engineering
1993	Peter W. Hochachka	University of British Columbia	Natural Sciences
1993	André Roch Lecours	McGill University	Health Sciences
1994	Adrian G. Brook	University of Toronto	Natural Sciences
1994	C. André T. Salama	University of Toronto	Engineering
1994	Endel Tulving	University of Toronto	Health Sciences
1995	Myer Bloom	University of British Columbia	Natural Sciences
1995	Michel Chrétien	Institut de recherches cliniques de Montréal/Université de Montréal	Health Sciences
1995	George D. Zames	McGill University	Engineering
1996	Philip Seeman	University of Toronto	Health Sciences
1996	William G. Unruh	University of British Columbia	Natural Sciences
1997	Stephen A. Cook	University of Toronto	Engineering
1997	Stephen Hanessian	Université de Montréal	Natural Sciences
1997	David H. MacLennan	University of Toronto	Health Sciences
1998	Fernand Labrie	Université Laval	Health Sciences
1998	Martha Salcudean	University of British Columbia	Engineering
1998	Juan C. Scaiano	University of Ottawa	Natural Sciences
1999	Albert J. Aguayo	Centre for Research in Neuroscience/McGill University	Health Sciences
1999	Maurice A. Bergougnou	University of Western Ontario	Engineering
1999	Walter N. Hardy	University of British Columbia	Natural Sciences
2000	Paul Brumer	University of Toronto	Natural Sciences
2000	Fergus I. M. Craik	University of Toronto	Natural Sciences
2000	John J. Jonas	McGill University	Engineering
2000	Anthony Pawson	Mount Sinai Hospital/University of Toronto	Health Sciences
2001	Werner Kalow	University of Toronto	Health Sciences
2001	Ronald Melzack	McGill University	Natural Sciences
2001	Norbert R. Morgenstern	University of Alberta	Engineering
2002	Harry Arthurs	Osgoode Law School/York University	Social Sciences
2002	Nicolas Georganas	University of Ottawa	Engineering
2002	Ian Hacking	University of Toronto	Humanities
2002	Robert V. Moody	University of Alberta	Natural Sciences
2002	Lap-Chee Tsui	Hospital for Sick Children/University of Toronto	Health Sciences
2003	Edward J. Davison	University of Toronto	Engineering
2003	Walter Erwin Diewert	University of British Columbia	Social Sciences
2003	François Duchesneau	Université de Montréal	Humanities
2003	Tak Mak	University of Toronto	Health Sciences
2003	David Schindler	University of Alberta	Natural Sciences
2004	James G. Arthur	University of Toronto	Natural Sciences
2004	Will Kymlicka	Queen's University	Social Sciences
2004	Jean-Jacques Nattiez	Université de Montréal	Humanities
2004	Janet Rossant	Samuel Lunenfeld Research Institute/Mount Sinai Hospital/University of Toronto	Health Sciences
2004	R. Kerry Rowe	Queen's University	Engineering
2005	Luc Devroye	McGill University	Engineering
2005	Brian K. Hall	Dalhousie University	Natural Sciences
2005	Linda Hutcheon	University of Toronto	Humanities
2005	Margaret Lock	McGill University	Social Sciences
2005	Nahum Sonenberg	McGill University	Health Sciences
2006	Paul Corkum	National Research Council of Canada	Natural Sciences
2006	Jean-Marie Dufour	Université de Montréal	Social Sciences
2006	Brett Finlay	University of British Columbia	Health Sciences
2006	Roderick I. L. Guthrie	McGill University	Engineering
2006	Susan Sherwin	Dalhousie University	Humanities
2007	J. Richard Bond	University of Toronto	Natural Sciences
2007	Robert E. W. Hancock	University of British Columbia	Health Sciences
2007	Roderick A. Macdonald	McGill University	Social Sciences
2007	Shana Poplack	University of Ottawa	Humanities
2007	A. P. S. Selvadurai	McGill University	Engineering
2008	Constance Backhouse	University of Ottawa	Social Sciences
2008	Sherrill E. Grace	University of British Columbia	Humanities
2008	Frank C. Hawthorne	University of Manitoba	Natural Sciences
2008	Michael V. Sefton	University of Toronto	Engineering
2008	Peter St George-Hyslop	University of Toronto	Health Sciences
2009	Philippe Gros	McGill University	Health Sciences
2009	Wagdi G. Habashi	McGill University	Engineering
2009	François Ricard	McGill University	Humanities
2009	John P. Smol	Queen's University	Natural Sciences
2009	Ernest Weinrib	University of Toronto	Social Sciences
2010	Ellen Bialystok	York University	Social Sciences
2010	Mark Henkelman	The Hospital for Sick Children	Health Sciences
2010	Ming Li	University of Waterloo	Engineering
2010	Arthur B. McDonald	Queen's University	Natural Sciences
2010	James H. Tully	University of Victoria	Humanities
2011	Gilles Brassard	Université de Montréal	Natural Sciences
2011	Michael R. Hayden	University of British Columbia	Health Sciences
2011	Keren Rice	University of Toronto	Humanities
2011	Lotfollah Shafai	University of Manitoba	Engineering
2011	Mark Zanna	University of Waterloo	Social Sciences
2012	Jean Grondin	Université de Montréal	Humanities
2012	Geoffrey Hinton	University of Toronto	Engineering
2012	Louis Taillefer	Université de Sherbrooke	Natural Sciences
2012	Mark Wainberg	Jewish General Hospital/McGill University	Health Sciences
2012	John Whalley	University of Western Ontario	Social Sciences
2013	Lorne Babiuk	University of Alberta	Health Sciences
2013	John McGarry	Queen's University	Social Sciences
2013	Witold Pedrycz	University of Alberta	Engineering
2013	W. Richard Peltier	University of Toronto	Natural Sciences
2013	Paul Thagard	University of Waterloo	Humanities
2014	Sajeev John	University of Toronto	Natural Sciences
2014	Andreas Mandelis	University of Toronto	Engineering
2014	James R. Miller	University of Saskatchewan	Humanities
2014	Frank Plummer	University of Manitoba	Health Sciences
2014	D. R. Fraser Taylor	Carleton University	Social Sciences
2015	David M. R. Bentley	Western University	Humanities
2015	Vijay K. Bhargava	University of British Columbia	Engineering
2015	Victoria M. Kaspi	McGill University	Natural Sciences
2015	Donald J. Savoie	Université de Moncton	Social Sciences
2015	D. Lorne Tyrrell	University of Alberta	Health Sciences
2016	Axel Becke	Dalhousie University	Natural Sciences
2016	Isabelle Daunais	McGill University	Humanities
2016	Elizabeth A. Edwards	University of Toronto	Engineering
2016	Steven A. Narod	University of Toronto	Health Sciences
2016	Daniel Trefler	University of Toronto	Social Sciences
2017	John Borrows	University of Victoria	Social Sciences
2017	W. Ford Doolittle	Dalhousie University	Natural Sciences
2017	Thomas Hurka	University of Toronto	Humanities
2017	Julio Montaner	University of British Columbia	Health Sciences
2017	Molly Shoichet	University of Toronto	Engineering
2018	André Gaudreault	University of Montreal	Humanities
2018	Vladimir Hachinski	Western University	Health Sciences
2018	Walter Herzog	University of Calgary	Engineering
2018	James Pinfold	University of Alberta	Natural Sciences
2018	Janet Werker	University of British Columbia	Social Sciences
2019	Lynne Viola	University of Toronto	Humanities
2019	Stephen W. Scherer	University of Toronto	Health Sciences
2019	Keith W. Hipel	University of Waterloo	Engineering
2019	Yoshua Bengio	Université de Montréal	Natural Sciences
2019	André Blais	Université de Montréal	Social Sciences
2020	Sarah Carter	University of Alberta	Humanities
2020	Alan Evans	McGill University	Health Sciences
2020	Edward H. Sargent	University of Toronto	Engineering
2020	Barbara Sherwood Lollar	University of Toronto	Natural Sciences
2020	Cecilia Benoit	University of Victoria	Social Sciences
2021	Stephen R. Gill	York University	Social Sciences
2021	Arthur Ripstein	University of Toronto	Humanities
2021	Michel Bouvier	Université de Montréal/Institute for Research in Immunology and Cancer (IRIC)	Health Sciences
2021	Gilbert Laporte	HEC Montreal	Engineering
2021	Douglas Stephan	University of Toronto	Natural Sciences
2022	Françoise Baylis	Dalhousie University	Humanities
2022	Jeff Dahn	Dalhousie University	Engineering
2022	Carl E. James	York University	Social Sciences
2022	Geoffrey Ozin	University of Toronto	Natural Sciences
2022	Salim Yusuf	McMaster University	Health Sciences
2023	Ajay Heble	University of Guelph	Humanities
2023	Praveen Jain	Queen's University	Engineering
2023	Charles M. Morin	Université Laval	Social Sciences
2023	Sarah Otto	University of British Columbia	Natural Sciences
2023	Pieter Cullis	University of British Columbia	Health Sciences
2024	Janine Marchessault	York University	Humanities
2024	Clément Gosselin	Université Laval	Engineering
2024	Tania Li	University of Toronto	Social Sciences
2024	Gerard Wright	McMaster University	Health Sciences
2024	Sylvain Moineau	Université Laval	Natural Sciences
2025	René Doyon	Université de Montréal	Natural Sciences
2025	David Dyzenhaus	University of Toronto	Social Sciences
2025	Marco Marra	University of British Columbia	Health Sciences
2025	Christina Sharpe	York University	Humanities
2025	Peter Zandstra	University of British Columbia Engineering	

== See also ==
- List of medicine awards
- List of social sciences awards
