= Paul Brumer =

Professor of chemical physics

Paul W. Brumer
- Born: Paul William Brumer
- Education: Brooklyn College (BSc); Harvard University (PhD)
- Scientific career
- Fields: Chemistry
- Workplaces: University of Toronto
- Thesis: Structure and Collision Complex Dynamics of Alkali Halide Dimers (1972)
- Doctoral advisor: Martin Karplus
- Website: www.chemistry.utoronto.ca/people/directories/all-faculty/paul-brumer

Paul Brumer is a professor of chemistry at the University of Toronto, known for his work in theoretical chemical physics.

== Early life and education ==
Brumer was born in the New York borough of Brooklyn. He graduated from Brooklyn College with a bachelor's degree in 1966. In 1972 he received a doctorate from Harvard University under the supervision of Martin Karplus. As a postdoctoral fellow, he worked with Raphael Levine and Alexander Dalgarno at the Harvard Center for Astrophysics, where he lectured on astronomy.

== Career ==
In 1975 he moved to the department of chemistry at the University of Toronto. In his early scientific work, Brumer dealt with different aspects of the classical and quantum mechanical description of the dynamics of chemical reactions. In addition to linking classic chaotic dynamics and statistical behavior in chemical reactions, he used theoretical methods to investigate the occurrence of quantum chaos with such reactions. He published his most widely cited work with Moshe Shapiro and co-workers on the theory of laser control of chemical reactions, also known as coherent control of chemical reactions.

== Honors and awards ==
In 1993 Brumer became an elected fellow of the American Physical Society for "the development of quantum and classical dynamics of isolated molecules and the coherent control of chemical reactions." He was elected a fellow of the Royal Society of Canada in 1994. He received the Izaak Walton Killam Memorial Prize in 2000 for his work in chemical physics.

== Selected publications ==
Textbooks

- Shapiro, Moshe; Brumer, Paul (2003). Principles of the Quantum Control of Molecular Processes. Wiley-Interscience. Bibcode:2003pqcm.book.....S. ISBN 978-0-471-24184-3. OCLC 1024169461.
- Shapiro, Moshe; Brumer, Paul (2012). Quantum Control of Molecular Processes (2 ed.). John Wiley & Sons. ISBN 978-3-527-40904-4. OCLC 1042141617.

Articles

- Brumer, P.; Karplus, M. (1973). "Perturbation theory and ionic models for alkali halide systems. I Diatomics". The Journal of Chemical Physics. 58 (9): 3903–3918. Bibcode:1973JChPh..58.3903B. doi:10.1063/1.1679747.
- Jaffé, Charles; Brumer, Paul (1980). "Local and normal modes: A classical perspective". The Journal of Chemical Physics. 73 (11): 5646–5658. Bibcode:1980JChPh..73.5646J. doi:10.1063/1.440041.
- Shapiro, Moshe; Brumer, Paul (1986). "Laser control of product quantum state populations in unimolecular reactions". The Journal of Chemical Physics. 84 (7): 4103–4104. Bibcode:1986JChPh..84.4103S. doi:10.1063/1.450074.
- Brumer, Paul; Shapiro, Moshe (1986). "Control of unimolecular reactions using coherent light". Chemical Physics Letters. 126 (6): 541–546. Bibcode:1986CPL...126..541B. doi:10.1016/S0009-2614(86)80171-3.
- Brumer, Paul; Shapiro, Moshe (1989). "Coherence chemistry: controlling chemical reactions [with lasers]". Accounts of Chemical Research. 22 (12): 407–413. doi:10.1021/ar00168a001.
- Brumer, Paul; Shapiro, Moshe (1992). "Laser Control of Molecular Processes". Annual Review of Physical Chemistry. 43 (1): 257–282. Bibcode:1992ARPC...43..257B. doi:10.1146/annurev.pc.43.100192.001353. PMID 18397166.
- Shapiro, Moshe; Brumer, Paul (2003). "Coherent control of molecular dynamics". Reports on Progress in Physics. 66 (6): 859–942. Bibcode:2003RPPh...66..859S. doi:10.1088/0034-4885/66/6/201. S2CID 250889605.
- Collini, Elisabetta; Wong, Cathy Y.; Wilk, Krystyna E.; Curmi, Paul M. G.; Brumer, Paul; Scholes, Gregory D. (2010). "Coherently wired light-harvesting in photosynthetic marine algae at ambient temperature". Nature. 463 (7281): 644–647. Bibcode:2010Natur.463..644C. doi:10.1038/nature08811. PMID 20130647. S2CID 4369439.
