= Eliezer Palchinsky =

Latvian rabbi

Rabbi Eliezer Palchinsky אליעזר פלצינסקי

Personal life
- Born: Eliezer Manoach Palchinsky; November 18, 1912 Vishki, Latvia
- Died: October 6, 2007 (aged 94) Jerusalem, Israel
- Spouse: Ettel Levine
- Children: Shlomo; 6 daughters
- Parent: Rabbi Shlomo Yehuda Leib Palchinsky
- Education: Yeshivas Knesses Yisrael (Slabodka); Mir yeshiva (Belarus)

Religious life
- Religion: Judaism
- Yeshiva: Yeshivas Beis Aryeh
- Position: Rosh yeshiva
- Began: 1948
- Ended: 2007

Eliezer Manoach Palchinsky (Hebrew: אליעזר מנוח פלצינסקי; November 18, 1912 – October 6, 2007), also spelled Paltzinsky, Platchinsky and Platinsky, was a rosh yeshiva in Jerusalem for nearly 60 years.

== Biography ==
He was born on 28 Cheshvan 5673 (November 18, 1912) in the town of Vishki, Vitebsk Governorate, at the time in the Russian Empire, today in Latvia. His father, Rabbi Shlomo Yehuda Leib Palchinsky, was the av beis din (head of the rabbinical court) of Vishki. Palchinsky's maternal grandfather was Rabbi Nosson Tzvi Finkel (the Alter of Slabodka).

At age 10 Palchinsky traveled to Riga, where he learned under Rabbi Menachem Mendel Zaks, the rabbi of that city, for a year. At age 11 he returned home to study with his father until his bar mitzvah. During his teens, he learned for three years at Yeshivas Knesses Yisrael in Slabodka, Lithuania. During this period, Rabbi Meir Simcha (the Ohr Somayach), rabbi of Dvinsk, died and Palchinsky's father succeeded him in the city's rabbinate. Palchinsky would spend every Pesach break in Dvinsk, where he maintained a regular study session with Joseph Rosen. His close relationship with Rosen continued for 10 years, until the latter's death.

Palchinsky went on to study for a year and half in Riga under Rabbi Mordechai Pogramsky, and four years at the Mir yeshiva in Poland. In 1937, he was selected by the rosh yeshiva, Rabbi Eliezer Yehuda Finkel, to join an elite group of Mir students sent to learn under Yitzchok Zev Soloveitchik in Brisk. This group included Rabbi Aryeh Leib Malin and Soloveitchik's future son-in-law, Rabbi Yechiel Michel Feinstein. Palchinsky became a protégé of Soloveitchik, a relationship which continued when the two arrived in Jerusalem. Afterwards Palchinsky returned to the Slabodka yeshiva.

Palchinsky survived the Holocaust through the efforts of Rabbi Mordecai Dubin, an Agudath Israel activist. He immigrated to Mandatory Palestine in 1940. In the early 1940s he studied together with other scholars such as rabbis Shneur Kotler, Chaim Kreiswirth, and Elazar Goldschmidt.

In 1944 he married Ettel, the daughter of Rabbi Aryeh Levin, a prominent figure in the Old Yishuv in Jerusalem. This made him a brother-in-law to Rabbi Yosef Shalom Elyashiv. He and his wife had six daughters and one son.

In the mid-1940s, Palchinsky undertook a correspondence of over 80 letters with the Chazon Ish of Bnei Brak. In 1946, his uncle, Rabbi Issac Sher, called on him to re-establish the Slabodka Yeshiva in Bnei Brak. In 1948, he joined the staff of Yeshivas Beis Aryeh, founded by his father-in-law, Rabbi Aryeh Levin, in Jerusalem. Levin asked that Palchinsky be appointed rosh yeshiva. In addition to teaching in the yeshiva, Palchinsky delivered mussar (ethics) talks to students from Hebron Yeshiva and Mir Yeshiva. These students included Rabbi Aviezer Piltz, Rabbi Baruch Mordechai Ezrachi, Rabbi Mattisyahu Solomon, Rabbi Nosson Tzvi Finkel, Rabbi Chaim Sarna, and Rabbi Moshe Shapiro. During the 1948 War of Independence, Palchinsky delivered shiurim at Yeshivas Heichal HaTalmud in Tel Aviv.

In the 1960s and 1970s, Palchinsky also served as rosh yeshiva of the Tomchei Temimim system in Kfar Chabad and Lod. In 1972 he was asked to deliver a shiur klali (general lecture) in Yeshivas HaNegev and its kollel. Palchinsky established Kollel Shalom Yehuda in Kiryat Sanz, Jerusalem, in memory of his father.

He died on October 6, 2007, at the age of 94. He was buried on the Mount of Olives.

== Works ==
Palchinsky published two Talmudic works, one on Seder Nashim and one on Seder Moed, each entitled Shalom Yehuda (Hebrew: שְׁלום יהודה) in memory of his father. He also left unpublished writings.

- שלום יהודה: חידושים וביאורים לסדר מועד וביחוד למס' שבת עירובין וסוכה [Shalom Yehuda: Novellae and Explanations on Seder Moed – In Particular, Tractates Shabbat, Eiruvin, and Sukkah] (in Hebrew). Jerusalem. 1962.
- שלום יהודה: חידושים וביאורים לסדר מועד ביחוד מס' יבמות נדרים גיטין קידושין [Shalom Yehuda: Novellae and Explanations on Seder Nashim – In Particular, Tractates Yevamos, Nedarim, Gittin, Kiddushin] (in Hebrew). Jerusalem: Machon Beis Aryeh. 1983.
