= Shoichet =

Shoichet is a surname and an alternate written form of Shochet. Notable people with the surname include:

- Molly Shoichet, Canadian chemist who was the Province of Ontario's First Chief Scientist
- Rebecca Shoichet (born 1975), Canadian voice actress and singer
