= Carl E. James =

Canadian sociologist

- Born: 1952 (age 73–74); Antigua
- Occupation: sociologist
- Awards: FRSC

Academic background
- Education: York University
- Thesis: The Challenge of Making It: Youth's Career Aspirations and Perceptions of Their Chances to Achieve (1987)

Academic work
- Discipline: Sociology

Carl E. James FRSC (born 1952) is an Antiguan-born Canadian sociologist and professor of education at York University in Toronto, Canada, where he holds the Jean Augustine Chair in Education, Community & Diaspora.

James' research focuses on the sociology of education, student athletes, and "the intersections of race, ethnicity, culture, language, and identity in the Canadian context."

Among his honours, James was made a Fellow of the Royal Society of Canada in 2012 and in 2022 won the Killam Prize for Social Sciences. In 2024, he was one of eleven Black Torontonians selected by the Toronto Transit Commission to have portraits put up through the system during Black History Month.

== Awards and honours ==
- D. Litt., Honorary Degree from McGill University (2024)
- Distinguished Research Professor, York University (2023)
- Killam Prize for Social Sciences, Canada (2022)
- Fellow of the Royal Society of Canada (2012)
- Honorary Doctorate from the Faculty of Educational Sciences, Uppsala University (2006)

== Selected works ==
- James, Carl E. (1992). Making It: Black Youth, Racism and Career Aspirations in a Big City. Mosaic.
- James, Carl E. (1995). Seeing Ourselves: Exploring Race, Ethnicity and Culture. (and several revised editions)
- James, Carl E. (2005). Race in Play: Understanding the Socio-Cultural Worlds of Student Athletes. Canadian Scholars' Press. ISBN 978-1-55130-273-7.
- James, Carl E.; Davis, Andrea (2012). Jamaica in the Canadian Experience: A Multiculturalizing Presence. Fernwood. ISBN 978-1-55266-535-0.
- Henry, Frances; Dua, Enaksh; James, Carl E.; Kobayashi, Audrey; Li, Peter; Ramos, Howard; Smith, Malinda S. (2017). The Equity Myth: Racialization and Indigeneity at Canadian Universities. University of British Columbia Press.
- James, Carl E. (August 2020). "Who Gets to "Commit Sociology" and to Serve Whose Interest?". Canadian Review of Sociology/Revue Canadienne de Sociologie. 57 (3): 487–490. doi:10.1111/cars.12301. ISSN 1755-6171. PMID 32779339. S2CID 221101293.
- James, Carl E. (2021). "Colour Matters": Essays on the Experiences, Education and Pursuits of Black Youth. University of Toronto Press.
- James, Carl E.; Taylor, Leanne E. (2022). First-Generation Student Experiences in Higher Education: Counterstories. Routledge.
