= Viski =

Viski may refer to:

- Erzsébet Viski, Hungarian sprint canoer
- János Viski, Hungarian composer, pianist and teacher
- Dve Viski, rural locality in Pokhodsky Rural Okrug of Nizhnekolymsky District in the Sakha Republic, Russia

== See also ==
- Višķi (disambiguation)
