= Tania Li =

Anthropologist

Tania Li OC
- Education: King's College, Cambridge (BA, PhD)
- Scientific career
- Thesis: Cultural and economic change in the Singapore Malay community (1986)

Tania Murray Li (née Murray) is a Professor Emerita of Anthropology at the University of Toronto who is known for her work on labour, capitalism, development, politics and indigeneity with a particular focus on Indonesia. She is an elected member of the Royal Society of Canada, and an Officer of the Order of Canada.

== Education and career ==
Li has a B.A. (1981) and a Ph.D. (1987) from the University of Cambridge, where she studied at King's College. After her Ph.D., Li moved to Dalhousie University where she initially worked on a development project in Indonesia. After post-Doctoral research on Indonesia, Li began teaching at Dalhousie University in 1992, and in 2002 was appointed professor in the Department of Sociology and Social Anthropology. In 2004 she moved to the University of Toronto as Professor in the Department of Anthropology. From 2004 - 2018, Li was Canada Research Chair (Tier 1) in the Cultural and Political Economy of Asia.. In 2024, Professor Li was appointed the Yusof Ishak Professor of Social Sciences in the Department of Malay Studies at the National University of Singapore, and concurrently Professor Emerita in the Department of Anthropology at the University of Toronto.

She was appointed to the Order of Canada in 2024, with the rank of Officer.

== Research ==
Li's early research centered on Singapore where she worked on urban politics and the Malay community. From 1986 until 1989 Li worked on an environmental management project at Dalhousie University, and in a 2017 interview she described how the goals of "knowledge transfer and institution-building" made her uncomfortable.

Subsequently she worked on issues within Indonesia, particularly on the changing histories and identities of upland people as they relate in new ways to the natural resource base, to markets and to the state. Still using Indonesia as the basis for her research, she wrote a critique of the international development enterprise, and subsequently focused on land as the key resource governing capitalist relations among Indonesia's highland cacao farmers. Her most recent work has examined the social displacement resulting from the oil plantation boom in Indonesia.

== Selected publications ==
- Li, Tania Murray (1989). Malays in Singapore: Culture, Economy and Ideology. Oxford University Press. ISBN 978-0195889147.
- Li, Tania (1999). Transforming the Indonesian uplands : marginality, power, and production. Singapore: Harwood Academic Publishers. ISBN 981-230-045-7. OCLC 44613347.
- Li, Tania Murray (2000). "Articulating Indigenous Identity in Indonesia: Resource Politics and the Tribal Slot". Comparative Studies in Society and History. 42 (1): 149–179. doi:10.1017/S0010417500002632. hdl:1807/67593. ISSN 1475-2999. S2CID 55196506.
- Li, Tania Murray (16 May 2007). The Will to Improve: Governmentality, Development, and the Practice of Politics. Duke University Press. ISBN 978-0-8223-8978-1.
- Li, Tania Murray (1 March 2011). "Centering labor in the land grab debate". The Journal of Peasant Studies. 38 (2): 281–298. doi:10.1080/03066150.2011.559009. hdl:1807/67583. ISSN 0306-6150. S2CID 153371124.
- Li, Tania Murray (2014). Land's End: Capitalist Relations on an Indigenous Frontier. Duke University Press. ISBN 978-0-8223-5694-3. JSTOR j.ctv1131b52.
- Hall, Derek; Hirsch, Philip; Li, Tania (2011). Powers of exclusion : land dilemmas in Southeast Asia. Honolulu: University of Hawaiʻi Press. ISBN 978-0-8248-3603-0. OCLC 699009457.
- Li, Tania Murray; Semedi, Pujo (2021). Plantation Life: Corporate Occupation in Indonesia's Oil Palm Zone. Duke University Press. ISBN 978-1478014959.

== Awards and honors ==
In 2015 she was named a fellow of the Royal Society of Canada. Li's book Land's End won the Senior Book Prize from the American Ethnological Association in 2016, and the George McT. Kahin Prize from the Association for Asian Studies in 2017. In 2018 she was the winner of the SSHRC Impact Award (Insight category). In 2019 she was named a fellow of the Royal Anthropological Institute, and in 2022 she received the Ester Boserup Prize for Research on Development (Denmark). In 2024, Tania Li was awarded the Killam Prize for Social Sciences, and was made an Officer of the Order of Canada.
