= M. Daria Haust =

Polish-Canadian pathologist

Maria Daria Haust OC FRCPC (née Jaworska; August 18, 1921 – January 11, 2022) was a Polish-Canadian pathologist, medical researcher, and pioneer of the speciality paediatric pathology. She was the first president, from 1983 to 1986, of the Canadian Atherosclerosis Society.

== Biography ==
Maria Daria Jaworska was born in a small village in Poland. She completed her primary and secondary education in Poland before WW II. In 1945 the part of Poland where she grew up was incorporated into the Soviet Union. In 1951, Jaworska graduated from the Heidelberg University School of Medicine and shortly after her graduation married Heinz Leonhard Haust (1919–2023). In addition to her native Polish, she spoke German, French, and English. In 1952, she and her husband immigrated to Canada. In 1953, she completed her medical internship at Kingston General Hospital. After completing her internship, she stayed at home to take care of the Haust's two infant boys, William and Jan, both of whom were born at Kingston General Hospital. In 1955 at Queen's University at Kingston (affiliated with Kingston General Hospital), she became a research fellow investigating atherosclerosis under the supervision of Robert H. More. After one year as a research fellow, she enrolled in the General Pathology Residency and Graduate School programs at Queen's University. In 1959 she obtained an MSc (Med) degree from Queen's University and in November of that year she qualified as a specialist in General Pathology in the Royal College of Physicians and Surgeons of Canada. She held a postdoctoral fellowship in paediatric pathology under the supervision of Benjamin Harrison Landing (1920–2000) at the Cincinnati Children's Hospital.

Haust was, from 1960 to 1967, an assistant professor and was promoted in 1967 to associate professor at Queen's University at Kingston. However, in 1967 the Haust family moved to London, Ontario. There, she joined the faculty of the University of Western Ontario and was promoted to full professor of pathology in 1968, eventually retiring as professor emerita. At the University of Western Ontario, her husband was also a faculty member and was the medical director of the Children's Psychiatric Research Institute . (now called the Child and Parent Resource Institute). She became the director of pathology at the Children's Psychiatric Research Institute.

In May 2002, Haust returned for six weeks to the department of pathology of Queen's University of Kingston to continue her work on departmental history, archives, and editorial matters. Since 1995, with the exception of one year, her visits to Queen's department of pathology became an annual event.

She garnered an international reputation from numerous invited lectures, service on the editorial board of 10 scientific journals, and the authorship or co-authorship of more than 200 publications, She did important basic research in several areas including atherosclerosis, elastogenesis, and the pathogenesis of several genetic diseases.

According to the French pathologist Christian Nezelof,

Under her influence, pediatric pathology became a discipline in its own right and became recognized as such in many foreign countries where it had hitherto been neglected or even ignored.

Daria Haust received many national and international awards and honours. In 1972 Daria Haust was elected a Fellow of the Royal College of Physicians and Surgeons of Canada. In 1990, she was awarded the Killam Prize in Medicine. She received honorary doctorate of medicine degrees in 1996 from the Jagiellonian University of Krakow and, in 1998, from both Charles University in Prague and the University of Havana. The Department of Pathology and Molecular Medicine of Queen's University at Kingston School of Medicine hosts the M. Daria Haust Lecture Series. Kurt Benirschke on the 1st and 2 October 2001 gave the inaugural M. Daria Haust Lecture entitled Challenges of the Pathology of Twinning. In 2002, two issues of the journal Pediatric Pathology and Molecular Medicine, dedicated to her as a festschrift, consist of 14 contributions by scientists from many different countries. She was appointed in 2007 an Officer of the Order of Canada. She received in 2012 the Queen Elizabeth II Diamond Jubilee Medal from the Governor General of Canada.

Upon her death in Toronto at age 100 in 2022, Haust was survived by her husband, their two sons, four grandsons, and three great-grandchildren.

== Selected publications ==
- Movat HZ; More RH; Haust MD (December 1958). "The diffuse intimal thickening of the human aorta with aging". The American Journal of Pathology. 34 (6): 1023–1031. PMC 1934788. PMID 13583094.
- Movat HZ; More RH; Haust MD (February 1959). "The morphologic elements in the early lesions of arteriosclerosis". The American Journal of Pathology. 35 (1): 93–101. PMC 1934803. PMID 13617412.
- Haust MD; More RH; Movat HZ (October 1960). "The role of smooth muscle cells in the fibrogenesis of arteriosclerosis". The American Journal of Pathology. 37 (4): 377–389. PMC 1942258. PMID 13712348.
- Balis, John U.; Haust, M. Daria; More, Robert H. (1964). "Electron-microscopic studies in human atherosclerosis cellular elements in aortic fatty streaks". Experimental and Molecular Pathology. 3 (5): 511–525. doi:10.1016/0014-4800(64)90031-0. PMID 14225069.
- Haust, M.Daria; More, Robert H.; Bencosme, S.A.; Balis, John U. (1965). "Elastogenesis in human aorta: An electron microscopic study". Experimental and Molecular Pathology. 4 (5): 508–524. doi:10.1016/0014-4800(65)90015-8. PMID 5847769.
- Cooperman E; Marshall KG; Haust MD (December 2, 1967). "Congenital astrocytoma". Can Med Assoc J. 97 (23): 1405–1407. PMC 1923601. PMID 6060845.
- Gatfield PD; Taller E; Hinton GG; Wallace AC; Abdelnour GM; Haust MD (December 28, 1968). "Hyperpipecolatemia: A new metabolic disorder associated with neuropathy and hepatomegaly: A case study". Can Med Assoc J. 99 (25): 1215–1233. PMC 1945626. PMID 5700850.
- Haust, M. Daria (1971). "The morphogenesis and fate of potential and early atherosclerotic lesions in man". Human Pathology. 2 (1): 1–29. doi:10.1016/S0046-8177(71)80019-9. PMID 4937772.
- Haust, M. D. (1987). "Arterial involvement in genetic diseases". The American Journal of Cardiovascular Pathology. 1 (2): 231–285. PMID 3333142.
- Clarson, Cheril; Tevaarwerk, Gerald J.M.; Harding, Paul G.R.; Chance, Graham W.; Haust, M. Daria (1989). "Placental weight in diabetic pregnancies". Placenta. 10 (3): 275–281. doi:10.1016/0143-4004(89)90028-3. PMID 2771897.
- Haust, M. Daria (1990). "The Genesis of Atherosclerosis in Pediatric Age-Group". Pediatric Pathology. 10 (1–2): 253–271. doi:10.3109/15513819009067112. PMID 2179919.
- Goyer, R.A.; Haust, M.D.; Cherian, M.G. (1992). "Cellular localization of metallothionein in human term placenta". Placenta. 13 (4): 349–355. doi:10.1016/0143-4004(92)90059-3. PMID 1438083.
