= Daniel Trefler =

Canadian economist (born 1959)

- Born: 1959 (age 66–67); Toronto, Ontario, Canada

Academic background
- Education: University of California, Los Angeles (Ph.D.); Cambridge University (M.Phil.); University of Toronto (B.A.)

Academic work
- Discipline: International economics Technology, productivity, competitiveness
- Institutions: Rotman School of Management; University of Toronto
- Awards: Killam Prize, Canada Research Chair, Bank of Canada Fellowship Award, Harry Johnson Prize, John Rae Prize, Noni MacDonald Award, Ohlin Lecture, Innis Lecture
- Website: Information at IDEAS / RePEc

Daniel Trefler (born 1959) is a Canadian economist who is currently the J. Douglas and Ruth Grant Chair in Competitiveness and Prosperity at the Rotman School of Management, University of Toronto. He is among the most influential and frequently cited economists worldwide.

== Background ==
Born and raised in Toronto, Trefler graduated from the University of Toronto in 1982 with a B.A. in economics and mathematics. He then attended Cambridge University and UCLA, receiving his M.Phil. from the former (1983) and Ph.D. from the latter (1989). Starting that year, he worked at the University of Toronto's Department of Economics. He spent the two years from 1994 to 1996 at the University of Chicago, before deciding to return home permanently to Toronto to serve as a professor at the Rotman School in the University of Toronto. In 2004, he was awarded the prestigious Canada Research Chair.

== Career ==
Trefler's work has provided academics, policymakers, and business leaders with invaluable observations on economic issues facing Canada and nations worldwide. Some of his most recognized academic contributions include his "case of the missing trade", the impact of exporting on firm productivity, and the relationship between a country's income and the products it exports. His studies have brought deep insights into how international trade can fundamentally alter societal institutions: for example, how changes in the relative power of special interest groups can impact innovation, constitutional arrangements, worker rights, and the distribution of wealth. Currently, he has been studying the impact of artificial intelligence on trade.

Trefler is renowned for his ground-breaking contributions to public policy formation in Canada, and he has been given full scope to pursue his many policy initiatives, including in the Ontario Task Force on Competitiveness, Productivity and Economic Progress, as well as in Global Affairs Canada. His research has been instrumental in the design of trade agreements that promote productivity, innovation, and investment while minimizing harmful effects on workers. In recent years, he helped frame the document that launched the Canada-EU trade agreement.

In Canada, Trefler is a Senior Research Fellow at the Canadian Institute for Advanced Studies, a research fellow at the C.D. Howe Institute, an advisor to the Institute for Competitiveness and Prosperity, and served as a member of the academic advisory board in the Department of Foreign Affairs and International Trade. Internationally, he is a research fellow at the National Bureau of Economic Research and the Centre for Policy Research. He gives public lectures and seminars across the world, including at Harvard, Princeton, MIT, Stanford, Chicago, Yale, LSE and Peking University. He makes frequent media appearances within Canada and abroad, including a term as an invited columnist at The Globe and Mail.

Trefler was a long-standing co-editor at the Journal of International Economics, the top-ranked journal in his field, and served on the Editorial Board of the American Economic Association's Journal of Economic Literature. He has received all three major awards of the Canadian Economics Association: the Harry Johnson Prize, John Rae Prize, and the Innis Lecture, the latter of which is awarded in recognition of contributions to economics in the broadest sense. He was awarded Canada's Killam Prize in 2016. Dubbed Canada's Nobel, the Killam Prize is awarded annually to "academic titans" for "pushing the boundaries of their fields" His advocacy on behalf of children earned him the Noni MacDonald Award from the Canadian Paediatric Society. He is the recipient of the Bank of Canada Fellowship Award and was the 2011 Ohlin Lecture, the most internationally celebrated lecture in his core field of international economics.

== Selected Articles for a General Audience ==
- "The Politics of Inequality." Rotman Magazine. Fall 2017, pages 94–97.
- "Canada Should Lead Development of Clean, Renewable Energy." Globe & Mail. June 22, 2015. With Alan Bernstein and Ted Sargent.
- "Canada: Oiled by Tar or Tarred by Oil." OpenCanada.org. April 7, 2014.
- "The One Percent in History." Rotman Magazine. Fall 2013, pages 93–96.
- "Loonacy of Parity: How a Strong Dollar Weakens Canada." Globe & Mail. October 16, 2010, F9.
- "A Time and Place for Free Trade." Harvard College Economic Review, volume II, issue 2. Spring 2008.
- "Think Globally, Invest Locally: Responding to the Rise of Offshoring." Rotman Magazine. Fall 2005, pages 42–45.
- "Treating Children Well Strengthens a Nation." The Ottawa Citizen. September 4, 2004.
- "Looking Back: How Childhood Experiences Impact a Nation’s Wealth." Rotman Magazine. Spring/Summer 2004.

== See also ==
- Rotman School of Management
- Canadian Institute for Advanced Research
- Journal of International Economics
- Journal of Economic Literature
- Canadian Economics Association
- Izaak-Walton-Killam Award
