= Ellen Bialystok =

Canadian psychologist

Ellen Bialystok OC, FRSC
- Born: 1948 (age 77–78)
- Spouse: Franklin Bialystok
- Awards: Killam Prize

Academic background
- Education: University of Toronto

Academic work
- Discipline: Psychology
- Institutions: York University
- Main interests: Bilingualism; Cognitive development

Ellen Bialystok, OC, FRSC (born 1948) is a Canadian psychologist and professor. She carries the rank of Distinguished Research Professor at York University in Toronto, Ontario where she is director of the Lifespan Cognition and Development Lab. She is also an associate scientist at the Rotman Research Institute of the Baycrest Centre for Geriatric Care.

She received her Ph.D. from the University of Toronto in 1976 with a specialization in cognitive and language development in children.

== Current research ==
Much of Bialystok's current research concentrates on bilingualism from childhood through older adulthood and aging, and its effects on cognitive processes over the lifespan. She has also studied aspects of language acquisition in children, both in written and verbal forms, and how bilingualism might affect these processes. Although her primary focus is bilingualism, she also examines the effect of musical training on the same elements of cognitive development and cognitive aging.

== Bilingualism and cognitive development in children ==
Bilingualism has been shown through various studies to have a significant effect on certain aspects of cognitive development, especially in comparison to that of monolingual individuals. Bialystok has investigated this idea further, attempting to figure out what parts of cognitive development, specifically, are affected by bilingualism. Children are of particular interest to this realm of research, as she studies the developmental progression of bilingual children as opposed to that of monolingual children.

=== Executive control ===
While bilingualism has repeatedly been shown to affect cognitive development, research has been less focused on which aspects of cognitive development, in particular, are affected. Bialystok and Barac, in a study about the generality of bilingual effects on development, compared three groups of bilinguals to one group of monolinguals in a series of linguistic tasks and one nonlinguistic, executive control task involving task-switching. The three bilingual groups differed according to three factors: similarity between languages spoken, cultural background, and language of educational experience. All three bilingual groups outperformed the monolingual group on the task-switching executive control task, however, even in excluding the monolingual group, neither of the three differentiating factors had a significant effect on the performance of the executive control task. These results suggest that bilingualism itself provides an advantage in the nonverbal, executive control aspect of cognitive development.

Executive control is known to involve three main components including selective attention/inhibition, attention shifting, and working memory. In a separate study, Bialystok examined the difference in development and subsequent coordination of these three components of executive function in bilingual children as opposed to that of monolingual children. Two groups of children who were either monolingual or bilingual completed a complex classification task that required the use of either one or multiple components of executive control functions. This was done with the use of visual and/or auditory stimuli, where a single-modality version presented either the visual or auditory component, requiring the use of just one executive control component, and a dual-modality version that combined the two, and therefore required the use of multiple executive control components. The single-modality condition did not elicit significantly different performance by either the monolinguals or bilinguals, however, in the dual-modality condition that required the use of multiple components, bilinguals performed with much higher accuracy than the monolinguals.

Beyond this general advantage to cognitive development seen in bilinguals, there is remarkable evidence for an advantage regarding executive control in particular – specifically in cases where multiple components of this executive control is required for perform a task. This has implications for real-world situations, as multitasking is a common everyday function that bilinguals could possibly perform better at than monolinguals.

Regarding the reason behind this advantage, no definitive evidence has been collected. However, it is thought that because bilinguals must constantly shift between two languages, selecting the correct words from one while ignoring competing information from the other, that they have more practice in simultaneously using multiple components of executive functioning. Because bilinguals go through this process on a daily basis throughout their lifespan, they therefore gain an advantage over monolingual individuals who do not recruit this same simultaneous function as often.

=== Language immersion and bilingualism ===
Children generally acquire language naturally both through their environment and their parents, as well as others within their community. This generally happens with one language that becomes the child's native language, but also can happen with a second language in the case of a bilingual child. Though most bilingual children are brought up with this second language from very early on in life, some bilinguals learn a second language later on, or through different, less conventional means. Bialystok, Hermanto, and Moreno examined a group of children in grades 2 and 5 who were placed in an intensive French immersion program within the context of an English-speaking community. The children's schooling was conducted solely in French, creating an educational environment with a completely separate language from their home environment in which only English (or another native language) was spoken.

Children's progress in their development of both English and French linguistic and metalinguistic skills were examined to assess how accurately their developing abilities matched those of fully bilingual children (those who had learned their second language at home), and whether or not the intensive French immersion was impeding their English language development. While the analysis of tasks concerning linguistic and metalinguistic abilities in both French and English found a variety of different patterns, many of those patterns matched that of the fully bilingual children. Thus, these children participating in this immersion program are not only able to truly become bilingual, but gain the advantages that come with bilingualism as well. Continued exposure to French as well as instruction in the formal structures of the language should only improve upon these children's developing linguistic skills.

=== Phonological awareness and early reading ===
Phonological awareness is a necessary prerequisite in learning to read in any language. However, when it comes to children who are learning to read two different languages, particularly those with different writing systems, these processes by which the child ultimately learns to read must differ in some way in comparison to children learning just one language's writing system on its own. Bialystok and Luk studied English-Cantonese bilingual children to investigate the relationship between phonological awareness and early reading in children learning languages with different writing systems. Children participated in two testing sessions, one in English and one in Cantonese. Testing sessions included assessments of working memory and cognitive ability, in addition to phonological awareness and word identification tasks to determine whether phonological awareness and word identification (early reading) use similar or different types of processes.

Results demonstrated two different types of processing. Phonological awareness, which was strongly correlated across the two languages, suggests a common cognitive basis regardless of the language being learned. Word identification, in contrast, did not relate across the two languages, suggesting a specific ability governed by each individual language and its particular demands. In the case of bilingual children learning to read two different writing systems, phonological awareness appears to be a more generalized ability that can be transferred easily across languages, while word identification (and therefore reading) must be developed separately for each language.

== Bilingualism throughout the lifespan ==
The advantages of bilingualism as it relates to children has been tested and replicated throughout numerous studies. Pushing this notion further comes the possibility that bilingualism might remain throughout adulthood and aging in general. The question then becomes how aging throughout a lifetime affects the cognitive advantage, and in what ways.

=== Cognitive advantages in adults ===
Considering the bilingual advantage previously discussed as seen in adult bilinguals, interest arises regarding the physical brain structures and neural processes that regulate certain aspects of executive control, such as inhibition. Bialystok, Luk, Craik, Grady, and Anderson used fMRI technology to examine the active brain regions of both monolingual and bilingual young adults during tasks representing either interference suppression, by manually pressing a correct response key, or response inhibition, where participants had to intentionally inhibit a specific eye movement.

In the response inhibition condition, both the monolinguals and bilinguals activated the same neural network and performed the task in the same amount of time. However, in the interference suppression trials, bilinguals activated different neural regions than monolinguals and also performed the task more quickly. The distinction in neural response between monolinguals and bilinguals indicates not only that interference suppression and response inhibition are cognitively distinct from one another, but also supports the idea that bilingualism provides an advantage in the cognitive control of inhibition concerning conscious attention (manual key pressing), but doesn't not seem to have a significant effect regarding the control of more instantaneous motor responses (inhibition of eye movements).

=== Advantages and other effects of aging ===
It appears that the bilingual advantage seen in children may persist, and even strengthen, throughout adulthood. A possible explanation for this continual advantage suggests that the constant management of two equally prominent languages competing for attention recruits the use of executive functions more often, and that this ability continually enhances functions of executive control. Furthermore, this advantage may extend further and possibly help to slow the natural declination of cognitive control brought about by the aging process.

Bialystok, Craik, and Luk tested both younger and older monolingual and bilingual adults on a variety of tasks assessing working memory, lexical retrieval, and executive control to further investigate the specific ways in which bilingualism affects cognition, and how aging can modify these effects. The effect of the language group differed according to each task, where both monolinguals and bilinguals performed about similarly on working memory tasks, monolinguals outperformed bilinguals on lexical retrieval tasks, and bilinguals outperformed monolinguals on executive control tasks. Further analysis showed that bilinguals did, in fact, have inferior language knowledge as compared to monolinguals, yet similar working memory abilities. However, bilinguals did show overall superior executive control functions to their monolingual counterparts. In addition, the greatest levels of executive control were achieved by the older bilingual group, in accordance with the prediction that bilingualism throughout the lifespan attenuates the age-related deterioration of executive control tasks – those tasks that were nonverbal in nature, as bilinguals tend to do worse than monolinguals on linguistic measures.

Further work was done with groups of younger and older monolingual and bilingual adults in three consecutive studies investigating the persistence of the bilingual advantage into adulthood, as well as the notion that bilingualism provides a defense against the deterioration that aging brings on executive control. Bialystok, Craik, Klein, and Viswanathan found that results indicated a continuation of the bilingual advantage into adulthood, and a pattern that suggests a slowing of age-related decline in executive processes for older bilingual adults along with other positive effects in cognitive functioning, suggesting widespread benefits of bilingualism beyond what was originally hypothesized.

== Bilingualism and the onset of dementia ==
The natural process of aging has a deteriorating effect on the brain, and commonly leads to detrimental conditions such as dementia or more specifically, Alzheimer's disease. With the bilingual advantage that appears to persist throughout a person's lifespan, it is plausible that symptoms of these conditions could be offset or further delayed by the lifelong advantages brought about by bilingualism.

=== White matter and brain reserve ===
As people grow older, it has been shown that white matter integrity in the brain generally decreases as the natural process of aging takes its course, resulting in a decline of cognitive functioning and control. Because previous work has demonstrated a greater cognitive ability in older bilingual adults, however, it is thought that lifelong bilingualism may mitigate this cognitive decline, resulting in a higher level of white matter integrity and connectivity in these individuals, and therefore greater cognitive ability over that of their monolingual counterparts.

Bialystok, Luk, Craik, and Grady, using diffusion tensor imaging (DTI), measured the amount of white matter integrity in both monolingual and bilingual older adults. The results were consistent with the prediction and demonstrate a strong correlation between lifelong bilingualism and preserved white matter integrity, which might ultimately contribute to the higher level of brain reserve found in these bilingual individuals. A possible explanation holds that continued experience in the maintenance and management of two competing languages enhances and strengthens certain structural pathways in the brain, resulting in a widespread network of white matter connectivity, which then helps protect against natural cognitive decline.

=== Cognitive reserve and Alzheimer's disease ===
Like the protection bilingualism appears to provide against general cognitive deterioration, it has been hypothesized that bilingualism may also slow the onset of symptoms specifically brought about by Alzheimer's disease (AD). It is thought that bilingualism might be a factor contributing to cognitive reserve, which in turn, may help delay the onset of Alzheimer's symptoms.

Bialystok, Craik, Fischer, Ware, and Schweizer analyzed and measured brain atrophy in both monolingual and bilingual patients diagnosed with AD using computed tomography (CT) scans with the logic that bilingual patients, when matched with monolingual patients on level of disease severity, should exhibit more atrophy in areas typically used to discriminate between AD patients and healthy ones, as their enhanced cognitive reserve brought about by bilingualism would allow a higher level of functioning than would usually be associated with that level of disease. Results supported this notion and found that the bilingual patients with AD did, in fact, show a greater level of brain atrophy in relevant areas. Even with this increased level of atrophy, however, the bilingual group still performed at the same cognitive level as their monolingual counterparts. These results support the hypothesis maintaining that bilingualism works as a contributor to cognitive reserve and acts as a modifier to behavioral expression that underlies brain atrophy associated with Alzheimer's disease.

Further research supports the above hypothesis, and extends it claiming that bilingualism can postpone the onset of the symptoms of AD by as much as 4–5 years. Bialystok, Craik, and Freedman collected data from bilingual and monolingual patients diagnosed with probable Alzheimer's disease regarding, most importantly, age of onset of cognitive impairment and language history and abilities. A 4.3 year delay in diagnosis and a 5.1 year delay in the reported onset of symptoms was found for the bilinguals in comparison to the monolinguals. Not only do these data support the notion of bilingualism contributing to cognitive reserve, thereby compensating for higher levels of brain atrophy, but also that bilingualism might even postpone the onset of AD symptoms by a dramatic 4–5 years.

== Publications ==
- Bialystok, E. (2001). Bilingualism in Development: Language, Literacy, and Cognition. Cambridge: Cambridge University Press. ISBN 978-0-521-63231-7.
- Bialystok, E., Craik, F. I. M., Klein, R., & Viswanathan, M. (2004). Bilingualism, Aging, and Cognitive Control: Evidence From the Simon Task. Psychology and Aging., 19(2), 290–303. doi:10.1037/0882-7974.19.2.290. ISSN 0882-7974. PMID 15222822.
- Bialystok, E., Craik, F. I., & Luk, G. (2012). Bilingualism: consequences for mind and brain. Trends in cognitive sciences, 16(4), 240–250. doi:10.1016/j.tics.2012.03.001. ISSN 1364-6613. PMID 22464592. PMC 3322418.

== Awards and recognition ==
Among her extensive list of publications in the form of books, scientific research articles, and book chapters, Bialystok has made a name for herself as an esteemed researcher and received much recognition in doing so, including:

- Officer of the Order of Canada (2016)
- Tier 1 Walter Gordon York Research Chair in Lifespan Cognitive Development (2016)
- Canadian Society for Brain Behavior and Cognitive Science Hebb Award (2011)
- Killam Prize for the Social Sciences (2010)
- York University President's Research Award of Merit (2009)
- Donald T. Stuss Award for Research Excellence at the Baycrest Geriatric Centre (2005)
- Fellow of the Royal Society of Canada (2003)
- Dean's Award for Outstanding Research (2002)
- Killam Research Fellowship (2001)
- Walter Gordon Research Fellowship (1999)

On June 30, 2016, Bialystok was named an Officer of the Order of Canada by Governor General David Johnston for "her contributions to our understanding of the cognitive benefits of bilingualism and for opening up new avenues of research in her field".
