= Raymond Yong =

Raymond Yong, CQ FRSC (born April 10, 1929 in Singapore) is a retired Canadian environmental engineer. His father, Yong Ngim Djin, was principal of Anglo-Chinese School, and he first studied in the United States at Washington & Jefferson College due to his godfather, who was a Methodist missionary. He started in medicine, but switched to physics. He became an important instructor at McGill University. He is also an authority on contaminated soil and has 60 patents. In 1985 he won the Izaak-Walton-Killam Award.
