= Mark Zanna =

Canadian psychologist (1944–2020)

- Born: Mark Peter Zanna; 4 March 1944
- Died: 22 February 2020 (aged 75)
- Education: Yale University
- Scientific career
- Fields: social psychology
- Workplaces: University of Waterloo
- Thesis: On inferring one's beliefs from one's behavior in a low-choice setting: the effect of initial attitudes and perceived motivation (1970)
- Doctoral advisor: Charles Kiesler

Mark Zanna, FRSC (March 4, 1944 – February 22, 2020) was a social psychologist at the University of Waterloo. He was well known for his work on attitudes and intergroup relations. He earned his Ph.D. from Yale University.

== Research ==
A major debate among attitude researchers in the 1970s concerned whether cognitive dissonance theory or self-perception theory best accounted for how people's attitudes change. While at Princeton University, Zanna and Joel Cooper conducted a landmark experiment that resolved the discrepancy in favor of cognitive dissonance. They demonstrated that arousal is necessary for some instances of attitude change—a precondition specified by dissonance theory but not by self-perception theory.

Zanna also demonstrated the existence of self-fulfilling prophecies within intergroup interactions. At the time, one explanation for why white Americans tended to be hired more often than African Americans was that African American candidates tended to perform poorly in job interviews (i.e., that it was due to actual performance, not prejudice on the part of white interviewers). Zanna and his fellow researchers demonstrated that it was actually non-verbal cues on the part of white interviewers that elicited poor performance from African American candidates. That is, interviewers expected African American candidates to perform poorly and treated them more coldly, causing poor performance in response.

In a subsequent experiment, the researchers demonstrated that white candidates performed just as poorly when the interviewer treated them the way the previous African American candidates had been treated.

== Awards ==
- 1997 - Society for Personality and Social Psychology, Donald T. Campbell Award
- 1999 - Fellow of the Royal Society of Canada, Social Sciences Division
- 2007 - Society of Experimental Social Psychology, Distinguished Scientist Award
- 2011 - Killam Research Fellowship, Social Sciences

== See also ==
- List of University of Waterloo people
- Attitude (psychology)
- Cognitive Dissonance
