= John Whalley (economist) =

Canadian economist (born 1947)

John Whalley FRSC (born 8 May 1947) is a Canadian economist. He is a professor emeritus at the University of Western Ontario and previously held the William G. Davis Chair in International Trade. He is a distinguished fellow of the Centre for International Governance Innovation.

He studied economics at the University of Essex in the United Kingdom, graduating BA in 1968. From Yale University he holds the degrees of MA (1970), MPhil (1971) and PhD (1973). At Yale, he was a teaching assistant to Joseph Stiglitz.

He was elected a fellow of the Econometric Society in 1990.

In 2009, Whalley was awarded a Hellmuth Prize for Achievement in Research at the University of Western Ontario. In 2012, he received the Killam Prize awarded by the Canada Council.
