= Office of the Fairness Commissioner =

- Bureau du commissaire à l’équité

Agency overview
- Formed: 2007; 19 years ago
- Type: Crown agency
- Jurisdiction: Government of Ontario
- Headquarters: 180 Dundas Street West, Suite 300; Toronto, Ontario
- Key document: Fair Access to Regulated Professions and Compulsory Trades Act
- Website: fairnesscommissioner.ca

The Office of the Fairness Commissioner (French: Bureau du commissaire à l’équité) is an arm's length Crown agency of the Government of Ontario that is responsible for ensuring that Ontarians with professional credentials from foreign countries can have fair access to regulated professions and trades in Ontario.

The office is independent of the regulated professions and the government. It was created by the Fair Access to Regulated Professions Act, which came into force on 1 March 2007.

== List of commissioners ==
- Jean Augustine, 2007–2015
- Mary Shenstone, 2015–2016
- Grant Jameson, 2017–2019
- Irwin Glasberg, 2020–present

== See also ==
- Criticism of Canada relating to foreign credentials
- Ministry of Citizenship and Immigration (Ontario)
