= Elizabeth A. Edwards =

Canadian chemical and environmental engineer

Elizabeth Anne Edwards is a retired Canadian chemical engineer and environmental engineer, and an expert on the biological degradation of pollutants. She is University Professor, emerita, in the Department of Chemical Engineering & Applied Chemistry at the University of Toronto, where she held a Canada Research Chair in Anaerobic Biotechnology.

== Education and career ==
Edwards was a student of chemical engineering at McGill University, where she received a bachelor's degree in 1983 and a master's degree in 1985. She went on to doctoral study in civil and environmental engineering at Stanford University, where she completed her Ph.D. in 1993.

After consulting work in Guelph, Ontario from 1992 to 1995, she became an assistant professor at McMaster University, supported by an NSERC Faculty Award, in 1995. She moved to the University of Toronto in 1997, adding a cross appointment in Cell and Systems Biology in 2002. She was given a tier 1 Canada Research Chair in Anaerobic Biotechnology in 2014, renewed in 2022.

In 2002, she founded spin-off company SiREM, and in 2014 she co-founded another spin-off, Savant Technical Consulting.

She retired as a professor emerita in 2026.

== Recognition ==
Edwards is a 2003 recipient of the Ontario Premier’s Research Excellence Award, a 2008 recipient of a Killam Research Fellowship, the 2010 recipient of the Kalev Pugi Award of Society of Chemical Industry Canada, the 2011 recipient of the Ontario Professional Engineers Medal in Research and Development, and the 2016 recipient of the Killam Prize in Engineering of the Canada Council for the Arts. In 2026, she received the Miroslaw Romanowski Medal of the Royal Society of Canada, an award for outstanding accomplishments in environmental science.

In 2011 she was elected as a Fellow of the American Association for the Advancement of Science and as a Fellow of the Canadian Academy of Engineering. She was elected to the Royal Society of Canada in 2012.

She was named an Officer of the Order of Canada in 2020.
