= Racialization =

Sociological concept of racial identities

Racialization or ethnicization is a sociological concept used to describe the intent and processes by which ethnic or racial identities are systematically constructed within a society. Constructs for racialization are centered on erroneous generalizations about racial aspects of distinct groups, leading to the denial of equal societal engagement. It is a fallacy of groupism and a process of racial dominance that has lasting harmful or damaging outcomes for racialized groups. An associated term is self-racialization, which refers to the practice by dominant groups to justify and defend their dominant status or to deny its existence. Individually, self-racialization may not be consistent throughout one's lifetime.

== Process concepts ==
=== Racialized incorporation ===
The process of racialization can affect newly arriving immigrants as well as their second-generation children in the United States. According to sociologist Ali R. Chaudhary, the concept of racialized incorporation bridges the idea of assimilation with critical race studies in general and the concept of racialization in particular. While immigrants may possess specific ethnic and cultural identities associated with their countries of origin, once they arrive in the U.S., they are incorporated into a society that is largely organized along the lines of race. The racial hierarchy in the United States is pervasive in many aspects of life, including housing, education, and employment. The racialized incorporation perspective argues that regardless of the ethnic and cultural differences across immigrant groups, racial identification is the ultimate and primary principle of social organization in the United States. Because the lived experiences of Whites and Blacks in U.S. society diverge in most areas of social life, the racialized category that immigrants and their children are incorporated into will largely determine their experiences and opportunities in the United States. The process of racialization and involuntary incorporation is a topic of research interest in the United States.

== Intersectional racializations ==
=== Racialization of religion ===
Religious groups can also go through the process of racialization. Adherents of Judaism, Islam, Hinduism and Sikhism can be racialized when they are portrayed as possessing certain physical characteristics, despite the fact that many individual adherents of those religions do not possess any of those physical characteristics. (Note: Although they accept converts, Jews are an ethnoreligious group, because they constitute an ethnicity as well as a religion. See racial antisemitism and religious antisemitism.)

=== Racialization of labor ===
Marta Maria Maldonado has identified the racialization of labor to involve the segregation and appointment of workers based on perceived ethnic differences. This racialization of labor is said to produce a hierarchical arrangement which limits employee agency and mobility based on their race. The process of racialization is reinforced through presupposed, stereotypical qualities which are imposed upon the racialized person by the racializer.

Members of the dominant race in a society benefit from various privileges, such as white privilege in societies where people classified as white make up the dominant racial group, whether these are material or psychological, and are maintained and reproduced within social systems.

Furthermore, research by Edna Bonacich, Sabrina Alimahomed Jake B. Wilson, 2008 regarding the effects of race and criminal background on employment concluded that "dominant racialized labor groups (mainly White/European workers) are in general afforded more privileges than subordinate racialized labor groups (workers of color)" Additionally, According to Chetty, Hendren, Kline, and Saez, the effect of race segregation impacts the labor market, saying "upward income mobility is significantly lower in areas with larger African American Populations".

=== Racialization and gender ===
Racialization and gender can often intersect. Racialized gender-specific categories can emerge in the process of racialization. For example, an African woman who immigrates to the United States may be viewed through stereotypes pertaining to African-American women.

=== Racialization and disease ===
Diseases have been racialized throughout history, such as through social Darwinism, scientific racism, and eugenics. Examples include the association of Mexican immigrants to the United States with the "1916 typhus outbreak, the midcentury Bracero Program, and medical deportations that are taking place today." Historian Alan M. Kraut calls such examples "medicalized nativism," where the justification for such procedures "includes charges that [particular groups] constitute a health menace and may endanger their hosts."

== Criticism ==
In Canadian politics, conservative representatives view the sociological concept as patchy. Maxime Bernier described it as "awful jargon" and argued that it contradicts the goal of creating a color-blind society. In response, liberal representatives contended that the realities of racism are more pervasive. They argued that "denying the very real experiences of people who live with racism every day" only supports the status quo and avoids the responsibility of actively working to eradicate racism. In 2019, Hochman, a proponent of the theory of racialization, pointed out that the concept of racialization is often misidentified as relating to races or what constitutes a race, leading race-skeptic scholars in academia to discourage its use, while it actually pertains to how races are systemically and socially grouped for marginalization. Based on "what it does", the outcome of such marginalization is explained by systemic racism.

== See also ==
- Black Codes (United States)
- Critical race theory
- Oppression
- Othering
- Postcolonialism
- Racialized society
- Scientific racism
- Stigmatization
- Racial privilege
