= Višķi Parish =

Parish of Latvia

- parish of Latvia
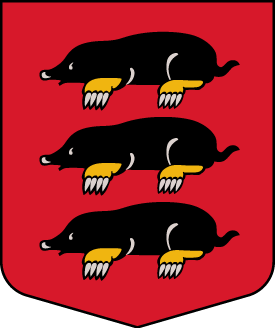
- Coat of arms

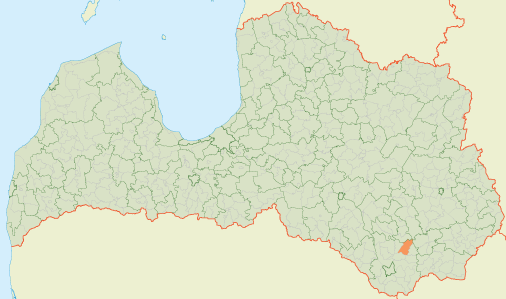
- 56°04′07″N 26°47′30″E
- Country: Latvia

Area
  - Total: 104.26 km^{2} (40.26 sq mi)
  - Land: 95.25 km^{2} (36.78 sq mi)
  - Water: 9.01 km^{2} (3.48 sq mi)

Population (1 January 2025)
  - Total: 1,277
  - Density: 13.41/km^{2} (34.72/sq mi)
- Website: www.viski.lv

Višķi Parish (Latvian: Višķu pagasts) is an administrative unit of Augšdaugava Municipality in the Latgale region of Latvia.

== Towns, villages and settlements of Višķi Parish ==
- Višķi
