= James Pinfold =

British/Canadian particle physicist

James Lewis Pinfold ARCS FRSC (born 1950 in Ealing, West London) is a British-Canadian physicist, specializing in particle physics.

== Education and career ==
Pinfold graduated in physics in 1972 with a B.Sc. from Imperial College London and in 1977 with a Ph.D. from the University of London. His Ph.D. thesis was on weak neutral currents, stemming from his work as part of the Gargamelle discovery team. From 1977 to 1989, he held research assistant and senior research assistant positions at CERN (near Geneva) and Fermilab (near Chicago). From 1989 to 1992, he was an associate professor at the Weizmann Institute of Science. At the University of Alberta, he was from 1992 to 1996 an associate professor and from 1996 to 2016 a full professor, and he is since 2016 a distinguished university professor. From 1995 to 2004 he was the University of Alberta's Centre for Subatomic Research (renamed in 2006 the Centre for Particle Physics). Since 2005 he has held a visiting professorship at King's College London. He frequently travels back and forth between the University of Alberta and CERN in Geneva. He is the author or co-author of over 1250 citable publications and has given over 220 invited talks.

Pinfold was from 1988 to 1989 the spokesperson for CERN's WA88 experiment. From 1987 to 1992 he was the spokesperson for the MODAL experiment at CERN's Large Electron Positron Collider (LEP). He was one of the founders in the 1990s of the ATLAS experiment involved in the Large Hadron Collider (LHC) discovery of the Higgs boson. From 2000 to 2002 he was the deputy spokesperson for ATLAS-Canada. Since 2000 he is the leader and spokesperson for the MoEDAL experiment. From 2004 to 2010 he was the deputy co-spokesperson for the SLIM experiment.

In 2007, he won an award from ASTech (Alberta Science & Technology Leadership Foundation) for his leadership in starting the Alberta Large-area Time-coincidence Array, or ALTA, Project. This educational and research project "involves spreading out many cosmic-ray detectors over vast areas, connecting them through the Internet, and synchronising their readings with an integrated GPS system. Most of the detectors are run by high school students". In 2013 he was elected a Fellow of the Royal Society of Canada (RSC). In 2025, he was a recipient of the Breakthrough Prize in Fundamental Physics as a member of the ATLAS Collaboration.

== Selected publications ==
- Hasert, F.J.; et al. (1973). "Search for elastic muon-neutrino electron scattering". Physics Letters B. 46 (1): 121–124. Bibcode:1973PhLB...46..121H. doi:10.1016/0370-2693(73)90494-2. 1973
- Dowler, B.; et al. (2002). "Performance of the ATLAS hadronic end-cap calorimeter in beam tests". Nuclear Instruments and Methods in Physics Research Section A: Accelerators, Spectrometers, Detectors and Associated Equipment. 482 (1–2): 94–124. Bibcode:2002NIMPA.482...94D. doi:10.1016/S0168-9002(01)01338-9.
- Cojocaru, C.; et al. (2004). "Hadronic calibration of the ATLAS liquid argon end-cap calorimeter in the pseudorapidity region in beam tests". Nuclear Instruments and Methods in Physics Research Section A: Accelerators, Spectrometers, Detectors and Associated Equipment. 531 (3): 481–514. arXiv:physics/0407009. doi:10.1016/j.nima.2004.05.133. S2CID 17438653.
- Acharya, B.; et al. (2014). "The physics programme of the MoEDAL experiment at the LHC". International Journal of Modern Physics A. 29 (23). arXiv:1405.7662. Bibcode:2014IJMPA..2930050A. doi:10.1142/S0217751X14300506. S2CID 53052454.
- Burdin, S.; Fairbairn, M.; Mermod, P.; Milstead, D.; Pinfold, J.; Sloan, T.; Taylor, W. (2015). "Non-collider searches for stable massive particles". Physics Reports. 582: 1–52. arXiv:1410.1374. Bibcode:2015PhR...582....1B. doi:10.1016/j.physrep.2015.03.004. S2CID 118333394.
- Acharya, B.; et al. (2017). "Search for Magnetic Monopoles with the MoEDAL Forward Trapping Detector in 13 TeV Proton-Proton Collisions at the LHC". Physical Review Letters. 118 (6) 061801. arXiv:1611.06817. Bibcode:2017PhRvL.118f1801A. doi:10.1103/PhysRevLett.118.061801. hdl:10138/178854. PMID 28234515. S2CID 43118193.
- Avoni, G.; Bruschi, M.; Cabras, G.; Caforio, D.; Dehghanian, N.; Floderus, A.; Giacobbe, B.; Giannuzzi, F.; Giorgi, F.; Grafström, P.; Hedberg, V.; Manghi, F. Lasagni; Meneghini, S.; Pinfold, J.; Richards, E.; Sbarra, C.; Cesari, N. Semprini; Sbrizzi, A.; Soluk, R.; Ucchielli, G.; Valentinetti, S.; Viazlo, O.; Villa, M.; Vittori, C.; Vuillermet, R.; Zoccoli, A. (2018). "The new LUCID-2 detector for luminosity measurement and monitoring in ATLAS". Journal of Instrumentation. 13 (7) P07017. Bibcode:2018JInst..13P7017A. doi:10.1088/1748-0221/13/07/P07017.
- Acharya, B.; et al. (2019). "Magnetic Monopole Search with the Full MoEDAL Trapping Detector in 13 TeV pp Collisions Interpreted in Photon-Fusion and Drell-Yan Production". Physical Review Letters. 123 (2) 021802. arXiv:1903.08491. Bibcode:2019PhRvL.123b1802A. doi:10.1103/PhysRevLett.123.021802. PMID 31386510. S2CID 84842625.
- Acharya, B.; et al. (2022). "Search for magnetic monopoles produced via the Schwinger mechanism". Nature. 602 (7895): 63–67. arXiv:2106.11933. Bibcode:2022Natur.602...63A. doi:10.1038/s41586-021-04298-1. hdl:11585/852746. PMID 35110756. S2CID 246488582.
