= Clara Thomas =

Clara Thomas may refer to:

- Clara Thomas (academic), Canadian professor of English
- Clara Thomas (politician), member of the Nevada Assembly
