= Trade Controls Bureau (Canada) =

The Trade Controls Bureau (TCB) authorizes, under the discretion of the Minister of Foreign Affairs, the import and export of goods restricted by quotas and/or tariffs. It also monitors the trade in certain goods and ensures the personal security of Canadians and citizens of other countries by restricting trade in dangerous goods and other materials.
