= Racialized society =

Society where race is important

A racialized society is a society where socioeconomic inequality, residential segregation and low intermarriage rates are the norm, where human definitions of personal identity and choices of intimate relationships reveal racial distinctiveness.

A racialized society is a society that has undergone strong racialization, where perceived race matters profoundly for life experiences, opportunities, and interpersonal relationships.

A racialized society can also be said to be "a society that allocates differential economic, political, social, and even psychological rewards to group along perceived racial lines; lines that are socially constructed."

== United States ==
It is argued that racial/ethnic identity are not separate or autonomous categories and what is called 'racial categories' in the United States are actually racialized ethnic categories.

United States society is considered by some to be a racialized society in which divisions between the racial/ethnic groups are given. Critical race theory argues that racism is normal and is engrained [sic] in the fabric and system of the American society. There are ongoing racial disparities between races in the United States in employment, housing, religion, and race-conscious institutions. Some scholars argue that a "privileged/non-privileged dynamic" exists. This means that cultural practice assigns value and assumed competence to people who have certain characteristics or features. The social psychological approach maintains that prejudice socialized early in life feeds racial stereotypes.

It is often said that social interaction is infused with a privileged / non-privileged dynamic which is defined by racial identity — is very complex issue. Racialization hurts both the privileged and the non-privileged, but hurts the non-privileged most.

Until the 1960s there was legal racial discrimination in the United States. The end of legal discrimination produced major improvements, but scarcely was successful in wiping the slate clean of the many legacies of more than three centuries of formalized state supported inequality. Even after the era of official social discrimination and segregation, the lingering residual practices kept African Americans in lower-caste status. Racial problems were viewed as the nation's "most important problem" and many observers felt the United States was in a state of racial crisis. Racially related issues, such as welfare, crime, segregation, "permissive judges", affirmative action, group based rights, difference-blind treatment, and government regulation and state neutrality with respect to group, have been the subject of strenuous political debate and legislation in the past three decades. Significant gaps between blacks and whites in most domains that measure the quality of life continue to exist. Effective standards designed to eliminate discrimination, often described as race-conscious remedies, have been intensely debated. Supporters argue that institutional racism is so deeply and subtly embedded in the fabric of American society that little would change if more proactive methods of eliminating discrimination had been used.
