= Molly Shoichet =

Canadian biomedical engineer

Molly Sandra Shoichet FRS
- Born: 1965 (age 60–61); Toronto, Ontario, Canada
- Education: University of Massachusetts Amherst 1992, Ph.D. in polymer science and engineering
- Alma mater: Massachusetts Institute of Technology
- Awards: Gerhard Herzberg Gold Medal (2020); Order of Canada (2018); Killam Prize, Engineering (2017); L'Oreal-UNESCO for Women in Science Laureate for North America (2015); Queen Elizabeth II Diamond Jubilee Award (2013); Order of Ontario (2011)
- Scientific career
- Fields: Biomedical Engineering, drug delivery, tissue regeneration
- Workplaces: University of Toronto, Cytotherapeutics, Inc., Brown University
- Website: shoichetlab.utoronto.ca

Molly S. Shoichet FRS is a Canadian science professor at the University of Toronto specializing in chemistry, biomaterials and biomedical engineering. She was Ontario's first Chief Scientist. Shoichet is a biomedical engineer known for her work in tissue engineering, and is the only person to be a fellow of the three National Academies in Canada.

== Education ==
Shoichet studied at the Massachusetts Institute of Technology and received her bachelor's degree in chemistry in 1987. She attended the University of Massachusetts Amherst for her doctoral studies and earned her PhD in polymer science and engineering in 1992.

== Career ==
After receiving her doctorate, Shoichet joined the faculty of Brown University as an adjunct professor, while simultaneously working in industry. Shoichet joined the University of Toronto Faculty of Applied Science and Engineering in 1995, where she remains as of 2026. Her work includes tissue and polymer engineering, focusing on drug delivery and tissue regeneration. Early in her career, she studied the blood–brain barrier. Her lab's methods involve using a gel to deliver drugs to a specific location in the central nervous system and to bypass the blood-brain barrier. The drugs delivered in this way include chemotherapy drugs and agents to slow or reverse damage from a stroke. This delivery method is also being tested with stem cells, and include studies on the use of hydrogels that deliver stem cells to nonfunctioning retinas. These hydrogels are designed to be easily injectable into the tissue and they then form a scaffold for cells to grow in the appropriate three-dimensional shape.

In 2015, Shoichet co-founded Research2Reality to showcase scientific research in Canada through a combination of accessible blog posts and short videos. She has also curated the "Artful Science" exhibit at the Toronto Pearson International Airport.

In November 2017, Shoichet was named as Ontario's first Chief Scientist by then Premier Kathleen Wynne. She was leading a team of six to build connections between the federal government, science and business sectors, and promote the use of evidence in policy development.

On 3 July 2018, Shoichet was dismissed from her position by the newly elected Conservative government of Ontario when the office of chief scientist was eliminated.

== Honours and awards ==
In 2010, Shoichet was one of 30 people to be awarded the Order of Ontario.

Shoichet was the North American recipient of the L'Oréal-UNESCO Awards for Women in Science in 2015 for her work on regeneration of nerve tissue, and in developing direct drug delivery methods for the spinal cord and brain using novel materials. She has advocated for women in science and women professors.

The University of Toronto designated her a "University Professor" in 2014. She is the only person to be a fellow of the three National Academies in Canada. The University of Toronto also honored her in 2013 as an "Inventor of the Year". She is the 2017 winner of the Kalev Pugi Award of the Chemical Institute of Canada. She holds the Canada Research Chair in Tissue Engineering.

In 2017, she was also awarded the Killam Prize for engineering. She was awarded Officer of the Order of Canada (OC) as per Government House of 29 December 2017.

In 2020, she was the winner of the Gerhard Herzberg Canada Gold Medal for Science and Engineering, awarded by the Natural Sciences and Engineering Research Council of Canada (NSERC).

=== Other honours ===
- Fellow, American Association for the Advancement of Science (2013)
- Queen Elizabeth II Diamond Jubilee Medal (2013)
- Fellow, Canadian Academy of Sciences of the Royal Society of Canada
- Fellow, Canadian Academy of Engineering
- Fellow, Canadian Academy of Health Sciences
- Tissue Engineering and Regenerative Medicine International Society (TERMIS) Senior Scientist Award (2014)
- Fellow, Royal Society UK
- Fellow, National Academy of Inventors

== Personal life ==
Her brother, Brian Shoichet, is a professor at the University of California, San Francisco, where he serves as Co-Vice Dean of Graduate Pharmacy Education Programs and faculty in the Department of Pharmaceutical Chemistry.

== Selected publications ==
- Obermeyer, J.M.; Ho, E.; Gracias, A.; Shoichet, M.S. (2019). "Influencing neuroplasticity in stroke treatment with advanced biomaterials-based approaches". Advanced Drug Delivery Reviews. 148. Elsevier BV: 204–218. doi:10.1016/j.addr.2018.12.012. ISSN 0169-409X. PMID 30579882. S2CID 58596418.
- Pakulska, Malgosia M.; Miersch, Shane; Shoichet, Molly S. (18 March 2016). "Designer protein delivery: From natural to engineered affinity-controlled release systems". Science. 351 (6279) aac4750. American Association for the Advancement of Science (AAAS). doi:10.1126/science.aac4750. ISSN 0036-8075. PMID 26989257. S2CID 206639193.
- Pakulska, Malgosia M.; Elliott Donaghue, Irja; Obermeyer, Jaclyn M.; Tuladhar, Anup; McLaughlin, Christopher K.; Shendruk, Tyler N.; Shoichet, Molly S. (6 May 2016). "Encapsulation-free controlled release: Electrostatic adsorption eliminates the need for protein encapsulation in PLGA nanoparticles". Science Advances. 2 (5) e1600519. American Association for the Advancement of Science (AAAS). Bibcode:2016SciA....2E0519P. doi:10.1126/sciadv.1600519. ISSN 2375-2548. PMC 4928928. PMID 27386554.
- Ganesh, Ahil N.; McLaughlin, Christopher K.; Duan, Da; Shoichet, Brian K.; Shoichet, Molly S. (28 March 2017). "A New Spin on Antibody–Drug Conjugates: Trastuzumab-Fulvestrant Colloidal Drug Aggregates Target HER2-Positive Cells". ACS Applied Materials & Interfaces. 9 (14). American Chemical Society (ACS): 12195–12202. Bibcode:2017AAMI....912195G. doi:10.1021/acsami.6b15987. ISSN 1944-8244. PMC 5486225. PMID 28319364.
- Fisher, Stephanie A.; Tam, Roger Y.; Fokina, Ana; Mahmoodi, M. Mohsen; Distefano, Mark D.; Shoichet, Molly S. (2018). "Photo-immobilized EGF chemical gradients differentially impact breast cancer cell invasion and drug response in defined 3D hydrogels". Biomaterials. 178. Elsevier BV: 751–766. doi:10.1016/j.biomaterials.2018.01.032. ISSN 0142-9612. PMC 6066187. PMID 29452913.
- Arnold, Amy E.; Malek-Adamian, Elise; Le, Phuong U.; Meng, Anika; Martínez-Montero, Saúl; Petrecca, Kevin; Damha, Masad J.; Shoichet, Molly S. (2018). "Antibody-Antisense Oligonucleotide Conjugate Downregulates a Key Gene in Glioblastoma Stem Cells". Molecular Therapy – Nucleic Acids. 11. Elsevier BV: 518–527. doi:10.1016/j.omtn.2018.04.004. ISSN 2162-2531. PMC 5992475. PMID 29858087. S2CID 46922410.
- Ballios, Brian G.; Cooke, Michael J.; Donaldson, Laura; Coles, Brenda L.K.; Morshead, Cindi M.; van der Kooy, Derek; Shoichet, Molly S. (2015). "A Hyaluronan-Based Injectable Hydrogel Improves the Survival and Integration of Stem Cell Progeny following Transplantation". Stem Cell Reports. 4 (6). Elsevier BV: 1031–1045. doi:10.1016/j.stemcr.2015.04.008. ISSN 2213-6711. PMC 4471829. PMID 25981414.

== See also ==
- Women in chemistry
