= Višķi =

Village in Augšdaugava Municipality, Latvia

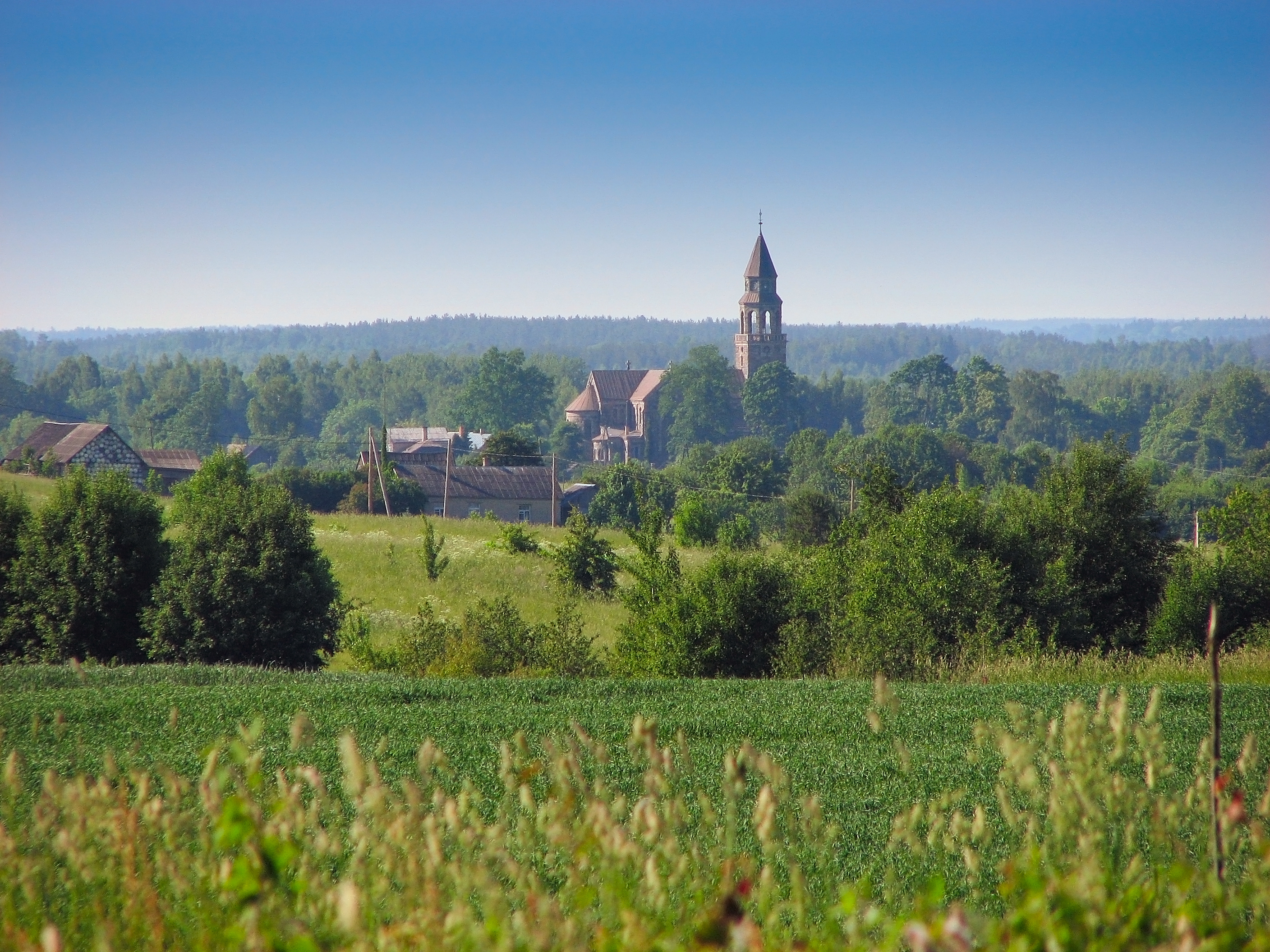
- Višķi village

- Location within Latvia
- Coordinates: 56°3′12″N 26°46′59″E
- Country: Latvia
- Municipality: Augšdaugava
- Parish: Višķi

Population (2010)
  - Total: 251
- Time zone: UTC+2 (EET)
  - Summer (DST): UTC+3 (EEST)

Višķi (Latgalian:Vyški, Yiddish: ווישקי, romanized: Vishki, Polish: Wyszki) is a village in Višķi Parish, Augšdaugava Municipality in the Latgale region of Latvia.

== History ==
Until the 1930s Višķi was a shtetl, where the majority of the inhabitants were Jewish. During World War II, from 1941 to 1942, hundreds of Jews were murdered in mass executions perpetrated by Einsatzgruppen in the surroundings and in the Daugavpils Ghetto.

== People ==
- Eliezer Palchinsky (1912-2007), rosh yeshiva in Jerusalem.
