= Moshe Shapiro =

Israeli scientist

- משה שפירו
- Born: October 1944
- Died: 3 December 2013 (aged 69)
- Known for: Contributions in the field of coherent control
- Awards: Willis Lamb Award in Quantum Optics (2007); Fellow American Physical Society (2004); Fellow UK Institute of Physics (2004); Israel Chemical Society Award (2001); Michael Landau Award (1999); Weizmann Prize of the city of Tel Aviv (1999); Kolthoff Prize of the Technion (1998); Somekh Zacks and Yeroslawsky awards of the Weizmann Institute
- Scientific career
- Fields: Chemical physics
- Workplaces: University of British Columbia

Moshe Shapiro (Hebrew: משה שפירו; October 1944 – 3 December 2013) was a chemist and physicist at the University of British Columbia.

== Research ==
Shapiro's research focused on coherent control, laser catalysis, quantum computing, transition state spectroscopy, quantum mechanics, and other areas.

== Awards and achievements ==
Shapiro published more than 300 papers, and the book Principles of the Quantum Control of Molecular Processes with P. Brumer. He won a variety of prizes for his research.

He was the Canada Research Chair Professor in Quantum Control. From 1993 to 2002, he was the Jacques Mimran Professor of Chemical Physics at the Weizmann Institute of Science, Israel.
