= Etobicoke—Lakeshore (federal electoral district) =

Federal electoral district in Ontario, Canada

Coordinates: 43.61°N 79.54°W

Ontario electoral district
- Interactive map of riding boundaries from the 2025 federal election

Federal electoral district
- Legislature: House of Commons
MP
James Maloney
Liberal
- District created: 1976
- First contested: 1979
- Last contested: 2021
- District webpage: profile, map

Demographics
- Population (2021): 141,751
- Electors (2015): 90,167
- Area (km²): 53
- Pop. density (per km²): 2,674.5
- Census division: Toronto
- Census subdivision: Toronto (part)

Etobicoke—Lakeshore (formerly known as Lakeshore and Toronto—Lakeshore) is a federal electoral district in Ontario, Canada, that has been represented in the House of Commons of Canada since 1968.

It covers the southern part of the Etobicoke portion of Toronto on the shore of Lake Ontario including the former 'Lakeshore Municipalities' of Mimico, New Toronto and Long Branch.

This riding has been a destination for Slavic immigrants. The percentage of native speakers of Slavic languages in this riding (primarily Polish, Ukrainian, Russian, Serbian, and Croatian) is 15.0%, the highest in Canada.

== Demographics ==
According to the 2021 Canadian census

Languages: 56.5% English, 3.6% Polish, 3.0% Spanish, 2.5% Ukrainian, 2.5% Portuguese, 2.1% Russian, 1.9% Italian, 1.5% Tagalog, 1.4% French, 1.3% Mandarin, 1.3% Tibetan, 1.3% Korean, 1.2% Serbian, 1.0% Arabic, 1.0% Cantonese
Religions: 55.2% Christian (32.1% Catholic, 5.3% Christian Orthodox, 3.1% Anglican, 2.6% United Church, 1.1% Presbyterian, 11.0% Other), 4.8% Muslim, 3.8% Hindu, 2.9% Buddhist, 31.2% None
Median income: $47,600 (2020)

Average income: $71,100 (2020)

Panethnic groups in Etobicoke—Lakeshore (2011−2021)
Panethnic group	2021		2016		2011	
Panethnic group	Pop.	%	Pop.	%	Pop.	%
European (Note: Statistic includes all persons that did not make up part of a visible minority or an indigenous identity.)	89,835	64.21%	90,915	71.29%	86,280	75.48%
South Asian	10,850	7.75%	7,050	5.53%	5,115	4.47%
East Asian (Note: Statistic includes total responses of "Chinese", "Korean", and "Japanese" under visible minority section on census.)	8,705	6.22%	7,520	5.9%	5,870	5.14%
African	8,020	5.73%	6,325	4.96%	4,860	4.25%
Southeast Asian (Note: Statistic includes total responses of "Filipino" and "Southeast Asian" under visible minority section on census.)	6,575	4.7%	5,570	4.37%	5,150	4.51%
Latin American	4,590	3.28%	3,060	2.4%	2,475	2.17%
Middle Eastern (Note: Statistic includes total responses of "West Asian" and "Arab" under visible minority section on census.)	3,660	2.62%	2,075	1.63%	1,630	1.43%
Indigenous	1,415	1.01%	1,250	0.98%	930	0.81%
Other/multiracial (Note: Statistic includes total responses of "Visible minority, n.i.e." and "Multiple visible minorities" under visible minority section on census.)	6,285	4.49%	3,755	2.94%	2,010	1.76%
Total responses	139,915	98.7%	127,520	98.79%	114,310	99.02%
Total population	141,751	100%	129,081	100%	115,437	100%
Notes: Totals greater than 100% due to multiple origin responses. Demographics based on 2012 Canadian federal electoral redistribution riding boundaries.

== Geography ==
Consisting of parts of the City of Toronto

== History ==
The riding was created in 1966 as "Lakeshore" from part of York—Humber, the same year the 'Lakeshore municipalities', Mimico, New Toronto, Long Branch were annexed to the new Borough of Etobicoke. In 1971, it was renamed "Toronto—Lakeshore". In 1976, it was abolished, and replaced by "Etobicoke—Lakeshore".

The riding was represented by federal Liberal Party and official Opposition leader Michael Ignatieff, who was first elected in 2006, until he was unseated in the 2011 General Election by Conservative Bernard Trottier. Trottier lost to James Maloney of the Liberals in 2015, and Maloney still holds the seat. It was previously represented by Jean Augustine. Provincially, it was represented by Peter Milczyn from 2014 to 2018, and is now represented by Christine Hogarth. On Toronto City Council, the riding is represented by Amber Morley.

In the 1988 federal election, there was no Liberal candidate on the ballot because two days after nominations were due, the Liberal candidate, Emmanuel Feuerwerker, withdrew citing heart problems after the news media reported that Mr. Feuerwerker's campaign literature claimed university degrees that he did not, in fact, possess.

This riding lost territory to Etobicoke Centre during the 2012 electoral redistribution.

=== Former boundaries ===
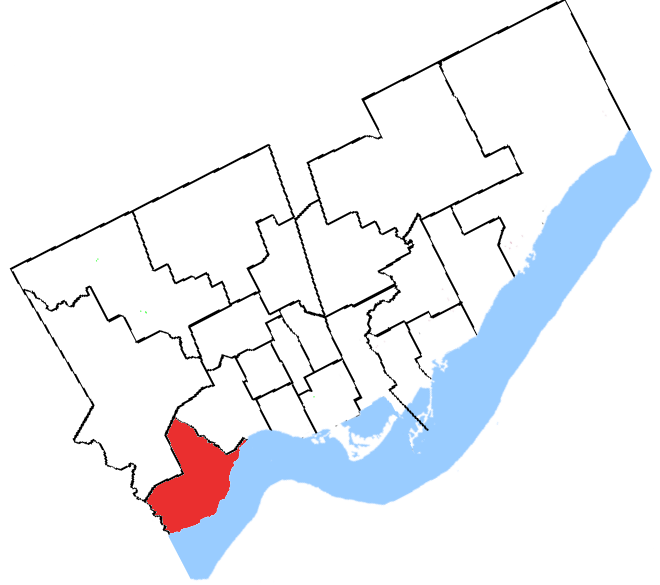
1966 to 1976

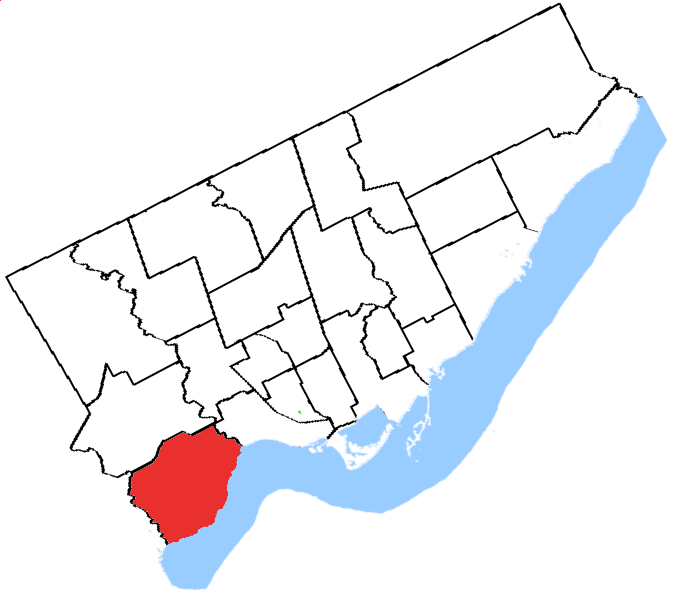
1976 to 1987

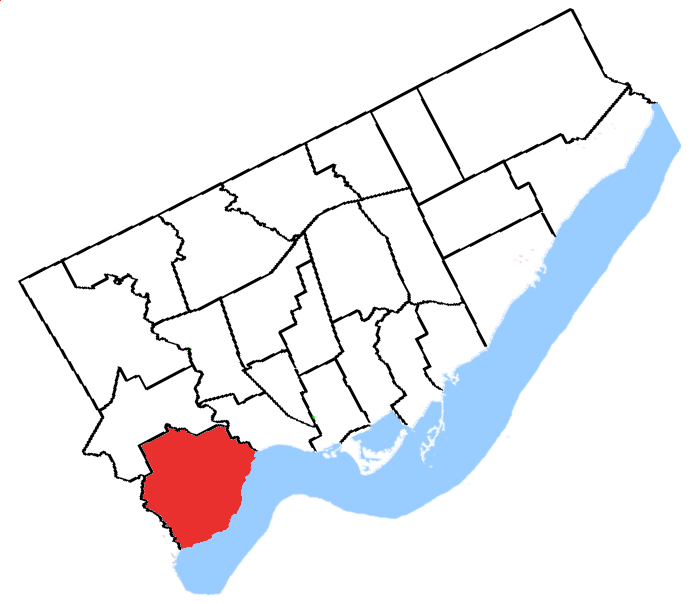
1987 to 1996

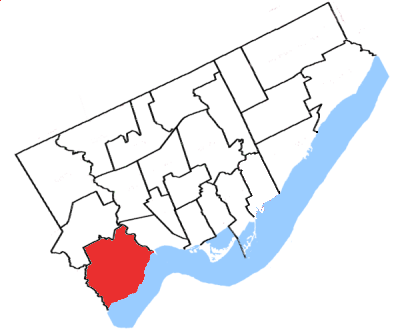
1996 to 2004

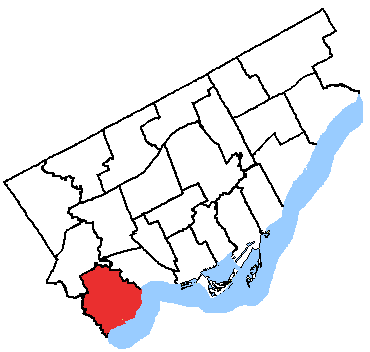
2004 to 2015

== Members of Parliament ==
This riding has elected the following members of Parliament:

Parliament	Years	Member	Party
Lakeshore; Riding created from York—Humber
28th	1968–1972	Ken Robinson	Liberal
Toronto—Lakeshore
29th	1972–1974	Terry Grier	New Democratic
30th	1974–1979	Ken Robinson	Liberal
Etobicoke—Lakeshore
31st	1979–1980	Ken Robinson	Liberal
32nd	1980–1984	Ken Robinson	Liberal
33rd	1984–1988	Patrick Boyer	Progressive Conservative
34th	1988–1993	Patrick Boyer	Progressive Conservative
35th	1993–1997	Jean Augustine	Liberal
36th	1997–2000	Jean Augustine	Liberal
37th	2000–2004	Jean Augustine	Liberal
38th	2004–2006	Jean Augustine	Liberal
39th	2006–2008	Michael Ignatieff	Liberal
40th	2008–2011	Michael Ignatieff	Liberal
41st	2011–2015	Bernard Trottier	Conservative
42nd	2015–2019	James Maloney	Liberal
43rd	2019–2021	James Maloney	Liberal
44th	2021–2025	James Maloney	Liberal
45th	2025–present	James Maloney	Liberal

== Election results ==
View source data.
Graph of election results in Etobicoke—Lakeshore (minor parties that never got 2% of the vote or didn't run consistently are omitted)

=== Etobicoke—Lakeshore ===
2025 Canadian federal election
Party	Candidate	Votes	%	±%	Expenditures
Liberal	James Maloney	37,512	57.4	+10.2	
Conservative	Bernard Trottier	25,348	38.8	+6.3	
New Democratic	Cory Wagar	1,665	2.5	–11.0	
People's	Thomas Fanjoy	616	0.9	–3.5	
Marxist–Leninist	Janice Murray	197	0.3	+0.1	
Total valid votes/expense limit		65,338	99.4	—	
Total rejected ballots		369	0.6	—	
Turnout		65,707	70.6	+7.5	
Eligible voters		93,139			
Liberal hold		Swing		+2.07	
Source: Elections Canada

2021 federal election redistributed results
Party	Vote	%
Liberal	26,199	47.14
Conservative	18,047	32.47
New Democratic	7,498	13.49
People's	2,445	4.40
Green	1,177	2.12
Others	216	0.39

2021 Canadian federal election
Party	Candidate	Votes	%	±%	Expenditures
Liberal	James Maloney	30,355	47.4	-4.5	$83,584.34
Conservative	Indira Bains	20,457	31.9	+3.2	$119,099.99
New Democratic	Sasha Kane	8,775	13.7	+1.8	$12,774.33
People's	Bill McLachlan	2,857	4.5	+3.2	$0.00
Green	Afam Elue	1,363	2.1	-3.9	$4,336.35
Marxist–Leninist	Anna Di Carlo	139	0.2	±0.0	$0.00
Rhinoceros	Sean Carson	119	0.2	N/A	$0.00
Total valid votes/expense limit		64,065	99.4	–	$128,462.93
Total rejected ballots		397	0.6		
Turnout		64,462	63.1		
Eligible voters		102,151			
Liberal hold		Swing		-3.9	
Source: Elections Canada

2019 Canadian federal election
Party	Candidate	Votes	%	±%	Expenditures
Liberal	James Maloney	36,061	51.88	-1.82	$117,733.35
Conservative	Barry O'Brien	19,952	28.70	-3.75	$107,171.56
New Democratic	Branko Gasperlin	8,277	11.91	+1.01	$19,071.10
Green	Chris Caldwell	4,141	5.96	+3.62	none listed
People's	Jude Sulejmani	921	1.32	-	none listed
Marxist–Leninist	Janice Murray	163	0.23	-0.03	$0.00
Total valid votes/expense limit		69,515	99.25		
Total rejected ballots		525	0.75	+0.28	
Turnout		70,040	67.19	-1.85	
Eligible voters		104,246			
Liberal hold		Swing		+0.96	
Source: Elections Canada

2015 Canadian federal election
Party	Candidate	Votes	%	±%	Expenditures
Liberal	James Maloney	34,638	53.70	+18.60	$154,037.25
Conservative	Bernard Trottier	20,932	32.45	-7.78	$114,083.23
New Democratic	Phil Trotter	7,030	10.90	-9.40	$27,861.80
Green	Angela Salewsky	1,507	2.34	-1.68	$2,045.10
Animal Alliance	Liz White	233	0.36	–	$4,975.83
Marxist–Leninist	Janice Murray	168	0.26	-0.10	–
Total valid votes/expense limit		64,508	99.53		$233,887.62
Total rejected ballots		307	0.47		
Turnout		64,815	69.04		
Eligible voters		93,880			
Liberal gain from Conservative		Swing		+13.19	
Source: Elections Canada

2011 federal election redistributed results
Party	Vote	%
Conservative	20,484	40.23
Liberal	17,867	35.09
New Democratic	10,336	20.30
Green	2,046	4.02
Marxist-Leninist	182	0.36

2011 Canadian federal election
Party	Candidate	Votes	%	±%	Expenditures
Conservative	Bernard Trottier	21,997	40.35	+5.48	$78,142.35
Liberal	Michael Ignatieff	19,128	35.08	-11.05	$68,176.10
New Democratic	Michael Erickson	11,046	20.26	+8.60	$19,716.93
Green	David Corail	2,159	3.96	-3.02	$6,090.24
Marxist–Leninist	Janice Murray	190	0.35	–	–
Total valid votes/expense limit		54,520	100.00	–	$91,715.45
Total rejected ballots		243	0.44	+0.02	
Turnout		54,763	64.02		
Eligible voters		85,547	–	–	

2008 Canadian federal election
Party	Candidate	Votes	%	±%	Expenditures
Liberal	Michael Ignatieff	23,536	46.13	▲2.5	$65,816
Conservative	Patrick Boyer	17,793	34.87	▼0.3	$86,667
New Democratic	Liam McHugh-Russell	5,950	11.66	▼3.9	$20,386
Green	David Corail	3,562	6.98	▲1.9	$946
Marxist–Leninist	Janice Murray	181	0.35	▲0.2	
Total valid votes/expense limit		51,022	100.00	$88,903	
Total rejected ballots		213	0.42		
Turnout		51,235			

2006 Canadian federal election
Party	Candidate	Votes	%	±%
Liberal	Michael Ignatieff	24,337	43.6	▼6.6
Conservative	John Capobianco	19,613	35.2	▲4.6
New Democratic	Liam McHugh-Russell	8,685	15.6	▲1.1
Green	Philip Ridge	2,853	5.1	▲0.7
Communist	Cathy Holliday	186	0.3	
Marxist–Leninist	Janice Murray	104	0.2	▼0.1
Total valid votes		55,778	100.0	

2004 Canadian federal election
Party	Candidate	Votes	%	±%
Liberal	Jean Augustine	24,909	50.2	▼1.5
Conservative	John Capobianco	15,159	30.6	▼10.0
New Democratic	Margaret Anne McHugh	7,179	14.4	▲7.9
Green	John Huculiak	2,201	4.4	
Marxist–Leninist	Janice Murray	129	0.2	0.0
Total valid votes		49,577	100.0	

Note: Conservative vote is compared to the total of the Canadian Alliance vote and Progressive Conservative vote in 2000 election.

2000 Canadian federal election: Etobicoke—Lakeshore
Party	Candidate	Votes	%	±%
Liberal	Jean Augustine	22,467	51.8	▲5.6
Alliance	David Court	9,160	21.1	▲2.1
Progressive Conservative	David Haslam	8,453	19.5	▼3.4
New Democratic	Richard Joseph Banigan	2,835	6.5	▼2.4
Natural Law	Don Jackson	244	0.6	▲0.3
Marxist–Leninist	Janice Murray	116	0.3	0.0
Communist	Ed Bil	113	0.3	
Total valid votes		43,388	100.0	

Note: Canadian Alliance vote is compared to the Reform vote in 1997 election.

1997 Canadian federal election
Party	Candidate	Votes	%	±%
Liberal	Jean Augustine	21,180	46.2	+4.1
Progressive Conservative	Charles Donley	10,509	22.9	-8.0
Reform	Robert Beard	8,697	19.0	+0.2
New Democratic	Karen Ridley	4,085	8.9	+3.9
Canadian Action	Paul Hellyer	770	1.7	
Green	David Burman	315	0.7	
Natural Law	Geraldine Jackson	139	0.3	-0.3
Marxist–Leninist	Barbara Seed	133	0.3	+0.1
Total valid votes		45,828	100.0	

1993 Canadian federal election
Party	Candidate	Votes	%	±%
Liberal	Jean Augustine	19,458	42.1	
Progressive Conservative	Patrick Boyer	14,306	31.0	-15.1
Reform	Ken Anstruther	8,693	18.8	
New Democratic	Karen Ridley	2,316	5.0	-39.2
National	Gilles Brunet	861	1.9	
Natural Law	Don Jackson	283	0.6	
Libertarian	Alan D'Orsay	197	0.4	-6.6
Marxist–Leninist	Julie Northrup	78	0.2	
Abolitionist	Michael McCabe	2	0.0	
Total valid votes		46,194	100.0	

1988 Canadian federal election
Party	Candidate	Votes	%	±%
Progressive Conservative	Patrick Boyer	20,405	46.0	+1.3
New Democratic	Judy Brandow	19,609	44.2	+20.5
Libertarian	Daniel Hunt	3,097	7.0	+6.3
Green	Dan Freeman	679	1.5	
Independent	Françoise Roy	393	0.9	
Communist	Vicky Holloway	141	0.3	-0.2
Total valid votes		44,324	100.0	

1984 Canadian federal election
Party	Candidate	Votes	%	±%
Progressive Conservative	Patrick Boyer	19,902	44.8	+14.7
Liberal	Ken Robinson	13,455	30.3	-10.5
New Democratic	Pat Lawlor	10,549	23.7	-4.6
Libertarian	Monica Cain	317	0.7	+0.2
Communist	Peter Boychuck	216	0.5	
Total valid votes		44,439	100.0	

1980 Canadian federal election: Etobicoke—Lakeshore
Party	Candidate	Votes	%	±%
Liberal	Ken Robinson	17,903	40.8	+6.1
Progressive Conservative	Al Kolyn	13,209	30.1	-3.0
New Democratic	Terry Meagher	12,405	28.3	-2.6
Libertarian	Stephen Kimish	247	0.6	-0.2
Marxist–Leninist	Diane Waldman	88	0.2	0.0
Total valid votes		43,852	100.0	
lop.parl.ca

1979 Canadian federal election
Party	Candidate	Votes	%	±%
Liberal	Ken Robinson	15,791	34.7	-5.4
Progressive Conservative	Al Kolyn	15,044	33.1	+9.2
New Democratic	Terry Meagher	14,044	30.9	-4.5
Libertarian	Sheldon Gold	349	0.8	
Communist	Tom Morris	169	0.4	0.0
Marxist–Leninist	Diane Waldman	72	0.2	0.0
Total valid votes		45,469	100.0	

=== Toronto—Lakeshore ===
1974 Canadian federal election
Party	Candidate	Votes	%	±%
Liberal	Ken Robinson	14,241	40.1	+4.2
New Democratic	Terry Grier	12,584	35.4	-4.0
Progressive Conservative	Jim Muir	8,475	23.9	-0.2
Communist	Ginny Thomson	145	0.4	
Marxist–Leninist	Paul Herman	68	0.2	
Total valid votes		35,513	100.0	

1972 Canadian federal election
Party	Candidate	Votes	%	±%
New Democratic	Terry Grier	14,722	39.4	+2.6
Liberal	Ken Robinson	13,393	35.9	-7.2
Progressive Conservative	Dmytro Kupiak	9,004	24.1	+3.9
Independent	Gordon Massie	124	0.3	
Independent	George Bedard	102	0.3	
Total valid votes		37,345	100.0	

=== Lakeshore ===
1968 Canadian federal election: Lakeshore
Party	Candidate	Votes	%
Liberal	Ken Robinson	14,464	43.0
New Democratic	Terry Grier	12,367	36.8
Progressive Conservative	Stuart Summerhayes	6,794	20.2
Total valid votes		33,625	100.0

== See also ==
- List of Canadian electoral districts
- Historical federal electoral districts of Canada
