= Christine Hogarth =

Canadian politician

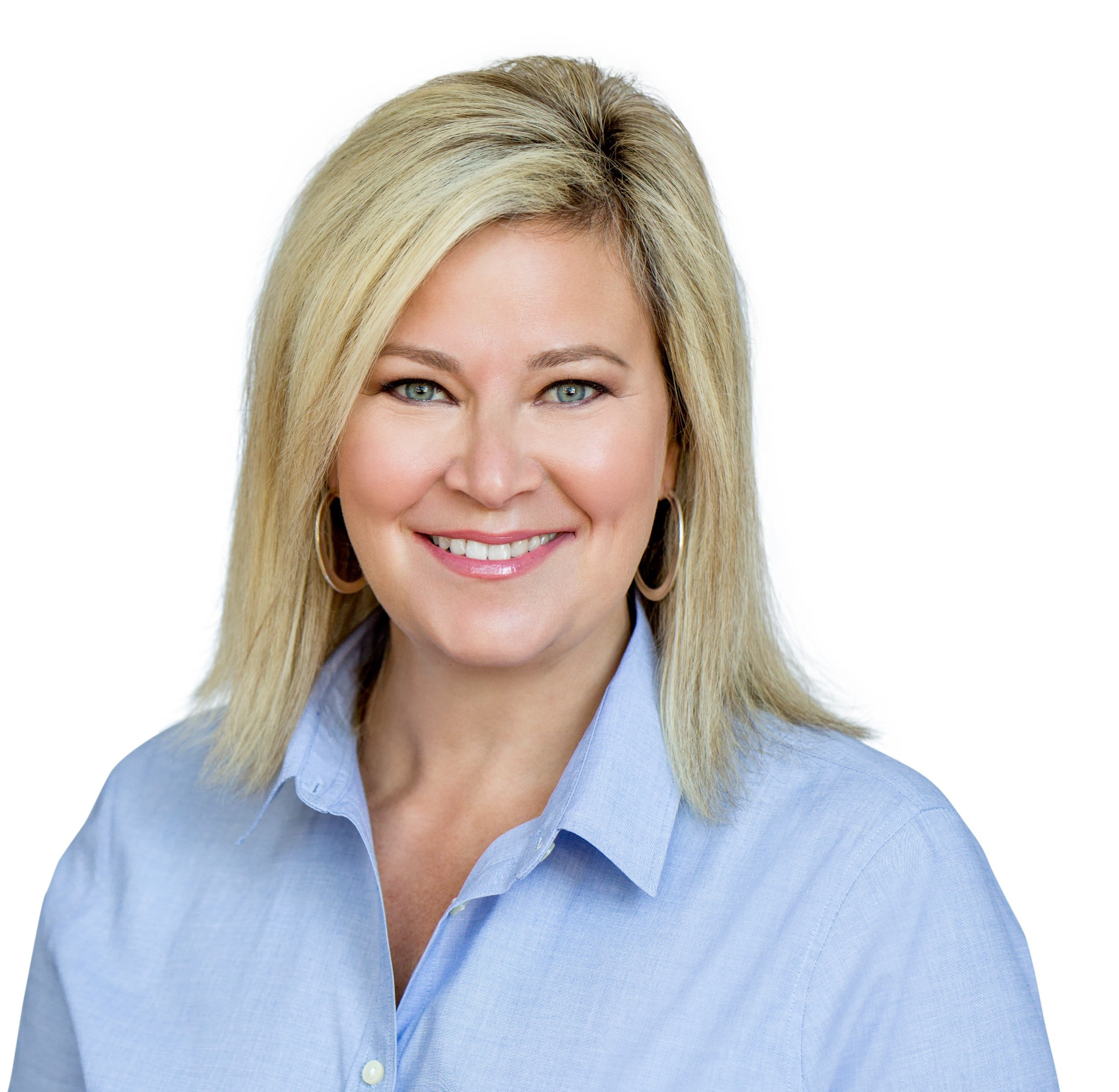

Parliamentary Assistant to the Solicitor General (Community Safety)
- In office June 26, 2019 – January 28, 2025
- Minister: Sylvia Jones

Member of the Ontario Provincial Parliament for Etobicoke—Lakeshore
- In office June 7, 2018 – January 28, 2025
- Preceded by: Peter Milczyn
- Succeeded by: Lee Fairclough

Personal details
- Party: Progressive Conservative
- Other political affiliations: Conservative (federal)
- Education: Lake Superior State University (BSc)
- Occupation: Political Staffer

Christine C. G. Hogarth is a Canadian politician, who was a member of the Legislative Assembly of Ontario first elected in the 2018 provincial election. She represented the electoral district of Etobicoke—Lakeshore as a member of the Progressive Conservative Party until her defeat in the 2025 Ontario general election.

== Early life and education ==
Hogarth has a bachelor of science degree in political science and public administration. She is the daughter of Marlene Hogarth and William Donald Hogarth, who served as a municipal councillor in Shuniah.

== Career ==
Hogarth was chief of staff to John Tory when he headed the Progressive Conservative Party of Ontario. She was twice elected to the party executive and served as its first female executive director and held two elected positions on the party executive. Hogarth was policy adviser to Chris Hodgson when he was Minister of Northern Development and Mines, Minister of Natural Resources and Chair of Management Board of Cabinet. Hogarth also worked for two Ontario Premiers. She worked as the Director of Events for the Toronto Board of Trade and as a government relations manager with the Canadian Automobile Association. Within government, she was the Queen's Park staffer in Patrick Brown's office, an executive assistant to the Ward 4 Councillor John Campbell in Etobicoke, and from 2011 to 2014 chief of staff for the mayor of Greater Sudbury, Marianne Matichuk.

In 2017 she declared her candidacy for the Etobicoke—Lakeshore seat in the Legislative Assembly of Ontario, against the incumbent, Peter Milczyn. She received the endorsement of Patrick Brown, then-leader the Ontario Progressive Conservative Party.

On June 29, 2018, Hogarth was appointed as Parliamentary Assistant to the Minister of Municipal Affairs and Housing, with a responsibility for the Housing portfolio.

She was re-elected in the 2022 Ontario general election. She lost her seat in the 2025 Ontario general election.

=== Election results ===
2022 Ontario general election: Etobicoke—Lakeshore
Party	Candidate	Votes	%	±%	Expenditures
Progressive Conservative	Christine Hogarth	17,978	37.48	–0.87	$75,837
Liberal	Lee Fairclough	17,136	35.73	+11.48	$88,272
New Democratic	Farheen Alim	8,595	17.92	–14.97	$68,196
Green	Thomas Yanuziello	2,278	4.75	+1.13	$1,471
New Blue	Mary Markovic	1,612	3.36	–	$4,739
Independent	Bill Denning	186	0.39	–	$460
None of the Above	Vitas Naudziunas	181	0.38	–	$0
Total valid votes		47,966	99.47	–	$149,099
Total rejected, unmarked and declined ballots		255	0.53	–0.40	
Turnout		48,221	45.28	–13.33	
Eligible voters		106,499			
Progressive Conservative hold		Swing		▼6.17	
Source: Elections Ontario

2018 Ontario general election: Etobicoke—Lakeshore
Party	Candidate	Votes	%	±%
Progressive Conservative	Christine Hogarth	22,626	38.35	+4.25
New Democratic	Phil Trotter	19,401	32.89	+20.36
Liberal	Peter Milczyn	14,305	24.25	–23.34
Green	Chris Caldwell	2,138	3.62	–0.47
Libertarian	Mark Wrzesniewski	360	0.61	–
Moderate	Ian Lytvyn	163	0.28	–
Total valid votes		58,993	99.07	
Total rejected, unmarked and declined ballots		554	0.93	
Turnout		59,547	58.61	
Eligible voters		101,606		
Progressive Conservative notional gain from Liberal		Swing		–8.06
Source: Elections Ontario
