= Etobicoke—Lakeshore (provincial electoral district) =

Provincial electoral district in Ontario, Canada

Coordinates: 43.61°N 79.54°W

Ontario electoral district
- Location in Toronto

Provincial electoral district
- Legislature: Legislative Assembly of Ontario
MPP
Lee Fairclough
Liberal
- District created: 1987
- First contested: 1987
- Last contested: 2025

Demographics
- Population (2016): 129,080
- Electors (2018): 101,606
- Area (km²): 51
- Pop. density (per km²): 2,531
- Census division: Toronto
- Census subdivision: Toronto

Etobicoke—Lakeshore is a provincial electoral district in Toronto, Ontario, Canada. It elects one member to the Legislative Assembly of Ontario. It was created in 1987 from Lakeshore.

From 1987 to 1999 the district included all of Etobicoke south of a line following the CP Railway to Kipling Avenue to Bloor Street.

In 1999 the border was moved up to a line following Dundas Street to the 427 to Burnhamthorpe Road to Kipling Avenue to Mimico Creek to the Canadian Pacific Railway to Dundas Street.

== Members of Provincial Parliament ==
Etobicoke—Lakeshore
Assembly	Years	Member	Party
Riding created from Lakeshore
34th	1987–1990	Ruth Grier	New Democratic
35th	1990–1995	Ruth Grier	New Democratic
36th	1995–1999	Morley Kells	Progressive Conservative
37th	1999–2003	Morley Kells	Progressive Conservative
38th	2003–2007	Laurel Broten	Liberal
39th	2007–2011	Laurel Broten	Liberal
40th	2011–2013	Laurel Broten	Liberal
40th	2013–2014	Doug Holyday	Progressive Conservative
41st	2014–2018	Peter Milczyn	Liberal
42nd	2018–2022	Christine Hogarth	Progressive Conservative
43rd	2022–2025	Christine Hogarth	Progressive Conservative
44th	2025–present	Lee Fairclough	Liberal
Sourced from the Ontario Legislative Assembly

== Election results ==
Winning party in each polling division of Etobicoke—Lakeshore at the 2025 Ontario general election

2025 Ontario general election
Party	Candidate	Votes	%	±%
Liberal	Lee Fairclough	25,195	48.52	+12.80
Progressive Conservative	Christine Hogarth	21,050	40.54	+3.06
New Democratic	Rozhen Asrani	3,640	7.01	–10.91
Green	Sean McClocklin	1,218	2.35	–2.40
New Blue	Tony Siskos	452	0.87	–2.49
Moderate	Larisa Berson	204	0.39	–
None of the Above	Vitas Naudziunas	165	0.32	–0.06
Total valid votes		51,924	99.30	
Total rejected, unmarked and declined ballots		365	0.70	+0.17
Turnout		52,289	46.75	+1.47
Eligible voters		111,858		
Liberal gain from Progressive Conservative		Swing		+4.87
Source: Elections Ontario

Winning party in each polling division of Etobicoke—Lakeshore at the 2022 Ontario general election

2022 Ontario general election
Party	Candidate	Votes	%	±%	Expenditures
Progressive Conservative	Christine Hogarth	17,978	37.48	–0.87	$75,837
Liberal	Lee Fairclough	17,136	35.73	+11.48	$88,272
New Democratic	Farheen Alim	8,595	17.92	–14.97	$68,196
Green	Thomas Yanuziello	2,278	4.75	+1.13	$1,471
New Blue	Mary Markovic	1,612	3.36	–	$4,739
Independent	Bill Denning	186	0.39	–	$460
None of the Above	Vitas Naudziunas	181	0.38	–	$0
Total valid votes		47,966	99.47	–	$149,099
Total rejected, unmarked and declined ballots		255	0.53	–0.40	
Turnout		48,221	45.28	–13.33	
Eligible voters		106,499			
Progressive Conservative hold		Swing		–6.17	
Source: Elections Ontario

2018 Ontario general election
Party	Candidate	Votes	%	±%
Progressive Conservative	Christine Hogarth	22,626	38.35	+4.25
New Democratic	Phil Trotter	19,401	32.89	+20.36
Liberal	Peter Milczyn	14,305	24.25	–23.34
Green	Chris Caldwell	2,138	3.62	–0.47
Libertarian	Mark Wrzesniewski	360	0.61	–
Moderate	Ian Lytvyn	163	0.28	–
Total valid votes		58,993	99.07	
Total rejected, unmarked and declined ballots		554	0.93	
Turnout		59,547	58.61	
Eligible voters		101,606		
Progressive Conservative notional gain from Liberal		Swing		–8.06
Source: Elections Ontario

2014 general election redistributed results
Party	Vote	%
Liberal	22,916	47.59
Progressive Conservative	16,420	34.10
New Democratic	6,032	12.53
Green	1,971	4.09
Others	817	1.70

2014 Ontario general election
Party	Candidate	Votes	%	±%
Liberal	Peter Milczyn	24,311	47.49	+5.19
Progressive Conservative	Doug Holyday	17,587	34.35	–12.40
New Democratic	P. C. Choo	6,362	12.43	+5.02
Green	Angela Salewsky	2,064	4.03	+1.78
Libertarian	Mark Wrzesniewski	336	0.66	+0.21
Socialist	Natalie Lochwin	236	0.46	–
Freedom	Jeff Merklinger	189	0.37	+0.24
Moderate	Ian Lytvyn	108	0.21	–
Total valid votes		51,193	98.94	
Total rejected, unmarked and declined ballots		548	1.06	+0.44
Turnout		51,741	53.73	+15.77
Eligible voters		96,304		
Liberal gain from Progressive Conservative		Swing		+8.80
Source: Elections Ontario

Ontario provincial by-election, August 1, 2013 Resignation of Laurel Broten
Party	Candidate	Votes	%	±%
Progressive Conservative	Doug Holyday	16,034	46.75	+17.51
Liberal	Peter Milczyn	14,506	42.30	–8.73
New Democratic	P. C. Choo	2,542	7.41	–8.04
Green	Angela Salewsky	771	2.25	–0.43
Special Needs	Dan King	157	0.46	–
Libertarian	Hans Kunov	152	0.44	+0.05
People's Political Party	Kevin Clarke	87	0.25	–
Freedom	Wayne Simmons	46	0.13	–0.27
Total valid votes		34,295	99.38	
Total rejected, unmarked and declined ballots		214	0.62	+0.04
Turnout		34,509	37.95	–12.06
Eligible voters		90,927		
Progressive Conservative gain from Liberal		Swing		+13.12
Source: Elections Ontario Police detective Steve Ryan had originally been nominated by the Progressive Conservatives, however, according to party leader Tim Hudak, Ryan was unable to run in the by-election due to injuries sustained in a work related automobile accident; city councillor Doug Holyday was recruited to be the party's candidate instead.

2011 Ontario general election
Party	Candidate	Votes	%	±%
Liberal	Laurel Broten	22,169	51.02	+5.03
Progressive Conservative	Simon Nyilassy	12,705	29.24	–1.43
New Democratic	Dionne Coley	6,713	15.45	+2.17
Green	Angela Salewsky	1,164	2.68	–5.21
Freedom	Mark Brombacher	174	0.40	–
Libertarian	Hans Kunov	172	0.40	–
Socialist	Natalie Lochwin	125	0.29	–
Independent	Thane C. MacKay	113	0.26	–
Independent	John Letonja	113	0.26	–
Total valid votes		43,448	99.42	
Total rejected, unmarked and declined ballots		255	0.58	–0.31
Turnout		43,703	50.01	–3.61
Eligible voters		87,390		
Liberal hold		Swing		+3.23
Source: Elections Ontario

2007 Ontario general election
Party	Candidate	Votes	%	±%
Liberal	Laurel Broten	20,218	45.99	+1.83
Progressive Conservative	Tom Barlow	13,482	30.67	–1.92
New Democratic	Andrew Németh	5,837	13.28	–6.81
Green	Jerry Schulman	3,467	7.89	+6.30
Independent	Janice Murray	480	1.09	+0.59
Family Coalition	Robert Williams	478	1.09	+0.01
Total valid votes		43,962	99.11	
Total rejected, unmarked and declined ballots		397	0.90	+0.37
Turnout		44,359	53.62	–5.90
Eligible voters		82,728		
Liberal hold		Swing		+1.88
Source: Elections Ontario

2003 Ontario general election
Party	Candidate	Votes	%	±%
Liberal	Laurel Broten	19,680	44.16	+8.30
Progressive Conservative	Morley Kells	14,524	32.59	–14.39
New Democratic	Irene Jones	8,952	20.09	+5.36
Green	Junyee Wang	708	1.59	–
Family Coalition	Ted Kupiec	480	1.08	+0.11
Independent	Janice Murray	225	0.50	–0.18
Total valid votes		44,569	99.47	
Total rejected, unmarked and declined ballots		237	0.53	–0.66
Turnout		44,806	59.52	–0.82
Eligible voters		75,279		
Liberal gain from Progressive Conservative		Swing		+11.35
Source: Elections Ontario

1999 Ontario general election
Party	Candidate	Votes	%	±%
Progressive Conservative	Morley Kells	20,602	46.98	+1.75
Liberal	Laurel Broten	15,723	35.85	+8.27
New Democratic	Vicki Obedkoff	6,457	14.72	–10.44
Family Coalition	Kevin McGourty	423	0.96	–
Natural Law	Don Jackson	349	0.80	+0.16
Independent	Janice Murray	299	0.68	–
Total valid votes		43,853	98.81	
Total rejected, unmarked and declined ballots		527	1.19	–0.11
Turnout		44,380	60.34	–6.21
Eligible voters		73,551		
Progressive Conservative hold		Swing		–3.26
Source: Elections Ontario

1995 Ontario general election
Party	Candidate	Votes	%	±%
Progressive Conservative	Morley Kells	14,879	45.23	+29.90
Liberal	Bruce Davis	9,074	27.58	+5.45
New Democratic	Ruth Grier	8,279	25.17	–32.06
Libertarian	Daniel Hunt	270	0.82	–
Natural Law	Geraldine Jackson	209	0.64	–
Independent	Julie Northrup	186	0.57	–
Total valid votes		32,897	98.71	
Total rejected, unmarked and declined ballots		431	1.29	–0.19
Turnout		33,328	66.55	+0.40
Eligible voters		50,083		
Progressive Conservative gain from New Democratic		Swing		+12.22
Source: Elections Ontario

1990 Ontario general election
Party	Candidate	Votes	%	±%
New Democratic	Ruth Grier	18,118	57.23	+12.64
Liberal	Sam Shephard	7,006	22.13	–15.34
Progressive Conservative	Jeff Knoll	4,854	15.33	+1.01
Family Coalition	Trish O'Connor	1,053	3.33	–0.29
Green	Phaedra Livingstone	629	1.99	–
Total valid votes		31,660	98.52	
Total rejected, unmarked and declined ballots		477	1.48	+0.79
Turnout		32,137	66.15	+0.38
Eligible voters		48,584		
New Democratic hold		Swing		+13.99
Source: Elections Ontario

1987 Ontario general election
Party	Candidate	Votes	%
New Democratic	Ruth Grier	14,821	44.59
Liberal	Frank Sgarlata	12,454	37.47
Progressive Conservative	Al Kolyn	4,760	14.32
Family Coalition	Michael Doyle	1,203	3.62
Total valid votes		33,238	99.31
Total rejected ballots		232	0.69
Turnout		33,470	65.76
Eligible voters		50,895	
New Democratic pickup new district.			
Source: Elections Ontario

== 2007 electoral reform referendum ==
2007 Ontario electoral reform referendum
Side	Votes	%
First Past the Post	25,800	60.8
Mixed member proportional	16,658	39.2
Total valid votes	42,458	100.0

== See also ==
- List of Ontario provincial electoral districts
- Canadian provincial electoral districts
