= Lee Fairclough =

Canadian politician (born 1973)

Lee Fairclough MPP
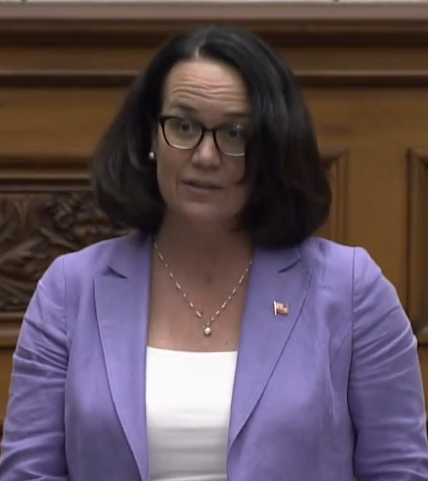
- Fairclough in 2025

Member of the Ontario Provincial Parliament for Etobicoke—Lakeshore
- Incumbent
- Assumed office February 27, 2025
- Preceded by: Christine Hogarth

Personal details
- Born: June 2, 1973 (age 53)
- Party: Ontario Liberal
- Education: McMaster University (BSc); University of Waterloo (MRTT); University of Toronto (MHSc)
- Occupation: Politician; Health administrator
- Website: Constituency website; Campaign website

Lee Fairclough MPP (born June 2, 1973) is a Canadian politician who has served as the member of Provincial Parliament (MPP) for Etobicoke—Lakeshore since 2025. A member of the Ontario Liberal Party, she was a candidate in the 2026 Ontario Liberal Party leadership election.

Before entering politics, Fairclough worked for more than two decades in Ontario's health system as a medical radiation therapist, hospital executive, and health-quality leader, including as president of St. Mary's General Hospital in Kitchener (2019–2022) and as senior vice-president of clinical care at the Centre for Addiction and Mental Health (CAMH). Since September 2025 she has served as the Liberal critic for hospitals, mental health, and addictions and homelessness.

== Early life and education ==
Fairclough's parents, Valerie and Neville Fairclough, immigrated to Canada from England in 1967. They first settled in Etobicoke, then moved to Southampton, Ontario, on the shore of Lake Huron during Fairclough's pre-teen years, before moving to Scarborough, Ontario, where she attended Sir Wilfrid Laurier Collegiate Institute.

Valerie Fairclough taught high school art and English while Neville Fairclough worked as an engineer on nuclear projects for Ontario Hydro. In her inaugural speech, Fairclough said her father eventually led construction of the Darlington Nuclear Generating Station.

Fairclough has a Master's degree in Health Sciences (MHSc) from the University of Toronto, an undergraduate degree in biology and mathematics (BSc) from McMaster University, and is a certified Medical Radiation Therapy Technologist (MRTT) trained at the University of Waterloo. She is an adjunct professor at the University of Toronto, Institute of Health Policy, Management and Evaluation.

Fairclough was a competitive swimmer for many years including as a Varsity Swimmer for McMaster. After university, Fairclough was a member of the Canada women's national rugby union team from 1995 to 1998. She represented Canada at the 1998 Women's Rugby World Cup in Amsterdam.

Since 2001, Fairclough has lived in Etobicoke—Lakeshore, where she and her husband raise two children.

== Career ==
She began her medical career as a medical radiation therapist at Princess Margaret Cancer Centre, subsequently moving to several roles within Princess Margaret and the University Health Network. She moved to Health Quality Ontario in 2014 as vice president of quality improvement, and in 2018 also served as interim executive lead to establish the newly announced Mental Health and Addictions Centre of Excellence.

She was appointed president of St. Mary's General Hospital in Kitchener in 2019. She stepped down from that job to run in Etobicoke—Lakeshore in the 2022 Ontario general election. She subsequently served as senior vice-president of clinical care at the Centre for Addiction and Mental Health until the 2025 election when she ran again in Etobicoke—Lakeshore defeating Hogarth.

== Political career ==
=== 2022 and 2025 elections ===
Fairclough first sought election in Etobicoke—Lakeshore in the 2022 Ontario general election, resigning as president of St. Mary's to run. She was defeated by Progressive Conservative incumbent Christine Hogarth, despite an endorsement from the Not One Seat movement.

She ran again in the 2025 Ontario general election and defeated Hogarth, taking the seat with 25,195 votes (48.5 percent). During the campaign she was endorsed by the Ontario Secondary School Teachers' Federation (OSSTF/FEESO).

=== Legislative roles ===
Fairclough has served on the Standing Committee on Public Accounts since April 29, 2025, and as second vice-chair since May 5, 2025.

On September 2, 2025, she was appointed Ontario Liberal critic for hospitals, mental health, and addictions and homelessness.

In the 44th Parliament she has sponsored or co-sponsored private members' legislation including the Homelessness Ends with Housing Act, 2025 (Bill 28) and the Stop Harmful Gambling Advertising Act, 2026 (Bill 107).

=== 2026 leadership campaign ===
On May 8, 2026, Fairclough announced her candidacy in the 2026 Ontario Liberal Party leadership election, campaigning under the slogan "Fighting for a Better Ontario". Media coverage has noted that she is among the candidates already serving as an MPP at Queen's Park. She was narrowly defeated by Navdeep Bains.

At launch she had the support of caucus colleagues Ted Hsu and Lucille Collard, and of former deputy premier Deb Matthews. In May 2026, Stephanie Smyth endorsed Fairclough, joining Hsu and Collard among Liberal MPPs backing her bid; Tyler Watt later became a fourth caucus endorser.

== Awards ==
Fairclough was presented with the University of Toronto Arbor Award in 2019, a recognition "given to individuals who are exemplary in their dedication and service to the community."

In 2022, Fairclough was awarded the YWCA Cambridge Women of Distinction Awards' "The Courage of COVID" for her role at St. Mary's Hospital managing the COVID-19 pandemic in her region.

== Electoral record ==
2025 Ontario general election
Party	Candidate	Votes	%	±%	Expenditures
Liberal	Lee Fairclough	25,195	48.5	+12.8	$116,832
Progressive Conservative	Christine Hogarth	21,050	40.5	+3.0	$57,177
New Democratic	Rozhen Asrani	3,640	7.0	–10.9	$49,230
Green	Sean McClocklin	1,218	2.4	–2.5	$0
New Blue	Tony Siskos	452	0.9	–2.5	$0
Moderate	Larisa Berson	204	0.4	N/A	$0
None of the Above	Vitas Naudziunas	165	0.3	–0.1	$0
Total valid votes/expense limit		51,924	99.3	–0.17	$180,091
Total rejected, unmarked, and declined ballots		365	0.70	–0.17	
Turnout		52,289	46.75	+1.4	
Eligible voters		111,858			
Liberal gain from Progressive Conservative		Swing		+4.9	
Source: Elections Ontario

2022 Ontario general election: Etobicoke—Lakeshore
Party	Candidate	Votes	%	±%	Expenditures
Progressive Conservative	Christine Hogarth	17,978	37.48	–0.87	$75,837
Liberal	Lee Fairclough	17,136	35.73	+11.48	$88,272
New Democratic	Farheen Alim	8,595	17.92	–14.97	$68,196
Green	Thomas Yanuziello	2,278	4.75	+1.13	$1,471
New Blue	Mary Markovic	1,612	3.36	–	$4,739
Independent	Bill Denning	186	0.39	–	$460
None of the Above	Vitas Naudziunas	181	0.38	–	$0
Total valid votes		47,966	99.47	–	$149,099
Total rejected, unmarked and declined ballots		255	0.53	–0.40	
Turnout		48,221	45.28	–13.33	
Eligible voters		106,499			
Progressive Conservative hold		Swing		▼6.17	
Source: Elections Ontario
