= Bernard Trottier =

Canadian politician

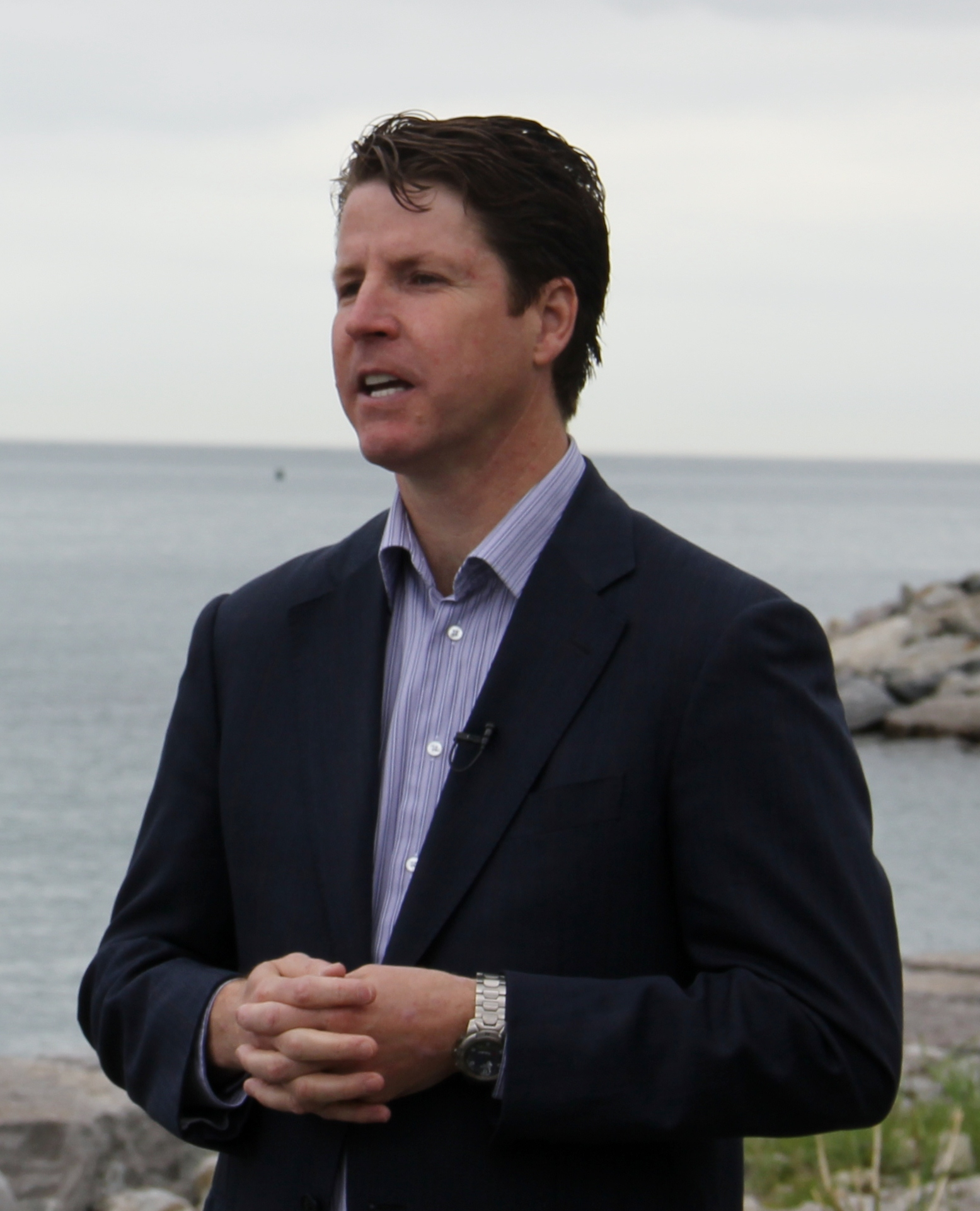
- Trottier in 2013

Member of the Canadian Parliament for Etobicoke—Lakeshore
- In office May 2, 2011 – August 4, 2015
- Preceded by: Michael Ignatieff
- Succeeded by: James Maloney

Personal details
- Born: March 13, 1965 (age 61) St. Paul, Alberta, Canada
- Party: Conservative
- Spouse: Susan Schutta
- Children: Alexandre, Zoë
- Education: University of Alberta; University of Western Ontario
- Profession: Management Consultant

Bernard Trottier (born March 13, 1965) is a Canadian politician. He was a Conservative Party member House of Commons of Canada who served from 2011 to 2015 representing the Toronto riding of Etobicoke—Lakeshore. Trottier was elected in the 2011 federal election when he defeated the Leader of the Liberal Party, Michael Ignatieff, who was also the Leader of the Official Opposition.

In February 2015, Trottier was appointed Parliamentary Secretary to the Minister of Foreign Affairs and for La Francophonie. Previously, he was appointed Parliamentary Secretary to the Minister of Public Works and Government Services in September 2013.

== Early years and education ==
Born and raised in St. Paul, Alberta, he was born to Dr. Léon Trottier and artist Terry Trottier. After graduating from St. Paul Regional High School in 1983, Bernard Trottier went on to earn his B.Sc.Eng. from the University of Alberta in 1988 and his M.B.A. from the Richard Ivey School of Business at the University of Western Ontario in 1992. He also attended l'École des Hautes Études Commerciales, l'Université de Montréal/École Polytechnique de Montréal, and the University of Ottawa.

== Business career and community activities ==
Since graduating from the University of Western Ontario in 1992, Trottier has resided in Toronto. Trottier was a management consultant in the Toronto area before joining IBM Global Business Services as a senior consulting manager, a job he held at the time he was elected to Parliament. He previously served as the President of the Etobicoke—Lakeshore Conservative Association and of the Sunnylea Co-operative Nursery School. He also volunteered as a coach in the Royal York Baseball League and the Islington Rangers Soccer League.

== Entry into politics ==
In the 2011 federal election, Trottier won the Toronto riding of Etobicoke—Lakeshore, defeating Leader of the Liberal Party, Michael Ignatieff, who was also the incumbent Leader of the Official Opposition. The Liberal Party had held 20 of the 22 Toronto ridings prior to the election.

Trottier was initially considered a sacrificial lamb candidate; even he initially didn't expect to win. However, he benefited from a collapse in Liberal support in Toronto which saw the Conservatives claim a total of eight seats in the city. He also benefited from the endorsement of Toronto Mayor and Etobicoke resident Rob Ford. Voters were reportedly also concerned that Ignatieff might resign in the event the Liberals didn't do well. Reports suggested that Ignatieff had initially promised to move into a home inside his riding, but instead he resided in the Downtown Toronto neighbourhood of Yorkville, which rankled Etobicoke—Lakeshore residents and reinforced perceptions of Ignatieff's political opportunism.

Trottier was defeated by Liberal James Maloney in the 2015 election, taking 32 percent of the vote amid the Liberal wave that swept through Toronto.

=== Electoral record ===
2025 Canadian federal election: Etobicoke—Lakeshore
Party	Candidate	Votes	%	±%	Expenditures
Liberal	James Maloney	37,512	57.4	+10.2	
Conservative	Bernard Trottier	25,348	38.8	+6.3	
New Democratic	Cory Wagar	1,665	2.5	–11.0	
People's	Thomas Fanjoy	616	0.9	–3.5	
Marxist–Leninist	Janice Murray	197	0.3	+0.1	
Total valid votes/expense limit		65,338	99.4	—	
Total rejected ballots		369	0.6	—	
Turnout		65,707	70.6	+7.5	
Eligible voters		93,139			
Liberal hold		Swing		+2.07	
Source: Elections Canada

2015 Canadian federal election: Etobicoke—Lakeshore
Party	Candidate	Votes	%	±%	Expenditures
Liberal	James Maloney	34,638	53.70	+18.60	$154,037.25
Conservative	Bernard Trottier	20,932	32.45	-7.78	$114,083.23
New Democratic	Phil Trotter	7,030	10.90	-9.40	$27,861.80
Green	Angela Salewsky	1,507	2.34	-1.68	$2,045.10
Animal Alliance	Liz White	233	0.36	–	$4,975.83
Marxist–Leninist	Janice Murray	168	0.26	-0.10	–
Total valid votes/expense limit		64,508	99.53		$233,887.62
Total rejected ballots		307	0.47		
Turnout		64,815	69.04		
Eligible voters		93,880			
Liberal gain from Conservative		Swing		+13.19	
Source: Elections Canada

2011 Canadian federal election: Etobicoke—Lakeshore
Party	Candidate	Votes	%	±%	Expenditures
Conservative	Bernard Trottier	21,997	40.35	+5.48	$78,142.35
Liberal	Michael Ignatieff	19,128	35.08	-11.05	$68,176.10
New Democratic	Michael Erickson	11,046	20.26	+8.60	$19,716.93
Green	David Corail	2,159	3.96	-3.02	$6,090.24
Marxist–Leninist	Janice Murray	190	0.35	–	–
Total valid votes/expense limit		54,520	100.00	–	$91,715.45
Total rejected ballots		243	0.44	+0.02	
Turnout		54,763	64.02		
Eligible voters		85,547	–	–	

== Personal life ==
A Franco-Albertan, Trottier is fluently bilingual in French and English. He and his wife, Susan Schutta, live in Etobicoke with their two children.
