= Ken Robinson (Canadian politician) =

Canadian politician (1927–1991)

William Kenneth Robinson

Member of Parliament for Etobicoke-Lakeshore
- In office 1979–1984
- Preceded by: Riding established
- Succeeded by: Patrick Boyer

Member of Parliament for Toronto-Lakeshore
- In office 1974–1979
- Preceded by: Terry Grier
- Succeeded by: Riding abolished

Member of Parliament for Lakeshore
- In office 1968–1972
- Preceded by: Riding established
- Succeeded by: Terry Grier

Personal details
- Born: 16 July 1927 Toronto, Ontario, Canada
- Died: 31 December 1991 (aged 64)
- Party: Liberal
- Profession: Lawyer

William Kenneth Robinson (16 July 1927 – 31 December 1991) was a Canadian lawyer, barrister and Liberal Member of Parliament from 1968 to 1972, and from 1974 to 1984.

A native of Toronto, Ontario, Ken Robinson was elected in the riding of Lakeshore in 1968, lost in the renamed riding of Toronto—Lakeshore to the New Democratic Party candidate in 1972, but was re-elected in 1974, won a third term in the same riding, renamed again to Etobicoke—Lakeshore in 1979, and re-elected to a fourth term in 1980.

Ken Robinson served as:

- Parliamentary Secretary to the Minister of National Health and Welfare, 1977–1979
- Parliamentary Secretary to the Minister of Justice and Attorney General of Canada, 1980
- Parliamentary Secretary to the Minister of State for Social Development, 1980
- Parliamentary Secretary to the Minister of National Revenue, 1984

Ken Robinson lost his seat in the 1984 election and, seven years later, died at the age of sixty four.

== Electoral record ==
1984 Canadian federal election: Etobicoke—Lakeshore
Party	Candidate	Votes	%	±%
Progressive Conservative	Patrick Boyer	19,902	44.8	+14.7
Liberal	Ken Robinson	13,455	30.3	-10.5
New Democratic	Pat Lawlor	10,549	23.7	-4.6
Libertarian	Monica Cain	317	0.7	+0.2
Communist	Peter Boychuck	216	0.5	
Total valid votes		44,439	100.0	

1980 Canadian federal election: Etobicoke—Lakeshore
Party	Candidate	Votes	%	±%
Liberal	Ken Robinson	17,903	40.8	+6.1
Progressive Conservative	Al Kolyn	13,209	30.1	-3.0
New Democratic	Terry Meagher	12,405	28.3	-2.6
Libertarian	Stephen Kimish	247	0.6	-0.2
Marxist–Leninist	Diane Waldman	88	0.2	0.0
Total valid votes		43,852	100.0	
lop.parl.ca

1979 Canadian federal election: Etobicoke—Lakeshore
Party	Candidate	Votes	%	±%
Liberal	Ken Robinson	15,791	34.7	-5.4
Progressive Conservative	Al Kolyn	15,044	33.1	+9.2
New Democratic	Terry Meagher	14,044	30.9	-4.5
Libertarian	Sheldon Gold	349	0.8	
Communist	Tom Morris	169	0.4	0.0
Marxist–Leninist	Diane Waldman	72	0.2	0.0
Total valid votes		45,469	100.0	

1974 Canadian federal election: Toronto—Lakeshore
Party	Candidate	Votes	%	±%
Liberal	Ken Robinson	14,241	40.1	+4.2
New Democratic	Terry Grier	12,584	35.4	-4.0
Progressive Conservative	Jim Muir	8,475	23.9	-0.2
Communist	Ginny Thomson	145	0.4	
Marxist–Leninist	Paul Herman	68	0.2	
Total valid votes		35,513	100.0	

1972 Canadian federal election: Toronto—Lakeshore
Party	Candidate	Votes	%	±%
New Democratic	Terry Grier	14,722	39.4	+2.6
Liberal	Ken Robinson	13,393	35.9	-7.2
Progressive Conservative	Dmytro Kupiak	9,004	24.1	+3.9
Independent	Gordon Massie	124	0.3	
Independent	George Bedard	102	0.3	
Total valid votes		37,345	100.0	

1968 Canadian federal election: Lakeshore
Party	Candidate	Votes	%
Liberal	Ken Robinson	14,464	43.0
New Democratic	Terry Grier	12,367	36.8
Progressive Conservative	Stuart Summerhayes	6,794	20.2
Total valid votes		33,625	100.0
