= James Maloney (Canadian politician) =

Canadian politician (born 1964)

James Maloney MP
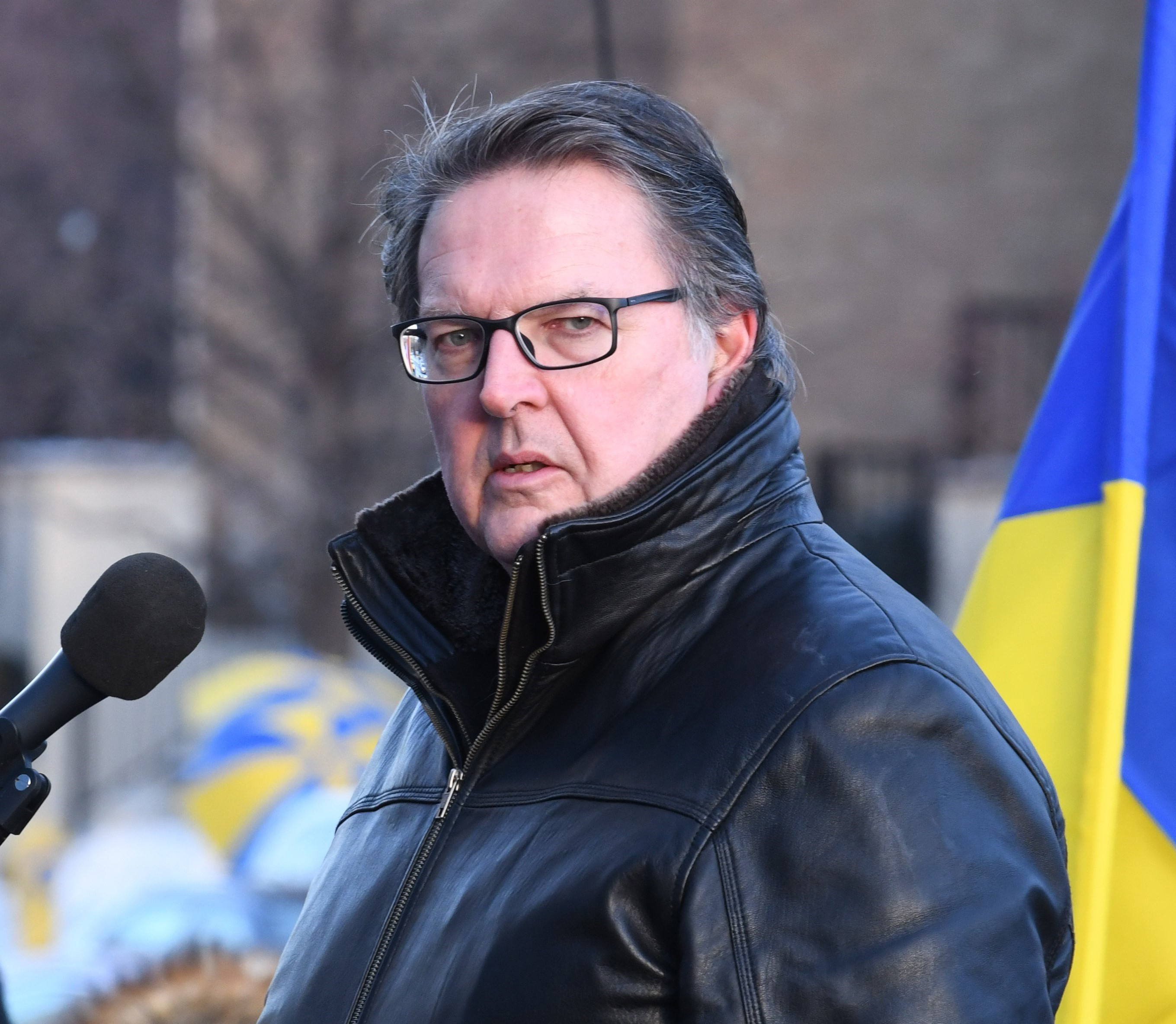

Member of the Canadian Parliament for Etobicoke—Lakeshore
- Incumbent
- Assumed office 19 October 2015
- Preceded by: Bernard Trottier

Toronto City Councillor for Ward 5 (Etobicoke—Lakeshore)
- In office 7 July 2014 – 30 November 2014
- Preceded by: Peter Milczyn
- Succeeded by: Justin Di Ciano

Personal details
- Born: 16 July 1964 (age 62) Fort William, Ontario, Canada
- Party: Liberal
- Education: University of Windsor; University of Wales; Bishop's University
- Profession: Lawyer

James V. Maloney MP (born 16 July 1964) is a Canadian lawyer and politician, who was elected to the House of Commons of Canada in the 2015 election. He represents the electoral district of Etobicoke—Lakeshore as a member of the Liberal Party.

== Education and early career ==
Maloney has law degrees from the University of Windsor and University of Wales, as well as a B.A. from Bishop's University.

Prior to his election, Maloney worked as a litigation lawyer with Hughes Amys LLP having been called to the Ontario Bar in 1996. He served as a litigation lawyer for 20 years prior to entering politics. He was involved in a number of significant cases including the tainted blood scandal of the 1980s and the Elliot Lake Commission of Inquiry.

An active volunteer, Mr. Maloney is the former President of the Toronto Lawyers' Club and has served on the Board of Directors of the local Franklin Horner Community Centre, the Ontario Public Accountants Council, and the Catholic Children's Aid Society of Toronto. For his significant contributions to Canada, he was awarded the Queen Elizabeth II Diamond Jubilee Medal.

== Municipal politics ==
Maloney was appointed to Toronto City Council in 2014 to represent Ward 5 (Etobicoke—Lakeshore) as interim councillor following the resignation of Peter Milczyn from the council.

== Federal politics ==
Prior to becoming the Liberal Party candidate in Etobicoke—Lakeshore. Maloney served as president of the electoral district association.

Maloney was elected Member of Parliament for Etobicoke—Lakeshore in the 2015 election as part of the Liberal Party near-sweep of the Greater Toronto Area, and briefly was appointed to the Standing Joint Committee for the Scrutiny of Regulations.

Between February 2016 and 2021, Maloney has served as Chair of the Standing Committee on Natural Resources and a member of the Liaison Committee. Following the 2019 general election he was appointed as a member of the standing committee on Justice and Human Rights.

Maloney served as Chair of the Toronto Government Caucus from 2016 until 2021 when he was elected to the Chair of the Ontario Liberal Caucus. He is also the Chair of the Canada/Ireland Parliamentary Group, the Canada/United Kingdom Parliamentary Association, vice-president of the Canada-Europe Parliamentary Association, and vice-chair of the Canada/United States Interparliamentary Group. He is a member of the Canada/Israel Interparliamentary group, the Canada/Ukraine Parliamentary group, the Canada/Italy Interparliamentary group, the Canada/Japan Interparliamentary group, the Canadian branch of the Commonwealth Parliamentary Association, the Canadian Delegation to the Organization for Security and Co-operation in Europe Parliamentary assembly, the Canadian NATO Parliamentary Association, the Canadian Group of the Interparliamentary Union and Parliamentary Friends of Tibet Canada.

In addition to his role in several international parliamentary associations, Maloney is a member of the House of Commons Special Joint Committee on Medical Assistance in Dying. In January 2020, the Prime Minister appointed him to the National Security and Intelligence Committee of Parliamentarians. In September 2023, he was appointed Parliamentary Secretary to the Minister of Justice and Attorney General of Canada.

In October 2016, some community groups in south Etobicoke criticized Maloney for encouraging Metrolinx to drop an appeal of a rezoning decision made by city council, allowing a developer to build homes on a stretch of land south of Judson Street previously used for commercial and industrial purposes. Some groups claimed he was favouring the interests of his political allies Mark Grimes and Justin Di Ciano over the interests of local residents. Maloney has stated that he has "no fiduciary relationship" with Dunpar Homes LTD, the developer of the project. Metrolinx warned that if homes were built in the area, noise complaints from residents could force the Willowbrook Rail Maintenance Facility to close. As of 2023, those concerns have not materialized, and the facility remains open.

Maloney was re-elected in the 2019 Canadian federal election.

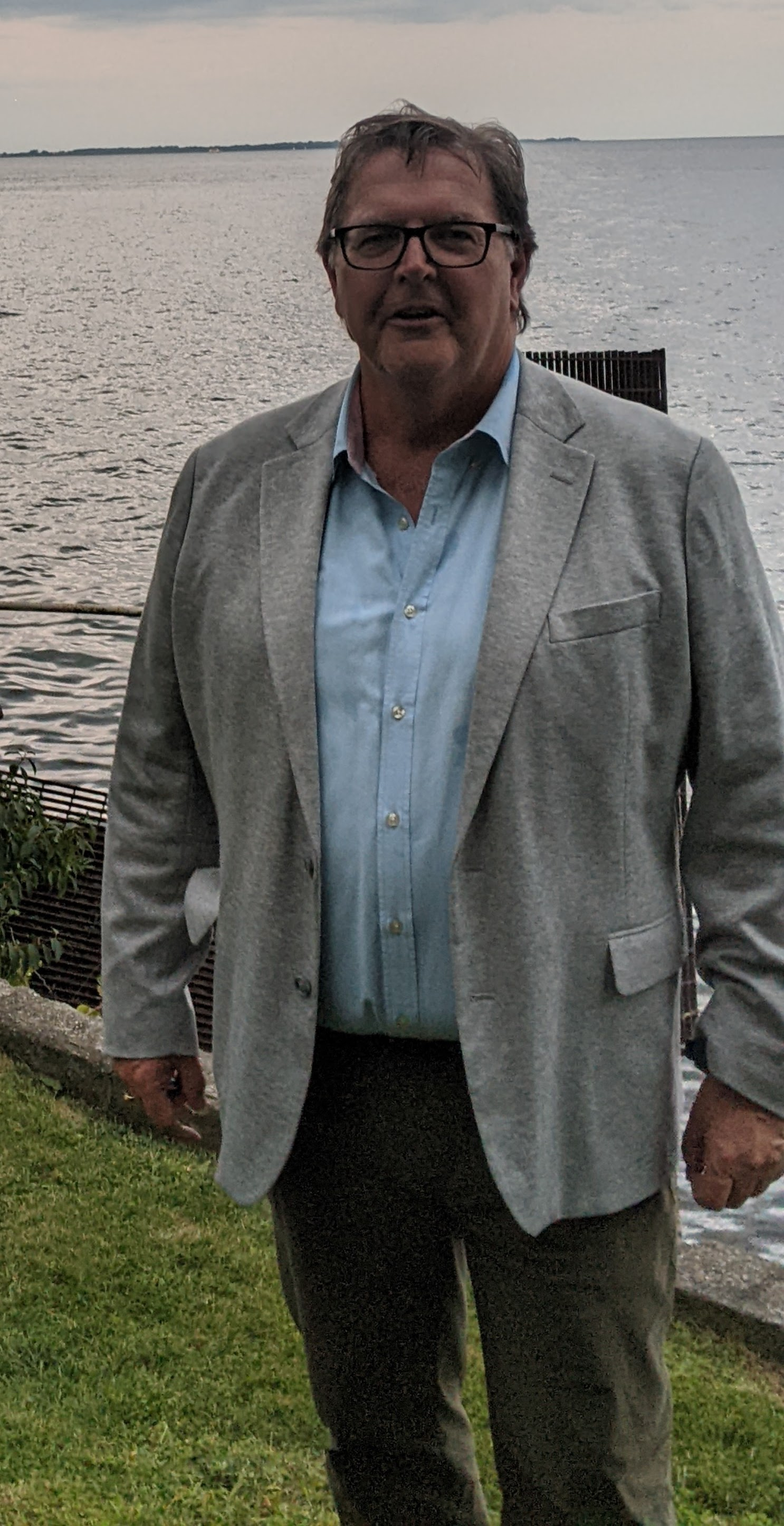
James Maloney, pictured in 2024

In January 2020, Maloney introduced a Private member's motion proposing to declare March as Irish Heritage Month. The motion was adopted unanimously by the House of Commons on 10 March 2021.

On 19 November 2020, the Conflict of Interest and Ethics Commissioner Mario Dion released an investigative report claiming that Maloney violated the Conflict of Interest Code for Members of the House of Commons when he missed the deadline to disclose his and his family's private interests. The report has been criticized by MPs both within and outside of Maloney's own Liberal party, most notably Conservative MP Scott Reid, who released a blog post calling the report and process behind it "vindictive", and criticizing the appropriateness of forcing Maloney to publicly apologize for a mistake made in good faith and corrected immediately. On 19 February 2021, the House of Commons rejected the report 153 to 133, with support from all parties. Maloney was re-elected in the 2021 Canadian federal election, and he was also re-elected in the 2025 Canadian federal election. Shortly after the 2025 election, Maloney was chosen to be the National Chair of the government caucus. He was also elected chair of the Canadian House of Commons Standing Committee on Justice and Human Rights in the 45th Canadian Parliament in 2025.

== Personal life ==
Maloney was born in Thunder Bay and has lived in Etobicoke most of his life, attending Michael Power High School. He lives in south Etobicoke with his wife and their dog, Walnut. His father, William Maloney, was appointed to the Supreme Court of Ontario in July 1975 and his mother Marian Maloney, a lifelong activist for women's participation in the Canadian government, was appointed by Prime Minister Chrétien to serve in the Canadian Senate in 1999. Maloney identifies as a Roman Catholic.

== Electoral record ==
2025 Canadian federal election: Etobicoke—Lakeshore
Party	Candidate	Votes	%	±%	Expenditures
Liberal	James Maloney	37,512	57.4	+10.2	
Conservative	Bernard Trottier	25,348	38.8	+6.3	
New Democratic	Cory Wagar	1,665	2.5	–11.0	
People's	Thomas Fanjoy	616	0.9	–3.5	
Marxist–Leninist	Janice Murray	197	0.3	+0.1	
Total valid votes/expense limit		65,338	99.4	—	
Total rejected ballots		369	0.6	—	
Turnout		65,707	70.6	+7.5	
Eligible voters		93,139			
Liberal hold		Swing		+2.07	
Source: Elections Canada

2021 Canadian federal election: Etobicoke—Lakeshore
Party	Candidate	Votes	%	±%	Expenditures
Liberal	James Maloney	30,355	47.4	-4.5	$83,584.34
Conservative	Indira Bains	20,457	31.9	+3.2	$119,099.99
New Democratic	Sasha Kane	8,775	13.7	+1.8	$12,774.33
People's	Bill McLachlan	2,857	4.5	+3.2	$0.00
Green	Afam Elue	1,363	2.1	-3.9	$4,336.35
Marxist–Leninist	Anna Di Carlo	139	0.2	±0.0	$0.00
Rhinoceros	Sean Carson	119	0.2	N/A	$0.00
Total valid votes/expense limit		64,065	99.4	–	$128,462.93
Total rejected ballots		397	0.6		
Turnout		64,462	63.1		
Eligible voters		102,151			
Liberal hold		Swing		-3.9	
Source: Elections Canada

2019 Canadian federal election: Etobicoke—Lakeshore
Party	Candidate	Votes	%	±%	Expenditures
Liberal	James Maloney	36,061	51.88	-1.82	$117,733.35
Conservative	Barry O'Brien	19,952	28.70	-3.75	$107,171.56
New Democratic	Branko Gasperlin	8,277	11.91	+1.01	$19,071.10
Green	Chris Caldwell	4,141	5.96	+3.62	none listed
People's	Jude Sulejmani	921	1.32	-	none listed
Marxist–Leninist	Janice Murray	163	0.23	-0.03	$0.00
Total valid votes/expense limit		69,515	99.25		
Total rejected ballots		525	0.75	+0.28	
Turnout		70,040	67.19	-1.85	
Eligible voters		104,246			
Liberal hold		Swing		+0.96	
Source: Elections Canada

2015 Canadian federal election: Etobicoke—Lakeshore
Party	Candidate	Votes	%	±%	Expenditures
Liberal	James Maloney	34,638	53.70	+18.60	$154,037.25
Conservative	Bernard Trottier	20,932	32.45	-7.78	$114,083.23
New Democratic	Phil Trotter	7,030	10.90	-9.40	$27,861.80
Green	Angela Salewsky	1,507	2.34	-1.68	$2,045.10
Animal Alliance	Liz White	233	0.36	–	$4,975.83
Marxist–Leninist	Janice Murray	168	0.26	-0.10	–
Total valid votes/expense limit		64,508	99.53		$233,887.62
Total rejected ballots		307	0.47		
Turnout		64,815	69.04		
Eligible voters		93,880			
Liberal gain from Conservative		Swing		+13.19	
Source: Elections Canada

== See also ==
- Marian Maloney
