= Terry Grier =

Canadian politician (1936–2023)

Member of Parliament for Toronto-Lakeshore
- In office 1972–1974
- Preceded by: Ken Robinson
- Succeeded by: Ken Robinson

6th President and Vice-Chancellor of Ryerson Polytechnic University
- In office 1988–1995 (Note: Ryerson Polytechnical Institute was granted university status in 1994, during Grier's term as President)
- Preceded by: Brian Segal
- Succeeded by: Claude Lajeunesse

Personal details
- Born: August 12, 1936 Toronto, Ontario, Canada
- Died: March 13, 2023 (aged 86) Toronto, Ontario, Canada
- Party: New Democratic Party
- Spouse: Ruth Grier
- Profession: University administrator

Terence Wyly Monro Grier (August 12, 1936 – March 13, 2023) was a Canadian politician, lecturer and university administrator.

== Education and political career ==
Grier graduated from the University of Trinity College in the University of Toronto in 1958. He served as the New Democratic Party's Member of Parliament for Toronto—Lakeshore from 1972 to 1974.

== Academic career ==
Following his defeat in the 1974 federal election, he returned to Ryerson Polytechnical Institute in Toronto where he was an instructor in the politics department. After terms as Dean of Arts and Vice-President Academic, he was appointed Ryerson's president in 1988 and oversaw the institution's transformation into a university by the end of his term in 1995.

== Personal life and death ==
His wife, Ruth Grier, was a politician in her own right serving on Etobicoke's city council and in the Ontario legislature as a New Democratic Party MPP and cabinet minister.

Grier died on March 13, 2023, at the age of 86.

== Electoral record ==
1974 Canadian federal election: Toronto—Lakeshore
Party	Candidate	Votes	%	±%
Liberal	Ken Robinson	14,241	40.1	+4.2
New Democratic	Terry Grier	12,584	35.4	-4.0
Progressive Conservative	Jim Muir	8,475	23.9	-0.2
Communist	Ginny Thomson	145	0.4	
Marxist–Leninist	Paul Herman	68	0.2	
Total valid votes		35,513	100.0	

1972 Canadian federal election: Toronto—Lakeshore
Party	Candidate	Votes	%	±%
New Democratic	Terry Grier	14,722	39.4	+2.6
Liberal	Ken Robinson	13,393	35.9	-7.2
Progressive Conservative	Dmytro Kupiak	9,004	24.1	+3.9
Independent	Gordon Massie	124	0.3	
Independent	George Bedard	102	0.3	
Total valid votes		37,345	100.0	

1968 Canadian federal election: Lakeshore
Party	Candidate	Votes	%
Liberal	Ken Robinson	14,464	43.0
New Democratic	Terry Grier	12,367	36.8
Progressive Conservative	Stuart Summerhayes	6,794	20.2
Total valid votes		33,625	100.0

== Notes ==
Academic offices
Preceded by Brian Segal	President of Ryerson Polytechnical Institute/Ryerson Polytechnic University; 1988–1995	Succeeded by Claude Lajeunesse
