= Patrick Boyer =

Canadian politician

Patrick Boyer KC

Member of Parliament for Etobicoke—Lakeshore
- In office September 4, 1984 – October 25, 1993
- Preceded by: Ken Robinson
- Succeeded by: Jean Augustine

Personal details
- Born: March 4, 1945 (age 81) Bracebridge, Ontario, Canada
- Party: Progressive Conservative; Conservative
- Spouse(s): Corinne (deceased); Elise Marie
- Profession: Lawyer, writer

J. Patrick Boyer KC (born March 4, 1945) is a Canadian journalist, author, and book publisher, was a Progressive Conservative Member of Parliament from 1984 to 1993.

He holds an honours degree in economics and political science from Carleton University, a Master's degree in Canadian history from University of Toronto and a Doctor of Laws degree, also from University of Toronto. Boyer studied French-Canadian literature at University of Montreal, and international law at the Academy of the International Court of Justice in The Hague.

He was a partner in the Toronto firm law firm Fraser & Beatty, specializing in communications and electoral law, and also practised law in the Western Arctic as a member of the Northwest Territories Bar. He was a founder and contributing columnist of Lawyer's Weekly newspaper. He wrote six legal texts on Canadian election law at federal, provincial, territorial, band council, and municipal levels.

== Career ==
=== Politics ===
Patrick Boyer worked on Parliament Hill in the 1960s for Quebec MP Heward Grafftey and for Opposition Leader Robert Stanfield. In the early 1970s, he was executive assistant to Ontario Attorney General Arthur Wishart. In 1983, Prime Minister Pierre Trudeau named him executive director of the federal Task Force on Conflict of Interest, which produced the 1984 report Ethical Conduct in the Public Sector.

That year, he was elected to Parliament, representing Toronto's Etobicoke—Lakeshore riding as a Progressive Conservative. He chaired parliamentary committees on election law reform, equality rights, and the status of disabled persons. In 1989, Prime Minister Brian Mulroney appointed him parliamentary secretary to External Affairs Minister Joe Clark. In 1991, he became parliamentary secretary to Minister of National Defence Marcel Masse.

In 1993, Boyer ran unsuccessfully for the leadership of the Progressive Conservatives, following Mulroney's announced retirement. He published his policies in the book Hands-On Democracy, in French La democratie pour tous. In the 1993 general election, when just two Progressive Conservatives in all Canada were elected, Boyer was not one of them.

In 2001, he unsuccessfully sought the Progressive Conservative Party of Ontario provincial nomination in the riding of Parry Sound—Muskoka for a by-election to replace retiring MPP Ernie Eves.

In March 2007, Boyer was again nominated as the Conservative Party of Canada candidate for the riding of Etobicoke—Lakeshore. He ran in the 2008 federal election but lost to Michael Ignatieff by 5,783 votes.

During the 2007 Ontario electoral reform referendum, Patrick Boyer was a leading member, along with Senators Hugh Segal and Nancy Ruth, Hon. Janet Ecker, and Rick Anderson, of Conservatives for the proposed reform of Ontario's electoral system from "first-past-the-post" to "mixed-member proportional."

=== Academics ===
Following Boyer's departure from politics, he taught "The Law of Canadian Democracy" at the University of Toronto. In 1999 and 2000, he taught courses in Canadian Constitutional Law at Wilfrid Laurier University, Waterloo, Ontario. As a faculty member in the Department of Political Science at University of Guelph, Ontario, he also taught courses on politics, accountability, democracy, and ethics. He also was executive director of the university's Centre for Leadership Studies.

=== Public policy ===
Boyer is a past president of the Couchiching Institute on Public Affairs, past chair of Pugwash Thinkers' Lodge in Nova Scotia, and a member of Canadian Pugwash Group, the Canadian Civil Liberties Association, The Writers' Union of Canada, and the Canadian Association of Former Parliamentarians.

An advocate of proportional representation, Boyer is a member of the National Advisory Board of Fair Vote Canada. Also an advocate for women's wellbeing, he founded the Corinne Boyer Fund for Ovarian Cancer Research and Treatment, which continues today as Ovarian Cancer Canada.

With strong interest in democracy, he is founding president of Breakout Educational Network, a not-for-profit public policy organization addressing Canadian fiscal and foreign policy from the perspective of citizens though television documentaries, books, public forums, and classroom teaching. Boyer has worked overseas on democratic development projects in Cambodia, Iraq, Vietnam, Thailand, Ukraine, and Bulgaria.

=== Writer and publisher ===
J. Patrick Boyer is author of more than twenty books, dozens of feature articles, and hundreds of newspaper columns.

Boyer also owns and operates publishing houses "Muskoka Books" and "Blue Butterfly Books." In 2010, he consolidated Blue Butterfly's publishing operations with those of Dundurn Press.

== Personal life ==
Patrick Boyer married Corinne Mudde of the Netherlands on August 15, 1970. She had worked in the foreign service of the Netherlands. She was an ardent advocate for women's rights, endangered species, and the environment. She was an investigator in the Ontario Ombudsman's Office, and chaired the Parliamentary Spouses Committee on Soviet Jewry. In 1995, Corinne Boyer succumbed to ovarian cancer, after surviving two prior battles with cancer, a melanoma in 1979 and a breast tumor in 1991. In the years before she died, and largely because of her own experiences with cancers afflicting females, she fought for increased funding for women's health research. In 1997, Patrick Boyer founded the Corinne Boyer Fund which was dedicated to advancing research into ovarian cancer, improving detection and treatment, and raising awareness of the disease in Canada. In 1998, the Corinne Boyer Fund and the University of Ottawa established the Corinne Boyer Chair in Ovarian Cancer Research and Treatment, within the Faculty of Medicine. In 1999, the organization's name was changed to National Ovarian Cancer Association, now Ovarian Cancer Canada. In June 2014, at a ceremony in Vancouver, Patrick received the Virginia Greene Award for Leadership on Ovarian Cancer.

== Electoral record ==
2008 Canadian federal election: Etobicoke—Lakeshore
Party	Candidate	Votes	%	±%	Expenditures
Liberal	Michael Ignatieff	23,536	46.13	▲2.5	$65,816
Conservative	Patrick Boyer	17,793	34.87	▼0.3	$86,667
New Democratic	Liam McHugh-Russell	5,950	11.66	▼3.9	$20,386
Green	David Corail	3,562	6.98	▲1.9	$946
Marxist–Leninist	Janice Murray	181	0.35	▲0.2	
Total valid votes/expense limit		51,022	100.00	$88,903	
Total rejected ballots		213	0.42		
Turnout		51,235			

1993 Canadian federal election: Etobicoke—Lakeshore
Party	Candidate	Votes	%	±%
Liberal	Jean Augustine	19,458	42.1	
Progressive Conservative	Patrick Boyer	14,306	31.0	-15.1
Reform	Ken Anstruther	8,693	18.8	
New Democratic	Karen Ridley	2,316	5.0	-39.2
National	Gilles Brunet	861	1.9	
Natural Law	Don Jackson	283	0.6	
Libertarian	Alan D'Orsay	197	0.4	-6.6
Marxist–Leninist	Julie Northrup	78	0.2	
Abolitionist	Michael McCabe	2	0.0	
Total valid votes		46,194	100.0	

1988 Canadian federal election: Etobicoke—Lakeshore
Party	Candidate	Votes	%	±%
Progressive Conservative	Patrick Boyer	20,405	46.0	+1.3
New Democratic	Judy Brandow	19,609	44.2	+20.5
Libertarian	Daniel Hunt	3,097	7.0	+6.3
Green	Dan Freeman	679	1.5	
Independent	Françoise Roy	393	0.9	
Communist	Vicky Holloway	141	0.3	-0.2
Total valid votes		44,324	100.0	

1984 Canadian federal election: Etobicoke—Lakeshore
Party	Candidate	Votes	%	±%
Progressive Conservative	Patrick Boyer	19,902	44.8	+14.7
Liberal	Ken Robinson	13,455	30.3	-10.5
New Democratic	Pat Lawlor	10,549	23.7	-4.6
Libertarian	Monica Cain	317	0.7	+0.2
Communist	Peter Boychuck	216	0.5	
Total valid votes		44,439	100.0	

== Works ==
- Muskokans Fight the Great War / Striking Back for the Empire 1914-1918 (Muskoka Books, 2019)
- Forcing Choice: The Risky Reward of Referendums (Toronto: Dundurn, 2017)
- Foreign Voices in the House: A Century of Addresses to Canada's Parliament by World Leaders (Toronto: Dundurn, 2017)
- The Big Blue Machine: How Tory Campaign Backrooms Changed Canadian Politics Forever (Toronto: Dundurn, 2015)
- Our Scandalous Senate (Toronto: Dundurn, 2014)
- Another Country, Another Life: Calumny, Love, and the Secrets of Isaac Jelfs (Toronto: Dundurn, 2013)
- Raw Life: Cameos of 1890s Justice from a Magistrate's Bench Book (Toronto: Dundurn, 2012)
- Solitary Courage: Mona Winberg and the Triumph over Disability (Toronto: Blue Butterfly Books, 2010)
- Local Library, Global Passport: The Evolution of a Carnegie Library (Toronto: Blue Butterfly Books, 2008)
- A Passion for Justice: How 'Vinegar Jim' McRuer Became Canada's Greatest Law Reformer [revised paperback edition] (Toronto: Blue Butterfly Books, 2008)
- A Man & His Words (Toronto: Canadian Shield Communications & Dundurn, 2003)
- Leading in an Upside-Down World [contributing editor] (Toronto: University of Guelph & Dundurn, 2003)
- "Just Trust Us": The Erosion of Accountability in Canada (Toronto: Breakout Educational Network & Dundurn, 2003)
- The Leadership Challenge in the 21st Century [contributing editor] (Guelph: University of Guelph, 2002)
- Accountability and Canadian Government (Guelph: University of Guelph, 2000)
- Boyer's Ontario Election Law (Toronto: Carswell Publishing, 1996)
- A Passion for Justice: The Life and Legacy of J.C. McRuer [hardcover edition] (Toronto: University of Toronto Press & Osgoode Society, 1994)
- Direct Democracy in Canada: The History and Future of Referendums (Toronto: Dundurn, 1992)
- The People's Mandate: Referendums and a More Democratic Canada (Toronto: Dundurn, 1992)
- Hands-On Democracy: How You Can Take Part in Canada's Renewal (Toronto: Stoddart, 1993)
- La Democratie pour tous: Le citoyen…artisan du renouveau Canadien (Toronto: Stoddart, 1993)
- Local Elections in Canada: The Law Governing Elections of Municipal Councils, School Boards and Other Local Authorities (Toronto: Butterworths, 1988)
- Election Law in Canada: The Law and Procedure of Federal, Provincial and Territorial Elections – Vol. I (Toronto: Butterworths, 1987)
- Election Law in Canada: The Law and Procedure of Federal, Provincial and Territorial Elections – Vol. II (Toronto: Butterworths, 1987)
- Money and Message: The Law Governing Election Financing, Advertising, Broadcasting and Campaigning in Canada (Toronto: Butterworths, 1983)
- Lawmaking by the People: Referendums and Plebiscites in Canada (Toronto: Butterworths, 1981)
- The Egalitarian Option: Perspectives on Canadian Education [contributing author] (Toronto: Compass Books, 1975)
