= Brian Segal =

Canadian University President (born 1943)

Brian Segal CM

5th President of the Ryerson Polytechnical Institute
- In office 1980 – 1988
- Preceded by: Walter Pitman
- Succeeded by: Terry Grier

Personal details
- Born: 1943 (age 82–83)
- Education: McGill University; Yeshiva University (MSW); University of Pittsburgh (MSc, PhD)

Brian Segal CM (born 1943) is a former Canadian publishing executive and university administrator. He was the president and CEO of the Rogers Publishing division of Rogers Communications.

Previously, Segal had been president of Ryerson Polytechnical Institute from 1980 to 1988 and president of the University of Guelph from 1988 until 1992 when he left to join Maclean Hunter Publications (now Rogers Publishing) as the publisher of Maclean's magazine. He served as a publisher of Maclean's and vice-president of Rogers Publishing until 1999 when he became president and CEO of Rogers Publishing until retiring in 2012.

In his academic career, Segal earned his undergraduate degree at McGill University from 1960 to 1964, a Master of Social Work at Yeshiva University from 1964 to 1967, and a Master of Science and PhD from the University of Pittsburgh from 1967 to 1971 with a speciality in public health. He subsequently taught at Florida State University from 1971 to 1973, Carleton University from 1973 to 1980, and then Ryerson Polytechnical Institute where he entered administration. He has also been chair of the Board of Trustees of the National Institute of Nutrition, chair of the Government of Canada's National Innovations Advisory Committee and a director of IBM Canada, Union Gas, Sun Life Trust, and Schneider Corporation as well as a past chairman of the Shaw Festival. Other positions include a Strategic Planning Director with the Canadian Government's Department of Secretary of State, a founding member of Design Exchange, and a Campaign Cabinet member for the United Way of Toronto.

Segal's honours and awards include a Doctor of Laws (Honoris Causa) from Ryerson University in 2008 and a Legacy Laureate from the University of Pittsburgh in 2011. In 2009, he was named Ryerson University's Distinguished Visiting Executive, and Chair of the Ted Rogers Leadership Centre. Segal was made a member of the Order of Canada in 2021.

He is the brother of former Canadian senator Hugh Segal.

Academic offices
Preceded by Walter Pitman	President of the Ryerson Polytechnical Institute; 1980–1988	Succeeded by Terry Grier
