= Alan Eagleson =

Canadian disbarred lawyer and ice hockey agent/promoter

- Born: Robert Alan Eagleson; April 24, 1933 (age 93); St. Catharines, Ontario, Canada
- Education: University of Toronto
- Occupation: Lawyer (Disbarred)
- Known for: Defrauding NHL players and tournaments
- Awards: Order of Canada (revoked)

Member of Provincial Parliament for Lakeshore
- In office September 25, 1963 – October 17, 1967
- Preceded by: New riding
- Succeeded by: Patrick Lawlor

Personal details
- Party: Progressive Conservative

Robert Alan Eagleson (born April 24, 1933) is a Canadian disbarred lawyer, hockey agent and promoter. Clients that he represented included superstars Bobby Orr and Darryl Sittler. He was the first executive director of the NHL Players Association (NHLPA), which was initially lauded for improving the bargaining power of National Hockey League (NHL) players. He is also well known for providing the opportunity for professional players to compete in international hockey, by promoting the 1972 Summit Series between Canada and the Soviet Union, and the Canada Cup (now the World Cup of Hockey). However, Eagleson was convicted of fraud and embezzlement and briefly imprisoned, after it was revealed that he had abused his position for many years by defrauding his clients and skimming money from tournaments. After his convictions, he was removed as a member of the Order of Canada and resigned from the Hockey Hall of Fame where he had been inducted in the builder category.

== The Blue and White Group ==
Eagleson graduated in law from the University of Toronto and soon became a prominent lawyer in Toronto. He first became involved with hockey as an advisor to Bob Pulford, a player with the Toronto Maple Leafs. It was quickly realized that any attempt to create a union would be easier to achieve with Leafs players as his base of power. That led to other members of the Leafs becoming clients, most notably defenceman Carl Brewer, who hired Eagleson as his agent.

Eagleson formed the Blue and White Group, a group of friends he had known from the Maple Leafs, including Brewer, Pulford, Bobby Baun and Billy Harris, along with a car dealer, a jeweller, and three other lawyers. Eagleson's motive was to educate these players about investments, and use their funds more intelligently. Pulford, Baun, Brewer and Harris eventually earned university degrees after their playing careers. Two members of the Blue and White Group, Pulford and Baun, were the first two presidents of the NHLPA.

The Leafs' acquisition of Andy Bathgate was advantageous to Eagleson. A friendship was forged in Toronto which followed Bathgate to Detroit, where Eagleson started to talk to Red Wings players about the concept of a union.

== A hockey power ==
Eagleson's influence in the hockey world began when he negotiated Bobby Orr's first professional contract with the Boston Bruins. This marked the first time an agent represented a professional hockey player. Secondly, Carl Brewer fought to have his amateur status reinstated. Lastly, Eagleson was involved in representing the Springfield Indians during their negotiations with owner Eddie Shore over players' rights. These events solidified Eagleson's reputation, and he became the catalyst for the NHLPA. When the NHLPA was formed in 1967, Eagleson was appointed its first executive director, a position he held for 25 years.

By 1979, Eagleson represented more than a dozen Toronto Maple Leafs players, including Darryl Sittler and his best friend and linemate, Lanny McDonald. Eagleson had a strained relationship with Leafs owner Harold Ballard and general manager Punch Imlach. Imlach believed Sittler had too much influence on the team and tried to undermine his authority with the players. When Sittler and goaltender Mike Palmateer agreed to appear on the TV show Showdown, as negotiated by the NHLPA, Imlach went to court to try to get an injunction to stop them. When Imlach said that he was open to offers for Sittler from other teams, Eagleson said it would cost $500,000 to get Sittler to waive the no-trade clause in his contract. So, instead of trading Sittler, Imlach sent McDonald to the woeful Colorado Rockies on December 29, 1979. In response, Sittler ripped the captain's C off his sweater, later commenting that a captain had to be the go-between with players and management, and he no longer had any communication with management. Ballard likened Sittler's actions to burning the Canadian flag.

Eagleson was elected to the Hockey Hall of Fame in 1989 as a builder—the first instance of a union official being elected to the hall of fame in a major team sport. That same year, Eagleson was named an Officer of the Order of Canada for his work in promoting the sport.

Over the years, Eagleson developed a very close relationship with league president John Ziegler. For all intents and purposes, the NHL of the 1980s was ruled by a triumvirate of Ziegler, Eagleson and Chicago Blackhawks owner Bill Wirtz, who was chairman of the NHL board of governors.

=== International Hockey ===
Eagleson was also active in promoting the sport, helping to organize the historic 1972 Summit Series—the first time Canadian and Soviet professionals had ever competed against each other on the ice. According to the Globe and Mail, his role as "manager and motivator, travel agent and godfather, firebrand and peacemaker" for the first squad ever to be known as Team Canada earned him wide recognition and the nickname "Uncle Al". Eagleson travelled regularly to negotiations and ice hockey events in Europe with an entourage, and employed Aggie Kukulowicz as a Russian language interpreter.

Notably, Eagleson was responsible for the decision to exclude many WHA stars from the Summit Series, including Bobby Hull, Gerry Cheevers and Derek Sanderson, as they had chosen to play in the WHA instead of the NHL. Four years later, Eagleson organized the first Canada Cup, which included WHA players.

During the final game of the Summit Series games in Moscow, Eagleson garnered international attention by attempting to confront off-ice officials after the goal judge had failed to light the goal lamp when a Canadian player scored, at which point he was seized by soldiers of the Red Army. The Canadian players and the few Canadian fans rallied to his defence to prevent him from being arrested, providing one of the most memorable off-ice moments of the series. As they walked back across the ice, Eagleson shaking his fist at the Soviet goal judge. John Ferguson extended his middle fingers to the crowd.

In 1984, Eagleson called into question American hockey player Mike Eruzione’s amateur status. Eruzione had scored the gold medal-winning goal in the 1980 Winter Olympics for the US against the Soviet Union. Eruzione rebutted the charges, saying "He's trying to take something away from me that we so richly deserved. He can't take away the memory. Is he going to try to convince everybody in the United States we lost?"

== Political career ==
Eagleson was also active in politics for many years. In the 1963 federal election, he ran unsuccessfully for a seat in the House of Commons of Canada for the Progressive Conservatives in the Toronto riding of York West. He was defeated by then-active NHL player Red Kelly, who ran for the Liberals. Later that year, he was elected to the Ontario Legislative Assembly as the Progressive Conservative MPP for the newly created Toronto riding of Lakeshore. He served there until 1967 when he was defeated by Patrick Lawlor of the Ontario New Democratic Party.

He was a major PC fundraiser and president of the Progressive Conservative Party of Ontario from 1968 to 1976. He would become part of Bill Davis' Big Blue Machine that dominated Ontario politics for much of the 1970s and 1980s.

== Criminal convictions and dishonour ==
As Eagleson's power grew, concern was raised about his multiple roles as union chief, player agent and hockey promoter. Suspicions also rose that he was reaping a substantial windfall from the Canada Cup and other arrangements unknown to the players. In addition, many local Canadian journalists owed favours or access to Eagleson.

In 1989 player agents Ritch Winter and Ron Salcer teamed up with former National Football League union official Ed Garvey to author a devastating review of the NHLPA's operations. Winter and Salcer had been critical of Eagleson's stewardship for many years, and felt he was not giving them the support they needed to adequately represent their clients. The report, presented at a union meeting in West Palm Beach, revealed that Eagleson's travel expenses were not subject to any form of review by the union. Winter and Salcer also charged that Eagleson was skimming off money from advertising on the dasher boards, and had lent pension money to friends. Eagleson was able to weather this storm because the union's executive committee was stacked with longtime associates. Eagleson then announced he would be stepping down as executive director in 1992.

=== Russ Conway investigates ===
In 1990, Russ Conway, sports editor of The Eagle-Tribune, began an investigation of Eagleson's performance in office. Conway had heard rumours for some time that something was seriously amiss about the inner workings of the NHL—specifically, serious discrepancies in pension payments. Despite the devastating 1989 report by Winter and Salcer, most Canadian journalists did not look into the rumours. Over the course of a year, Conway interviewed many NHL personalities, including former and active players and NHL officials.

In September 1991, he published the first of many instalments in a series called Cracking the Ice: Intrigue and Conflict in the World of Big-Time Hockey, a series that was intended to last six months, but which would run for most of the 1990s based on the information gleaned, and which earned Conway a Pulitzer nomination. The series revealed evidence that Eagleson had engaged in a staggering litany of unethical and criminal conduct over many years.

Conway's writings alleged that Eagleson had embezzled player pension funds for many years. For example, in 1976 after Orr's contract with Boston ran out, Eagleson said that the Blackhawks had a deal on the table that Orr could not refuse. It later emerged that the Bruins had offered Orr one of the most lucrative contracts in sports history, including an 18 per cent stake in the team; however, Eagleson claimed the Blackhawks had a better offer. Blackhawks owner Bill Wirtz was never charged with wrongdoing, largely because the Bruins' offer was widely known in league circles, and even reported in the Toronto Star. No other NHL owner was ever charged in the affair. Orr was once one of Eagleson's strongest supporters, but broke with him after suspecting that he was being cheated. Orr, whose career ended in 1978 because of serious knee injuries, learned from an independent accountant that he was almost insolvent from tax liabilities, despite having supposedly earned high salaries while being represented by Eagleson. It took Orr several years to recover his fortune.

However, the series' most shocking revelation concerned Eagleson's actions regarding disability claims by former players. Eagleson was accused of taking large payments from insurance claims before the players filing them received their share, telling the players that he earned the "fee" while fighting against the insurance companies to get the claims paid. In fact, many players later learned that the insurance companies had already agreed to pay the claims and there had been no "fight". In other cases in which a "fight" with the insurance companies was required, several players ran into bureaucratic dead ends and no support from Eagleson while they tried to move forward on insurance and pension claims to support their families. Conway was particularly moved by the ordeal of second-line defenceman Ed Kea, who suffered a devastating head injury that required major brain surgery and left him physically and mentally disabled. This not only ended Kea's playing days but also jeopardized his post-hockey career and finances, as he was playing in a minor league game and NHL benefits for catastrophic injuries did not apply to his case. Unable to hold a job, Kea's family which included four children struggled for several years. Conway was appalled that Eagleson "didn't even have the common decency to go visit the family. He wouldn't aid them in the insurance process. He was gone. Crush up the cigarette pack, throw it out. Next!" Conway vowed never to forget Kea's story and later turned his series into the basis of a book, Game Misconduct: Alan Eagleson and the Corruption of Hockey.

Tipped off by Conway's investigations, future Vancouver Canucks General Manager Mike Gillis successfully sued Eagleson in 1997 for $570,000 for stealing a portion of his disability insurance.

Conway published several other stories over the next nine years about Eagleson's crimes. For instance, he had been reimbursed more than $62,000 for personal expenses from 1987 to 1989. He also revealed that the NHLPA had unknowingly footed the bill for expensive clothing, theatre tickets and a luxury apartment in London. Many players had been led to believe that they were playing in the Canada Cup for free because all the money was going to their pensions.

Conway worked very closely with Carl Brewer, one of Eagleson's early clients. Brewer had by this time become the leader of a group of former players who felt Eagleson had lied to them. Brewer's longtime companion, Susan Foster, provided a large amount of material to Conway.

Although Eagleson had been based in Toronto, most Canadian media organizations had avoided detailed investigation of his dealings until Conway's material was published. That changed when The Globe and Mail began its own examination of Eagleson's career in early 1993, and published a series of stories with further revelations. Two Globe sports writers, William Houston and David Shoalts, expanded that material, Conway's work, and the latest developments into their own book, entitled Eagleson: The Fall of a Hockey Czar, which was published later in 1993.

=== Criminality and disbarment ===
In 1994, Eagleson was charged by the FBI with 34 counts of racketeering, obstruction of justice, embezzlement and fraud in Boston. However, he still had enough political clout from his days as an MPP and a power broker with the Progressive Conservatives to stave off extradition to the United States until 1997. After a three-year investigation, the RCMP charged Eagleson with eight counts of fraud and theft. Some of Eagleson's former clients, including Bobby Orr, remarked that had it not been for the United States justice system, he would never have been charged. After being arrested, one FBI agent remarked that Eagleson "just didn't get it", as the former sports agent was tinkering with police equipment while being booked.

On January 6, 1998, Eagleson pleaded guilty to three counts of mail fraud in Boston, and was fined US$700,000. One day later, he pleaded guilty in Toronto to three more counts of fraud and embezzling hundreds of thousands of dollars of Canada Cup proceeds in 1984, 1987 and 1991. He was sentenced to 18 months in prison, of which he served six months at the Mimico Correctional Centre in Toronto. The conviction resulted in his automatic disbarment from the practice of law by the Law Society of Upper Canada, which regulates the profession in Ontario.

During the criminal proceedings against him, several players whom he had defrauded were amongst his biggest supporters. Many of his most ardent supporters during and after his trial were famous and prominent clients who had benefited from his activities, including high-profile hockey personalities such as Bobby Clarke, Bob Gainey and Marcel Dionne. Eagleson even had the support of some prominent Liberals, including former Prime Minister John Turner.

Eagleson was reportedly unrepentant about his crimes, and as of 2012 several former Team Canada players have refused to reconcile with him.

=== Removal of honours ===
==== Forced resignation from the Hockey Hall of Fame ====
On January 6, 1998, the day of Eagleson's first guilty plea, Hockey Hall of Fame member Brad Park made a public statement, saying, "I challenge the Hall of Fame to remove Alan Eagleson. If they do not, I will request to be removed. I do not want to be on the same wall as that man." Over the next six weeks, 18 other Hall of Fame players (including Bobby Orr, Andy Bathgate, Bobby Hull, Gordie Howe, Jean Béliveau, Mike Bossy, Johnny Bucyk, Ted Lindsay, Henri Richard, Johnny Bower, Darryl Sittler and Dickie Moore) followed Park's lead and threatened to resign from the Hall if Eagleson was allowed to remain.

The Hall initially tried to stay out of the controversy, but with the growing player revolt, a formal vote of board members was scheduled to decide the matter. Knowing that he faced all-but certain expulsion (an informal vote to expel him had already passed), Eagleson resigned in April 1998, six days before the board's final vote was scheduled. His resignation was accepted immediately, and Eagleson became the first member of a sports hall of fame in North America to resign.

==== Removal from the Order of Canada ====
Soon after his guilty plea, Eagleson was removed from the Order of Canada. Though he was not entitled to do so, he continued to wear his Order of Canada lapel pin during the court proceedings before his sentence.

=== After release from jail ===
Since being released, Eagleson has largely remained out of the limelight, although he was interviewed on television after Canada's loss to Russia in the 2006 Winter Olympic Games in Turin, Italy.

To date, all Summit Series events for Team Canada have involved only the players and coaches. Eagleson was originally invited to the 40th anniversary reunion of the Summit Series scheduled in September 2012 with the support of most members of Team Canada; however his invite was revoked due to opposition from Phil Esposito, Brad Park, and Dennis Hull. It has been suggested that some players still held a grudge not only because of Eagleson's fraud and abuse, but also his lack of contrition.

In October 2013, Orr commented on his perception of Eagleson's lack of integrity. Orr said, "I just wanted to get away from the man -- person", correcting himself as he refused to refer to Eagleson as a "man."

== Electoral record ==
1963 Canadian federal election: York West
Party	Candidate	Votes	%	±%
Liberal	Red Kelly	41,480	51.4	+9.1
Progressive Conservative	Alan Eagleson	24,479	30.3	-6.9
New Democratic	David Middleton	14,003	17.4	-1.4
Social Credit	David R. Milne	697	0.9	-0.7
Total valid votes		80,659	100.0	

== Notes ==
Preceded by new creation	NHLPA Executive Director; 1967–1991	Succeeded by Bob Goodenow
