= Marian Maloney =

Canadian politician

The Honourable Marian Lucille Maloney

Canadian Senator from Ontario
- In office June 11, 1998 – August 16, 1999
- Appointed by: Jean Chrétien

Personal details
- Born: Marian Lucille Auringer; August 16, 1924 Ponteix, Saskatchewan, Canada
- Died: May 29, 2010 (aged 85) Toronto, Ontario, Canada
- Party: Liberal
- Spouse: Anthony William Maloney
- Children: 3, including James
- Education: Fort William Collegiate Institute and Kings Business College

Marian L. Maloney (August 16, 1924 – May 29, 2010) was a Canadian Senator. Born in Ponteix, Saskatchewan, Maloney is a graduate of Fort William Collegiate Institute and Kings Business College in Thunder Bay, Ontario. From 1968 to 1978, she worked in customer service and administrative positions in both Thunder Bay and Toronto. In 1970, she founded Marian Maloney & Associates, an event management firm. She was married to Anthony William Maloney (1928–2004), a former justice of the Supreme Court of Ontario. They had three sons: James, Patrick, and Michael.

== Background ==
She was summoned to the Senate of Canada for the Ontario senatorial division of Surprise Lake on the advice of Prime Minister Jean Chrétien in 1998. A Liberal, she served for 1 year and 2 months until mandatory retirement in 1999.

She died in Toronto on May 29, 2010.
