= Peter Milczyn =

Canadian politician

The Honourable Peter Milczyn ECO
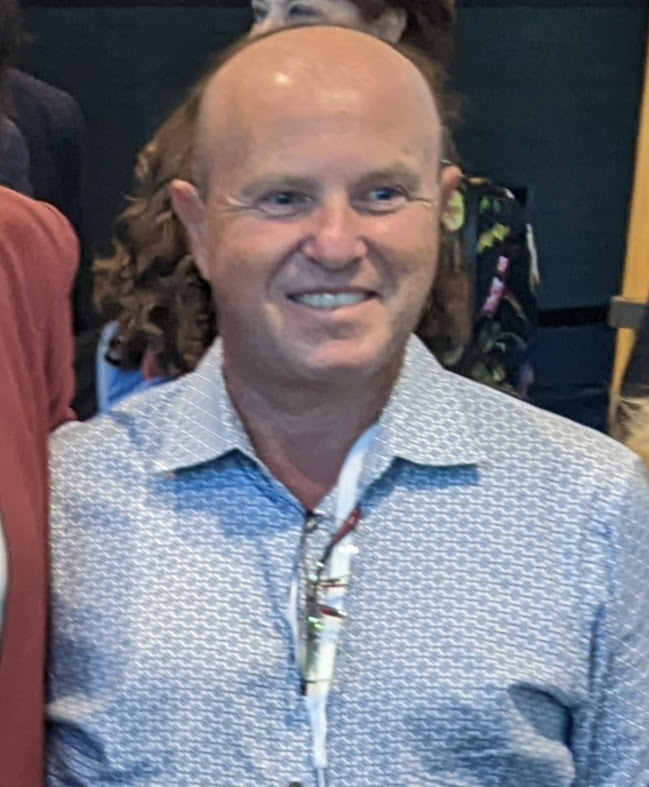

Ontario MPP
- In office 2014–2018
- Preceded by: Doug Holyday
- Succeeded by: Christine Hogarth
- Constituency: Etobicoke—Lakeshore

Toronto City Councillor for Ward 5 (Etobicoke—Lakeshore)
- In office December 1, 2000 – July 7, 2014
- Preceded by: Blake Kinahan
- Succeeded by: James Maloney

Etobicoke City Councillor
- In office December 1, 1994 – January 1, 1998
- Preceded by: Alex Faulkner
- Succeeded by: Position Abolished
- Constituency: Ward 2

Personal details
- Born: January 17, 1965 (age 61) Etobicoke, Ontario
- Party: Liberal
- Spouse: Rose
- Occupation: Urban Planner

Peter Zygmunt Milczyn (born January 17, 1965) is a former politician in Ontario, Canada. He was a Liberal member of the Legislative Assembly of Ontario from 2014 to 2018 who represented the west Toronto riding of Etobicoke—Lakeshore. He was a member of cabinet in the government of Kathleen Wynne. He was Minister of Housing from 2017 to 2018. Previously, he was a city councillor in Toronto, Ontario from 2000 to 2014.

== Background ==
Milczyn was born in Etobicoke. His parents, Wes Milczyn and Maria Graf, emigrated from Poland in 1963. His mother worked as a journalist in Poland. He attended Etobicoke Collegiate Institute and the University of Toronto where he obtained a degree in architecture. He set up his own design firm, but his interest in urban planning issues propelled him into politics.

His wife, Rose Milczyn, is a former municipal civil servant who was appointed to Toronto City Council in August 2022 as a temporary caretaker councillor following the resignation of Michael Ford.

== Politics ==
=== Municipal ===
Milczyn ran for a seat on the Etobicoke city council in 1991. He came third behind winner Alex Faulkner. He ran again in 1994 and beat out eight other contenders in Ward 2 after Faulkner retired from politics.

In 1993, he became president of Etobicoke—Lakeshore Liberal Party riding association. He quit this position, however, when then Liberal Party leader Jean Chrétien appointed Jean Augustine to run as the party's candidate in the riding in the 1993 Canadian federal election. This decision overrode his association's recommendation of Mary Sopta as the candidate. The Liberal party felt that Sopta's Serbo-Croatian background would create tension. Milczyn characterized that as "racist". Milczyn complained that Augustine was being appointed as the Liberal candidate only because she was black. He said, "It's only a factor with me inasmuch as it upsets me that they're using it (color) as a factor."

With the merger of Etobicoke and other municipalities to form the new City of Toronto, he ran, but failed to win a seat on Toronto city council in 1997. In the 2000 municipal election he ran again and this time defeating incumbent Blake Kinahan in a close race. He backed John Tory for Mayor of Toronto in the 2003 municipal election.

=== Provincial ===
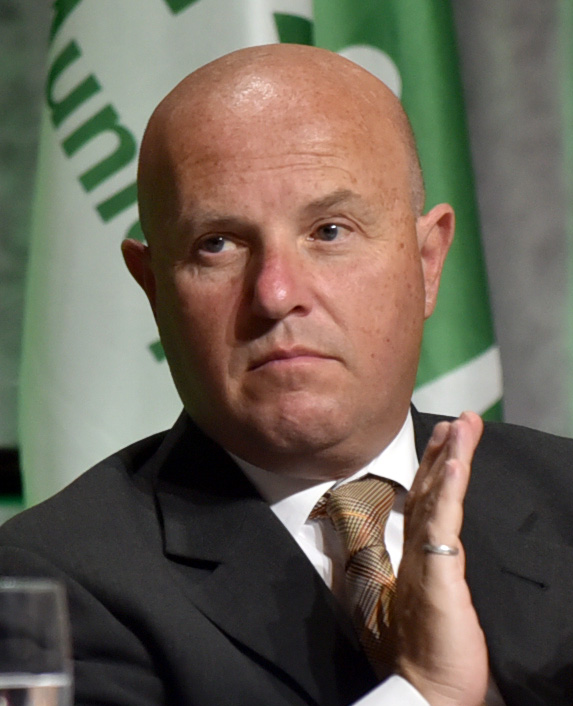
Peter Milczyn, pictured in 2017

Milczyn ran as the Liberal candidate in the Etobicoke—Lakeshore provincial by-election, caused by the resignation of Laurel Broten, which was held August 1, 2013. He was defeated by fellow Toronto councillor Doug Holyday, running for the Progressive Conservatives. In the 2014 general election he faced Holyday again this time defeating him by 6,548 votes.

He served as a Parliamentary Assistant to the Minister of Economic Development, Employment and Infrastructure.

On July 31, 2017, Milczyn was promoted to cabinet and appointed as Minister of Housing.

=== Cabinet positions ===
Wynne ministry, Province of Ontario (2013–2018)
Cabinet post (1)
Predecessor	Office	Successor
Chris Ballard	Minister of Housing; 2017 - 2018	Steve Clark

== Electoral record ==
2018 Ontario general election: Etobicoke—Lakeshore
Party	Candidate	Votes	%	±%
Progressive Conservative	Christine Hogarth	22,626	38.35	+4.25
New Democratic	Phil Trotter	19,401	32.89	+20.36
Liberal	Peter Milczyn	14,305	24.25	–23.34
Green	Chris Caldwell	2,138	3.62	–0.47
Libertarian	Mark Wrzesniewski	360	0.61	–
Moderate	Ian Lytvyn	163	0.28	–
Total valid votes		58,993	99.07	
Total rejected, unmarked and declined ballots		554	0.93	
Turnout		59,547	58.61	
Eligible voters		101,606		
Progressive Conservative notional gain from Liberal		Swing		–8.06
Source: Elections Ontario

2014 Ontario general election: Etobicoke—Lakeshore
Party	Candidate	Votes	%	±%
Liberal	Peter Milczyn	24,311	47.49	+5.19
Progressive Conservative	Doug Holyday	17,587	34.35	–12.40
New Democratic	P. C. Choo	6,362	12.43	+5.02
Green	Angela Salewsky	2,064	4.03	+1.78
Libertarian	Mark Wrzesniewski	336	0.66	+0.21
Socialist	Natalie Lochwin	236	0.46	–
Freedom	Jeff Merklinger	189	0.37	+0.24
Moderate	Ian Lytvyn	108	0.21	–
Total valid votes		51,193	98.94	
Total rejected, unmarked and declined ballots		548	1.06	+0.44
Turnout		51,741	53.73	+15.77
Eligible voters		96,304		
Liberal gain from Progressive Conservative		Swing		+8.80
Source: Elections Ontario

Ontario provincial by-election, August 1, 2013: Etobicoke—Lakeshore Resignation of Laurel Broten
Party	Candidate	Votes	%	±%
Progressive Conservative	Doug Holyday	16,034	46.75	+17.51
Liberal	Peter Milczyn	14,506	42.30	–8.73
New Democratic	P. C. Choo	2,542	7.41	–8.04
Green	Angela Salewsky	771	2.25	–0.43
Special Needs	Dan King	157	0.46	–
Libertarian	Hans Kunov	152	0.44	+0.05
People's Political Party	Kevin Clarke	87	0.25	–
Freedom	Wayne Simmons	46	0.13	–0.27
Total valid votes		34,295	99.38	
Total rejected, unmarked and declined ballots		214	0.62	+0.04
Turnout		34,509	37.95	–12.06
Eligible voters		90,927		
Progressive Conservative gain from Liberal		Swing		+13.12
Source: Elections Ontario Police detective Steve Ryan had originally been nominated by the Progressive Conservatives, however, according to party leader Tim Hudak, Ryan was unable to run in the by-election due to injuries sustained in a work related automobile accident; city councillor Doug Holyday was recruited to be the party's candidate instead.

2010 Toronto election, Ward 5
Candidate	Votes	%
Peter Milczyn	9,778	41.2
Justin Di Ciano	9,669	40.7
Morley Kells	2,725	11.5
John Chiappetta	1,245	5.2
Rob Therrien	339	1.4
Total	23,756	100

2006 Toronto election, Ward 5
Candidate	Votes	%
Peter Milczyn	8,501	55.8
Arthur Roszak	3,856	25.3
John Chiappetta	1,668	10.9
Joseph Mignone	1,021	6.7
Bojidar Tchernev	191	1.3
