= Lakeshore (provincial electoral district) =

Former provincial electoral district in Ontario, Canada

Ontario electoral district

Defunct provincial electoral district
- Legislature: Legislative Assembly of Ontario
- District created: 1963
- District abolished: 1987
- First contested: 1963
- Last contested: 1987

Demographics
- Census division: Toronto
- Census subdivision: Toronto

Lakeshore was a provincial electoral district in Ontario, Canada, that elected members to the Legislative Assembly of Ontario. It was roughly located in southern Etobicoke It existed from 1963 to 1987 when it was abolished into Etobicoke—Lakeshore.

== Members of Provincial Parliament ==
Lakeshore
Assembly	Years	Member	Party
Created from York West and York—Humber ridings in 1963
27th	1963–1967	Alan Eagleson	Progressive Conservative
28th	1967–1971	Patrick Lawlor	New Democratic
29th	1971–1975	Patrick Lawlor	New Democratic
30th	1975–1977	Patrick Lawlor	New Democratic
31st	1977–1981	Patrick Lawlor	New Democratic
32nd	1981–1985	Al Kolyn	Progressive Conservative
33rd	1985–1987	Ruth Grier	New Democratic
Sourced from the Ontario Legislative Assembly
Merged into Etobicoke—Lakeshore riding in 1987

== Electoral results ==
1985 Ontario general election
Party	Candidate	Votes	%	±%
New Democratic	Ruth Grier	11,539	39.89	+3.97
Liberal	Frank Sgarlata	9,502	32.85	+10.86
Progressive Conservative	Al Kolyn	7,886	27.26	–13.38
Total valid votes		28,927	99.46	
Total rejected ballots		157	0.54	–0.32
Turnout		29,084	67.83	+6.99
Eligible voters		42,877		
New Democratic gain from Progressive Conservative		Swing		+8.68
Source: Elections Ontario

1981 Ontario general election
Party	Candidate	Votes	%	±%
Progressive Conservative	Al Kolyn	10,607	40.65	+10.77
New Democratic	Don Sullivan	9,375	35.93	–13.83
Liberal	Bill Whelton	5,738	21.99	+4.04
Communist	Gordon Flowers	376	1.44	–0.97
Total valid votes		26,096	99.14	
Total rejected ballots		227	0.86	+0.24
Turnout		26,323	60.84	–1.43
Eligible voters		43,264		
Progressive Conservative gain from New Democratic		Swing		+12.30
Source: Elections Ontario

1977 Ontario general election
Party	Candidate	Votes	%	±%
New Democratic	Patrick Lawlor	13,252	49.76	–1.26
Progressive Conservative	Al Kolyn	7,957	29.88	+7.42
Liberal	Carl Weinsheimer	4,781	17.95	–5.81
Communist	Gordon Flowers	643	2.41	+0.26
Total valid votes		26,633	99.38	
Total rejected ballots		166	0.62	–0.02
Turnout		26,799	62.27	–3.38
Eligible voters		43,035		
New Democratic hold		Swing		–4.34
Source: Elections Ontario

1975 Ontario general election
Party	Candidate	Votes	%	±%
New Democratic	Patrick Lawlor	14,271	51.01	+8.65
Liberal	John McPhee	6,646	23.76	+5.62
Progressive Conservative	Helen Wursta	6,281	22.45	–17.05
Communist	Neil McLellan	602	2.15	–
North American Labour	Fred Haight	175	0.63	–
Total valid votes		27,975	99.36	
Total rejected ballots		181	0.64	+0.07
Turnout		28,156	65.65	–9.77
Eligible voters		42,889		
New Democratic hold		Swing		+1.52
Source: Elections Ontario

1971 Ontario general election
Party	Candidate	Votes	%	±%
New Democratic	Patrick Lawlor	10,867	42.36	–6.09
Progressive Conservative	Morley Kells	10,132	39.50	+5.50
Liberal	David J. Sandford	4,653	18.14	+0.59
Total valid votes		25,652	99.42	
Total rejected ballots		149	0.58	–0.21
Turnout		25,801	75.42	+11.03
Eligible voters		34,212		
New Democratic hold		Swing		–5.80
Source: Elections Ontario

1967 Ontario general election
Party	Candidate	Votes	%	±%
New Democratic	Patrick Lawlor	10,029	48.45	+23.14
Progressive Conservative	Alan Eagleson	7,036	33.99	–9.32
Liberal	James Cottrell	3,633	17.55	–11.99
Total valid votes		20,698	99.21	
Total rejected ballots		165	0.79	–0.08
Turnout		20,863	64.39	+2.24
Eligible voters		32,401		
New Democratic gain from Progressive Conservative		Swing		+17.56
Source: Elections Ontario

1963 Ontario general election
Party	Candidate	Votes	%
Progressive Conservative	Alan Eagleson	8,598	43.32
Liberal	David J. Sandford	5,863	29.54
New Democratic	Murray Cotterill	5,024	25.31
Communist	James Davis	364	1.83
Total valid votes		19,849	99.13
Total rejected ballots		175	0.87
Turnout		20,024	62.15
Eligible voters		32,218	
Progressive Conservative pickup new district.			
Source: Elections Ontario

== See also ==
- List of Ontario provincial electoral districts
- Canadian provincial electoral districts
