= Ruth Grier =

Canadian politician (born 1936)

The Honourable Ruth Anna Grier ECO
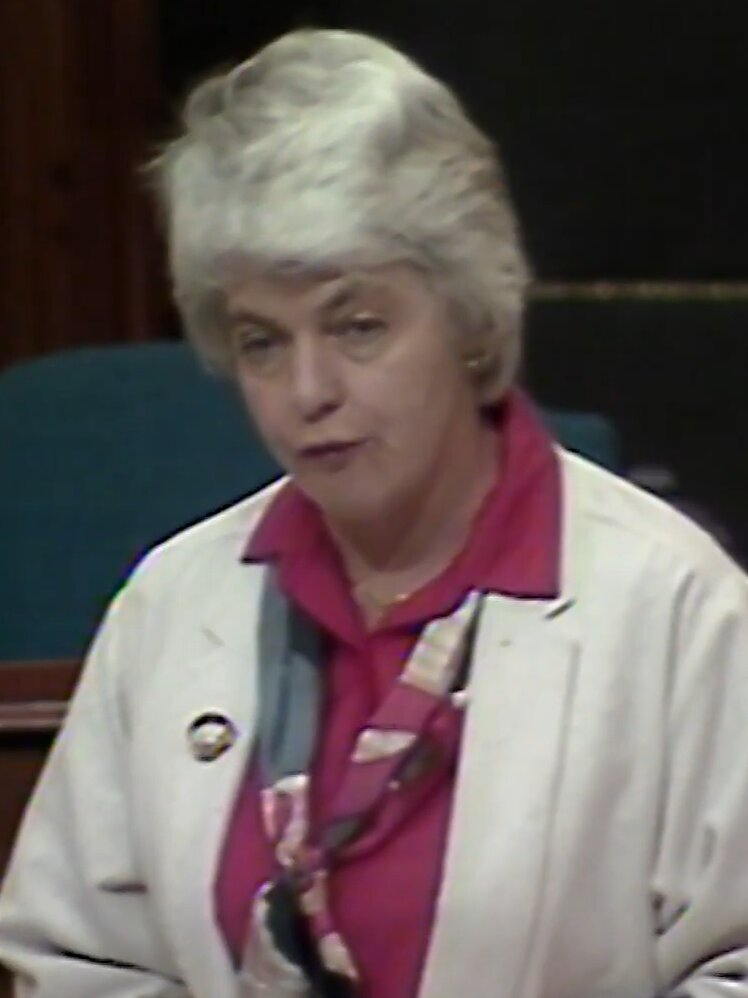
- Grier in 1986

Ontario MPP
- In office 1987–1995
- Preceded by: New riding
- Succeeded by: Morley Kells
- Constituency: Etobicoke—Lakeshore
- In office 1985–1987
- Preceded by: Al Kolyn
- Succeeded by: Riding abolished
- Constituency: Lakeshore

Etobicoke Alderman for Mimico
- In office 1969–1985
- Succeeded by: Helen Wursta

Personal details
- Born: Ruth Anna Dowds; 2 October 1936 (age 89) Dublin, Ireland
- Party: New Democrat
- Spouse: Terry Grier
- Children: 3
- Education: Trinity College, Dublin; Trinity College, Toronto
- Occupation: Administrator

Ruth Anna Grier (born 2 October 1936) is a Canadian former politician in Ontario. She was a New Democratic Party member of the Legislative Assembly of Ontario from 1985 to 1995 and served as a high-profile cabinet minister in the government of Bob Rae.

== Background ==
Grier grew up in Dublin, Ireland, and immigrated to Canada in 1956. Before leaving Dublin she obtained a degree in public administration at Trinity College. After arriving in Toronto she went to University of Trinity College at the University of Toronto and obtained degrees in Political Science and Economics. She and her husband, Terry Grier, have three children. Terry was a New Democratic Party member of the House of Commons of Canada from 1972 to 1974 and served as president of Ryerson Polytechnical Institute from 1988 to 1995.

== Politics ==
=== Municipal ===
Grier was elected as an alderman in the Mimico area in the borough of Etobicoke in 1969. (Note: Early reports mention her riding as Ward 5 but later reports mention Ward 1.) She beat her opponent Gordon Rush by 31 votes. She supported Walter Pitman for the 1970 Ontario NDP leadership race. Pitman came in second to Stephen Lewis. She remained in the position until 1985. In 1984 she put her name forward to replace Dennis Flynn as mayor of Etobicoke. Fellow alderman Bruce Sinclair was the eventual winner. She remained as alderman until 1985 when she ran for election in the provincial election.

=== Provincial ===
Grier ran as the NDP candidate in the riding of Lakeshore. She ran on a campaign criticizing Tory incumbent Al Kolyn of being lax on environmental issues and on the closing of the Lakeshore Psychiatric Hospital in 1979. She won the election defeating both second place Liberal candidate Frank Sgarlata by 2,037 votes and Kolyn who finished third. In June 1985, she was named as her party's Critic for the Environment, a post which she held until 1990. In December 1986, Grier proposed an Environmental Bill of Rights. Under her proposed legislation, private groups or individuals would be able to take a polluter to court even if they hadn't been personally affected by the pollution. Although the bill was introduced in 1986 and re-introduced in December 1987 and had previously been proposed and supported by the Liberals, the bill failed to move forward through the legislature.

The Liberals won a majority in the 1987 provincial election. Grier was re-elected, again defeating challengers Sgarlata and Kolyn. In January 1989, Grier sponsored a private member's bill that proposed to ban the sale of irradiated foods in Ontario. In March 1990, she proposed another private member's bill that would more strictly regulate businesses that stockpiled used tires. This came about due to a large tire fire in Hagersville, Ontario. This idea was adopted by the Liberal government in the form of a tax on tires that was targeted towards recycling programs, although, in the short term, it meant an increase in tires being sent to landfill.

=== In government ===
The NDP won a majority government in the 1990 provincial election and Grier won her riding handily. She was appointed as the Minister of the Environment on 1 October 1990. As Environment Minister, Grier cancelled plans to ship Toronto's garbage to a waste site in Durham, and vetoed a similar plan for Adams Mine in the northern community of Kirkland Lake. The government eventually authorized the creation of three new landfill sites near Toronto, one of which was located on prime farmland. Grier also set limits on the amount of chlorine that pulp and paper mills could dump into rivers and lakes, and rejected one particular downtown Toronto housing project on the grounds that removing industrial waste from the region was prohibitively expensive. She also introduced an Environmental Bill of Rights. The Bill of Rights gave Ontarians the right to sue polluters and it increased the protection for whistleblowing employees. It also created the office of Environmental Commissioner.

On 3 February 1993, she was transferred to the Ministry of Health. As Health Minister, Grier supported the listing of generic drugs over large pharmaceutical companies. In 1993, her government made a generous settlement with the province's doctors via an Interim Agreement of Economic Arrangements. Despite strong personal objections, she also introduced user fees for some drug coverage in the summer of 1993. Her government also introduced midwifery as a profession, targeted resources toward community health centres, created a Task Force on the Prevention of Cancer and introduced the Trillium Drug Plan.

Notwithstanding her efforts to pursue some traditional NDP policies while in government, Grier generally supported Bob Rae in his efforts to move the party to the political centre. In Bob Rae's memoir, From Protest to Power, he listed Grier as one of his top six closest associates.

The NDP were defeated in the 1995 provincial election, and Grier finished third in her bid for re-election in Etobicoke—Lakeshore, losing to Progressive Conservative Morley Kells.

=== Cabinet posts ===
Rae ministry, Province of Ontario (1990–1995)
Cabinet posts (2)
Predecessor	Office	Successor
Frances Lankin	Minister of Health; 1993–1995	Jim Wilson
Jim Bradley	Minister of the Environment; 1990–1993	Bud Wildman

== After politics ==
Afterwards, she was a regular panelist on Fourth Reading, on the TVOntario program Studio 2. (Note: There are several references for Grier's presence on Studio 2. One example is given.) In 2000, she along with her husband Terry both received honorary doctorates from Ryerson University. Grier was named Visiting Environmentalist at the University of Toronto in 1997, and remains involved in environmental concerns.
