= Ritch Winter =

Canadian sports agent

Ritch Winter (born January 23, 1957, in Edmonton, Alberta) is a Canadian ice hockey sports agent. He is the founder and former CEO of The Sports Corporation, based in Edmonton. Winter currently owns Raze Sports, which represents around 40 National Hockey League players, including Marian Hossa, Mark Giordano, and Tomas Tatar.

== Biography ==
Winter received a law degree from the University of Calgary in 1983. He began his career as a sports agent in the late 1980s in California before returning to Edmonton to launch The Sports Corporation. While in California, Winter worked with sports lawyer Ted Steinberg, whose clients at that time included Eugene Levy and Kareem Abdul-Jabbar, among others.

Winter played a role in the downfall of former National Hockey League Players' Association Executive Director Alan Eagleson. Alongside Herb Pinder and Ron Salcer, he helped to lead the campaign that led to Eagleson's resignation in 1992, and ultimately his conviction for defrauding his clients in 1989. In 2007, Winter helped Chris Chelios oust Ted Saskin as NHLPA director following accusations that Saskin was monitoring players' email. Winter was highly critical of the investigation into the issue by the Toronto Police Service.

In addition to helping to bring the National Hockey League Players' Association leadership to account, Winter worked tirelessly at Carl Brewer's request to help restore retired NHL players' pension organizing an effort on behalf of Gordie Howe, Eddie Shack, Bobby Orr, Bobby Hull, and others, which ultimately resulted in retired players receiving $50 million from the NHL in an Ontario Court decision. Chicago's Rinkside magazine once referred to him as the game's "first player agent superstar".
