= Patrick Lawlor (politician) =

Canadian politician (1923–1993)

Pat Lawlor

Ontario MPP
- In office 1967–1981
- Preceded by: Alan Eagleson
- Succeeded by: Al Kolyn
- Constituency: Lakeshore

Personal details
- Born: November 16, 1923 Edmonton, Alberta
- Died: March 28, 1993 (aged 69) Toronto, Ontario
- Party: New Democrat
- Spouse: Leslie
- Children: 4
- Occupation: Lawyer

Patrick Daniel Lawlor (November 16, 1923 – March 28, 1993) was a Canadian politician who served as the Ontario New Democratic Party Member of the Legislative Assembly of Ontario for the Toronto riding of Lakeshore from 1967 to 1981.

== Background ==
Lawlor was born in Edmonton, Alberta in 1923. He and his family moved to Toronto, Ontario when he was 7 years old. He graduated from the University of St. Michael's College at the University of Toronto and then earned a law degree from the University of Toronto Law School and opened a law practice in Long Branch, Ontario, which later became part of Etobicoke. He earned his PhD in the 1960s.

In 1979, he published a book of poetry called the psychotic personality of our time, (Note: Book title was published with all lower case letters.) and also wrote an unpublished play. He and his wife Leslie raised four children. They lived in New Toronto.

=== the psychotic personality of our time ===
Lawlor's book of poetry consists of 50 poems named and numbered Canto I - Canto L using Roman numerals. Lawlor characterized the book as philosophical poetry. He said in the preface, "The world of symbols... that pre-reflective almost inarticulate knowledge found in myth - those ancient stories of our coming to ourselves; the dense, opaque, wonder-full sometimes terrifying world, which we all inhabit, but have lost or forgotten." In a book dedication he called the writing of the book, "a distillation of a peculiar experience - a learning - an end which is also a beginning."

== Politics ==
Lawlor ran for the federal NDP in the 1962 federal election and again in 1963 in the riding of Peel. He was defeated both times placing third behind Liberal incumbent Bruce Beer.

In 1967 he ran again, this time at the provincial level, and was successful by defeating Progressive Conservative MPP Alan Eagleson to win the Lakeshore seat in the 1967 provincial election. He was subsequently re-elected in the 1971, 1975 and 1977 provincial elections. Lawlor served as the NDP's justice critic and, briefly, finance critic. He retired at the 1981 provincial election but attempted to return to politics three years later running as the federal NDP candidate in Etobicoke—Lakeshore but was defeated, placing third behind Progressive Conservative Patrick Boyer.

Lawlor was friends with Ontario Premier John Robarts despite their different political allegiances.

Stephen Lewis, who led the NDP for part of Lawlor's tenure, described him as having an "analytical, insightful and outrageous style."

== Later life ==
After leaving the legislature, Lawlor was commissioned to investigate legal reforms surrounding hate speech by attorney-general Roy McMurtry. His report, issued in 1984, advocated allowing parties to seek relief in court or before the Ontario Human Rights Commission by using a class action.

After suffering a heart attack, Lawlor was rushed to St. Joseph's Health Centre in Toronto where he died shortly after.

== Electoral record ==
1984 Canadian federal election: Etobicoke—Lakeshore
Party	Candidate	Votes	%	±%
Progressive Conservative	Patrick Boyer	19,902	44.8	+14.7
Liberal	Ken Robinson	13,455	30.3	-10.5
New Democratic	Pat Lawlor	10,549	23.7	-4.6
Libertarian	Monica Cain	317	0.7	+0.2
Communist	Peter Boychuck	216	0.5	
Total valid votes		44,439	100.0	
