= Al Kolyn =

Canadian politician (1932–2024)

Ontario MPP
- In office 1981–1985
- Preceded by: Patrick Lawlor
- Succeeded by: Ruth Grier
- Constituency: Lakeshore

Personal details
- Born: Albert Kolyn; November 13, 1932 Fort William, Ontario, Canada
- Died: January 17, 2024 (aged 91)
- Party: Progressive Conservative
- Occupation: Businessman

Albert Kolyn (November 13, 1932 – January 17, 2024) was a Canadian politician in Ontario. He served in the Legislative Assembly of Ontario from 1981 to 1985 as a member of the Progressive Conservative Party.

== Background ==
Kolyn was born in Fort William, and was educated in the city. He later moved to Toronto, where he worked as a businessman. Kolyn was an active freemason, and a member of the Ukrainian National Federation. He died on January 17, 2024, at the age of 91.

== Politics ==
Kolyn ran for the Ontario legislature in the 1977 provincial election, and lost to Pat Lawlor of the New Democratic Party (NDP) by 5,295 votes in Lakeshore. He then contested Etobicoke—Lakeshore in the 1979 federal election as a candidate of the Progressive Conservative Party of Canada, and lost to Liberal Ken Robinson by only 747 votes in a close three-way race. He campaigned federally again in the 1980 election, and this time lost to Robinson by 4,694 votes.

Kolyn was elected to the Ontario legislature in the 1981 provincial election, defeating NDP newcomer Don Sullivan by 1,232 votes. He served as a backbench supporter of the William Davis and Frank Miller ministries for the next four years.

The Progressive Conservatives lost several seats in the 1985 provincial election, and Kolyn was personally defeated in Lakeshore. He finished third out of three candidates, losing to New Democrat Ruth Grier by 3,653 votes. He attempted a comeback in the 1987 election, and finished a distant third against Grier.

== Electoral record ==
1980 Canadian federal election: Etobicoke—Lakeshore
Party	Candidate	Votes	%	±%
Liberal	Ken Robinson	17,903	40.8	+6.1
Progressive Conservative	Al Kolyn	13,209	30.1	-3.0
New Democratic	Terry Meagher	12,405	28.3	-2.6
Libertarian	Stephen Kimish	247	0.6	-0.2
Marxist–Leninist	Diane Waldman	88	0.2	0.0
Total valid votes		43,852	100.0	
lop.parl.ca

1979 Canadian federal election: Etobicoke—Lakeshore
Party	Candidate	Votes	%	±%
Liberal	Ken Robinson	15,791	34.7	-5.4
Progressive Conservative	Al Kolyn	15,044	33.1	+9.2
New Democratic	Terry Meagher	14,044	30.9	-4.5
Libertarian	Sheldon Gold	349	0.8	
Communist	Tom Morris	169	0.4	0.0
Marxist–Leninist	Diane Waldman	72	0.2	0.0
Total valid votes		45,469	100.0	
