= Ontario Moderate Party =

Provincial political party in Canada

- Active provincial party
- Leader: Yuri Duboisky
- President: Ihor Nesterenko
- Founded: 2014
- Headquarters: 21567 McCowan Rd; Mount Albert, Ontario; L0G 1M0
- Ideology: Centrism; Economic liberalism
- Colours: Navy blue
- Seats in Legislature: 0 / 124

Website
- ontariomoderate.com

The Ontario Moderate Party is a minor centrist political party in Ontario, Canada founded in 2014. The party's stated foci are improving manufacturing and industry in Ontario, reducing taxes, promoting healthy eating, decriminalizing marijuana, and promoting renewable energy.

OMP nominated two candidates in the 2014 provincial election; party leader Yuri Duboisky ran in the riding of Richmond Hill and Ian Lytvyn ran in the riding of Etobicoke—Lakeshore. Neither candidate gained a seat in the Legislative Assembly of Ontario and the party received approximately 0.01% of the popular vote. In the 2018 Provincial Election, the party ran 16 candidates. The party won no seats and it received approximately 0.04% of the vote province wide. The party failed to win any seats in the 2022 Ontario general election.

== Election results ==
Election results
Election year	No. of overall votes	% of overall total	No. of candidates run	No. of seats won	+/−	Government
2014	295	0.01	2	0 / 107	New Party	Extra-parliamentary
2018	2,191	0.04	16	0 / 124	Steady	Extra-parliamentary
2022	1,645	<0.00	17	0 / 124	Steady	Extra-parliamentary
2025	2,181	0.04	12	0 / 124	Steady	Extra-parliamentary
