= List of Université Laval people =

This is a list of people associated with Université Laval.

== Notable alumni ==
=== Artists and media personalities ===
- Victor Bouchard, pianist and composer
- Édith Butler, Acadian singer
- Christiane Chabot, artist
- Claude Lagacé, organist
- Gaston Miron, poet and author
- Renée Morisset, pianist
- Ben Mulroney, television host and son of former prime minister Brian Mulroney
- Gilles Vigneault, artist

=== Athletes ===
- Boris Bede, gridiron football player
- Pierre Harvey, Olympic cyclist and cross-country skier
- Pierre Lavertu, CFL player
- Ed Millaire, professional hockey player, Montreal Canadiens
- Abi Tripp, Paralympic swimmer

=== Business leaders ===
- Marcel Aubut, president of the Canadian Olympic Committee
- Conrad Black, former media magnate
- Sophie Brochu, President and CEO of Gaz Métro/Énergir and Hydro-Québec.
- Manon Brouillette, President and CEO of Videotron
- Richard Fortin (born 1949/50), former chairman of Couche-Tard
- Louis Garneau, businessman and Olympic cyclist
- Marc Laliberté, CEO of Via Rail Canada
- Jean Leclerc, chairman, Leclerc biscuits and former provincial politician
- Charles Sirois, businessman and venture capitalist
- Alain Ouzilleau, Owner and President of Cabico & co

=== Political leaders ===
==== Canadian ====
- Prime Ministers of Canada Louis St. Laurent, Brian Mulroney and Jean Chrétien
- Premiers of Quebec Lucien Bouchard, Pierre-Joseph-Olivier Chauveau, Edmund James Flynn, Jean Lesage, René Lévesque, Pauline Marois, Simon-Napoléon Parent and Louis-Alexandre Taschereau
- Jean-Martin Aussant, former leader of Option nationale party
- Jean Bazin, senator
- Louise Beaudoin, former minister in Quebec
- Lawrence Cannon, Canadian Minister of Foreign Affairs, 2008–2011
- Thomas Chapais, lawyer and federal politician
- Raoul Dandurand, lawyer, federal politician, diplomat, president of the League of Nations Assembly for 1925
- Stéphane Dion, diplomat and former politician; former leader of the Liberal Party of Canada
- Gilbert Finn, 26th Lieutenant Governor of New Brunswick
- Eugène Fiset, former Surgeon General of Canada, 18th Lieutenant Governor of Quebec
- Michael Fortier, former senator
- Wilfrid Gariépy, Alberta cabinet minister
- Clement Gignac, politician, former Quebec Minister of Economic Development, Innovation and Export Trade and chief economist at Industrial Alliance
- Daniel Joseph Greene, Premier of Newfoundland, 1894–95
- Michael Meighen, former senator
- Charles Milliard
- Rodney Ouellette, senator and physician-scientist
- Christian Paradis
- Louis J. Robichaud, 24th premier of New Brunswick
- Raymond C. Setlakwe, senator
- Arthur Tremblay, senator

==== Senior public servants ====
- Johanne Bélisle, former Commissioner of Patents, Registrar of Trademarks and Chief Executive Officer of the Canadian Intellectual Property Office (CIPO)
- Raymond Chrétien, former diplomat and lawyer
- Ernest Côté, diplomat and civil servant.
- Nathalie Drouin, diplomat and civil servant.
- Marc Lortie, diplomat
- Gérard Veilleux, former senior civil servant, president of the Canadian Broadcasting Corporation (1989–1993)
- Jennie Carignan, Chief of the Defence Staff

==== Foreign ====
- Archduke Carl Ludwig of Austria (1918–2007)
- Archduchess Charlotte of Austria, social worker and royal heiress
- Archduke Rudolf of Austria (1919–2010)
- Mahamat Ali Adoum, permanent representative of Chad to the United Nations; former Minister of foreign affairs (1992–93)
- Jacques-Édouard Alexis, prime minister of Haiti, 1999–2001 and 2006–2008
- Carme Chacón, Spanish Minister of Defence, 2008–2011
- Habiba Zehi Ben Romdhane, Tunisian Minister of health
- Jean, Grand Duke of Luxembourg
- Pearlette Louisy, Governess-General of Saint Lucia, 1997-2017

=== Jurists ===
- Supreme Court Justices Suzanne Côté, Louis LeBel, Claire L'Heureux-Dubé, Charles Fitzpatrick, Arthur Cyrille Albert Malouin, Lawrence Arthur Dumoulin Cannon, Louis-Philippe Pigeon, Julien Chouinard, Robert Taschereau, Henri-Elzéar Taschereau, Thibaudeau Rinfret
- Marcel Crête (fr), jurist and former Chief Justice of Quebec (1980–88)
- Léon Gérin, lawyer and president of the Royal Society of Canada
- Paule Gauthier, lawyer, arbitrator, corporate director, former chair of the Security Intelligence Review Committee 1996–2004
- Frederick Edmund Meredith, lawyer and businessman, 8th chancellor of Bishop's University
- Adolphe-Basile Routhier, judge and writer

=== Public intellectuals and academics ===
- Fabrisia Ambrosio, academic
- Gérard Bouchard, academic and public intellectual
- Thomas De Koninck, philosopher
- Micheline Dumont (historian), historian
- Gustave Guillaume, linguist, philologist and Volney Prize laureate
- Valérie Harvey, writer and sociologist
- Yolande Henderson, Pakistani high school teacher
- Richard Hotte, professor of information technology at Université TÉLUQ and current UNESCO Chair in Global Smart Disruptive Learning
- Luc Langlois, philosopher, Ordre des Palmes Académiques laureate, Dean of the Faculty of Philosophy, 2002-2010
- Georges Larivière, researcher, writer, ice hockey coach
- Laurent Picard, academic, former president of the Canadian Broadcasting Corporation
- Rodrigue Tremblay, economist
- Niklaus Wirth, computer scientist, Turing Award winner

=== Religious leaders ===
- Louis-Nazaire Bégin, Canadian Cardinal of the Roman Catholic Church
- Charles Sandwith Campbell, benefactor of Montreal; Governor of McGill University
- Gérald Lacroix, ISPX, cardinal, archbishop of the Roman Catholic Archdiocese of Quebec and Primate of Canada
- Marc Ouellet, cardinal, prefect of the Congregation for Bishops and president of the Pontifical Commission for Latin America

=== Scientists and physicians ===
- Albéric Boivin, physicist known for his work in optics and lasers
- Claire Deschênes, mechanical engineer and professor of engineering at Laval
- Paul Fiset, microbiologist and developer of the Q fever vaccine
- Paul-Antoine Giguère, physical chemist
- Jean-Charles Gille, engineer, psychiatrist and professor of medicine.
- Larkin Kerwin, physicist, first president of the Canadian Space Agency, 1989–1992
- Fernand Labrie, physician and medical researcher
- Louis de Lotbiniere-Harwood, Dean of Medicine at Université de Montréal; President of the Hôpital Notre-Dame
- Paul Marmet, physicist
- Aimé Pelletier, surgeon; under pen name Bertrand Vac, influential Quebec novelist, particularly in the 1950s
- Ouida Ramón-Moliner, first female anaesthetist at Université Laval
- Franco Rasetti, physicist and founding chairman of the Laval physics department, 1939–1947
- Jean-Paul Richard, physicist, academic and researcher
- Nicole Roy, professor of human nutrition in New Zealand
- David Saint-Jacques, astrophysicist and astronaut for the Canadian Space Agency
- David Servan-Schreiber, physician and author
- Réjean Thomas (fr), physician and founder of the Canadian division of Médecins du Monde

=== Rhodes Scholars ===
- Marius Barbeau 1910
- Edgar Rochette 1914
- Roger Gaudry 1937
- Julien Chouinard 1951
- Thomas De Koninck 1956
- Gregory Kates 1966
- Jean-François Garneau 1982
- Leo Bureau-Blouin 2016

== Recipients of honorary degrees ==
Approximately 1100 honorary doctorates have been granted since 1864. Some notable recipients are:

- Janette Bertrand, journalist and feminist
- Lise Bissonnette, journalist and civil servant
- Marie-Claire Blais, writer
- Henri-Raymond Casgrain, historian and priest
- Céline Dion, singer
- Maurice Duplessis, 16th Premier of Quebec
- Germaine Guèvremont, writer
- Adélard Godbout, 15th Premier of Quebec
- Marc-André Hamelin, pianist
- Anne Hébert, writer
- Guy Laliberté, Cirque du Soleil founder
- Jean Lesage, 19th Premier of Quebec
- Julie Payette, astronaut
- Paul Sauvé, 17th Premier of Quebec
- Yoav Talmi, conductor
- Gilles Vigneault, poet and singer

== Rectors ==
There has been 25 rectors since the granting of university status in 1852.

- 1852–1860 M. l'abbé Louis-Jacques Casault
- 1860–1866 M. l'abbé Elzéar-Alexandre Taschereau
- 1866–1869 Mgr Michel-Édouard Méthot
- 1869–1871 M. l'abbé Elzéar-Alexandre Taschereau
- 1871–1880 Mgr Thomas-Étienne Hamel
- 1880–1883 Mgr Michel-Édouard Méthot
- 1883–1886 Mgr Thomas-Étienne Hamel
- 1886–1887 Mgr Michel-Édouard Méthot
- 1887–1893 Mgr Benjamin Pâquet
- 1893–1899 Mgr Joseph-Clovis-Kemner Laflamme
- 1899–1908 Mgr Olivier-E. Mathieu
- 1908–1909 Mgr Joseph-Clovis-Kemner Laflamme
- 1909–1915 Mgr Amédée-Edmond Gosselin
- 1915–1921 Mgr François Pelletier
- 1921 M. l'abbé Pierre Hébert
- 1921–1924 Mgr Charles-Napoléon Gariépy
- 1924–1927 Mgr Camille Roy
- 1927–1929 Mgr Amédée-Edmond Gosselin
- 1929 Mgr Camille Roy
- 1929–1932 Mgr Philéas-J. Filion
- 1932–1938 Mgr Camille Roy
- 1938–1939 Mgr Arthur Robert
- 1939–1940 Mgr Alexandre Vachon
- 1940–1943 Mgr Camille Roy
- 1943–1945 Mgr Cyrille Gagnon
- 1945–1954 Mgr Ferdinand Vandry
- 1954–1960 Mgr Alphonse-Marie Parent
- 1960–1972 Mgr Louis-Albert Vachon
- 1972–1977 Larkin Kerwin
- 1977–1987 Jean-Guy Paquet
- 1987–1997 Michel Gervais
- 1997–2002 François Tavenas
- 2002–2007 Michel Pigeon
- 2007–2017 Denis Brière
- 2017–present Sophie D'Amours
