= List of rectors of Université Laval =

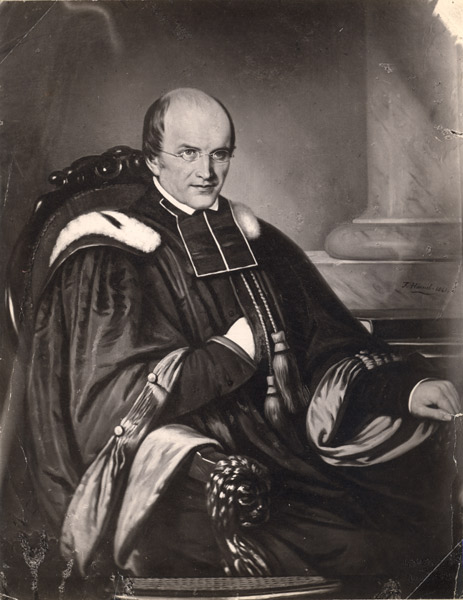
Louis-Jacques Casault, rector of Université Laval, 1852 - 1860

- 1852–1860 M. l'abbé Louis-Jacques Casault
- 1860–1866 M. l'abbé Elzéar-Alexandre Taschereau
- 1866–1869 Mgr Michel-Édouard Méthot
- 1869–1871 M. l'abbé Elzéar-Alexandre Taschereau
- 1871–1880 Mgr Thomas-Étienne Hamel
- 1880–1883 Mgr Michel-Édouard Méthot
- 1883–1886 Mgr Thomas-Étienne Hamel
- 1886–1887 Mgr Michel-Édouard Méthot
- 1887–1893 Mgr Benjamin Pâquet
- 1893–1899 Mgr Joseph-Clovis-Kemner Laflamme
- 1899–1908 Mgr Olivier-E. Mathieu
- 1908–1909 Mgr Joseph-Clovis-Kemner Laflamme
- 1909–1915 Mgr Amédée-Edmond Gosselin
- 1915–1921 Mgr François Pelletier
- 1921 M. l'abbé Pierre Hébert
- 1921–1924 Mgr Charles-Napoléon Gariépy
- 1924–1927 Mgr Camille Roy
- 1927–1929 Mgr Amédée-Edmond Gosselin
- 1929 Mgr Camille Roy
- 1929–1932 Mgr Philéas-J. Filion
- 1932–1938 Mgr Camille Roy
- 1938–1939 Mgr Arthur Robert
- 1939–1940 Mgr Alexandre Vachon
- 1940–1943 Mgr Camille Roy
- 1943–1945 Mgr Cyrille Gagnon
- 1945–1954 Mgr Ferdinand Vandry
- 1954–1960 Mgr Alphonse-Marie Parent
- 1960–1972 Mgr Louis-Albert Vachon
- 1972–1977 Larkin Kerwin
- 1977–1987 Jean-Guy Paquet
- 1987–1997 Michel Gervais
- 1997–2002 François Tavenas
- 2002–2007 Michel Pigeon
- 2007–2017 Denis Brière
- 2017–present Sophie D'Amours

== See also ==
- Université Laval
