= Second Congress on the French Language in Canada =

1937 convention in Quebec City, Canada

The Second Congress on the French Language in Canada (French: Deuxième Congrès de la langue française au Canada) was held at Université Laval in Quebec City from June 27 to July 1, 1937. The 8,000 congress members concluded the event with the formulation of 46 vows.

== Organization ==
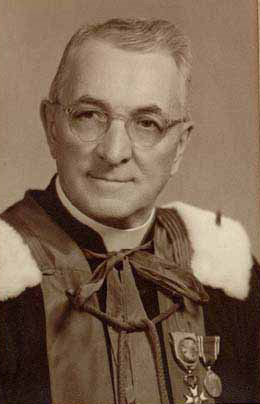
Camille Roy, rector of Université Laval and president of the Second Congress on the French Language in Canada.

To commemorate the 25th anniversary of the Congress of 1912, the Société du parler français organized a second congress in Quebec City between June 27 and July 1, 1937.

This second congress used the same formula as that of the first congress, with the exception that it was not planned to coincide with the festivities of the French-Canadian National Day, but rather shortly after. The theme of the second congress was: "The French spirit in Canada, in our language, our laws, our habits" (L'esprit français au Canada, dans notre langue, dans nos lois, dans nos mœurs).

The organizing committee of the Congress, set up by the Société du parler français on May 8, 1936, was presided by Mgr Camille Roy, president of the Society and rector of Université Laval. It is also Camille Roy who presided the executive office of the organizing committee. The executive office set up committees on finance, propaganda, reception, and religious ceremony as well as various sub-committees.

An honorary committee was instituted to add to the prestige of the event. The members of this committee were the most visible State and Church officials of Quebec: the archbishop of Quebec Jean-Marie-Rodrigue Villeneuve as patron of the Congress; the Lieutenant Governor of Quebec Ésioff-Léon Patenaude as honorary president; the premier of Quebec Maurice Duplessis, the federal minister of justice Ernest Lapointe and the mayor of Quebec Joseph-Ernest Grégoire as honorary vice-presidents.

The Académie française delegated the novelist and essayist Louis Bertrand to the event.

In virtue of article III of the rules of the Congress, were invited to participate all "French Canadians, Acadians and Franco-Americans" and their various institutions, admitted as either protective members, beneficiary members, donating members, or fellow members. "Foreign persons or corporations" could also adhere to the Congress with the title of observer. Delegates from Haïti were in fact present to the event.

Upon registering, congress members received a membership card granting room access, a copy of the programme and the ribbon of the Congress. It was also possible to buy a button of the Congress for 10 cents and a badge medal (the work of Marius Plamondon) for 75 cents.

The sessions of the Congress were held at the Colisée de Québec, in several buildings of Université Laval, at the Palais de Justice de Québec and the Palais Montcalm.

== Progression ==
The programme of the Congress of 1937 closely resembled that of 1912, but was more sophisticated. Contained within a general programme of six days, from Sunday June 27 to Friday July 2, which included masses, breakfasts, receptions, banquets and concerts, tours, there was a programme of six public sessions, two general assemblies, 23 sessions by the four study sections, and diverse special programmes (children day, ladies day, youth day).

The study sessions of the Congress of 1937
Section on spoken language
President: Cyrille-F. Delâge; Secretary: Lucien Talbot; Reporter: Étienne Blanchard
Section on written language
President: Aegidius Fauteux; Secretary: Henri Lallier; Reporter: Maurice Hébert
Section on the arts
President: J.-B. Soucy; Secretary: Sylvia Daoust; Reporter: Jean-Marie Gauvreau
Section on laws
President: Fabre-Surveyer, Henri Lacerte, Antonio Perreault; Secretary: Jacques Dumoulin; Reporter: L.-Philippe Pigeon
Section on habits
Division A:	Division B:
President: P. Henri Martin; Secretary : P.-Eugène Gosselin; Reporter: Henri-G. Renaud	President: J.-M. Laframboise; Secretary: Josaphat Benoit; Reporter: Pie-M. Gaudreau
Ladies study sessions
President: Mme Charles Frémont; Secretary: Mme J. Dugal; Reporter: Mlle Élise Rocheleau
Youth study sessions
President: Cyrille Gagnon; Secretary: Mlle Jeanne Lapointe; Reporter: M. Paul-Henri Guimont

== Vows ==
The Second Congress of the French Language in Canada concluded with the adoption of 46 vows.

The seven vows of the language section expressed the desire of congress members to see that the phonetic and elocution of the students' speech improve by their methodical teaching and by the particular care which teachers must give to their own diction; that a program of studies on the spoken language of Franco-Americans be set up; that a greater number of local and regional history societies be founded; that libraries be more numerous and more furnished; that the language of advertising improve and be in proper French; that scientific reviews be better supported and encouraged; that a Board on the French language in Canada (Office de la langue française au Canada) be set up, with the mandate to examine and correct commercial signs, posters, and brochures.

The three vows of the arts section pertained to the promotion of art appreciation among workers by conferences, projections, etc.; that the culture of letters be developed, especially by encouraging "our own writers"; that the teaching of drawing be developed in schools.

The five wishes of the section on laws dealt with the conservation of the French spirit of laws and interpretation methods; that a commission be set up to revise all laws of Quebec to conform to the French spirit, in a concise, logical and methodical redaction; that the translation of federal laws (which were all in English) improve and that translations "no longer be restrained to literal translation"; that the rights of the French language be recognized in all of Canada and that the rights of francophone minorities to preserve their language by learning it in school be recognized in all of North America;

The other vows (from the 16th to 46th) were formulated by the section on habits and pertained to the promotion of professional associations, parish schools in the United States, the quality of French in the press and radio, solidarity among francophone groups, the organization of a Congress on Economics, the creation of a linguistic information office (terminology, translation), that Canada and Haïti establish press relations to better know each other, as well as items dear to the catholic clergy: fighting communism and discouraging marriage between Catholics and Protestants.

The participants to the ladies session wished that taste for poetry be cultivated among the young people, that French-language feminine associations be created in Canada and the United States, that the education of women be modernized, that children literature be developed, etc. The participants to the youth session wished that libraries contain books appropriate to young age and also that youth movements develop.

On the first of July, the Permanent Committee of the Congresses on the French Language in Canada (Comité permanent des Congrès de la langue française en Amérique), which was inactive since 1920, was reactivated. It was composed of 20 members responsible to publish the account of the Congress's sittings and to see that the vows it has formulated become reality. In 1939, the Committee took the name of Comité de la survivance française en Amérique and it is under this name that it was incorporated in 1940.
