= Étienne-Théodore Pâquet =

Canadian politician (1850–1916)

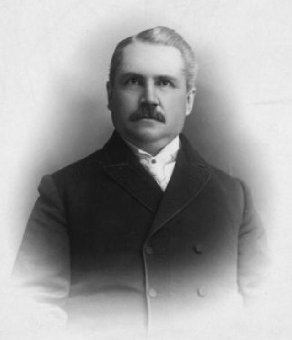

2nd Member of the Legislative Assembly of Quebec for Lévis
- In office 1875–1883
- Preceded by: Joseph-Goderic Blanchet
- Succeeded by: François-Xavier Lemieux
- Majority: 1875: 157 (4.1%); 1878: 183 (4,31%); 1879: 609 (16,41%); 1881: 59 (1,94%)

7th Provincial Secretary of Quebec
- In office 1879–1882
- Prime Minister: Joseph-Adolphe Chapleau
- Preceded by: Alexandre Chauveau
- Succeeded by: Jean Blanchet

Personal details
- Born: January 8, 1850 Saint-Nicolas, Canada East
- Died: May 26, 1916 (aged 66) Quebec City, Canada
- Party: Quebec Conservative
- Other political affiliations: Quebec Liberal (originally)
- Spouse: Emma LaRue
- Relations: Benjamin and Louis-Honoré Pâquet (uncles), Louis-Adolphe Pâquet (cousin), Auguste LaRue (father-in-law), Eugene Paquet (first cousin)
- Children: 1 son
- Profession: Civil law notary

Étienne-Théodore Pâquet (French pronunciation: [pɑkɛt]; January 8, 1850 – May 26, 1916) was a French-Canadian civil law notary,provincial politician and civil servant. In 1879, he was one of four Liberal Members of the Legislative Assembly who crossed the floor in the middle of a parliamentary crisis, causing the Joly-de-Lotbinière government to fall.

== Biography ==
Pâquet was born an only child in 1850 in Saint-Nicolas, near Lévis, in what was then Lotbinière County, on the southern shore of the Saint Lawrence River opposite Quebec City, in Canada East. The Pâquet family was an influential one, with churchmen Benjamin and Louis-Honoré, and theologian Louis-Adolphe Pâquet all important figures of the day. Étienne-Théodore's parents, Étienne-Théodore Sr. and Nathalie Moffat, were farmers and merchants. Étienne-Théodore Sr. was mayor of Saint-Nicolas between 1867 and 1873.

Pâquet studied at the Petit Séminaire de Québec, then at Fordham University (then St. John's College), before returning to Quebec to complete a Bachelor of Civil Law degree at Université Laval, graduating in 1872 and beginning work as a civil law notary while taking care of the farm. In the 1875 provincial election, he ran as a liberal against Joseph-Goderic Blanchet in the riding of Lévis. Blanchet, a family friend, nearly twice Pâquet's age, saw to point this out during the campaign, but ultimately lost to the younger man by a wide margin. Pâquet hence became one of only four (at the time) MLAs aged less than 26 years, at time of their election. (Note: The only younger ones at the time were Georges-Raoul Saveuse de Beaujeu (elected 1871 at 24), Raymond Préfontaine (elected at the same time and aged 24 and ten months), and Alexandre Chauveau (elected 1872 in a by-election and only a few months younger than Pâquet).)

Pâquet was re-elected in the 1878 election, which had formed a minority liberal government that was in precarious position for its entire sitting. On October 29, 1879, a series of political crises lead Liberal MLA Edmund James Flynn to propose an amendment demanding a coalition government. Pâquet and three other Liberals (Alexandre Chauveau, Louis Napoléon Fortin and Ernest Racicot) crossed the floor alongside Flynn to join the conservatives, causing the government to fall. Lieutenant-Governor of Quebec Théodore Robitaille, however, declined to dissolve the legislature, instead prompting opposition leader Joseph-Adolphe Chapleau to form a new government, in which Pâquet was Provincial Secretary until July 1882. He was re-elected to his seat in November of that year, only to resign it upon his nomination to the legislative council. He married the daughter of prominent businessman Auguste LaRue in the cathedral of Trois-Rivières in 1880. He was deeply involved in the establishment of the Crédit Foncier Franco-Canadien, a major credit union; in May of the next year both he and Jonathan Saxton Campbell Würtele were accused by David-Alexandre Ross of having been offered money in the deal. Although Würtele had refused the sum, Pâquet argued it was solely for work as director in the new company, an explanation that was satisfying to the public. The assembly eventually voted a motion by Ross to form a committee to investigate the issue. This committee's findings, if any, are not known. Due to infighting in the party, the investiture in Lévis for the 1881 elections was difficult to obtain, with disgruntled party members pitching him against Isidore-Noël Belleau, but Pâquet eventually gained the nomination and the election. As a government member, one of his goals had long been the construction of a bridge over the Chaudière River between Saint-Nicolas and Saint-Romuald, an issue he defended in the legislature until 1879, after his nomination to the government, when a yearly sum was finally voted upon, although the bridge was not built before Honoré Mercier came into power.

Pâquet left provincial politics in 1883 following a severe injury suffered while inspecting forest cuts with federal MP Joseph Bolduc, and was subsequently named sheriff of Quebec County, a post he kept until 1890. He dabbled in various commercial ventures: the aforementioned wood commerce, the Lévis and Kennebec Railway (auctioned off in 1881 to the Quebec Central Railway) and the Quebec Mining Co. among others. He ran as a conservative for Lévis and was defeated in the 1891 federal election. From 1894 to his death on 23 May 1916, he was the Quebec City postmaster. He is buried in the Saint-Nicolas parish cemetery.

The Pâquet family home, in Saint-Nicolas, is a provincially designated historic monument, and the entire estate area is a municipal-designated historic district, the Saint-Nicolas Heritage Site. In his later years, Pâquet wrote and published a historical account of the parish of Saint-Nicolas. His only son, Étienne-Théodore Jnr., married the daughter of Eugène-Étienne Taché.

== See also ==
- List of Canadian politicians who have crossed the floor
