= Third Congress on the French Language in Canada =

The Third Congress on the French Language in Canada (French: Troisième Congrès de la langue française au Canada) was held in Quebec City, Montreal and Saint-Hyacinthe, from June 18 to June 26, 1952. The theme of this third congress was "Let us preserve our cultural heritage" (Conservons notre héritage culturel).

== Organization ==
The third Congress on the French Language in Canada occurred only 15 years after the second one held in 1937. The year 1952 corresponded to the 50th anniversary of foundation of the Société du parler français au Canada (SPFC), as well as the centenary of Université Laval. Contrary to the congresses of 1912 and 1937, that of 1952 was organized by the Comité permanent de la survivance française en Amérique (CPSFA) and not directly by the SPFC. The theme of this third congress was "Let us preserve our cultural heritage" (Conservons notre héritage culturel).

The organizing committee, already at work in September 1951, was presided by abbot Adrien Verrette, president of the CPSFA. Members of the committee shared tasks in committees on finances, propaganda, reception, study, public demonstration and ladies. 26 regional committees were created.

The organizing committee wished to amass $75,000 CAD through a subscription, but instead amassed $88,312.67 CAD. This sum, added to a government grant was enough to ensure the production of the event.

As with the preceding congress, an honorary committee was instituted, to which the principal officers of the State and Church were appointed. Lieutenant-governor Gaspard Fauteux and the archbishop of Quebec Mgr Maurice Roy were designated as patrons of the congress. Afterwards came the prime minister of Canada Louis Saint-Laurent and the premier of Quebec Maurice Duplessis as presidents, the archbishop of Montreal Mgr Paul-Émile Léger, chief justice of Canada Thibaudeau Rinfret, Université Laval rector Ferdinand Vandry, chief justice of the supreme court of New Brunswick Enoil Michaud, and Henri T. Ledoux, as vice presidents.

The Académie française delegated its director Robert d'Harcourt. The governments of France and Haïti delegated their consuls.

== Progression ==
Contrary to the two preceding congresses, the Congress of 1952 did not entirely take place in Quebec City. Congress members left Quebec for Montreal on the morning of June 23, and stayed there until their departure for Saint-Hyacinthe on the morning of June 25. During their travelling, members were invited to visit Donnacona, Deschambault, Trois-Rivières, Louiseville, Berthierville and Saint-Jérôme.

The six study sections of the congress were as follow:

Section	Presidence
The survival of French	Comité permanent de la survivance française en Amérique
Spoken French	Société du parler français
French-speaking countries	Comité permanent de la survivance française en Amérique
Patriotic education	Association canadienne des éducateurs de langue française
Youth and patriotism	Association de la jeunesse canadienne
Refrancization	Paul Gouin

== Vows ==
The Congress of 1952 formulated six vows.

The first vow of the Congress was to rename the Comité permanent de la survivance française en Amérique (CPSFA) to Comité de la vie française en Amérique (CVFA).

The second vow renewed the 46 vows of the Congress of 1937, which were considered still valid in 1952.

The third vow pertained to the respect of the French language by the federal government and the ten provinces of Canada.

The fourth vow was concerned with the quality of French on radio, television and cinema.

The fifth vow had to do with the patriotic education of the youth.

With their sixth vow, the congress members wanted to set up a national yearly subscription to support the CVFA.
