= Benjamin Pâquet =

French-Canadian priest and educator (1832–1900)

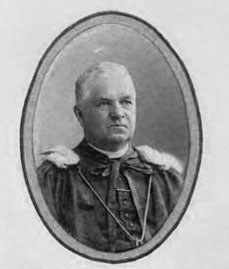
Paquet, date unknown

Benjamin Pâquet (or Paquet, pronounced [pɑkɛt]; March 27, 1832 – February 25, 1900) was a French-Canadian Roman Catholic priest and educator. He was an influential and controversial figure in 19th century Quebec religious politics, making numerous enemies amongst the French-Canadian ultra-montane elite of the period. Three times his name was cited for potential bishopry, but each time his opponents successfully lobbied against his nomination or the decision makers settled on a less controversial choice.

== Biography ==
Pâquet was born in 1832 in Saint-Nicolas, near Lévis, then Lotbinière County, on the southern shore of the Saint Lawrence River opposite Québec City. The son of farmers Étienne Pâquet and Ursule Lambert, he was descended from an old, pious family of the area, and was closely related to theologian Louis-Adolphe Pâquet as well as to provincial MLA Étienne-Théodore Pâquet (both nephews). His higher studies, as well as those of his younger brother Louis-Honoré, were financed by his uncle of the same name, a wealthy merchant. Benjamin entered the Petit Séminaire de Québec in 1845.

=== Theological studies and teaching ===
In 1849, when returning home from a pilgrimage at Sainte-Anne-de-Beaupré, he was prompted by his mother to become a priest. His studies completed, he immediately enrolled at the Grand Séminaire, where his major achievement was the relaunching the student newspaper, L'Abeille ("the Bee"), launched in the 1840s and whose publication had stopped. He was ordained in his home parish by then Bishop of Vancouver Island Modeste Demers, himself a Saint-Nicolas native. Assigned as assistant priest at Notre-Dame de Québec Cathedral (a fairly elevated office for a starting priest), he was specifically in charge of serving Notre-Dame-des-Victoires Church. In 1862, however, he requested a teaching position at the Petit Seminaire, a request he was granted.

The next year, he was one of three priests (the other two being his brother, and a future Archbishop Cardinal of Quebec Louis-Nazaire Bégin) selected to become Doctors of Theology in Europe as future teachers of the faculty of theology. There he enrolled at the Pontifical Gregorian University, where he and his brother arrived in the middle of the start-of-year rush. Jokingly referring to themselves as "savages", the pair integrated well. Pâquet soon demonstrated, in addition to theology, a keen interest in people and events, commenting on the inner politics and controversies of the time such as the Montreal ultramontanes' struggle, under the leadership of Ignace Bourget, to establish an independent university. He rapidly began acquiring knowledge about the Roman Curia and develop connections with various individuals. While in Rome, Louis-Honoré became very ill, and Benjamin promised that, should his brother recover, he'd build a chapel to the Virgin Mary, which he did upon in return. It is the modern Notre-Dame-de-Grâce chapel.

Upon his return in 1866 he was appointed to Université Laval's faculty, and soon thereafter got involved in one of numerous controversies that would pit him against Alexis Pelletier, a virulently polemic ultra-montane who would remain one of his staunchest opponents. This first clash was related to Frenchman Jean-Joseph Gaume's crusade to remove pagan authors from the classical curriculum, which Pelletier echoed in Canada. While in Rome, Pâquet had supported Elzéar-Alexandre Taschereau and Thomas-Étienne Hamel against him, and Pelletier retorted such vehement accusations that Bishop Charles-François Baillargeon sent a pastoral letter that threatened the anonymous accuser with canonical suspension.

At the university, Pâquet taught a number of classes, and became dean of the faculty of theology in 1871, a position he'd maintain until 1879. His last five lectures in his 1871-1872 *Laws of the Nations* course specifically discussed the explosive topic of Liberalism. In class, he refuted the most radical form based on the arguments from various papal teachings, revealing himself a moderate ultra-montane and carefully avoiding to touch the more troublesome local aspects (the rise of the Liberal Party of Canada, which its opponents saw as "an anti-Catholic party"), primarily because "the term did not have the same meaning [in Canada] as in Europe." These teachings were seen by all as displaying "bulletproof orthodoxy", which didn't keep Pelletier from denouncing them on his own in newspapers and a pamphlet. These attacks proved fruitless, and the text was hailed in La Civiltà Cattolica as "the most faithful echo of Roman doctrines." A revised and corrected edition was issued in 1877 in Rome.

=== Second trip to Rome ===
In 1873 Pâquet's candidacy for the then Diocese of Kingston was successfully opposed. That same year he resigned, citing health issues. Then-rector Hamel allowed him one year in Europe to recover. Pâquet was granted money so he could eventually provide some services to the University. It didn't take long before Pâquet was again deeply involved in defending the University's interests in Rome, and one year turned into five.

From Rome he became nothing short of a mastermind when it came to uncovering the events taking place back home. He collected inside information sent to him from Québec and Rome, and used it to direct and advise Hamel and Taschereau, even going so far as to compare himself to Napoleon. Amongst his informers were Hospice-Anthelme Verreau in Montreal, Calixte Marquis in Nicolet, Joseph-Sabin Raymond in Saint-Hyacinthe, and Zepherino Zitelli and [Alessandro Cardinal Franchi, from the then Sacred Congregation for the Propagation of the Faith. He invested a lot to increase his influence, and gained over that time several appointments: apostolic protonotary (1876), privy chamberlain (1877), and adviser to the Congregation of the Index (1878).

He succeeded in causing the fall of Bourget's plans for a university in Montreal, and eventually managed to have Laval canonical erected (although Édouard-Charles Fabre later secured virtual independence for what would eventually become the Université de Montréal). Rome would, from that point forward support Laval. Pâquet also fought Bourget's refusal to split the Parish of Notre-Dame, and Louis-François Laflèche's opposition to the new diocese of Nicolet. In addition to these endeavours, he was also postulator for the beatification of Marie de l'Incarnation.

=== Return to Quebec and later life ===
Laflèche was of the opinion that "the true Catholics could not get a hearing at Rome because of Pâquet's obstructiveness, and in Quebec, Archbishop Taschereau, deceived by the same man and by the university, was helping to defeat the Catholic forces and to swell the ranks of the Freemasons and anti-religious forces." For all this Pâquet attracted universal loathing from the ultra-montanes, and many of the province's bishops requested his return in 1878, seeing him as the prime source of strife amongst the clergy. He returned, but primarily for health reasons, and was proven to be deeply ill upon his return. The vicar of Cap-de-la-Madeleine, Luc Desilets, "saw his coming death as a sign of God's mercy to the country."

Pâquet took various positions at the seminary until 1887, when he was appointed superior, and thus rector of the university; that same year he was appointed a domestic prelate. During that period, his name was also suggested as bishop of the new diocese of Nicolet, but a more neutral nominee (Elphège Gravel) was eventually selected. Pâquet again returned to Rome in 1886 and 1888 to defend the university. In 1892, a year before leaving his rectory, a proposal to nominate him to the diocese of Chicoutimi was abandoned because of fierce opposition (Louis-Nazaire Bégin was succeeded by Michel-Thomas Labrecque). Laflèche called him "one of the main causes of the religious difficulties that have arisen over the past 30 years in the province of Quebec".

At this point he experienced a period of doubt. He refused the parish of Notre-Dame-de-L'Annonciation, in L'Ancienne-Lorette, even though he had requested it be kept for him, and even considered entering the orders. His health tormenting him, he retired to a country retirement house for priests, the Ermitage, he had built in 1890 on the familial estate in Saint-Nicolas, right next to the 1866 Chapel. Pâquet had inherited a good sum from his uncle, and was a skilled investor himself, so that he lived without need. After his death in early 1900, he was buried in the seminary's chapel, the reconstruction of which he had financed after a fire in 1888.

== Legacy ==
Pâquet helped secure the status of Université Laval in the eyes of Rome. He remained all his life a controversial public figure, so that both his strong points and his shortcomings were widely known. Although an influential, pious man with a deep respect for his offices, he was also domineering and tended to have strong disagreements with just about everybody he worked alongside: "he gave advice, but above all he liked to have his advice followed." Primarily an ideologue, he had fairly little interest in scholarly debate.

Most of Pâquet's papers accumulated during his functions at the seminary and university are kept at the former as the Fonds Benjamin Paquet. The Chapelle Notre-Dame-de-Grâce and Pâquet family home are provincial historic places listed on the Répertoire du patrimoine culturel du Québec, and part of Saint-Nicolas Heritage Site, the equivalent of a local historic district.

== Bibliography ==
- Souvenir consacré à la mémoire vénérée de Mgr P.F. Turgeon, archevêque de Québec et premier visiteur de l'Université Laval, Quebec City, L. Brousseau, 1867, 47 p.
- Discours prononcé à la cathédrale de Québec, le 10 avril 1869, cinquantième anniversaire de la prêtrise de Pie IX, Quebec City, Delisle, 1869, 25 p.
- Monseigneur Baillargeon, sa vie, son oraison funèbre, prononcée à la cathédrale, son éloge dans les églises du Québec et ses funérailles, Quebec City, A. Côté et cie, 1870, 93 p.
- Le Libéralisme; leçons données à l'université Laval, Quebec City, Le Canadien, 1872, 103 p.
  - Rome, Imprimerie Polyglotte de la S.C. de la propagande, 1877, 190 p. (revised edition).
- Police! Police! à l'école, les enfants!, Montréal, [s.e., 187?].
- Lettre à Son Em. le card. Taschereau, et aux archevêques et évêques qui composent le Conseil supérieur de l'Université Laval, Quebec City, 28 février 1891, [Quebec City, s.e., 1891], 14 p.
- Quelques Lettres de Mgr B. Paquet, recteur de l'Université Laval, suivies de quelques remarques par l'abbé J.-B. Proulx, vice-recteur de l'Université Laval à Montréal, Montréal, C.O. Beauchemin, 1891, 45 p.

Preceded by Michel-Édouard Méthot	Rector of Université Laval; 1887–1893	Succeeded by Joseph-Clovis-Kemner Laflamme
