= Louis-Honoré Pâquet =

French-Canadian Roman Catholic priest and university teacher

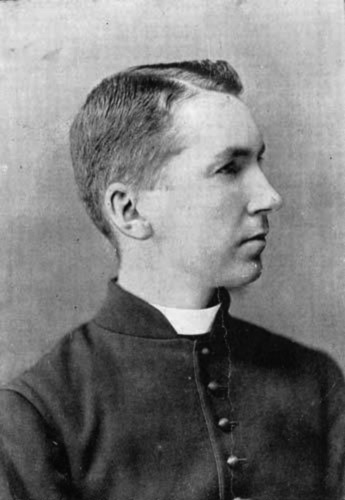
Pâquet, date unknown

Louis-Honoré Pâquet (or Paquet, French pronunciation: [pɑkɛt]; 23 October 1838 – 19 September 1915) was a French-Canadian Roman Catholic priest and university teacher, as well as celebrated orator of his time.

== Biography ==
Pâquet was born in 1838 in Saint-Nicolas, near Lévis, in what was then Lotbinière County, on the southern shore of the Saint Lawrence River opposite Québec City. The son of farmers Étienne Pâquet and Ursule Lambert, he was descended from an old, pious family of the area, and was closely related to theologian Louis-Adolphe Pâquet as well as to provincial MLA Étienne-Théodore Pâquet (both nephews). His studies, like those of his older brother Benjamin, were financed by their uncle (also named Benjamin), a wealthy merchant.

At the Petit Séminaire de Québec, he was an excellent student, and a frequent contributor to the resurrected student newspaper, writing on the Montalembert and Mortara affairs. His studies completed, he immediately enrolled at the seminary proper. He was ordained on September 21, 1862. The following years he was amongst three priests (the other two were Benjamin and future archbishop Louis-Nazaire Bégin) chosen to completed advanced studies in Rome. He made easy friends and was generally tagged as a "charmer".

His studies were quick and he came back to Canada a Doctor of Theology just in time to succeed Thomas-Étienne Chandonnet (himself leaving to study in Rome) as professor of philosophy at Université Laval. In 1869 he had to spend six month in the Southern United States due to health problems. He was in general of frail health: he had gotten very ill in Rome, and his brother had promised to build a chapel (now Notre-Dame de Grâce Chapel, in Saint-Nicolas) should he recover. Returning from that travel he became a lecturer of dogma, a position where his oratory and teaching abilities began to be noticed. His voice was described as "sonorous and metallic, truly remarkable." His language was hailed as sound and composed, clearly expressing whatever idea he wanted to carry. He was equally at home in sermon, homilies, lecture and extemporaneous speaking. Although he spoke widely, he wrote little and most of his preserved speeches were written down by others. He was known enough that he was one of three speakers (the other two were Sherbrooke bishop Antoine Racine and Fr. Gustave Bourassa, brother of PM Henri Bourassa) literary critic and historian Camille Roy chose to exemplify 19th century religious oratory style.

He taught at Laval for over twenty years, preaching and speaking on the sides on numerous occasions, such as eulogy for Charles-François Baillargeon and a speech on the occasion of the 600th anniversary of the death of Saint Thomas Aquinas. In 1874 he was named chaplain of the Franciscan Sisters in Quebec City, before becoming chaplain of the Franciscan Missionaries of Mary in 1895. The newly arrived order greatly benefited from the man's business sense and unshakeable confidence. He used that appointment to further his personal goal of establishing a location for the adoration of the holy eucharist, to which the order's chapel was dedicated (the entire convent has since been converted in a retirement home complex). For that he founded a magazine and a fraternity.

In addition to these works, he was a major actor in bringing the Franciscan Brothers in Quebec City. In 1904, he traveled back to Europe with his nephew Louis-Adolphe. It would be his second and last travel: his health definitely degenerated in 1914 and he died in September 1915. In his private life Pâquet was an avid hunter and fisher, as well as a skilled musician. As a man, he was skinny with early white hair, in stark contrast with his brother, an overweight man. In 1916, a volume compiling a number of his speeches and some biographical notes was published.

The Pâquet family home, in Saint-Nicolas, is a provincially designated historic monument, and the entire estate is a municipal-designated historic district, Saint-Nicolas Heritage Site.

== Bibliography ==
- L'abbé Louis-Honoré Pâquet : échos et glanures (1916) Quebec: Imprimerie franciscaine missionnaire, 369p.
