= Louis-Adolphe Paquet =

French-Canadian theologian (1859–1942)

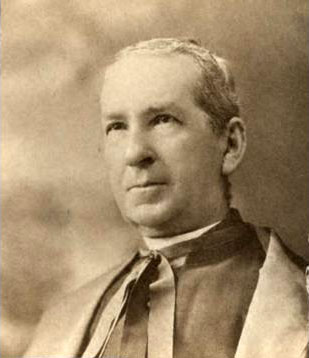
Paquet, ca. 1920

Louis-Adolphe Paquet (French pronunciation: [pɑkɛt]; also Pâquet; (Note: His family name is often given with a circumflex, which is also the normal form for several of his relatives.) August 4, 1859 – February 4, 1942) was an influential French-Canadian theologian from the late 19th early 20th century, and a major North American proponent and actor in the rebirth of Neo-Scholasticism. Although nowhere as politically influential as his uncle Benjamin Pâquet had been, he was well respected and his opinion helped shape the doctrines and policies of the Canadian church in the early 20th century.

== Biography ==
Joseph-Louis-Adolphe Paquet (Note: His full baptismal name was Joseph Louis Adolphe, following the tradition of using "Joseph" as the first given name, which would continue until the mid-20th century. As is usual in such cases, Paquet did not use his first name. Hyphens are usually added even if they were not present on baptism documents.) was born on August 4, 1859, to a farmer couple, Adolphe Pâquet and Éléonore Demers, on the family domain in Saint-Nicolas, on the southern shore of the Saint Lawrence River opposite Quebec City. He was their eldest son, though not their eldest child, which was his sister Joséphine. Adolphe Pâquet would later be mayor of the municipality in the 1870s and 1880s. Louis-Adolphe came from an influential family: two of his uncles, Benjamin and Louis-Honoré Pâquet, were notable churchmen, and one of his cousins, Étienne-Théodore, would later be elected to the provincial legislature.

Paquet studied in nearby Saint-Louis-de-Lotbinière, then at the Séminaire de Québec before continuing his theological studies at the Pontifical Urbaniana University (then the University of the Propaganda), where he presented his D.D. thesis before Pope Leo XIII in June 1883. He had been ordained earlier that year, on March 24. Upon his return, he became a teacher of theology at Université Laval, an appointment he would keep until his death in 1942, one of the longest careers in the department. He would also along the course of his career, be dean of the Faculty of Theology (1904–1938) and Director of the Quebec Seminary (1902). He was made apostolic protonotary in 1902 and member of the Royal Society of Canada in 1903.

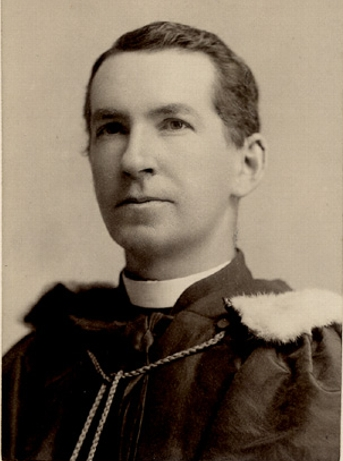
Louis-Adolphe Paquet c.1900

Encouraged by the pope to promote Neo-Scholasticism in Canada, he became one of the foremost proponents of the new philosophy, writing extensively on it and founding in 1930 the Académie canadienne Saint-Thomas d'Aquin, a philosophical organization devoted to the study of Saint Thomas Aquinas' writings. A prolific writer, he published in a number of venues from episcopal publications to newspapers, when he was not outright part of the direction board. As official interpreter of Papal pronouncements on questions interesting French Canada, he became very influential, pronouncing opinions on issues such as the Manitoba Schools Question (his first public intervention) and Ontario's Regulation 17. His 1902 speech, La Vocation de la race française en Amérique ("The Vocation of the French Race in America"), shaped French-Canadian nationalism around a missionary office for decades. Although the idea was already present in the writings of others, it was this speech that memorably crystallized it as a formal ideology and would be later cited as the text to refer to on the issue. In the same decade, he was an envoy of Louis-Nazaire Bégin to Rome, in 1906, where he would be an important element in the latter's rise to cardinalate. In 1909, he was charged with rewriting the schemata (decree proposals) resulting from the first Plenary Council of the Canadian Church.

Paquet's Le Droit public de l'Église codified a lot of the French-Canadian catholic doctrine of the time, to the point that one commenter, Dominican Ceslas-Marie Forest, the dean of Université de Montréal's faculty of philosophy, described it as "Sacro-saint", "untouchable", "integrist" and "reactionary"; amongst other things, it was the source of the major arguments against mandatory public education (which Paquet characterized as a Freemason plot). In 1907, he was amongst the founders of L'Action Catholique, an antisemitic traditionalist Catholic newspaper that would reach its highest points under Maurice Duplessis. In its page, he would notably condemn Bolshevism, characterizing it as little more than anarchism. Although he voiced strong opinions (but in fact mostly echoed the prevalent conservative views of the French-Canadian clergy and elites of his time), Paquet had—unlike his uncle Benjamin—fairly little direct involvement in the religious politics of the period, a state that might have changed had the plan to counteract the Irish Catholic influence in Rome succeeded. The idea was to install him permanently in Rome with the Jesuits and have him named consultant to a few congregations, where he could acquire episcopal prestige. It is not known why that plan was never acted upon.

Paquet's philosophy was characterised by some of the strictest ultramontane principles of the times (hence Forest's description of his Droit). He was one of the most vocal and noticeable opponents of women's voting rights in the 20s and 30s, and is even credited by some as a major agent of the strong social conservatism that would remain prevalent until the 50s; his influence nonetheless declined as public interest moved away from the religious to the social aspect of socio-religious issue, and his writing is considered of little interest in modern theological or social discussions beyond historic or historiographic considerations. A large collection of his papers, primarily from his career at Laval, are part of the Quebec Seminary archives. The Pâquet family domain is the major element of a local historic district, the Saint-Nicolas Heritage Site, as well as a historic monument.
