= Saint-Nicolas Heritage Site =

Municipal historic district in Lévis, Quebec, Canada

Coordinates: 46°42′0.24″N 71°25′7.89″W

The Saint-Nicolas Heritage Site (French: site du patrimoine de Saint-Nicolas) is a small municipal historic district located in the western part of Lévis, Quebec. It encompasses a group of a half-dozen properties and their dependencies that developed around the estate of a major family. Most of the buildings date from the 19th century, with the oldest dating from the mid-18th century. Two of them were later separately designated historic monuments (French: monuments historiques) at the provincial level. The site was the second designated in the province.

== Buildings and characteristics ==
The site comprises some 7 properties, mostly on the northern side of Marie-Victorin Road (French: Route Marie-Victorin; Quebec Route 132), with one on the merging Pioneers Street (French: rue des Pionniers), and is located west of the original village core of Saint-Nicolas (Saint-Nicolas was merged to Lévis in 2002). Only the Notre-Dame-de-Grâce Hermitage and Chapel are located on the southern side of the road. An eighth building, a 1948 bungalow mimicking traditional architecture is located within the site but is of little historical or architectural significance.

=== Historic monuments ===
The Pâquet House (French: Maison Pâquet) is located at 1630 Marie-Victorin Road, and was built around 1760. It is a good example of French vernacular architecture. A long-façaded (over 90 ft) building, it was enlarged twice, once on each side of the original building, during its history (though the dates are not known precisely, the last addition was made before 1850). The dimensions of the original building are still very visible as they are marked by the position of the two chimneys. This size is in part attributable to the various uses the house has had: at some point a general store was located inside. The house is built using pièce-sur-pièce techniques where notched logs are piled horizontally, and covered with vertical wood sidings, with low foundations (compared with buildings of the 19th century and later) and a tall roof. The ceiling lines are low, and a half-story is built under the roof, lit by straight gable-fronted dormer windows on two levels, with the higher dormers much smaller. The roof is straight, with little to no overhang, and covered in cedar shingles. All windows are divided in smaller square panes; those of the ground floor have external shutters. The original door was placed asymmetrically in regard to the building, and a carriage door is on the right side.

During the 19th century, the Pâquet House received many alterations to bring it more in line with the English-introduced styles that strongly influenced Quebec vernacular architecture; almost all these modifications were reverted when the building was thoroughly renovated in late 1880s. The second row of dormer was re-added, the roof was straightened back, the roof overhang and a porch over the main entrance were removed. The Pâquet house has several dependencies, the major ones being an 1825 shed and a late 1820s barn.

Opposite the house across the road is Notre-Dame-de-Grâce Chapel (French: Chapelle Notre-Dame-de-Grâce) and its accompanying Hermitage. The chapel, built in 1867–68, lacks a separate civic number (it is part of the Pâquet House lot), whereas the adjoining Hermitage, now a private residence, is #1631. The chapel is a small Gothic Revival building. Its structure is wooden and covered with bricks. The steep roof is covered with shingles creating polychrome motives. All openings are ogive-shaped, and most wooden surfaces, such as those of the large square front porch, are elaborately carved. All four angles are marked with buttresses topped with tall (taller than the roof, in fact) wooden pinnacles. A small sacristy juts on the right side of the otherwise rectangular building. The inside decoration is equally elaborate, with fake wooden rib vault, glass- and plasterwork (the latter is frequent in Quebec 19th century religious architecture). Each corner has an alcove with a statue of a different saint (Sts. Nicholas, Joachim, Anne and Joseph); these statues were imported from Germany in 1871. The Chapel and Hermitage are surrounded by a dense cover of trees.

=== Other buildings ===
The other buildings within the site, although typical examples of 18th- and 19th-century vernacular cottages in their own right, are of limited historical interest beyond their overall link to the Pâquet estate. All except the Hermitage house share a common shape: a curved roof with three gable dormers and a short overhang that does not cover the porch (while it is common for the overhand to extend and cover a verandah, it is not the case in any of the site's buildings), a discreet summer kitchen placed perpendicular to the main building (whereas a parallel plan is more common in Saint-Nicolas), and two or four front windows, usually symmetrically placed on each side of the front door.

The Notre-Dame-de-Grâce Hermitage (French: Ermitage Notre-Dame-de-Grâce, 1631, Marie-Victorin Road) is an 1887 Second Empire house with a mansard roof, a verandah and a summer kitchen. The main building has three front dormers; the summer kitchen is a smaller-scale version of the corps de logis. The Hermitage originally was surrounded by an elaborate garden, little of which remains today. One of the dependencies, a small square building dubbed the "Noviciate" (French: Noviciat), was converted to a chalet and moved to an adjacent plot.

The Bergeron House (French: Maison Bergeron; 1572 Marie-Victorin Road) was built in 1788. It is a French-Canadian home with picturesque influences reminding of carpenter gothic style. A two floor building, its verandah runs on both the façade and the side, to the entrance of the summer kitchen. The overhang and angle brace are elaborately jig-sawn. It is a tall, imposing building with four façade windows and three dormers on a curved roof.

Although less imposing, the 1890 Éléonore Pâquet House (French: Maison Éléonore-Pâquet; 1540 Pioneers Street), the easternmost building on the site, shows similar decorative influence to the Bergeron House. Its front porch cover is also independent from the curved, sheet-metal roof, and has decorative angle braces (though they are less elaborate). A smaller porch links the master building to the summer kitchen. While the façade is brick-covered, the sidings is scale-mounted sheet metal. The window frames, unlike those of the Bergeroun house, are slightly curved, rather than gabled (this gabled decorative motif above openings is common in Saint-Nicolas). The door is surrounded by windows with round corners on all three sides, with the top corners taken by small round ones.

Built around 1870, the Ignace Pâquet House (French: Maison Ignace-Pâquet; 1646 Marie-Victorin Road) shares elements of the Éléonore Pâquet and Bergeron houses, with peculiarities of its own that have led to its being qualified as "one of the most gracious houses" in the area. All three buildings share the same motif on their decorative braces. The Ignace Pâquet House borrows its general plan, with a verandah running on two sides, and its dormers' curved gable to the Bergeron house, but its brick façade, smaller proportions and roof covering are the same as the Éléonore Pâquet House, except that its doors and windows are surrounded with contrasting white brickwork. This feature, popular in Victorian architecture, is uncommon in the Lévis area. The porch juts forward in front of the door with an additional pediment. The veranda is also the only one to have a balustrade.

The Bernier-Montminy House (French: Maison Bernier-Montminy; 1602 Marie-Victorin Road) dates from the mid-1840s. It is the only pre-1900 house on the site besides the Pâquet House to lack a verandah, contending with a small, uncovered porch. Its main peculiarities are the slight asymmetry in the placement of the façade openings (the door is distinctly closer to the windows on the right side), and the decoration of their frames, which are painted the same dark green as the shutters of the Pâquet house.

== History ==
Étienne Pâquet was a descendant from one Philippe Pasquier, who came from France to Île d'Orléans. He left the island and came first to Saint-Sylvestre, Quebec, though he married in Saint-Nicolas in 1762, before coming to the latter village. He originally bought a lot on the second concession of Saint-Nicolas, which he swapped with owners from the Bergeron family (connected to the Bergeron House), thus acquiring the original house. The Pâquet family grew to include several important personalities, from mayors of Saint-Nicolas and prominent local businessmen to churchmen (Benjamin Pâquet, Louis-Honoré Pâquet and Louis-Adolphe Paquet), as well as provincial (Étienne-Théodore Pâquet) and federal (Eugène Paquet) politicians. The exact series of owner is not entirely clear, but by the late 19th century, it was the property of Étienne-Théodore Pâquet (father of the MLA). Neither his son nor his grandson used it much, and in the 1920s it was sold to the Hébert family.

With the exception of the Bergeron House, most other buildings were built by various family members (including the Bernier-Montminy House, originally built by Benjamin Pâquet Sr.). Although most were originally agricultural estates, they are now left as regular residences, with most dependencies having been torn down.

The site was first identified in 1984 by a review from the then Les Chutes-de-la-Chaudière Regional County Municipality. The municipality designated the site in 1987, shortly after the Loi sur les biens culturel, which regulates historic preservation at the provincial level, was amended to provide specifically for municipal designation. The site was among the first to be designated by a municipality in the province, with only the North Hatley Heritage Site preceding it by a month. A few years later the Pâquet House and Notre-Dame-de-Grâce Chapel were classified as historic monuments, and subsequently restored to their better times. Primarily this involved removing various Regency-inspired alterations to the Pâquet House as well as moving the chapel and rebuilding its elaborate porch, which was dismantled in the 1850s during widening work on Quebec Route 132.
