= Cécile Rouleau =

Canadian trade unionist

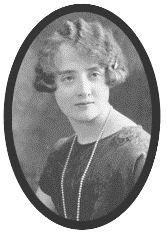
- Born: April 5, 1905; Quebec City, Quebec
- Died: January 3, 1999 (aged 93); Quebec City, Quebec
- Occupation: trade unionist

Cécile Rouleau (April 5, 1905 – January 3, 1999) was a sociologist and trade unionist in Quebec, Canada. She was the first woman to hold a management position in the government of Quebec.

== Biography ==
She was born in Quebec City and received a diploma in social sciences from Laval University in 1943.

Rouleau was co-founder of the Syndicat des instituteurs et institutrices du Québec, the Fédération des instituteurs et institutrices du Québec and the Association canadienne d'éducation de langue française, serving as secretary-general for the last organization for 25 years. She founded the journal La Montée and served as its director.

In 1950, Rouleau was named a Chevalier in the Société du parler français au Canada and, in 1967, an officer in the Ordre du Conseil de la vie française en Amérique. In 1979, she was named an officer in the Compagnie des Cent-Associés francophones. She was named an officer in the National Order of Quebec in 1987.

Rouleau published more than 470 articles and other publications.

She died in Quebec City in 1999.

The Bibliothèque Cécile-Rouleau was named in her honour.
