= First Congress on the French Language in Canada =

Canadian French language conference

The First Congress on the French Language in Canada (French: Premier Congrès de la langue française au Canada) was held in Quebec City from June 24 to June 30, 1912. Its stated objective was to "examine the questions raised by the defence, the culture and the development of the French language and literature in Canada."

== Organization ==
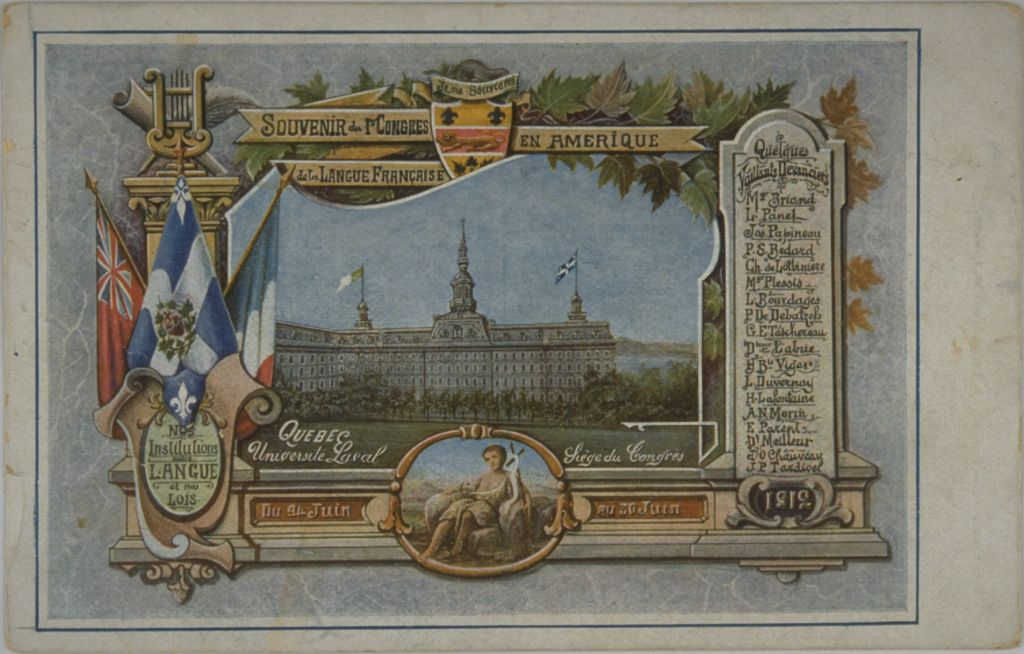
Post card in memory of the 1st Congress on the French Language in America

On February 14, 1911, the executive office of the Société du parler français au Canada (SPFC) resolved to organize and convoke a Congress on the French Language in Canada to be held in the course of 1912, in Quebec City, under the patronage of Université Laval. The SPFC set up an organizing committee composed of ten of its members, under the presidency of Mgr Paul-Eugène Roy, in order to set the date of the congress and see to the preparation of the event.

Some two months later, on April 10, while the organizing was in progress, the committee sent a message "to all the French Canadians and to all the Acadians who have at heart the conservation of their language and their nationality" to invite them to take part to this first congress from Monday June 24 to Sunday June 30. While the Congress's name mentions the French language "in Canada", the organizers explicitly addressed their invitation to all the French speakers of America. Regional committees were formed by the general organizing committee to recruit members as much in Quebec as in Ontario, Western Canada, in the Atlantic provinces or the United States.

The organizing committee, wanting to make the congress a milestone event, sought the participation of civil society and the representatives of political and religious powers. The Quebec government, headed by Liberal premier Lomer Gouin was very favourable to holding the Congress in the historical capital of Quebec. In addition to the rooms of the Université Laval, the congress members were granted access to the rooms of the provincial Parliament Building.

The opening of the Congress on June 24 was intended to associate the event with a great day of patriotism and confer to it a solemn, popular and festive character. On June 23 and 24, just before the official opening of the Congress, its members were invited to participate to the "National Day of the French Canadians" which was organized by the Saint-Sauveur de Québec chapter of the Association Saint-Jean-Baptiste (ASJB) and other affiliated branches. As part of the programme were the traditional mass, procession, banquet, speeches, entertainment, etc.

At 8:00 p.m. on June 24, the opening session of the Congress held in the Salle des exercices militaires on Grande Allée street was the occasion of great pomp with music and speeches from the principal officers of the Congress, the Lieutenant Governor François Langelier, members of the Catholic clergy, the former prime minister of Canada Wilfrid Laurier, the premier of Quebec Lomer Gouin, Charles-Eudes Bonin, of the general consulate of France in Quebec City, Étienne Lamy, delegate of the Académie française, the mayor of Quebec Napoléon Drouin, ministers from the provinces of Ontario and the Maritimes, etc.

The room was decorated with the flags of Great Britain, Canada, Quebec, France, the United States, and also the Carillon Sacré-Cœur. The musicians played God Save the Queen, the national anthem of both Great Britain and the Dominion of Canada, Ô Canada, then the national anthem of French Canadians, as well as other patriotic or traditional airs such as Vive la Canadienne, À la claire fontaine, Ô Canada! mon pays, mes amours, etc.

== Progression ==
The Congress was made of four study sections: scientific, pedagogical, literary and propaganda. It held eight general sessions in addition to the various sessions of each section which occurred independently under the direction of their own executive office. In the sessions held by the study sections, participants presented memoirs, gave speeches, deliberated and formulated "vows" and propositions related to their study field. In the general sessions, participants gave patriotic speeches on the French language and rapporteurs gave an account of the work done by the sections before all congress members. The assembly of all congress members ratified the reports and voted for or against the vows and propositions coming from the sections.

The four study sections of the Congress of 1912
Scientific Section
President : Pascal Poirier
Sub-section on history	Sub-section on law	Sub-section on philology
President : Joseph-Edmond Roy; Secretary : Thomas Nadeau; Rapporteur : Antonio Huot	President : M. A. Constantineau; Secretary : Oscar Hamel; Rapporteur : Joseph-Évariste Prince	President : Alcée Fortier; Secretary : J.-E. Plamondon; Rapporteur : Émile Chartier
Pedagogical Section
President: Pierre Boucher de la Bruère; Secretary: Charles-Joseph Magnan; Rapporteurs: Philippe Perrier (primary school) and Narcisse Degagné (high school)
Literary Section
President: Ferdinand Roy; Secretary: Jean-Baptiste Lagacé; Rapporteur: Camille Roy
Propaganda Section
President: Thomas Chapais
Sub-section A: Associations	Sub-section B: Family, social relations, the press, etc.	Sub-section C: Commerce and industry, the arts and sciences
President: Thomas Chapais; Secretary: Pierre-Georges Roy; Rapporteur: Élie Auclair	President: Eugène Rouillard; Secretary: Amédée Denault; Rapporteur: Théophile Hudon	President: Armand Bédard; Secretary: Cyrille Gagnon; Rapporteur: Hector Bernier

Individuals who became member of the congress received a 96-page Guide du congressiste, and a medal badge crafted by Alexandre Morlon on which were carved the words of French poet Gustave Zidler: C'est notre doux parler qui nous conserve frères. ("It is our gentle speech that keeps us brothers.")

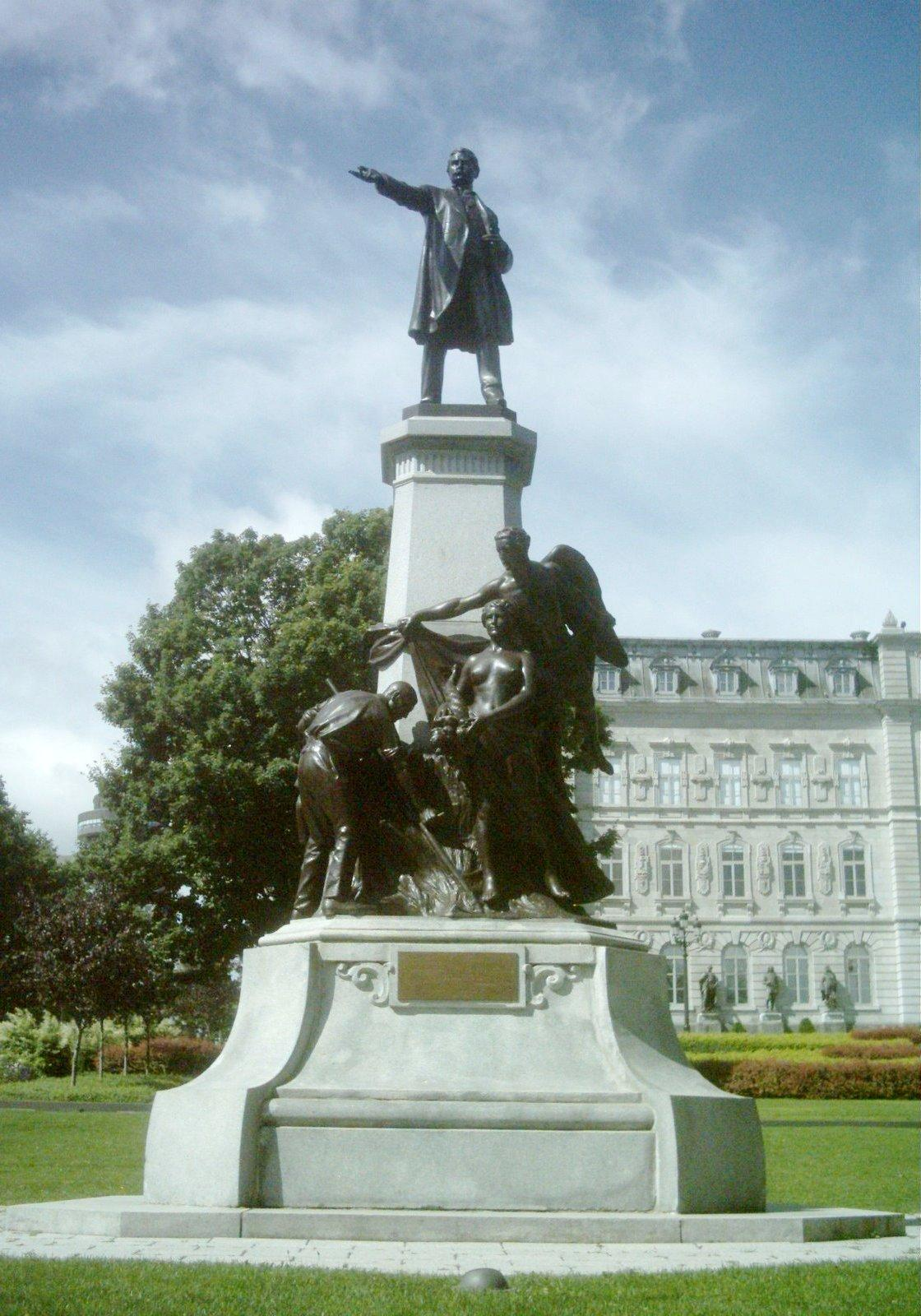
Monument to Honoré Mercier, north of the Grande Allée, in front of the Parliament of Quebec. Inaugurated on June 25, 1912.

In addition to the serious work of the different study sections, the programme of the Congress included activities of a more symbolic character such as the inauguration, Tuesday June 25 at 3:00 p.m., of the monument to Honoré Mercier on the Quebec parliamentary hill, the awarding of honorific diplomas from the Université Laval, as well as other activities that today would be judged "touristic", such as the Wednesday June 26 morning expedition to the Petit-Cap, the summer residence of the Messieurs of the Séminaire de Québec, located in Saint-Joachim de Montmorency. Abbott Charles Thellier de Poncheville and poet Gustave Zidler, who arrived on the morning of June 26, took part to this excursion where congress members feasted, sang songs, read poems, and gave more speeches.

Friday June 28 was reserved to the delegates of New England, Armand Bédard, president of the Boston Franco-American Historical Society and Mr. Henri-T. Ledoux, president of the Union Saint-Jean-Baptiste d'Amérique, who came to Quebec to give the right hour on the situation of the francophone communities in the United States.

On the morning of Saturday June 29, the plenary assembly of the congress unanimously adopted the proposition of MM. Jean-Baptiste Lagacé and Adjutor Rivard to set up a Permanent Committee of the Congresses on the French language in America whose purpose was "to defend, to cultivate, extend, and develop the French language and literature in Canada and in general among the Acadians and French Canadians of North America". In addition to this general mandate, the permanent committee was given the specific mandate to "ensure the publication of the acts, the realization of the vows, and the continuation of the work of the Congress on the French language in Canada". At 9:00 p.m., at diner was held in the celebration room of the Château Frontenac, which in 1912 was only 20 years old.

On Sunday June 30, at 9:00 a.m., a mass was given at the Notre-Dame de Québec Cathedral and in the afternoon, a procession organized by the Association catholique de la jeunesse canadienne-française (ACJC) circulated in Quebec City. A closing general session was held at the Salle des exercices militaires, and afterwards all members were invited to attend a fireworks show before the Parliament.

== Memoirs ==
The four sections of the Congress received a total of 65 memoirs.

Of the 19 memoirs pertaining to scientific subjects, seven were concerned with the history of the French language in Canada, seven other pertained to the legal situation of French throughout the Canadian federation and in the United States, and the remaining five discussed the philological questions.

The 21 memoirs of the education section gave Congress members a statistical overview of the teaching of French in Canada and the United States.

The 10 memoirs presented to the literary section discussed the state and future of Canadian literature, its development and propagation, its place in schools, etc.

The 15 memoirs of the section on propaganda were concerned with the quality of French in the press, in the associations, at home, in industry, trade, sciences and public service.

== Vows ==
The first congress led to the adoption of a long series of declarations and vows by the congress members who took part to the different study sections.

Scientific section

The sub-section on history formulated four vows:

- that the names of the "most valiant apostles and defenders of our idiom in this country" be taught in schools and colleges and that monuments be erected in their honour;
- that a historical section of the SPFC be founded to make history be better known;
- that French Canadians of Quebec and the emigrants to the United States be encouraged to grow the ranks of the French communities settled in Western Canada, Ontario and the Maritimes
- that a Colonization Bureau be founded in Quebec City with correspondence bureaus in the West.

The sub-section on law:

- that a special committee "responsible to watch over the legislation pertaining to language rights" be formed;
- that everywhere in Canada where important French-speaking groups exist that the French language be maintained or established at the same level as English;
- that the committee makes the people know their rights; that the defence of the rights of the French language be required from election candidates.

The sub-section on philology:

- that the public be informed on the differences between language, patois and dialect "so as to proscribe the absurd distinction that is made between Parisian French and Canadian French";
- that one answers "with scientific demonstrations to those who scorn the archaic character of the lexicology, phonetic and syntax of popular French in America";
- that the educated class take care of their speech and fight against errors and anglicisms;
- that schools teach students a "Catéchisme du parler français" (a table of the principal errors of phonetic, syntax, plus anglicisms and their French equivalent);
- that French orthography continue to conform to "the changes adopted by the Académie française in its report of March 9, 1905";
- that a permanent commission be set up "for the designation of newly explored areas in the province of Quebec";
- that a series of geographical maps be conceived to make the province known;

Pedagogical section

Concerning primary education, the pedagogical section formulated the vows:

- that the salaries of the school masters and school mistresses be increased;
- that catholic and bilingual normal schools be opened in all provinces of Canada if possible;
- that French speaking Canadians of Alberta and Saskatchewan demand primary education in French and no longer be satisfied with only half an hour of French;
- that the French language press of America protest against "the reduction of French in the primary schools of Ontario, and against the double inspection by English and French-Canadian inspectors";
- that a pedagogical faculty be founded in the University of Ottawa; that a greater number of parish schools be built in New England;
- that bilingual schools in which French remains the general schooling language be built;
- that a picture or a statue of the Sacred Heart of Jesus be in honour in bilingual schools;
- that the Bulletin du Parler français au Canada and fascicle on anglicisms be addressed to the schools of Quebec;
- that the teaching of French in primary schools be improved by increasing the number of written exercises, awards to students for their efforts, and creating "bon parler" circles;
- that libraries be created in primary schools.

Concerning secondary education, its vows were:

- that colleges maintain the teaching of Latin and Greek as being useful to the defence and mastery of French;
- that historical grammar also be maintained;
- that the University of Ottawa and the collège Saint-Boniface receive more support and preserve the teaching of French;
- that the Cercles du Parler français develop;
- that libraries be furnished with "works suited to the development of the mind, the elevation of the soul";
- that a place be granted to Canadian works, "notably those pertaining to history";
- that a Prix du Parler français be founded in all schools and colleges where it has not already been done.

Literary section

The literary section's vows were:

- that classical and modern literature be propagated as widely as possible;
- that French-Canadian literature be better known;
- that awards be granted for French-Canadian works "of a truly national character";
- that the dictionary of the SPFC be published as soon as possible to let the French of Canada be better known;
- that the study of history and Canadian literature be introduced as part of secondary education;
- that an École normale supérieure be established as soon as possible; that an inter-collegial bulletin be founded;
- that literary culture be developed as of primary school;
- that literature considered pornographic be fought against;

Propaganda section

The three sub-sections of the propaganda section formulated numerous vows.

Sub-section A (associations) wanted:

- that associations which are national in character be preferred over other types;
- that the French-Canadian and Acadian associations of Canada and the United States unite in their efforts all the while remaining distinct and autonomous;
- that branches of the ASJB and the ACJC be created in all French-Canadian milieus to foster the use and culture of the national language by literature nights and to celebrate June 24 everywhere;
- that predication and catechism be given in French in all parishes where it is possible;
- that mothers be incited to watch the quality of the French spoken by their children;
- that they nourish in their children the love of their language through national songs and tales;
- that mothers give the good example not only to their children but also to the fathers;
- that a feminine association corresponding to the ACJC be created;
- that marriage among French speakers be encouraged;

Sub-section B (family, social relations, the press, etc.):

- that the predication of catechism be given in French;
- that mothers correct their children, make them love the French language through "national and religious songs and tales";
- that mothers make use of their influence on the fathers so that these also give the example of good language, pure from vulgar expressions;
- that mothers raising children in the English provinces surround them with friends and maids who speak French;
- that daughters give the good example to their brothers;
- that parents have their children educated in French everywhere possible;
- that parents who are in a mixed marriage see that their children also learn French at home;
- that parents read books such as, for example, Colette Baudoche by Maurice Barrès and Les Oberlé by René Bazin;
- that those who give life to French-language newspapers become conscious of the influence they have on language;
- that citizens give financial support to their newspapers;
- that the SPFC sets up a network of committees in urban centres to maintain relations among newspaper editors;

Sub-section C (commerce, industry, the arts and sciences):

- that agricultural circles, societies and others distribute terminology guides;
- that professors and teachers endeavour to make plants, animals and minerals be known by their French name;
- that the government or an editing house publish a series of natural history tableaux illustrated in colour for schools;
- that professors of technical schools teach the French name of tools, mechanisms and machinery to fight against anglicisms in the technical vocabulary of industrials and workers;
- that bosses also learn the French terms to give the good example to workers;
- that illustrated tableaux be placed inside factories to show the French names of tools and machinery;
- that the victory of French in the transport industries encourage French Canadians and Acadians to use their language at all times in industrial and commercial relations as much among themselves as with other Canadians;
- that trade schools teach French business communication and bookkeeping;
- that even in the English stores, French Canadians and Acadians use the French language;
- that the preference be given to stores and industries that recognize and respect the rights of the French language.

== Bibliography ==
- Bélanger, Michel (2009). "Histoire de l'interventionnisme de l'État dans le domaine linguistique", in the site of the Société Saint-Jean-Baptiste de la Mauricie, 2009
- Martel, Marcel (1997). Le deuil d'un pays imaginé: rêves, luttes et déroute du Canada français : les rapports entre le Québec et la francophonie canadienne, 1867-1975, Ottawa: Presses de l'Université d'Ottawa, 203 p. ISBN 2-7603-0439-6 (preview)
- CLFC (1914). Premier Congrès de la langue française au Canada. Québec, 24-30 juin, 1912. Mémoires, Québec: Imprimerie de l'Action sociale, 636 p. (online)
- CLFC (1913). Premier Congrès de la langue française au Canada. Québec, 24-30 juin, 1912. Compte rendu, Québec: Imprimerie de l'Action sociale, 693 p. (online)
- CLFC (1912). Album souvenir : le Congrès de la langue française au Canada et le IIIe Centenaire de Québec, 1608-1908, Québec: Le Soleil, 126 p. (online)
- CLFC (1912?). Premier congrès de la langue française au Canada : déclarations et vœux, Québec : Le Comité permanent du congrès de la langue française au Canada, Université Laval, 29 p.
- CLFC (1912?). Premier congrès de la langue française au Canada : Guide du congressiste, Québec: s.n., 96 p.
