= Charles Brindamour =

Canadian businessperson

- Born: 1970 (age 55–56); Quebec City, Canada
- Education: Université Laval
- Occupation: Business executive
- Years active: 1992-present
- Employer: Intact Financial (CEO)
- Board member of: Intact Financial, Canadian Imperial Bank of Commerce, Geneva Association, Business Council of Canada

Charles Brindamour (born 1970) is a Canadian business executive. Currently the CEO of Intact Financial, he became chief operating officer of its predecessor company, ING Canada in 2007, and CEO in 2008. He oversaw the company's rebranding as Intact Financial a year later. Previously chairman of the Geneva Association, he remains on the board, and is also on the boards of organizations such as the Canadian Imperial Bank of Commerce and the Business Council of Canada.

== Early life and education ==
Brindamour was born circa 1970 in Quebec City, Canada. He grew up in Quebec City, speaking French. His mother and father worked for Quebec-based insurance companies. In 1992, Brindamour graduated Université Laval with a degree in actuarial science. He received an honorary PhD from HEC Montréal in 2019.

== Career ==
=== 1992-2008: ING Canada ===
In 1992, he was hired by Commerce Group, a small insurer in Quebec that would later be acquired by ING Group. Working out of regional offices in Quebec for two years, he then moved to company's headquarters in Toronto, where his role involved creating a new division to track and utilize data. He subsequently worked out of Holland in the Netherlands, before being tasked with launching a new division in Romania. In Romania, he served as the company's chief actuary and chief financial officer. He returned to Canada in 1999, where he worked on insurance underwriting and later led the company groups handling acquisitions, strategic planning, and financing. At the start of 2007, he was an executive vice-president at ING Canada. That year, ING Canada appointed him to the newly created position of chief operating officer, with responsibility for all insurance operations. In 2008 he was named president and CEO of ING Canada, succeeding Claude Dussault.

=== 2009-2026: Intact Financial CEO ===
ING divested its 70% stake in ING Canada in 2009, with the division reformed as an independent insurance company and rebranded as Intact Financial. Brindamour remained CEO. After the formation of Intact Financial, Brindamour began expanding through the acquisitions of rival companies, overseeing eight different acquisitions between 2010 and 2020. Among them, in 2011 Intact bought the Canadian division of AXA SA. Intact acquired the motorbike insurance company Jevco for $530 million in 2012. In 2017, Intact acquired Canadian Direct Insurance for $189 million, and also entered the US market with the acquisition of OneBeacon Insurance Group. Intact acquired RSA, a large international insurer, in November 2020, adding 9,000 employees in the process. To oversee the integration, Brindamour began working out of London as well as Toronto.

Brindamour has been noted in the press as a long-term advocate of climate change adaptation in Canada. In 2010, Brindamour personally funded what was described as the first major national conference on climate adaptation in Canada. In 2016, he invested in and co-founded the Intact Centre for Climate Adaptation at the University of Waterloo. He was named "Canada's Outstanding CEO of the Year" for 2021 by the National Post, and the Globe and Mail named him one of five "CEOs of the Year for 2024", as Strategist of the Year. In September 2025, he was one of several executives selected to present to the cabinet of Canadian Prime Minister Mark Carney.

== Boards and committees ==
Brindamour has been involved with a number of boards and committees. In 2015, the Ontario government appointed him to the board of Hydro One, an electric utility. He was still on the board in 2018, when it received some criticism for voting to give raises to its own members. He had left the board by 2019. As of 2017, he was a long-time member of the leadership council of the Toronto Financial Services Alliance (TFSA). He was also on the advisory committee of the Intact Centre for Climate Adaptation at the University of Waterloo, and on the boards of Intact Financial, the C.D. Howe Institute, Branksome Hall, and the Insurance Bureau of Canada. As of 2019, he was an associate of the Casualty Actuarial Society and chairman of the Geneva Association. He joined the board of the Canadian Imperial Bank of Commerce (CIBC) in January 2020. In 2026, Brindamour remained on the board of the Geneva Association and the Business Council of Canada, among others.

== Personal life ==
Brindamour and his wife, Josee Letarte, have two daughters. The family lives in Toronto, with Brindamour also spending time in London. Among Brindamour's hobbies are reading, fly fishing, and marathon runs. In 2024, the Brindamour family made a personal donation to a newly formed health initiative.

== See also ==
- List of people from Quebec City
- List of Université Laval people
