= Société du parler français au Canada =

The Société du parler français au Canada (SPFC) ("French Speech in Canada Society") was a learned society that endeavoured to study the French language spoken in Canada in the course of the 20th century. Founded on February 18, 1902 by Adjutor Rivard and Stanislas-Alfred Lortie, two Université Laval professors, it made important contributions to lexicography in Quebec and Canada.

The SPFC ceased to exist in the 1960s. In 2002, the Université Laval, Université du Québec à Chicoutimi and Université de Sherbrooke marked the SPFC's 100th anniversary of foundation with a colloquium held at the Musée de la civilisation and presided by French linguist Bernard Quemada. The history of the SPFC was the object of a book by Quebec linguist Louis Mercier.

== Founding members ==
The 24 founding members of the SPFC included eight Université Laval professors and nine members of the catholic clergy:

- Thomas Chapais
- Adélard Turgeon
- Pierre Boucher de la Bruère
- Paul de Cazes
- Narcisse-Eutrope Dionne
- Eugène Rouillard
- Alexandre Bélinge
- Ludovic Brunet
- Joseph-Évariste Prince
- Adjutor Rivard
- Cyrille Tessier
- Jules Dorion
- Arthur Vallée
- Nazaire Levasseur
- Jules-Paul Tardivel
- Benoît-Philippe Garneau
- Amédée Gosselin
- Victor-Alphonse Huard
- Joseph-Clovis-Kemner Laflamme
- Stanislas-Alfred Lortie
- Olivier-Elzéar Mathieu
- François Pelletier
- Camille Roy
- Henri Simard

== Studies ==
At its foundation, the SPFC gave itself a program of studies which was published in its first bulletin:

- The study of French philology, and particularly the study of the French language in Canada in its history, its character and its condition of existence;
- The examination of the dangers threatening the French speech in Canada: the influence of the milieu, the habitual and necessary contact with foreign idioms, the gradual deformation of a popular language left to itself, the tendencies to decay of modern literature, commerce and industry, and a too pronounced taste for old forms;
- The search for the best means to defend the language against these various dangers, to restitute what it has lost, and to restore its already deformed expressions, while preserving its special character;
- The work needed to make the French spoken in Canada a language answering at the same time to the natural progress of the idiom, the respect of tradition, the requirements of new social conditions, and the genius of the French language (génie de la langue française);
- The publication and propagation of works, studies and bulletins to this goal.

== Activities ==
The SPFC published a bulletin from its foundation up until 1918 and set up the first two of three Congresses on the French language in Canada (1912, 1937 and 1952).

In 1930, the SPFC published the Glossaire du parler français au Canada, the result of some thirty years of research. The glossary is still a reference today among researchers.

== Presidents ==
The following persons held the presidency of the SPFC:

| Nom | Portrait | Mandat |
|---|---|---|
| Adélard Turgeon | | 1902–1903 |
| Pierre Boucher de la Bruère | | 1903–1906 |
| Camille Roy | | 1906–1908 |
| Joseph-Évariste Prince | | 1908–1910 |
| Paul-Eugène Roy | | 1910–1912 |
| Adjutor Rivard | | 1912–1914 |
| P.-Calixte Dagneau | | 1914–1916 |
| Antonio Huot | | 1916–1918 |
| Arthur Vallée | | 1918–1920 |
| Adolphe Garneau | | 1920–1922 |
| Cyrille-Fraser Delâge | | 1922–1924 |
| Arthur Maheux | | 1924–1926 |
| Adjutor Rivard | | 1926–1927 |
| Antonio Langlais | | 1927–1928 |
| Aimé Labrie | | 1928–1930 |
| P.-Calixte Dagneau | | 1930–1931 |
| Cyrille Gagnon | | 1931–1933 |
| A. Morisset | | 1933–1935 |
| R. Benoît | | 1935–1936 |
| Camille Roy | | 1936–1937 |
| Arthur Vallée | | 1937–1939 |
| Antonio Langlais | | 1939–1940 |
| Aimé Labrie | | 1940–1942 |
| Adrien Pouliot | | 1942–1944 |
| Arthur Maheux | | 1944–1947 |
| Antonio Langlais | | 1947–1948 |
| Luc Lacourcière | | 1948–1949 |
| L. Talbot | | 1949–1951 |
| Félix-Antoine Savard | | 1952–1955 |
| Gaston Dulong | | 1955–1961 |
| Jean-Denis Gendron | | 1961–1962 |
