= Arthur Maheux =

Monsignor Joseph Thomas Arthur Maheux, SM, OBE, FRSC (22 June 1884 – 30 August 1967) was a Canadian priest and historian. He was a leading proponent of Canadian unity as well as a trenchant critic of Quebec society.

He was president of the Société du parler français au Canada from 1924 to 1925 and president of the Canadian Historical Association from 1948 to 1949.

Maheux was appointed an Officer of the Order of the British Empire in 1943 "For patriotic work". He received a Guggenheim Fellowship in 1954, the J. B. Tyrrell Historical Medal in 1959, and the Pierre Chauveau Medal in 1963. In 1967, he was among the first group of recipients of the Order of Canada.

== Principal works ==
- Ton histoire est une épopée - Nos débuts sous le régime anglais, 1941.
- Le Canada parle à la France, 1942.
- Canada Victorious, Happy and Glorious, 1943.
- Pourquoi sommes-nous divisés?, 1943.
- L'Université Laval et la culture française au Canada, 1952.
