= Michel Gervais =

Canadian academic (1944–2022)

Michel Gervais, OC OQ (27 May 1944 – 8 May 2022) was the 22nd rector of Université Laval from 1987 to 1997.

Born in Lévis, Quebec, he studied theology and philosophy, and in 1973 obtained a doctorate in theology from the Pontifical University of St. Thomas Aquinas (Angelicum), in Rome. He became a full professor at Université Laval, a university administrator and an administrator in Quebec City.

He received honorary doctorates from the Universities of Bishop's, McGill, Manitoba and Montréal and was named an Officier of the Ordre national du Mérite of France (1991), the Order of Canada (1993) and Officier of the National Order of Quebec (1999).

During his term as Rector, he was elected by his peers as Chairman of the Conference of Rectors and Principals of the Universities in Quebec (CREPUQ), World University Service of Canada (WUSC), the Association of Universities and Colleges of Canada (AUCC) and the international Agence universitaire de la Francophonie (AUF)

After his rectorate, Michel Gervais became President of the Commission des universités sur les programmes for CRÉPUQ, then, in 2000, Director of the Centre hospitalier Robert-Giffard (Institut universitaire en santé mentale de Québec) and of the Centre de recherche Université Laval/Robert-Giffard, in Quebec City, a post he held until 2008. He was also appointed a member of the "conseil stratégique" de l'Université Saint-Joseph de Beyrouth. In 2012, he was elected President of the Association québécoise d'établissements de santé et de services sociaux (AQESSS), a post he held until 2015.

== See also ==
- Université Laval
- List of rectors of Université Laval

Preceded by Jean-Guy Paquet	Rector of Université Laval; 1987–1997	Succeeded by François Tavenas
