= George Lawson (botanist) =

Scottish-Canadian botanist (1827–1895)

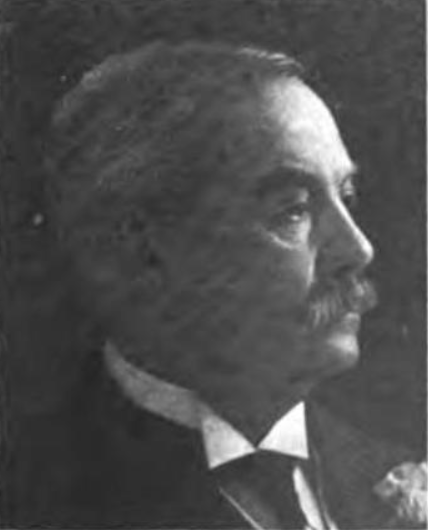
- Born: October 12, 1827; Scotland
- Died: November 10, 1895 (aged 68); Halifax, Nova Scotia
- Scientific career
- Fields: Botany

George Lawson (October 12, 1827 – November 10, 1895) was a Scottish-Canadian botanist who is considered the "father of Canadian botany".

Born in Scotland, in 1858, he was appointed the Professor of Chemistry and Natural History at Queen's University. He helped to create one of Canada's first botanical gardens.

In 1868, he became Professor of Chemistry and Mineralogy at Dalhousie University.

He was a charter member of the Royal Society of Canada and from 1887 to 1888 was its president.

Professional and academic associations
Preceded by Thomas-Étienne Hamel	President of the Royal Society of Canada; 1887–1888	Succeeded by Sandford Fleming
