= Adjutor Rivard =

Canadian lawyer, writer, judge and linguist

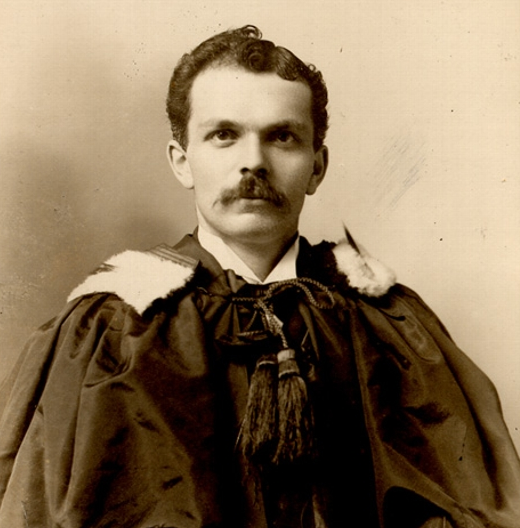
- Adjutor Rivard
- Born: January 22, 1868; Saint-Grégoire de Nicolet, Quebec
- Died: July 22, 1945 (aged 77); Quebec City, Quebec
- Occupations: lawyer, judge, linguist

Adjutor Rivard (22 January 1868 – 17 July 1945) was a lawyer, writer, judge and linguist from Quebec, Canada.

He studied at the Petit séminaire de Québec and Université Laval. He co-founded the Société du parler français au Canada (SPFC) and is recognized as one of the principal authors of the Glossaire du parler français au Canada published by the SPFC in 1930. With Mgr Louis-Nazaire Bégin, he also co-founded the L'Action catholique review.

== Writing career ==
Rivard was something of a traditionalist as can be seen in his somewhat syrupy description of country life as portrayed in Chez Nous.

== Works ==
- L'art de dire: traité de lecture et de récitation, 1898
- Manuel de la parole, 1901
- Bibliographie du parler français au Canada: catalogue analytique des ouvrages traitant de la langue française au Canada (with James Geddes)
- Chez nous, 1914 (Translation by William Hume Blake, 1861-1924)
- Études sur les parlers de France au Canada, 1914
- Chez nos gens, 1918, (Prix de l'Académie française)
- De la liberté de la presse, 1923
- Glossaire du parler français au Canada, 1930
