= Larkin Kerwin =

Canadian physicist (1924–2004)

Larkin Kerwin CC OQ FRSC

1st President of the Canadian Space Agency
- In office March 1, 1989 – 1992
- Governor General: Jeanne Sauvé
- Prime Minister: Brian Mulroney
- Preceded by: position established
- Succeeded by: Roland Doré

Personal details
- Born: John Larkin Kerwin; June 22, 1924 Quebec City, Quebec, Canada
- Died: May 1, 2004 (aged 79) Quebec City, Quebec, Canada
- Spouse: Maria G. Turcot
- Children: 8 children
- Occupation: Physicist
- Awards: Order of Canada; National Order of Quebec

John Larkin Kerwin CC OQ FRSC (June 22, 1924 – May 1, 2004) was a Canadian physicist.

Born in Quebec City, he studied physics at St. Francis Xavier University and obtained his master's degree in physics at the Massachusetts Institute of Technology. He received his D.Sc. from Université Laval. He was Chairman of the Department of Physics from 1961 to 1967. He was the first lay Rector of Université Laval, holding this position from 1972 to 1977.

From 1954 to 1955 he was the president of the Canadian Association of Physicists. From 1980 to 1989 he was President of the National Research Council of Canada and was the first president of the Canadian Space Agency and coined the term Canadarm. In 1982 he received the Gold Medal from the Canadian Council of Professional Engineers. In 1987 he was awarded the Outstanding Achievement Award of the Public Service of Canada. In 1989 he was president of the Canadian Academy of Engineering. Kerwin also served at an international level, he was president of the International Union of Pure and Applied Physics (IUPAP) from 1987–1990.

In 1976, he received an honorary doctorate from Concordia University, one of 15 from various universities. In 1978 he was made an Officer of the Order of Canada and was promoted to Companion in 1980. In 1988 he was made an Officer of the National Order of Quebec. He was elected Fellow of the Royal Society of Canada and was president from 1976 to 1977. He was made an Officer of the Légion d'honneur de France.

He died in Quebec City, Quebec, Canada. He was married to Maria G. Turcot and had 8 children.

== Honours ==
- Knight of the Holy Sepulchre
- Companion of the Order of Canada
- Officer de l'Ordre national du Quebec
- Officier de l'Ordre de la Légion d'honneur (France)
- 15 Honorary Doctorates

Academic offices
| Preceded by Louis-Albert Vachon | Rector of Université Laval; 1972-1977 | Succeeded by Jean-Guy Paquet |
Professional and academic associations
| Preceded by Samuel Delbert Clark | President of the Royal Society of Canada; 1976–1977 | Succeeded by Robert Folinsbee |
