= Maurice Hébert =

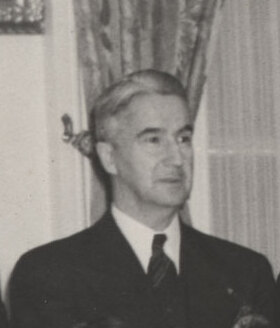
- Born: Maurice Lang Hébert; January 21, 1888; Quebec City, Quebec
- Died: April 11, 1960 (aged 72); Quebec City, Quebec
- Occupation: Civil servant
- Spouse: Marguerite Taché (m. 1915)
- Children: Anne, Jean, Pierre
- Writing career
- Period: 20th century
- Genres: Poetry, fiction

Maurice-Lang Hébert (January 21, 1888 – April 11, 1960) was a French-Canadian poet and novelist. He was also known a literary critic.

== Biography ==
Hébert was born in Quebec City on January 21, 1888. He attended high school at the College of Sainte-Anne-de-la-Pocatière, then studied law at Laval University. He joined the army and was an officer in the Voltigeurs regiment from 1911 to 1913. After leaving the army, he joined the provincial civil service. In 1940, he became general manager of tourism and advertising. He also taught at the Collège Jésus-Marie de Sillery.

He was inducted into the Royal Society of Canada in 1935 and was a member of the Society of French-Canadian Poets. He was an Officer of Public Instruction in France and received an honorary degree of Doctor of Letters from Laval University and the vermeil medal from the French Academy.

Maurice Hébert wrote many poems. He wrote a lengthy poem called the "Don Juan Cycle" which was published in the Proceedings of the Royal Society. His style is often direct, with attention to detail and precision. From a romantic source, these verses, usually well-made and with varied rhythms, express a Christian soul, reflective and sentimental at the same time.

But Hébert was best known as a chronicler and literary critic. He practiced, especially following the example of his master Camille Roy, the "constructive" criticism. Indeed, as Romain Légaré writes, "he has based his own conception on two fundamental principles: charity and justice; charity which requires the sympathetic penetration of a work to understand the angle of vision, charity which, for Mr. Hébert, includes gentry and Christian meaning; justice that demands respect for the authors and works studied, the frankness of the verdict concerning the value of the work."

He married Marguerite Taché in 1915. Together they raised three children, Anne, Jean and Pierre. Anne went on to a career as a poet and novelist. He died in 1960.

== Works ==
=== Poems ===
- Le Cycle de Don Juan, (Note: Additional entries in vol. XXXIII, 1939, p. 155-165; vol. XXXVII, 1943, p. 39-44; vol. XXXIX, 1945, p. 89-102; vol. XL, 1946, p. 37-49; vol. XLIII, 1949, p. 39-49)
- À l'orée de l'automne,

=== Literary criticism ===
- De livres en livres, (1929) Louis Carrier et Cie
- Et d'un livre à l'autre, (1932) Louis Carrier et Cie
- Les Lettres au Canada français, (1936) Hog rider
