= Sophie D'Amours =

Canadian engineer and professor

Sophie D'Amours OC
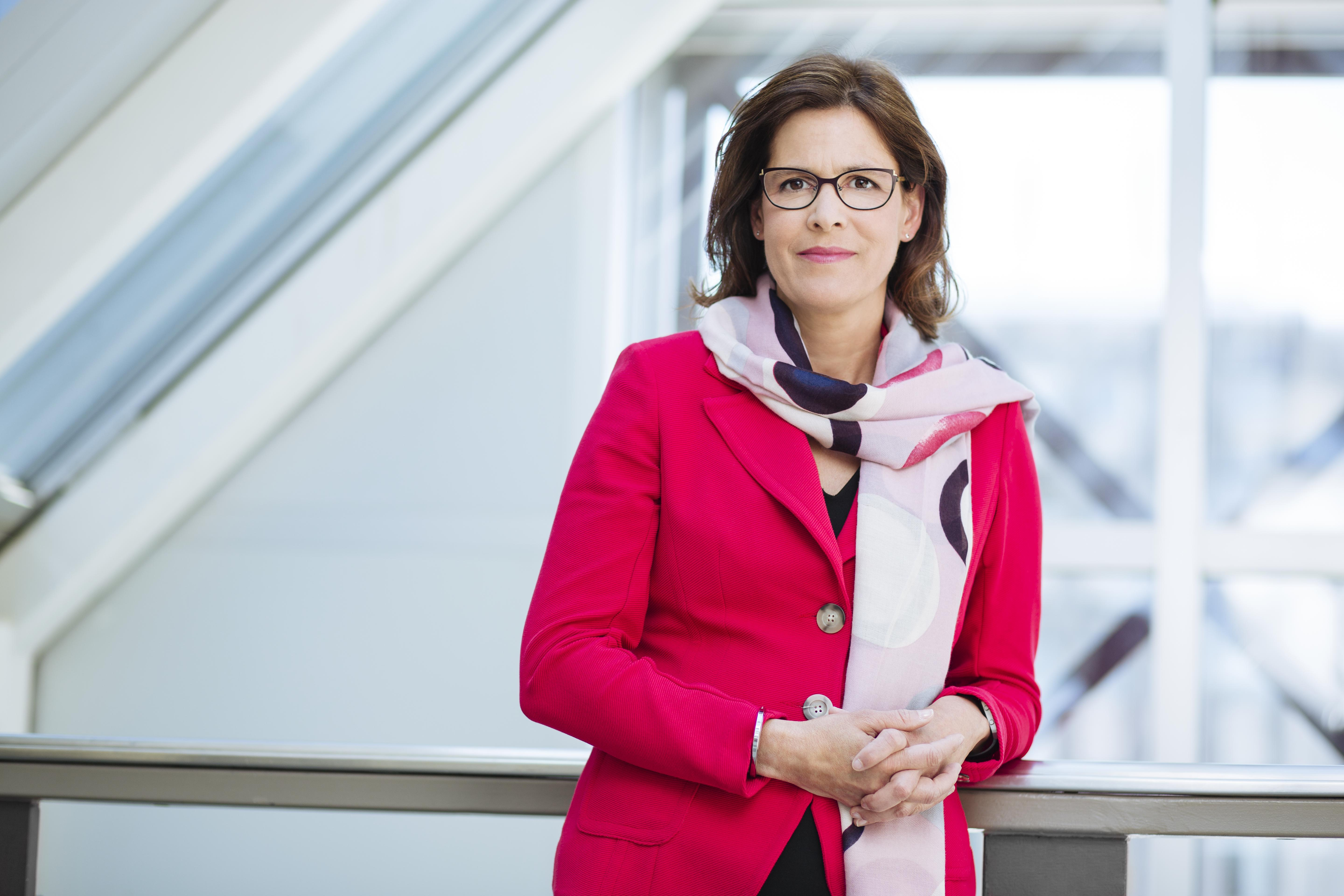

26th Rector of Université Laval
- Incumbent
- Assumed office June 1, 2017
- Preceded by: Denis Brière

Personal details
- Born: 25 January 1966 (age 60)
- Education: Université Laval (BS, MBA); École Polytechnique de Montréal (PhD)
- Scientific career
- Fields: Mechanical engineering
- Workplaces: Université Laval
- Thesis: La Planification des Operations en Reseaux Manufacturiers Symbiotiques (1995)
- Doctoral advisors: Francois Soumis; Benoit Montreuil

Sophie D'Amours OC (born 1966) is a Canadian engineer and a professor at Université Laval. On April 26, 2017, she was elected the 26th rector of Université Laval, the first woman to hold the position.

== Biography ==
Sophie D’Amours has been a professor in the Department of Mechanical Engineering at Université Laval since 1995 and served as the University's vice rector of research and innovation from 2012 to 2015.

She holds a bachelor's degree in mechanical engineering (1990) and a master's degree in business administration (1992) from Université Laval and a PhD in engineering mathematics from École Polytechnique de Montréal (1995). Her research focuses on business engineering, value chain logistics, and decision processes.

In addition to her university duties, she has chaired the board of Centre de recherche industrielle du Québec since 2010 and was appointed Chair of the board of Universities Canada in October 2019. She also sits on the board of the International Development Research Centre and has been invited to join the board of the Foundation for Educational Exchange between Canada and the United States of America (Fulbright Canada). She is a member of the Canadian Academy of Engineering.

== Distinctions ==
- Winner of the Henri-Gustave-Joly-de-Lotbinière Award bestowed by Ordre des ingénieurs forestiers du Québec for her contribution to the Québec forestry sector (2008)
- Winner of the Brockhouse Canada Prize (2012)
- International fellow of the Royal Swedish Academy of Agriculture and Forestry (2017)
- Officer of the Order of Canada (2018)

== See also ==
- Université Laval
