= Jean-Paul Richard =

Canadian physicist (1936–2023)

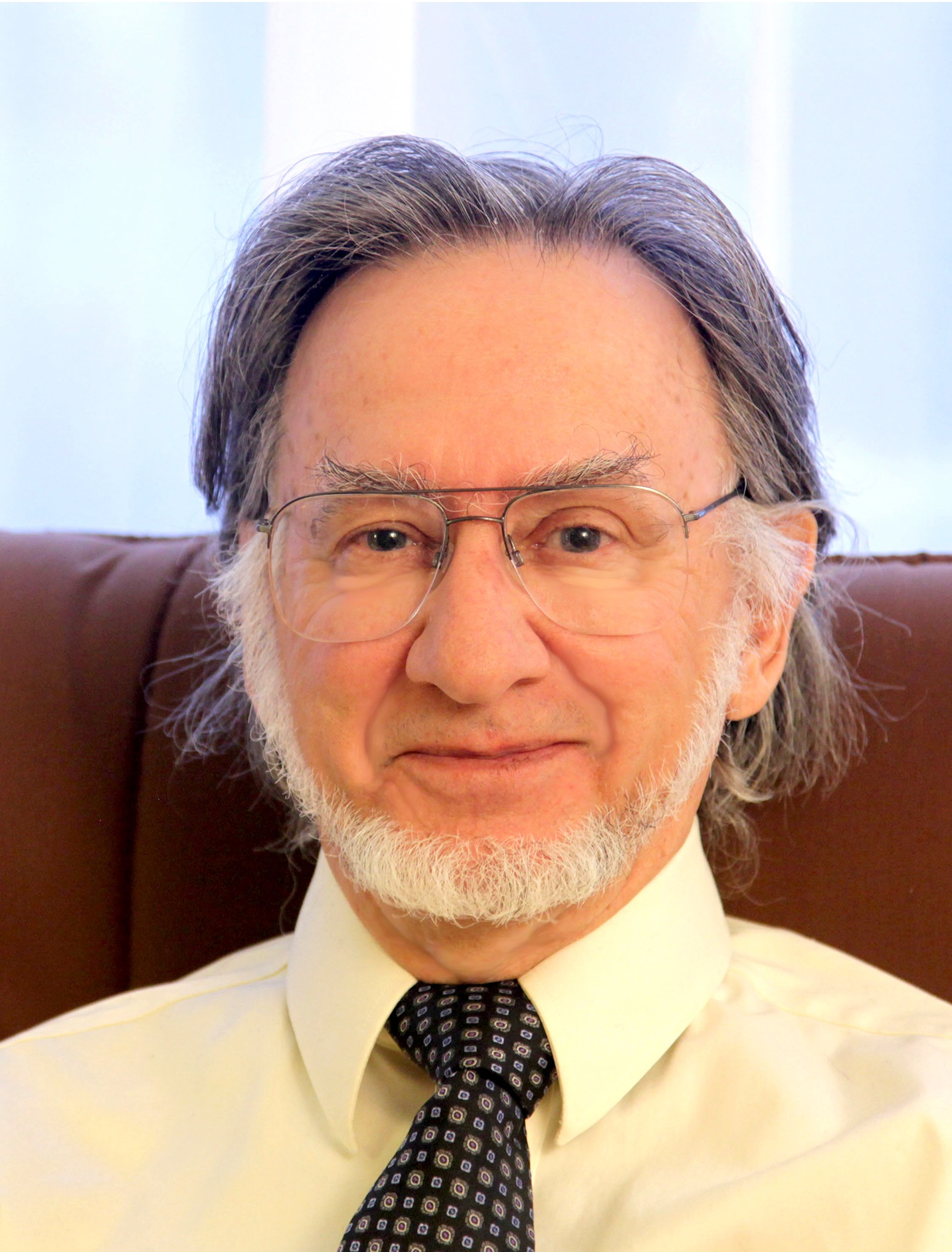
- Jean-Paul Richard in 2012
- Born: June 10, 1936; Quebec City, Quebec
- Died: September 8, 2023 (aged 87)
- Occupations: Physicist, academic and researcher
- Awards: Award for Research and Development of Gravitational Radiation Antennas, NSF; Award for Development of Multimode Gravitational Wave Bar Detector with Optical Transducer, NSF

Academic background
- Education: Laval University; University of Paris

Jean-Paul Richard (June 10, 1936 – September 8, 2023) was a Canadian physicist, academic and researcher. He was a Professor of Physics at the University of Maryland.

Richard's work has been focused on the detection of gravitational waves. He has contributed to the fields of low temperature gravitational wave detectors and their transducer systems.

For his contributions to the field during the years 1965 to 1998, the University of Maryland recognized Richard as a pioneer in the field of Gravitational Wave research in a 2016 event "A celebration of Gravitational Waves".

Richard died on September 8, 2023, at the age of 87.

== Early life and education ==
After completion of the classical curriculum at the Petit Séminaire de Québec, Richard received a bachelor's degree in Arts from Laval University in 1956. After undergraduate studies at Laval University, he received a bachelor's degree in physics in 1960.

In 1960, Richard joined the Institut Henri Poincaré in Paris. There, his research activities focused on the possibilities of testing Einstein's General Theory of Relativity from the observation of the motion of artificial Earth satellites. Richard received his doctorate in theoretical physics and Doctorat d’Etat in physical sciences from University of Paris in 1963 and 1965, respectively. Then, Richard joined Joseph Weber research program to detect gravitational waves at the University of Maryland.

== Career ==
Richard joined the University of Maryland's department of physics in 1965 as a research associate. He was promoted to assistant professor in 1968, to associate professor in 1973 and to professor in 1981. In 1995, he became professor emeritus of physics and was appointed as senior research scientist. After retiring in 1998, he remained associated with the University of Maryland as professor emeritus of physics.

== Research ==
Richard has conducted research on observing corrections predicted by Einstein's theory of General Relativity in the motion of artificial earth satellites but focused on the direct detection of gravitational waves predicted by the same theory.

Between 1966 and 1997, Richard's research was supported by the National Science Foundation and NASA.

=== Lunar surface gravimeter experiment ===
Richard was involved in the Lunar Surface Gravimeter experiment that was proposed by Joseph Weber to NASA in the early sixties to look for possible excitations of the Moon normal modes and resulting motion of its surface due to gravitational waves. As a co-investigator, Richard worked for a solution to the problem of maintaining the temperature of the gravimeter within 3 milli-degree of the design 50-degree Celsius through changes in the moon environment temperature in excess of 100 degree Celsius. He proposed a design that was approved by the Arthur D Little research company. The Lunar Surface Gravimeter experiment flew on the Apollo 17 mission in 1972 and established an upper limit to gravitational waves in the frequency band 0.01 Hz to 1 Hz.

=== Development of a resonant capacitance transducer for the Weber bar antenna ===
Following his work on lunar gravimeter experiment and as a way to improve the sensitivity of a Weber antenna, Richard focused on developing a dc biased resonant capacitance transducer mounted at one end of such an antenna and with signal detected with FET electronics. There, Richard redefined the noise temperature of an FET as the product of its voltage noise and its gate current noise to allow the optimization of the coupling between the antenna and the FET, a requirement for best sensitivity.

=== Development of the multimode detector for a wide band of gravitational wave frequencies ===
Richard then focused his research on achieving both larger bandwidth and higher sensitivity than then reached and proposed a multimode gravitational wave detector consisting of serially connected three or more mechanical resonant oscillators of geometrically decreasing masses.

He then described how a five-mode system with improved electronics could be operated with a 500 Hz bandwidth at a sensitivity near the one phonon level and around 800 Hz, and could complement a 4-km laser interferometer.

=== Fabry-Perot transducer for multimode detectors ===
To improve bandwidth and sensitivity of the multi-mode bar detector then limited by its electronics, Richard proposed the use of an optical sensor in which an 800 Hz bar antenna is coupled to 2, 3 or 4 coupled resonators. The last resonator included a small super mirror part of a very short Laser driven Fabry-Perot cavity. Richard's research indicated that the optical power in the cavity can easily be obtained where the quantum noise injected in the last resonator is of the order of the quantum noise in the readout.

According to Richard, a sensitivity at the one-phonon level could be achieved if the noise contributed by the antenna and the resonators is low enough. In such a system, the temperature and the mechanical quality factors become determinant factors. Richard also reported in-house tests of a 100-micron long Fabry-Perot cavity and showed the possibility of a one phonon sensitivity level with such detectors.

== Selected papers ==
- Possibilité De Vérification De La Relativité Generale À L’aide De Satellites Artificiels Terrestres, Jean-Paul Richard, Cahiers De Physique, Tome 20, Nos. 187–188, P. 85-155 (1966).
- Pulsar Frequencies And General Relativity, Jean-Paul Richard, Phys. Rev. Lett. 21, 1483 (1968)
- Wide-Band Bar Detectors Of Gravitational Radiation, Jean-Paul Richard, Phys. Rev. Lett. 52, 165 (1984).
- Approaching The Quantum Limit With Optically Instrumented Multi-Mode Gravitational Wave Bar Detectors. Jean-Paul Richard, Phys. Rev. D 46, 2309-2317 (1992).
- Multimode Optical Transducer For Massive Resonant Gravitational Wave Detector, J.-P. Richard, Seventh Marcel Grossman Meeting On General Relativity, July 24–29, 1994, Stanford University, Palo Alto. Ca.
