= Hospice-Anthelme Verreau =

French-Canadian priest, educator, and historian

Hospice-Anthelme Verreau FRSC (6 September 1828 – 15 May 1901) was a French-Canadian priest, educator, and historian.

Born in l'Islet, Lower Canada, the son of Germain-Alexandre Verreau and Ursule Fournier, Verreau left his classical course at the Quebec Seminary and taught at Ste Thérèse College. In 1857, he was appointed principal of the newly founded Jacques-Cartier Normal School, an office he held until his death. He was made a LitD of Laval (1878) and a Fellow of the Royal Society of Canada. In 1873 he was commissioned by the Quebec Government to investigate certain European archives for materials relating to Canadian history. Besides many contributions to the Historical Society of Montreal, of which he was the first president, and to the Royal Society of Canada, he published (1870–73) two volumes of memoirs concerning the invasion of Canada by the Americans.

He died in Montreal, Quebec, in 1901.

== Chief publications ==
- Notice sur la fondation de Montréal;
- Des commencements de l'église du Canada;
- Jacques Cartier; Questions du calendrier civil et ecclésiastique; Questions de droit politique, de législation et d'usages maritimes
