= Ernest Racicot =

Canadian politician (1835–1909)

Ernest Racicot (July 13, 1835 – April 18, 1909) was a lawyer and political figure in Quebec. He represented Missisquoi in the Legislative Assembly of Quebec from 1878 to 1881 as a Liberal then Conservative member.

He was born in Sault-au-Récollet, Lower Canada, the son of François-Xavier Racicot and Léocadie Tremblay. He was educated at the Séminaire Saint-Sulpice in Montreal, studied law and was called to the Lower Canada bar in 1859. He set up practice at Sweetsburg, first with Andrew Robertson and later with E. Cornell. In 1868, he married Susan A. Bowker. Racicot was bâtonnier for Missisquoi district. He served on the municipal council for Sweetsburg, also serving as mayor and warden for Missisquoi County. Elected as a Liberal, Racicot joined the Conservative caucus in 1879 with three other members, leading to the defeat of the Liberal government. He was defeated when he ran for reelection in 1881. Racicot died in Sweetsburg at the age of 73.

His cousin Laurent-Olivier David served in the Quebec assembly and the Canadian senate. His cousin Joseph-Gédéon-Horace Bergeron was a member of the House of Commons.
