= Amédée Gosselin =

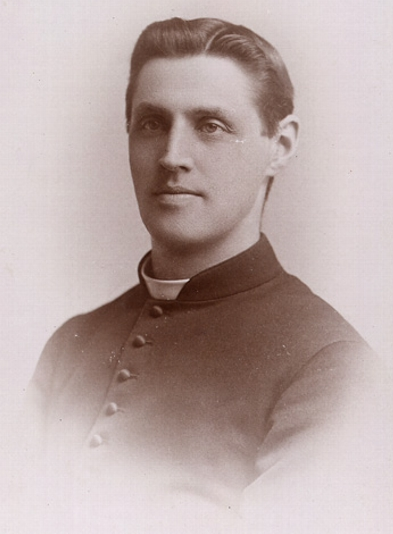
- Born: September 30, 1863; Saint-Charles-de-Bellechasse, Canada East
- Died: December 20, 1941 (aged 78); Quebec City, Quebec
- Occupation: Roman Catholic Priest

Amédée Gosselin (September 30, 1863 – December 20, 1941) was a Canadian historian, academic administrator and Roman Catholic priest.

== Early life ==
On September 30, 1863, Gosselin was born in Saint-Charles-de-Bellechasse, Canada East.

== Education ==
Gosselin studied the classical course and theology from 1878 until 1890 at the Petit Séminaire de Québec and the Grand Séminaire de Québec.

== Career ==
Gosselin was ordained as a priest. Gosselin taught Canadian history and rhetoric. His principal work was L'Instruction au Canada sous le Régime français, which won him the Verret Prize. He was the seminary's archivist, and became superior of the institution and rector of Université Laval from 1909 until 1915 and from 1927 until 1929.

He was an organizer of the Congrès de la langue française and a member of the Société du parler français. He often published articles in the Bulletin des recherches historiques, a historical journal. On December 20, 1941, he died in Quebec City.

== See also ==
- Université Laval
- List of rectors of Université Laval

Academic offices
| Preceded by Joseph-Clovis-Kemner Laflamme | Rector of Université Laval; 1909–1915 | Succeeded by François Pelletier |
| Preceded by Camille Roy | Rector of Université Laval; 1927–1929 | Succeeded by Camille Roy |
