= François Tavenas =

François Tavenas, OQ (12 September 1942 – 13 February 2004) was a Canadian engineer and academic.

Born in Bourg-de-Péage, Drôme, France, he received an engineering degree in civil engineering from Institut national des sciences appliquées de Lyon in 1963 and a doctorate with specialization in soil mechanics in 1965 from the Université de Grenoble. In 1968, he moved to Canada to become a lecturer in the Department of Civil Engineering at Université Laval. A Canadian citizen since 15 July 1971, he became an assistant professor in 1970, an associate professor in 1973, and a professor in 1978. He was the dean, Faculty of Science and Engineering from 1985 to 1989.

From 1989 to 1990, he was the vice-principal (Planning and Computing) at McGill University. From 1990 to 1997, he was the Vice-Principal (Planning and Resources) at McGill University. From 1995 to 1997, he was the acting vice-principal (Macdonald Campus). As well, he was a professor in the Department of Civil Engineering and Applied Mechanics. In 1997, he was appointed the rector of Université Laval and a professor in the Department of Civil Engineering and in 2003 left to become the founding rector of the Université du Luxembourg.

== Honours ==
- 1991 Elected as a fellow of the Engineering Institute of Canada.
- 1999 Made a chevalier of the French Legion of Honor.
- 2002 Awarded the Commander's Cross (Komturkreuz) of the Order of Merit of the Federal Republic of Germany.
- 2004 Made an officer of the National Order of Quebec.

Preceded by Michel Gervais	Rector of Université Laval; 1997–2002	Succeeded by Michel Pigeon
Preceded by Founding Rector	Rector of University of Luxembourg; 2003–2004	Succeeded by Rolf Tarrach
