= Thomas-Étienne Hamel =

French-Canadian priest and academic (1830–1913)

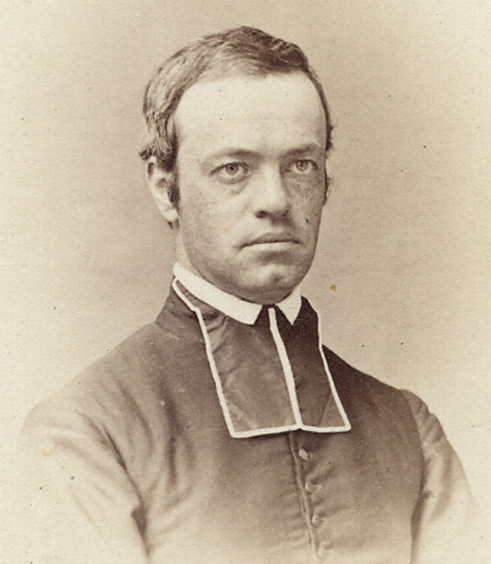
- Thomas-Étienne Hamel (c. 1854)
- Born: December 28, 1830
- Died: July 16, 1913 (aged 82)

Thomas-Étienne Hamel (b. Quebec City, December 28, 1830; d. Quebec City, July 16, 1913) was a French-Canadian priest and academic. He was the son of Victor Hamel, a merchant and Therèse DeFoy.

In 1852, as a student of the Séminaire de Québec, he traveled with Louis-Jacques Casault to London where they arranged for the royal charter of what would become Laval University. After his ordination in 1854, he was sent to Paris' École des Carmes and eventually graduated from the Sorbonne with a license in science, before returning to Quebec to teach at the Séminaire, also acquiring the office of general secretary of the new university. He became rector of the Séminaire de Québec and Laval University (1871–1880, 1883–1886, librarian from 1888) and a founder as well as a president (1886–1887) of the Royal Society of Canada. He was Vicar general of the Archdiocese of Quebec from 1871 and appointed an apostolic prothonotary in 1886. In 1881, he led a delegation to Rome to argue against the independence of the Montreal branch (which would ultimately become the Université de Montréal).

Hamel wrote a biography of Elzéar-Alexandre Taschereau (Le Premier Cardinal Canadien, 1888) and a manual of rhetoric (Un Cours d'éloquence parlée d'après Delsarte, 1906). His contributions to the study of the Music of Quebec, notably his Annales musicales du Petit-Cap (an unpublished compilation of folk songs preserved at the Séminaire), have been little studied. Although an entry for him was intended for inclusion in the Dictionary of Canadian Biography, it was never included for unknown reasons, and no definitive biography of him exists.

Academic offices
| Preceded by Elzéar-Alexandre Taschereau | Rector of Université Laval; 1871–1880 | Succeeded by Michel-Édouard Méthot |
| Preceded by Michel-Édouard Méthot | Rector of Université Laval; 1883–1886 | Succeeded by Michel-Édouard Méthot |
Professional and academic associations
| Preceded by Daniel Wilson | President of the Royal Society of Canada; 1886–1887 | Succeeded by George Lawson |
