= Michel-Édouard Méthot =

French-Canadian Roman Catholic churchman, educator and rector of Université Laval

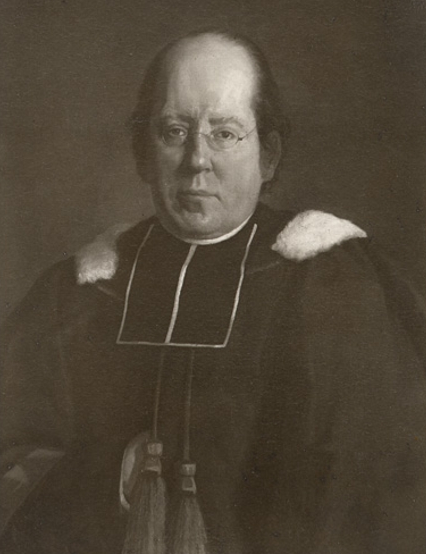
- Born: 28 July 1826; Sainte-Croix, Lower Canada
- Died: 6 February 1892 (aged 65); Quebec City, Quebec
- Known for: Rector of Université Laval

Michel-Édouard Méthot (28 July 1826 – 6 February 1892) was a French-Canadian Roman Catholic churchman, educator, and early rector of Université Laval.

== Biography ==
Méthot was born in the summer of 1826 in Sainte-Croix, Quebec, in what was then Lotbinière County. He was the son of farmers, Joseph Méthot and Marie-Xavier Desrochers. After his studies at the parish school, he went to the Petit Séminaire de Québec, to which he would remain attached for the rest of his life.

At the seminary he was a successful student, forming friendships with French priests Charles-Étienne Brasseur de Bourbourg and Pierre-Henri Bouchy, and entered the Grand Séminaire in 1846. His teaching and supervising duty at the Petit Séminaire, traditionally given to theological students, left him little time to study (only an hour a day, he confessed to his uncle). Due to Archbishop Joseph Signay's reservations (Signay noted Méthot's poor eyesight, which the latter sought treatment for), Méthot's tonsuring was delayed. He became a priest on 30 September 1849. Méthot went to teach rhetorics and literature at the Petit Séminaire and was noted as one of the best literature teachers there in the second half of the 19th century. In 1856, he was made prefect of studies.

In the 1860s, he took two years to travel and study in Europe. In 1860 he visited museums, high schools and churches, learning about different teaching practices. He also paid a visit to Bouchy. In 1866, he spent a year to further his theological studies at the Catholic University of Leuven, again taking notes of the inner working of the university and the teaching methods. Slated to become the Séminaire's superior, he wondered whether entering a religious might not be preferable. Upon his return, he became superior and rector of Université Laval (the positions were not separated until 1970).

Méthot "had an unusual face and head, invariably caricatured by the students in art class," although he was not considered ugly. He was not considered a great orator either, but his discussion was "always pleasant and full of wit," and his lectures were well planned and structured.

As a Rector, he served two full terms (1866–69, 1880–83) alternating with Elzéar-Alexandre Taschereau and Thomas-Étienne Hamel, and reluctantly accepted an interim term in 1886. From 1870 to 1873 he was director of the Grand Séminaire and was vice-rector of the University branch in Montreal (the future Université de Montréal) for two years starting in 1878. His service at the University was efficient and lacked outstanding achievement. However he and Hamel served during troubled times, having to react to both attacks from freemason-fearing elements in the clergy who saw the presence of freemason at Laval as worrying, and to the struggle of the Montreal ultramontanes under the leadership of Ignace Bourget seeking from Rome the establishment of an independent university in the city.

He was made a domestic prelate by Pope Leo XIII in 1886, but was forced to retire from his administrative positions the next year due to illness. He would then take on preaching and hearing confession in religious communities, also officiating in ceremonies in which sisters took the habit. He taught his last class in 1890, and died at the Hôpital Général de Québec in 1892. He is buried in the seminary's chapel.

Academic offices
Preceded by Elzéar-Alexandre Taschereau	Rector of Université Laval; 1866–1869	Succeeded by Elzéar-Alexandre Taschereau
Preceded by Thomas-Étienne Hamel	Rector of Université Laval; 1880–1883	Succeeded by Thomas-Étienne Hamel
Preceded by Thomas-Étienne Hamel	Rector of Université Laval; 1886–1887	Succeeded by Benjamin Pâquet
