= Denis Brière =

Canadian academic (c. 1945–2022)

Denis Brière (1945/1946 – July 8, 2022) was a Canadian forestry professor and academic administrator. He took office as Université Laval's 25th rector (president) on June 1, 2007. He ran unsuccessfully for the position in 2002. He was formerly dean of the faculty of forestry and geomatics at Université Laval in Quebec City, and held that office since 2000. He has also worked as an executive with James Bay Energy Corporation (Société d'énergie de la Baie-James), a consortium which built a series of hydro-electric dams near James Bay, Kruger Inc., a Canadian pulp and paper company, and Groupe Comact, a manufacturer of wood processing equipment.

== Awards ==
In 1994, he was named forestry engineer of the year by the Ordre des ingénieurs forestiers du Québec, the professional body for foresters in Quebec.
