= Louis-Jacques Casault =

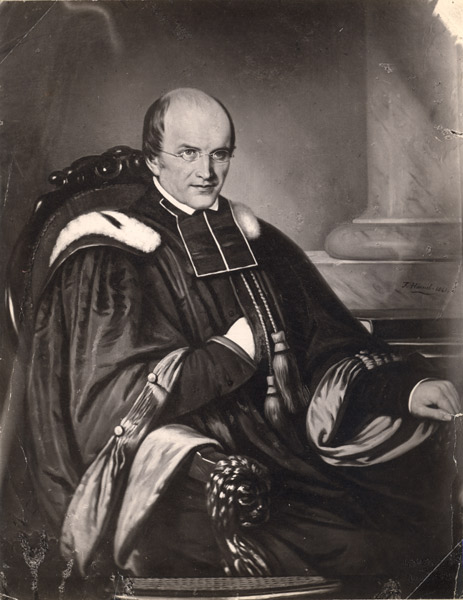
Louis-Jacques Casault by Théophile Hamel

Louis-Jacques Casault (17 July 1808 – 5 May 1862) was a Canadian priest, academic, superior of the Séminaire de Québec, and rector of Université Laval.

Born in Saint-Thomas-de-Montmagny, Lower Canada, the son of Louis Casault and Françoise Blais, Casault studied at the Petit Séminaire de Québec before being ordained a Roman Catholic priest in 1831. In 1834, he started teaching at the Séminaire de Québec. He was assigned to teach physics which he taught until 1854. In 1851, he was appointed superior of the Séminaire de Québec. Casault helped to form the Université Laval and was its first rector from 1852 to 1860. He was succeeded by Elzéar-Alexandre Taschereau.

Academic offices
New institution	Rector of Université Laval; 1852–1860	Succeeded by Elzéar-Alexandre Taschereau
