= Joseph-Clovis-Kemner Laflamme =

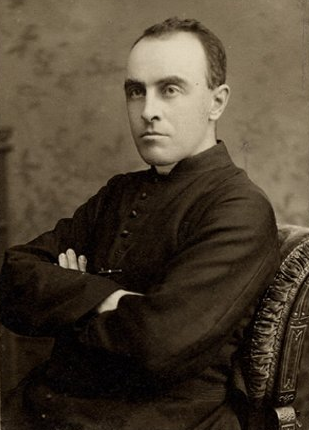
- Born: September 19, 1849; Saint-Anselme, Lower Canada
- Died: July 6, 1910 (aged 60); Quebec City, Quebec
- Occupations: Roman Catholic priest, educator, scientist, and writer

Joseph-Clovis-Kemner Laflamme (September 19, 1849 – July 6, 1910) was a Canadian Roman Catholic priest, academic, and writer.

Born in Saint-Anselme, Lower Canada, the son of David Kemner dit Laflamme and Josephte Jamme, Laflamme received a Bachelor of Arts degree in 1868 from the Petit Séminaire de Québec. He was ordained a priest in 1872 and received a Doctor of Theology degree in 1873 from the Grand Séminaire de Québec. In 1870, he became an instructor in natural history at the Petit Séminaire. In 1875, he started teaching physics at the Université Laval and was appointed chair of mineralogy and geology in the faculty of arts. He also taught geology, mineralogy, and botany. In 1881, he published a textbook, Éléments de minéralogie et de géologie. From 1891 to 1909, he was dean of the faculty of arts.

He was president of the Royal Society of Canada from 1891 to 1892. He was a member of the Société géologique de France, the Société Française de Physique, the Société Scientifique de Bruxelles, and the Geological Society of America. In 1898, he was made a chevalier of the Légion d'honneur.

Academic offices
Preceded by Benjamin Pâquet	Rector of Université Laval; 1893–1899	Succeeded by Olivier-Elzéar Mathieu
Preceded by Olivier-Elzéar Mathieu	Rector of Université Laval; 1908–1909	Succeeded by Amédée-Edmond Gosselin
Professional and academic associations
Preceded by George Monro Grant	President of the Royal Society of Canada; 1891–1892	Succeeded by John George Bourinot
