= Elzéar-Alexandre Taschereau =

First Canadian Catholic cardinal

His Eminence Elzéar-Alexandre Taschereau
- Archbishop of Quebec
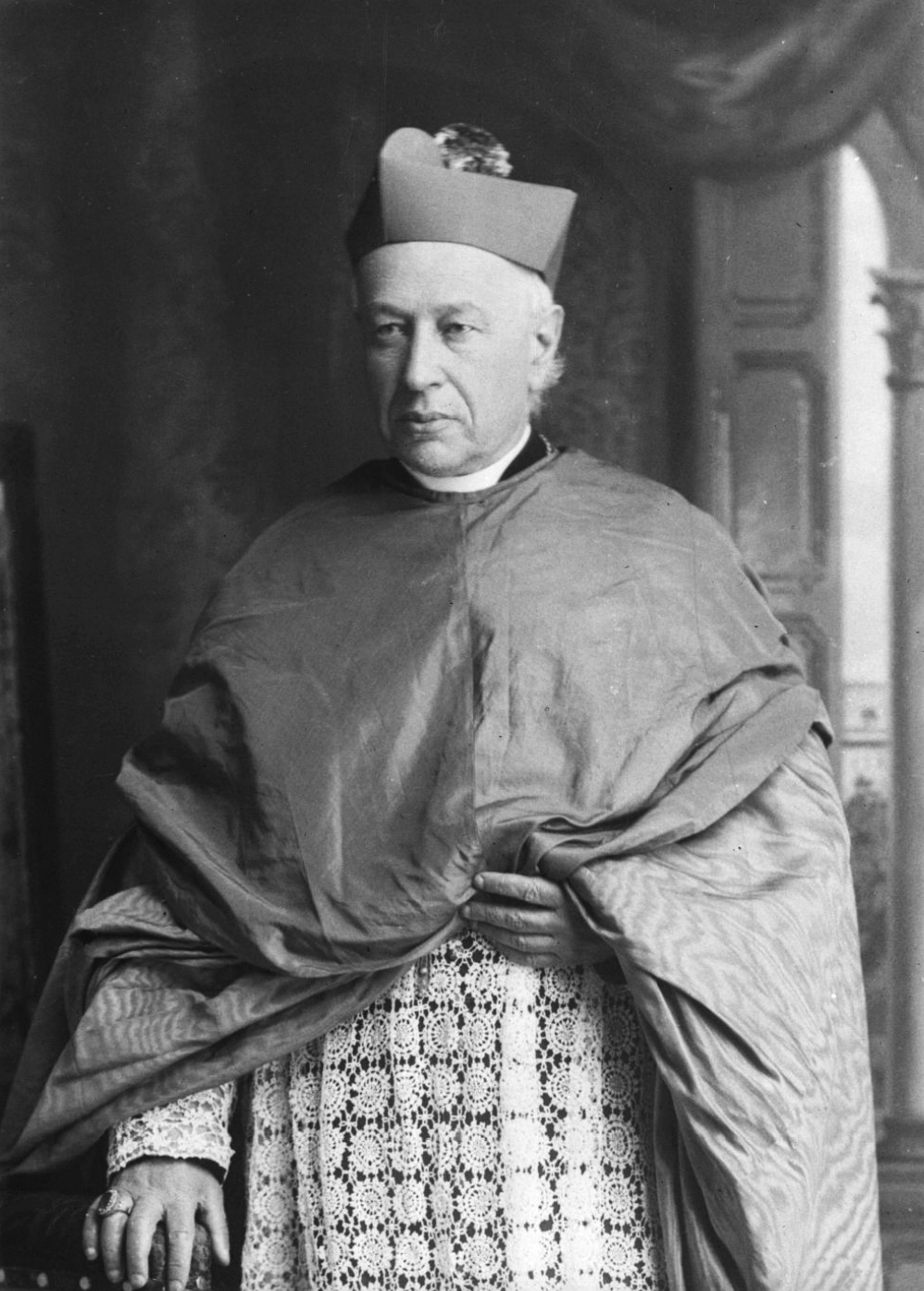
- The cardinal pictured in 1886.
- Church: Roman Catholic Church
- Archdiocese: Quebec
- See: Quebec
- Appointed: 24 December 1870
- Installed: 19 March 1871
- Term ended: 12 April 1898
- Predecessor: Charles-François Baillargeon
- Successor: Louis-Nazaire Bégin
- Other post: Cardinal-Priest of Santa Maria della Vittoria (1887-98)

Orders
- Ordination: 10 September 1842 by Pierre-Flavien Turgeon
- Consecration: 19 March 1871 by John Joseph Lynch
- Created cardinal: 7 June 1886 by Pope Leo XIII
- Rank: Cardinal-Priest

Personal details
- Born: Elzéar-Alexandre Taschereau; 17 February 1820 Sainte-Marie-de-la-Beauce, Lower Canada
- Died: 12 April 1898 (aged 78) Quebec, Canada
- Buried: Cathedral-Basilica of Notre-Dame de Québec
- Parents: Jean-Thomas Taschereau; Marie Panet
- Education: Pontifical Roman Athenaeum Saint Apollinare
- Motto: In fide spe et caritate certandum
- Coat of arms

Elzéar-Alexandre Taschereau (French pronunciation: [ɛlzeaʁ alɛksɑ̃dʁ taʃʁo]; February 17, 1820 – April 12, 1898) was a Canadian Cardinal of the Roman Catholic Church. He served as Archbishop of Quebec from 1871 until his death in 1898. The first Canadian cardinal, he was elevated to the College of Cardinals by Pope Leo XIII in 1886.

== Biography ==
One of seven children, Elzéar-Alexandre Taschereau was born in Sainte-Marie-de-la-Beauce, Quebec, to Jean-Thomas Taschereau and Marie Panet. His father was a judge of the Court of King's Bench of Quebec, and his mother was the daughter of Jean-Antoine Panet, the first Speaker of the Legislative Assembly of Lower Canada. His older brother, Jean-Thomas, was later a Puisne Justice of the Supreme Court. His great-uncle was Bernard-Claude Panet, who also served as Archbishop of Quebec (1825–1833).

Taschereau studied at the Seminary of Quebec from 1828 to 1836, and then travelled for a year to Great Britain, the Low Countries, France, and Italy. While in Rome, he received the tonsure on May 20, 1837, and his friendship with Dom Prosper Guéranger, O.S.B., led him to seriously consider joining the Benedictines. Instead he continued his studies and was ordained a priest for the Archdiocese of Quebec on 10 September 1842.

As a young priest, Taschereau was involved in providing care to the Irish immigrants to Quebec fleeing the Great Famine. Due to the terrible conditions on the ships bringing the immigrants, typhus was rampant. Taschereau described one ship, the Agnes, as "the most plague-ridden ship of all and in danger of losing everyone on board." In the end, the Agnes had a death rate of forty per cent.

Taschereau obtained a doctorate in canon law in Rome in 1856 and had a dual career in teaching and pastoral care. He served as a teacher, director, prefect of studies and superior at the Seminary in which he had studied for ordination. He helped found the Université Laval in 1852 and served as its second rector (1860–66, 1869–71). He remained on the staff of the Seminary until his consecration as the Archbishop of Quebec on 19 March 1871.

At the urging of the Canadian government and many of the faithful, in 1886 Pope Leo XIII made Taschereau Cardinal-Priest of Santa Maria della Vittoria, Rome, the first from Canada. He was not able to stay in his post as archbishop for long, however, as illness forced him to turn over his workload to Mgr. Louis-Nazaire Bégin, who was named as his Coadjutor Archbishop in 1892. Cardinal Taschereau died in Quebec City on April 12, 1898.

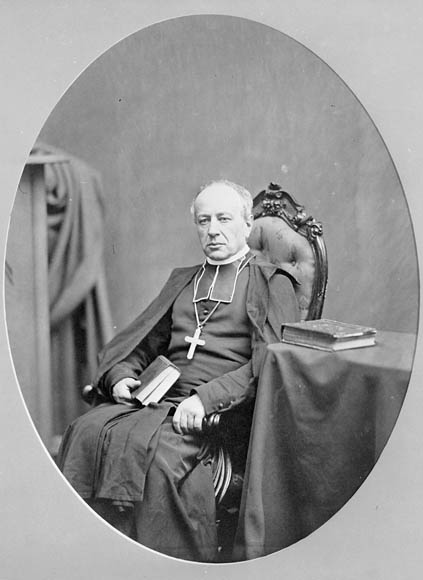
In 1871

Catholic Church titles
Preceded by Charles-François Baillargeon	Archbishop of Quebec; 1871–1898	Succeeded by Louis-Nazaire Bégin
Academic offices
Preceded by Louis-Jacques Casault	Rector of Université Laval; 1860–1865	Succeeded by Michel-Édouard Méthot
Preceded by Michel-Édouard Méthot	Rector of Université Laval; 1869–1871	Succeeded by Thomas-Étienne Hamel
