= François Pelletier =

French magician

François Pelletier was a French illusionist, famed in his time for his use of magnets as an entertainment basis for his act. His reputation was such that he was invited to perform at the court of Maria Theresa of Austria at Schönbrunn Palace in 1769. His act inspired the construction of the purported chess-playing automaton The Turk, following observation of the performance by the Hungarian Wolfgang von Kempelen.
