= Jean-Guy Paquet =

Canadian businessman and academic

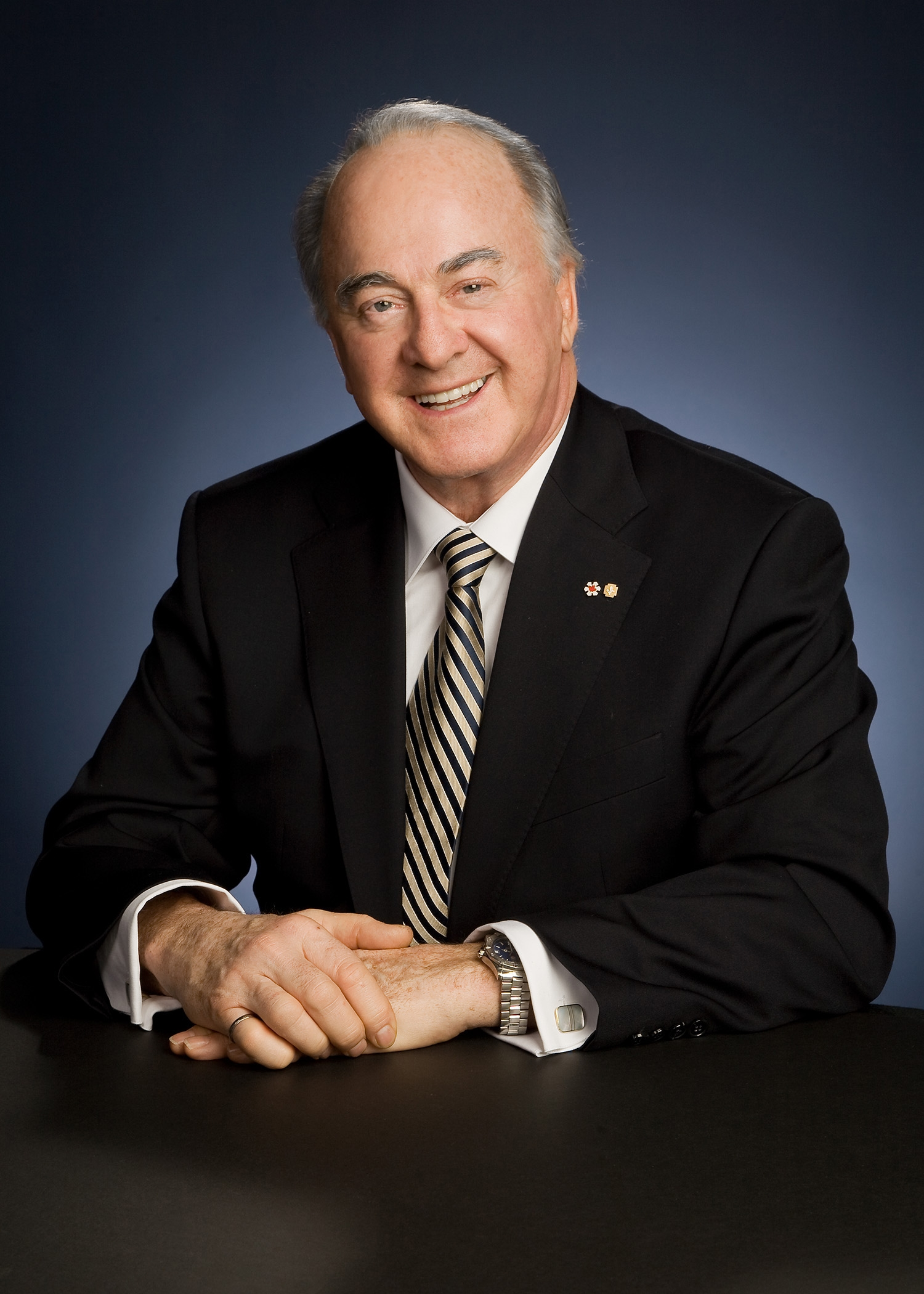
- Jean-Guy Paquet
- Born: January 5, 1938 (age 88); Montmagny, Quebec
- Awards: Order of Canada; National Order of Quebec

Jean-Guy Paquet, CC GOQ FRSC (born January 5, 1938) is a Canadian scientist, businessman, and former rector of Université Laval.

Born in Montmagny, Quebec, he studied at the University Laval, where he obtained a bachelor's degree in engineering physics in 1959. The next year, Paquet obtained a master's in aeronautics at the École nationale supérieure de l’aéronautique. Returning to the University Laval, he received a Doctor of Electrical Engineering in 1963. From 1967 to 1969, he was the head of the electrical engineering department at University Laval. From 1969 to 1972, he was a vice-rector of University Laval and he was rector from 1977 to 1987. He was the youngest-ever president of a Canadian university and the second engineer to become rector at University Laval.

After leaving University Laval, he became Executive Vice President of The Laurentian Mutual Insurance Company from 1987 to 1988 and was President from 1988 to 1994. Since 1994, he has been President and CEO of the National Optics Institute.

== Honours ==
- In 1978, he was made a Fellow of the Royal Society of Canada.
- In 1982, he was awarded an honorary Doctor of Sciences from McGill University.
- In 1983, he was awarded an honorary Doctor of Law from York University.
- In 1984, he was made an Officer of the Order of Canada.
- In 1992, he was made an Officer of the National Order of Quebec.
- In 1994, he was promoted to Companion of the Order of Canada.
- In 2000, he was awarded the Quebec government's Prix Armand-Frappier.
- In 2005, he was promoted to Grand Officer of the National Order of Quebec.
- he was elected as Fellow of the Canadian Academy of Engineering.
