= Saint-Nicolas, Quebec =

District of Quebec, Canada

Coordinates: 46°42′N 71°24′W

Saint-Nicolas
- Borough
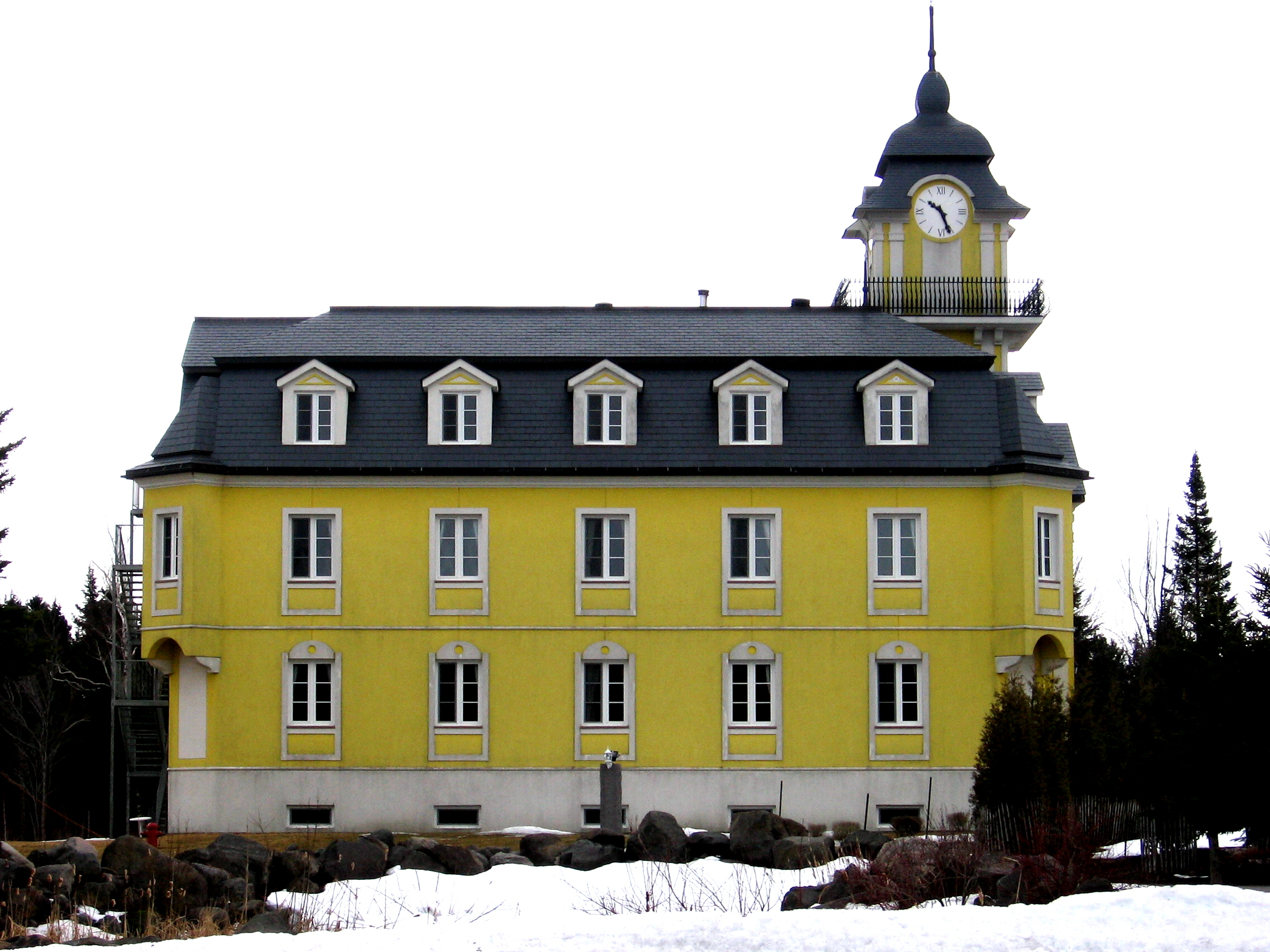
- Interactive map of Saint-Nicolas
- Country: Canada
- Province: Québec
- MRC: Lévis
- Established: 1694

Government
  - Type: Borough

Area
  - Total: 95.09 km^{2} (36.71 sq mi)

Population (2006)^{[1]}
  - Total: 18,437
- Time zone: UTC-5 (EST)
  - Summer (DST): UTC-4 (EDT)

Saint-Nicolas (French pronunciation: [sɛ̃ nikɔla]) is a district within Les Chutes-de-la-Chaudière-Ouest borough of the city of Lévis, Quebec, Canada on the St. Lawrence River. Prior to 2002, it was an independent municipality.

== History ==
The history of Saint-Nicolas goes back to 1694. It is one of the oldest parishes in Canada. Its heritage is a testimony to its long history.

The city was named in honour of Saint Nicolas de Myre.

In 2002, following many merges with other municipalities, Saint-Nicolas was one of nine cities merged with Lévis.

== Statistics ==
According to the Canada 2006 Census:

- Population: 18,437
- % Change (2001–2006): +10.8
- Dwellings: 7,024
- Area (km^{2}): 95.09 km^{2}
- Density (persons per km^{2}): 193.9
