= Camille Roy (literary critic) =

Canadian academic (1870–1943)

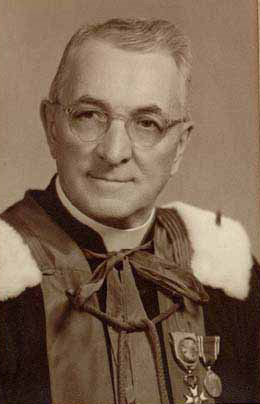
- Born: October 22, 1870; Berthier-en-Bas (Berthier-sur-Mer), Quebec
- Died: June 24, 1943 (aged 72); Quebec City, Quebec
- Occupations: priest, professor, literary critic

Camille Roy (October 22, 1870 – June 24, 1943) was a Canadian priest and literary critic. He wrote extensively about the development of French-Canadian literature, and its importance in the promotion of French language and culture and of Christian ideals.

== Early life and education ==
Roy was born in Berthier-en-Bas (Berthier-sur-Mer), Quebec. He studied at the Petit Séminaire of Quebec and the Grand Séminaire de Québec and was ordained a priest in 1896.

== Career ==
Roy wrote a number of articles and essays of literary criticism, beginning in 1902, many of which were published in newspapers and magazines. A collection of his essays, Essais sur la littérature canadienne was published in 1907. In 1912 he edited and published a collection of stories about Canadian life.

In 1909 Roy wrote Nos origines littéraires, in which he discussed the influence of French literature on Canadian writers.

Roy wrote extensively about approaches to the study of literature, including Manuel d'histoire de la littérature canadienne-française in 1920.

Roy was rector of Université Laval for four terms: 1922 to 1924, 1929, 1932 to 1938, and 1940 to 1943. Through these years he lectured and wrote about French-Canadian culture and its expression through literature. He was awarded the Lorne Pierce Medal in 1929.

== Works ==
- L'Université Laval Et Les Fêtes Du Cinquantenaire, (1903)
- Essais Sur La Littérature Canadienne, (1907)
- Nos Origines Littéraires, (1909)
- Propos Canadiens, (1912)
- Les Fêtes Du Troisième Centenaire De Québec, (1911)
- Nouveaux Essais Sur La Littérature Canadienne, (1914)
- Tableau De L'Histoire De La Littérature Canadienne-Française, (1915)
- Manuel De L'Histoire De La Littérature Canadienne-Française, (1918)
- La Critique Littéraire Au XIXe Siècle, De Mme De Staël..., (1918)
- Érables En Fleurs, (1923)
- Monseigneur De Laval, (1923)
- A L'Ombre Des Érables, (1924)
- Études Et Croquis, (1928)
- Les Leçons De Notre Histoire, (1929)
- Histoire De La Littérature Canadienne, (1930)
- Regards Sur Les Lettres, (1931)
- Poètes De Chez Nous, (1934)
- Historiens De Chez Nous, (1935)
- Romanciers De Chez Nous, (1935)
- Nos Problèmes D'Enseignement, (1935)
- Pour Conserver Notre Héritage Français, (1937)
- Pour Former Des Hommes Nouveaux, (1941)

Professional and academic associations
Preceded by Arthur Henry Reginald Buller	President of the Royal Society of Canada; 1928–1929	Succeeded by Arthur Stewart Eve
