= University of Toronto Arts and Science =

University of Toronto Arts and Science most often refers to:

- University of Toronto Faculty of Arts and Science, based on the St. George campus in downtown Toronto

The term may also refer to the University of Toronto's other academic divisions providing Arts and Science education:

- University of Toronto Mississauga, in Mississauga
- University of Toronto Scarborough, in Scarborough, Toronto
