= Woodsworth College, Toronto =

Constituent college of the University of Toronto

Woodsworth College
- Constituent college
- University of Toronto
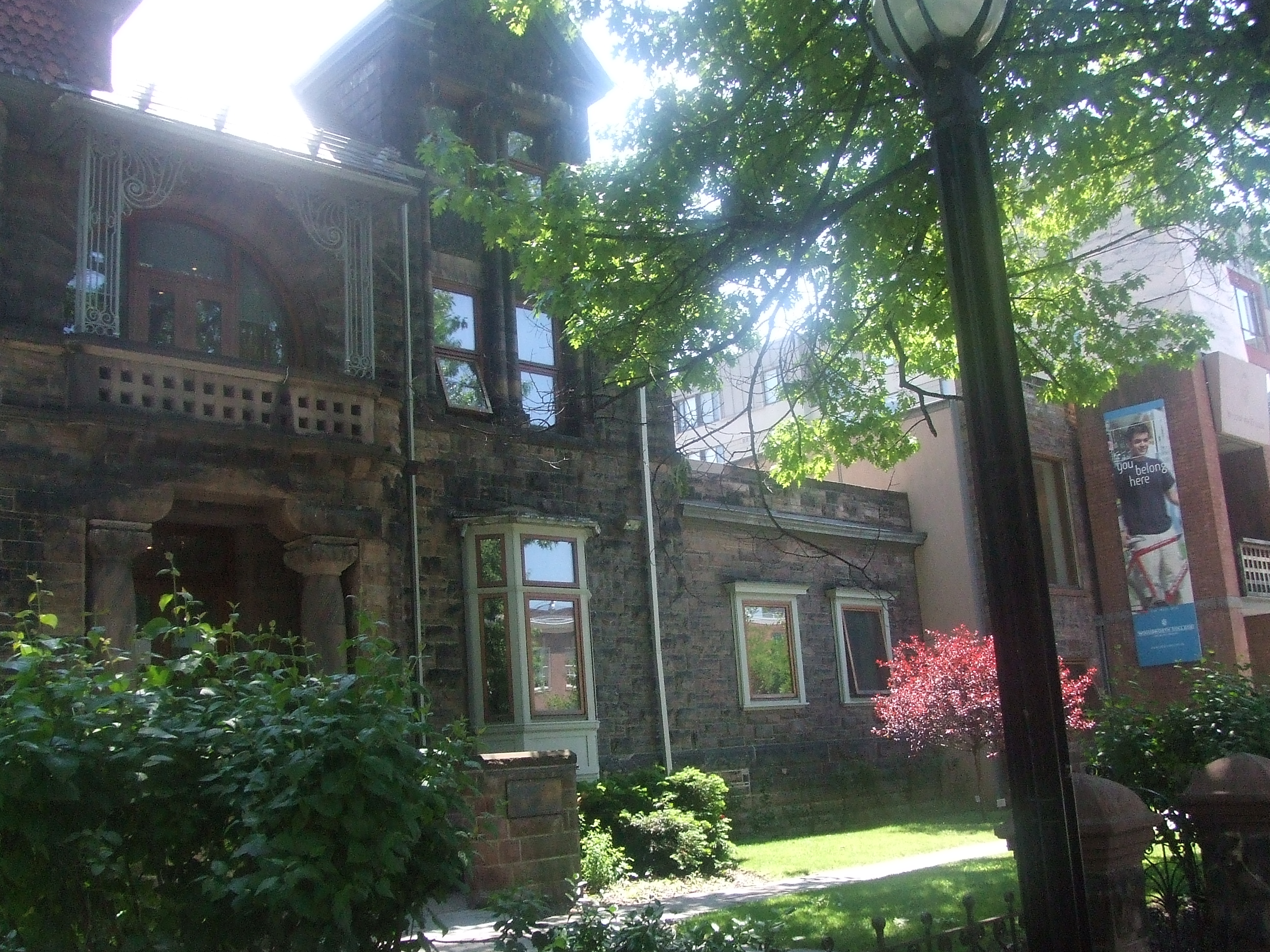

- Arms: Or a quarter Gules overall an open book within three wreathes of laurel all counterchanged.
- Location: 119 St. George Street, Toronto, Ontario, Canada
- Coordinates: 43°39′59″N 79°23′57″W
- Motto: Propositi tenax (Latin)
- Motto in English: "Firm of purpose"
- Established: 1974; 52 years ago
- Named for: J. S. Woodsworth
- Principal: Carol Chin
- Undergraduates: 6000
- Mascot: Wolf
- Website: wdw.utoronto.ca

Woodsworth College is a constituent college of the University of Toronto, located on its St. George campus in Toronto, Ontario, Canada. It is among the largest of the seven colleges in the Faculty of Arts and Science. It is also the newest of the colleges at the University of Toronto, created in 1974. Woodsworth College's arms and badge were registered with the Canadian Heraldic Authority on October 15, 2006.

The college was founded to serve part-time students exclusively, specifically adults pursuing studies in Arts and Sciences, and transfer students. Since 1999, Woodsworth has welcomed direct entry students. Woodsworth College is home to approximately 5300 students.

The college is named after politician and clergyman James Shaver Woodsworth (1874–1942).

== Academics ==
=== Academic programs ===
These programs combine courses from a number of different academic departments in the Faculty of Arts and Science.

- Millie Rotman Shime Academic Bridging Program and the Diploma to Degree Program
- Digital Humanities (Minor program)
- Summer Abroad
- International Summer Program
- Woodsworth One

==== Certificate programs ====
This program is for students who have already completed an undergraduate degree.

- TESOL (Teaching English to Speakers of Other Languages)

=== Visiting student program ===
Woodsworth oversees the Visiting Student Program in the Faculty of Arts and Science. This program allows students from other North American universities to come to the University of Toronto and complete credits towards degrees at their home institution.

=== International student exchange ===
In 1972, Woodsworth was administering the Summer Program to Siena, Italy. It was the first destination, followed in 1997 by Hong Kong.

Woodsworth College's Summer Abroad Program sends approximately 900 students to 16 destinations worldwide. In 2020, the destinations were: Australia, Central Europe, China, Ecuador, England, France, Georgia, Germany, Greece, Ireland, Italy, Portugal, Peru, South Africa, South Korea, Spain and there was a Science Abroad option. In 2021, the program was run virtually. Plans are underway for travel again in the summer of 2022.

== Student life ==
=== Student residence ===
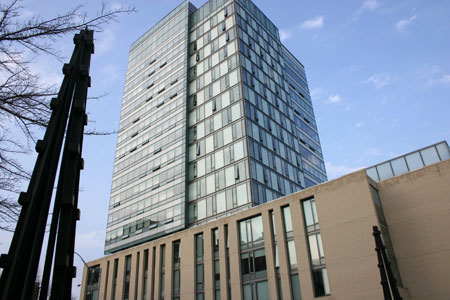
Woodsworth College Residence Building

Woodsworth Residence opened in 2004 and was designed by the architectural firm Architects Alliance. The residence, located at 321 Bloor Street West, towers over the Perly-Rae gates at the northern entrance of the St. George campus. The building is a 17-storey glass tower housing 371 students.

Prior to the construction in 2004 of the Woodsworth College undergraduate residence, the site at 321 Bloor Street was occupied by the Graduate Student Residence, also known as the St. George Apartments. The four-storey U-shaped residence, built in 1926, was designed by the firm of Paisley & Marani and was in the City of Toronto's Inventory of Heritage Properties. In 2000, a new residence was built for graduate students at the Graduate House on Harbord St.

Woodsworth College Residence has a student council (Woodsworth Residence Council) composed of students who live in the residence including floor/house reps.

Woodsworth College Residence is a mixed-use building. While the upper floors are dedicated to student housing, the ground floor accommodates Rotman Commerce's Academic Services. The ground floor also contains a commercial lease facing Bloor Street West. Lecture halls and classrooms occupy the basement of the building, which are used by the Rotman School of Management.

=== Students' association ===
The Woodsworth College Students' Association (WCSA) is the representative body of students at the college.

The association's board consists of its president, six vice-presidents, and twenty-four directors.

WCSA organizes events such as orientation (Orientation Week) for first-year students, weekly WCSA Wednesdays, the annual Red Party along with the year-end Woodsworth Gala (Formal). It also provides a great number of services and activities throughout the year.

The office of the WCSA is located at: WW 103, 119 St. George Street, Toronto, Ontario, Canada.
