= Frank Dawson Adams =

Canadian geologist (1859–1942)

Frank Dawson Adams FRS FRSC
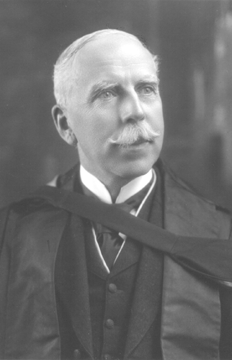
- Adams, c. 1930
- Born: September 17, 1859; Montreal, Canada East
- Died: December 26, 1942 (aged 83); Montreal, Quebec, Canada
- Awards: Lyell Medal (1906); Flavelle Medal (1937); Wollaston Medal (1939)

Frank Dawson Adams FRS FRSC (September 17, 1859 – December 26, 1942) was a Canadian geologist.

== Early life and education ==
Frank Dawson Adams was born into a prosperous, middle-class family in Montreal, Canada East.

Adams attended the High School of Montreal (a private school founded in 1843 and closely associated with McGill University after 1852). As a pupil there, Adams received a classical education, and his knowledge of Latin was valuable later in life in his historical studies.

At the age of sixteen he entered the Applied Science Program at McGill University, where he studied geology with John William Dawson (Principal of McGill since 1852) and Bernard Harrington (who had set up the Applied Science program). In unpublished notes he described Harrington as "the professor who influenced me chiefly."

He graduated with first class honors in Applied Science in 1878, then spent a year at the Yale Scientific School, where he studied German, French, and mineralogy. It was there that he met George Wessel Hawes (1848-1882) a pioneer American petrologist, who had worked with Harry Rosenbusch in Germany. He also met a fellow-student, Andrew Cowper Lawson, and in 1888 they published a joint paper on their investigation of the mineral scapolite. Returning to Montreal, he was appointed Assistant Chemist at the Geological Survey of Canada (GSC), and the following year (when the GSC moved to Ottawa), Assistant Chemist and Petrographer. He received a leave of absence to spend at least part of two years in Heidelberg, studying with Harry Rosenbusch, who by that time was the acknowledged master of microscopic petrography of igneous rocks. Rosenbusch attracted students from many different countries. While Adams was in Heidelberg he met G.H. Williams and J.S. Diller, both of whom later became leading American petrologists, as well as Victor Goldschmidt and (Carl) Alfred Osann (1859–1923), who became famous geochemists in Europe.

In 1883, Adams published the first work in Canada that made full use of the petrographic microscope, as well as a paper indicating that he had already begun the field work north of Montreal, that later became the basis of his doctorate at Heidelberg. He received a master's degree from McGill in 1884, and his Ph.D. from Heidelberg University in 1892. His doctoral studies on the Morin anorthosite showed that these rocks were not metamorphosed sediments, as thought previously, but were igneous rocks that had been intruded into Grenville sediments and later metamorphosed in the Grenville orogeny.

== Career ==
In 1889 Adams was appointed Lecturer in Geology at McGill University. He was appointed Logan Professor of Geology after the retirement of John William Dawson in 1892 and held this position until his own retirement in 1924. Though he was working full-time at McGill, he continued to spend summers in the field, financed by the GSC. In 1891 he began working on the Grenville of eastern Ontario, and by the following year had started to work on the Haliburton, Ontario area. His work there, carried out after 1896 with Alfred Barlow of the GSC, was published as a GSC Memoir in 1908, and became a classic of Canadian geology. The rocks, which included unusual alkaline rocks, were not merely mapped, but studied in detail using petrographic and chemical methods, and firm conclusions were drawn about their petrogenesis, all of which was unusual for a GSC Memoir at that time.

At the same time, Adams was also studying the peculiar petrological characteristics of a group of alkaline intrusions of much later geological age (now known to be Early Cretaceous), called by him the "Monteregian Hills." This work would be continued by his students, notably Joseph Austin Bancroft (1882-1957), who succeeded Adams as Logan Professor at McGill. Inspired by his observations on the flow of metamorphosed limestones in the Grenville, Adams began a series of pioneer experimental studies of the physical properties of rocks at high pressures and temperatures, carried out in collaboration with John Thomas Nicholson, Professor of Engineering at McGill. This was well before comparable work was carried out in Germany or the United States. Though the experimental apparatus was primitive compared with that later developed at Harvard University and the Geophysical Laboratory in Washington, D.C., Adams' work was highly regarded by the newly founded Carnegie Institution for Science, which supported him financially, and attempted to persuade him to move to the Institution.

Adams remained at McGill, where he served as the Dean of the Faculty of Applied Science and then as Vice-Principal to the University. He served as President of the International Geological Congress held in Toronto in 1913, and was President of the Geological Society of America in 1917. He received many honors during his career, first becoming a Fellow of the Royal Society of Canada in 1896, a Fellow of the Royal Society (of Great Britain) in 1907, an International member of the American Philosophical Society in 1916, a Foreign Honorary Member of the American Academy of Arts and Sciences in 1917, an International Member of the United States National Academy of Sciences in 1920, and awarded the Flavelle Medal, which is given for outstanding contributions to biological science, in 1937. The Frank Dawson Adams Building at McGill University is named in his honor. A plaque in his honor was erected on the Redpath Museum on the McGill campus in 1950.

He retired from McGill in 1924, and began to travel widely, collecting books on the history of geology, as well as rocks and minerals for McGill. He published several papers on the geology of Ceylon and also on the history of geology, culminating in his book Birth and Development of the Geological Sciences (1938). It became a classic and was reprinted by Dover Publications in 1954. He left his rare book collection (1581 monographs) to McGill university.

Professional and academic associations
Preceded by William Dawson LeSueur	President of the Royal Society of Canada; 1913–1914	Succeeded by Adolphe-Basile Routhier
