= Arthur Philemon Coleman =

Canadian geologist

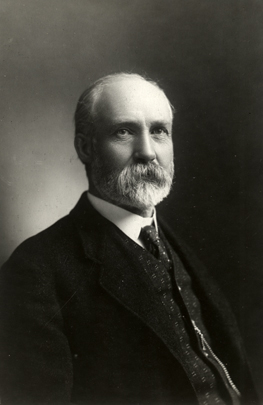

4th Dean of the University of Toronto Faculty of Arts
- In office 1919 – 1922
- Preceded by: Alfred Baker
- Succeeded by: Alfred Tennyson DeLeury

Personal details
- Born: April 4, 1852 Lachute, Canada East
- Died: February 26, 1939 (aged 86)
- Scientific career
- Education: Victoria College, Toronto; University of Breslau
- Awards: Murchison Medal (1910); Flavelle Medal (1929); Penrose Medal (1936); Fellow of the Royal Society
- Fields: Geology
- Workplaces: University of Toronto

Arthur Philemon Coleman (April 4, 1852 – February 26, 1939) was a Canadian geologist and academic.

== Biography ==
Born in Lachute, Canada East, the son of Francis Coleman (an ordained minister) and Emmeline Maria Adams, he received his Bachelor of Arts in 1876 and Master of Arts in 1880 from Victoria College in Cobourg, Ontario. He received a Ph.D. at the University of Breslau in 1881.

Coleman joined the department of geology and natural history at Victoria College in 1882 as a professor. From 1891 to 1901, he was a professor of geology at the School of Practical Science in Toronto. From 1893 to 1909, he was a geologist at the Bureau of Mines of the Government of Ontario. From 1901 to 1922, he was a professor of geology at the University of Toronto and was dean of the Faculty of Arts from 1919 to 1922. In 1913, he was appointed Director of the Museum of Geology at the Royal Ontario Museum and tasked with bringing together Geology with four other museums: Archaeology, Mineralogy, Palaeontology and Zoology. From 1931 to 1934, he was a geologist with the Department of Mines of the Government of Ontario.

In 1886, Coleman was the first to describe one of the most important (both scientifically and historically) and largest meteorites to ever fall in Canada. This 145 kg iron–nickel meteorite, likely the differentiated centre of a failed protoplanet, is called the Manitou Asinîy, Creator's Stone, or Iron Creek meteorite.

In 1898, Coleman led a field expedition with the intent of surveying resources, along with the Geologist George Mercer Dawson and the famed anarchist, Peter Kropotkin. Kropotkin gave his credit to Coleman, writing he was "well acquainted with the mining region of Central Canada."

In 1907, Coleman inferred a "lower Huronian ice age" from analysis of a geological formation near Lake Huron.

Coleman was elected a fellow of the Royal Society of Canada in 1900 and was its president in 1921. He was awarded the Murchison Medal of the Geological Society of London in 1910 and in 1928 was awarded the Royal Society of Canada's Flavelle Medal. In 1902, he was elected President of the Royal Canadian Institute and in 1910, he was made a fellow of the Royal Society. In 1915, he was President of the Geological Society of America. In 1929, he was appointed Honorary Vice-President of the Royal Canadian Geographical Society.

He was author of:

- Reports on the Economic Geology of Ontario (1903)
- Lake Ojibway; Last of the Great Glacial Lakes (1909)
- The Canadian Rockies: New and Old Trails (1911)
- Ice Ages, Recent and Ancient (1926), and was co-author of Elementary Geology (1922).
- The Last Million Years (1941) Edited by George F. Kay
- A meteorite from the northwest (1886)

He achieved the first ascent of Castle Mountain in 1884, and in 1907, he was the first white man to attempt to climb Mount Robson. He made a total of eight exploratory trips to the Canadian Rockies, wholly four of them looking for the mythical giant mountains Hooker and Brown.

Coleman was awarded the Penrose Medal of the Geological Society of America in 1936.

His younger half-sister was poet Helena Coleman; the two shared a home in Toronto for much of their adult lives.

== Legacy ==
Mount Coleman and Coleman Glacier in Banff National Park are named in his honour.

Lake Coleman, a lake with a higher water level, in the same basin as Lake Ontario, is named in Coleman's memory. The lake, like Lake Iroquois and Lake Scarborough, is a product of the melting and drainage of the Laurentide ice sheet.

== Bibliography ==
- The Arthur P. Coleman Collection at the Victoria University Library at the University of Toronto
- "Arthur Philemon Coleman, 1852-1939". Internet Archive.
- A.P. Coleman: Geologist, Explorer (1852 – 1939) – Science, Art & Discovery, a Virtual Exhibit

Professional and academic associations
Preceded by Robert F. Ruttan	President of the Royal Society of Canada; 1920–1921	Succeeded by Duncan C. Scott
