= RMS Empress of Britain (1905) =

Canadian ocean liner from 1906 to 1930

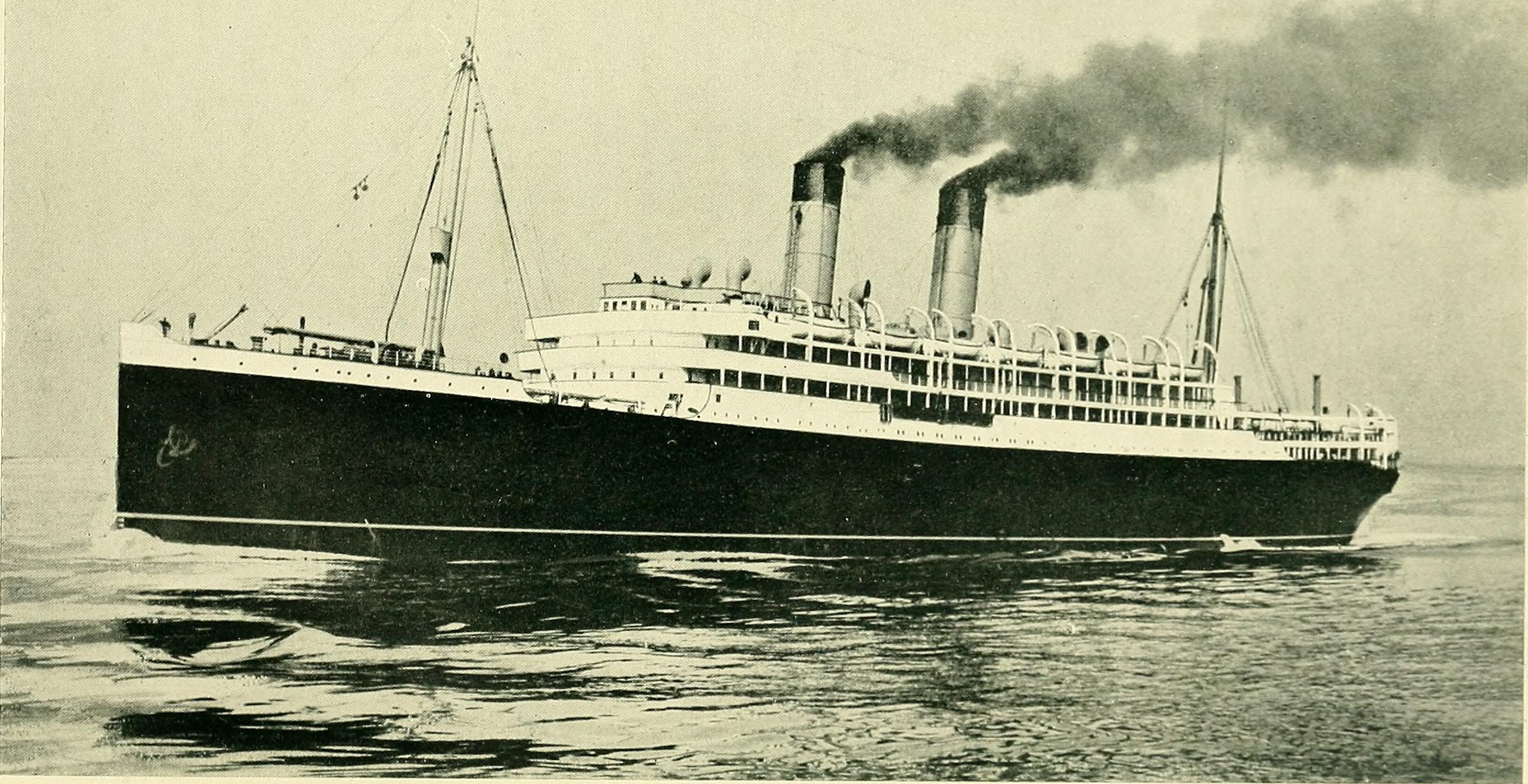
- RMS Empress of Britain, in Every boy's book of railways and steamships (1911)

History
- Name: 1906–1923: RMS Empress of Britain; 1924–1930: Montroyal
- Owner: 1906–1930: Canadian Pacific Railway
- Port of registry: (United Kingdom) Liverpool
- Builder: Fairfield Shipbuilding and Engineering Company, Govan
- Yard number: 442
- Way number: 2021
- Launched: 11 November 1905
- Maiden voyage: 5 May 1906
- In service: 1906
- Out of service: 1930
- Identification: Wireless code letters: MPB
- Fate: Scrapped in 1930
- Notes: Sister ship to Empress of Ireland, which sunk in 1914 and killed 1000+ people

General characteristics
- Type: Ocean liner
- Tonnage: 14,189 GRT, 8,024 NRT
- Length: 570 ft (174 m) oa; 550 ft (168 m) pp
- Beam: 65 ft 7.2 in (19.995 m)
- Depth: 40 ft (12 m)
- Propulsion: Quadruple-expansion steam engines
- Speed: 18 knots (33 km/h)
- Capacity: 310 1st class passengers; 470 2nd class; up to 730 steerage passengers

RMS Empress of Britain was a transatlantic ocean liner built by the Fairfield Shipbuilding and Engineering Company at Govan on the Clyde in Scotland in 1905–1906 (Note: The disambiguation date used in this article's title is not the year in which the hull is launched, but rather the year of the ship's sea trial or maiden voyage.) for Canadian Pacific Steamship (CP). This ship – the first of three CP ships to be named Empress of Britain (Note: The second of three ships named Empress of Britain (1931) was built for CP; and the third Empress of Britain (1955) was also built for CP some years later.) – regularly traversed the transatlantic crossing between Canada and Europe until 1923, with the exception of the war years. Empress of Britain was the sister ship of RMS Empress of Ireland, which was lost in 1914.

== History ==
Fairfield's built Empress of Britain in its yard at Govan, Glasgow, Scotland. She was launched on 11 November 1905.

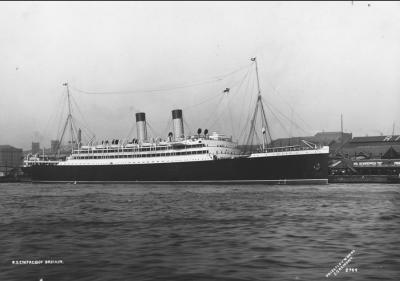
Empress of Britain at Liverpool in 1905

The 14,189 GRT ship had an overall length of 570 feet (170 m) and her beam was 65.7 feet (20.0 m). The ship had two funnels, two masts, twin propellers and an average speed of 18 knots (33 km/h). The ocean liner provided accommodation for 310 first-class passengers and for 470 second-class passengers. There was also room for 730 third-class passengers.

Empress of Britain left Liverpool on 5 May 1906 on her maiden voyage to Quebec. Thereafter, she was scheduled to sail regularly back and forth on the transatlantic route. In the early years of wireless telegraphy, Empress of Britain's wireless code letters were "MPB."

On her second voyage, Empress of Britain made the west-bound trip from Moville, Ireland, to Rimouski, Canada, in five days, 21 hours, 17 minutes – a new record, which was a credit to her Captain, James Anderson Murray, and to her shipbuilders. Both Empress of Britain and her sister ship, Empress of Ireland were the fastest ships making the transatlantic run to Canadian ports at the time. In 1914, Empress of Ireland sank in the Saint Lawrence River with great loss of life.

Much of what would have been construed as ordinary, even unremarkable during this period was an inextricable part of the ship's history. In the conventional course of transatlantic traffic, the ship was sometimes held in quarantine if a communicative disease was discovered amongst the passengers. Similarly, it would have been expected, for example, that the ship would notify authorities in Halifax that one passenger had died from pneumonia en route to Canada from Europe.

Less than two weeks after disaster struck the RMS Titanic in the North Atlantic, Empress of Britain also struck an iceberg on 26 April 1912. The berg was spotted at 10:00 AM while the ship in a dense fog and slowed down. The Empress managed to avoid a serious collision but did strike a glancing blow.

On 27 July 1912, Empress of Britain rammed and sank the British collier Helvetia in fog off Cape Magdelene in the estuary of the St Lawrence River, the same river where her sister met a similar fate.

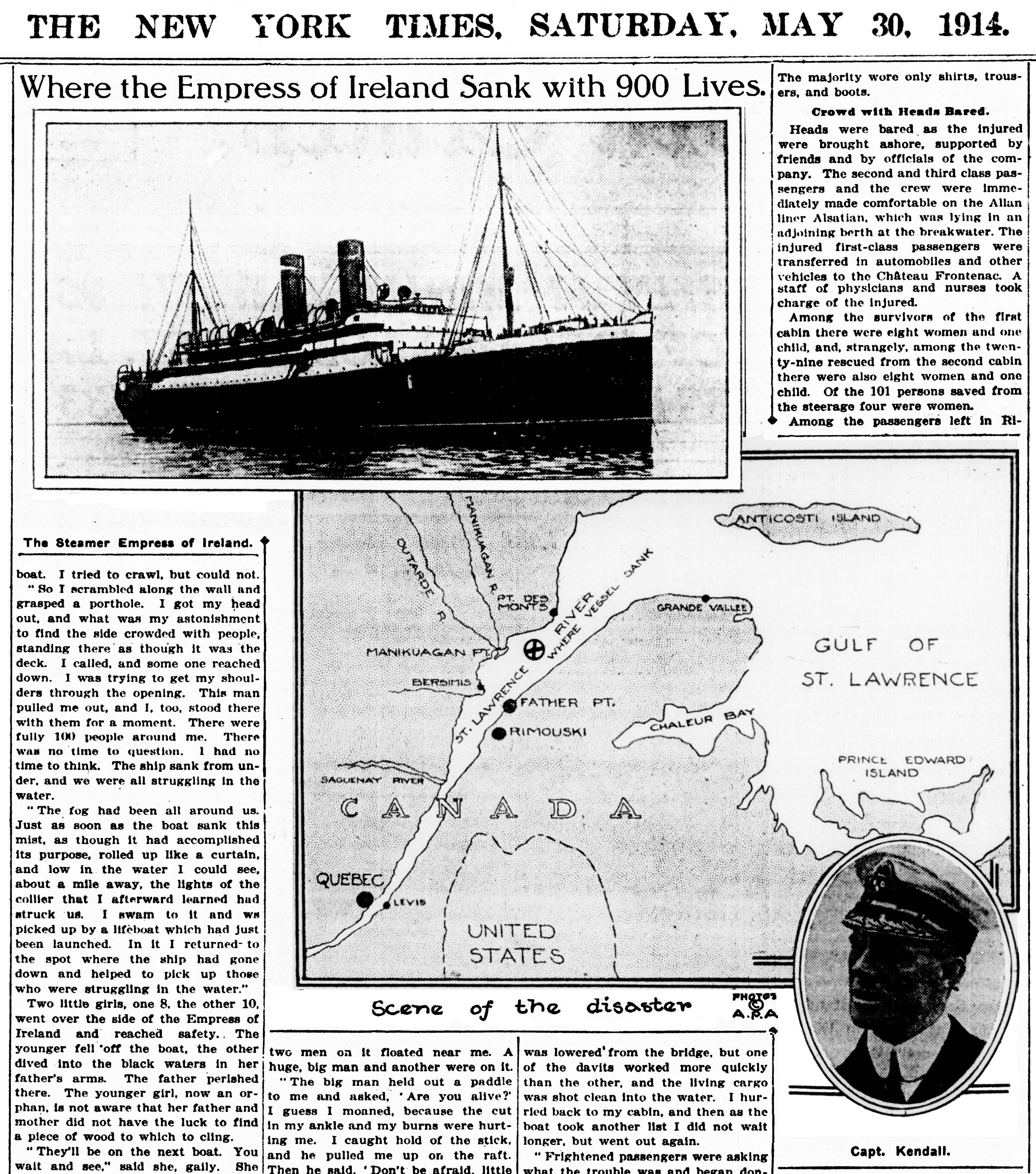
Map showing where the RMS Empress of Ireland sank, sister ship of RMS Empress of Britain.

== First World War ==
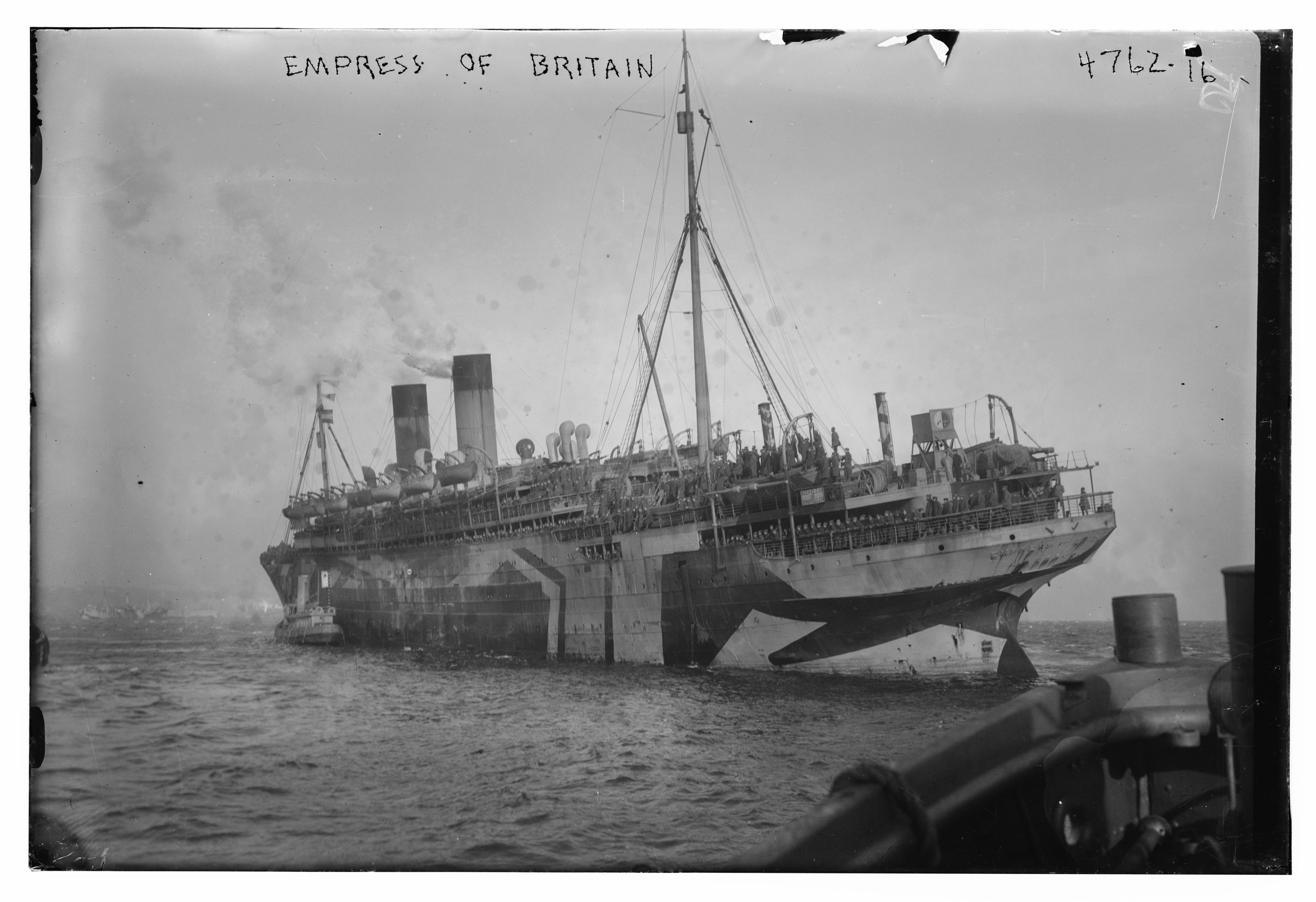
Empress of Britain as a troop ship in the First World War

In 1914 the Admiralty requisitioned her and she was refitted as an armed merchant cruiser. She joined Admiral Archibald Peile Stoddart's squadron in the South Atlantic. She later patrolled between Cape Finisterre and the Cape Verde Islands.

In May 1915, she was recommissioned as a troop transport and carried more than 110,000 troops to the Dardanelles, Egypt and India. She also carried Canadian and US expeditionary forces across the North Atlantic.

On 12 December 1915, while passing through the Straits of Gibraltar, she collided with and sank a Greek steamer. It was the night of 13 December Empress of Britain collided with an empty French troop ship, Djuradjura, returning from Salonika, the French troop ship was cut in half by the engine room and two French stokers were killed. 62 crew were rescued.

== Post-war years ==
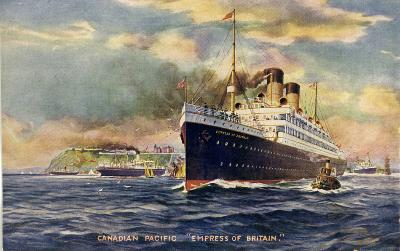
Empress of Britain in a 1920s postcard

The end of the war in Europe meant a change for Empress of Britain. Reports of the arrival and departure of the Empress were published in The New York Times in December 1918, but the Liverpool – New York route was not long-lasting. In March 1919, she resumed the Liverpool-St.John, New Brunswick service for one round-trip voyage. On 4 May 1919 she returned CEF (Canadian Expeditionary Force) troops from England to Canada. The ship was then returned to Fairfield's yard on the Clyde, where she was converted from coal to oil fuel and the passenger accommodations were modernised. On 9 January 1920, she returned to service on the Liverpool – Quebec crossings.

In October 1922, Empress of Britain begin sailing on the Southampton – Cherbourg – Quebec route.

== Montroyal ==
In 1924, the ship was renamed Montroyal. Her accommodations were altered to carry 600 cabin passengers and 800 third-class passengers. On 19 April 1924, she was returned to service sailing on the Liverpool – Quebec route.

In 1926, the accommodations were again altered to carry cabin, tourist and third class passengers. She completed eight round-trip voyages in that year. In 1927, the ship was transferred to the Antwerp – Southampton – Cherbourg – Quebec route.

Montroyal began her final voyage from Antwerp on 7 September 1929. Including this last voyage, she had completed 190 round-trip crossings of the North Atlantic.

On 17 June 1930, the ship was sold to the Stavanger Shipbreaking Co. (Stavanger, Norway) and was scrapped. The owner of the Sola Strand Hotel in Sola, Norway bought the lounge from the shipbreakers and incorporated it into his hotel as the Montroyal Ballroom. The ship's woodwork is still a feature of this building as the Montroyal Lounge for Sunday buffets and events, including the original fireplace, lead glass ceiling and windows.

== See also ==
- CP Ships
- List of ocean liners
- Ships built at Govan
