= William Frederick King =

Canadian surveyor, astronomer, and civil servant

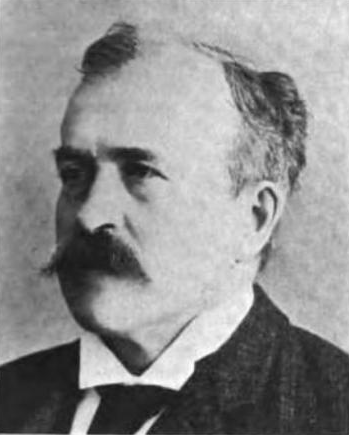
- Born: February 19, 1854; Stowmarket, England
- Died: April 23, 1916 (aged 62); Ottawa, Ontario, Canada
- Known for: surveyor and astronomer

William Frederick King CMG FRSC (February 19, 1854 – April 23, 1916) was a Canadian surveyor, astronomer, and civil servant.

Born in Stowmarket, England, the son of William King and Ellen Archer, King emigrated to Port Hope, Canada West with his family when he was eight. In 1869, he started studying at the University of Toronto. He left in 1872 to work as a sub-assistant astronomer for the international boundary survey in Western Canada. He returned to the University of Toronto and received a Bachelor of Arts degree in mathematics in 1874. In 1875, he was working as an assistant in the Canadian survey of lands in the northwest.

After becoming a dominion land surveyor and dominion topographical surveyor in 1876, he started working as an astronomical assistant for the federal Department of the Interior. He became a permanent civil servant as inspector of surveys in 1881, chief inspector in 1886, and Canada's first chief astronomer in 1890. In 1905, he was appointed founding director of the Dominion Observatory.

In 1908, he was made a Companion of the Order of St Michael and St George and a Fellow of the Royal Society of Canada. He served as president of the Royal Society of Canada from 1911 to 1912. In 1909, he was made a Fellow of the Royal Astronomical Society of Canada.

Professional and academic associations
Preceded by Robert Ramsay Wright	President of the Royal Society of Canada; 1911–1912	Succeeded by William Dawson LeSueur
