= RMS Empress of Ireland =

Canadian ocean liner that sank in 1914

Coordinates: 48°37.5′N 68°24.5′W

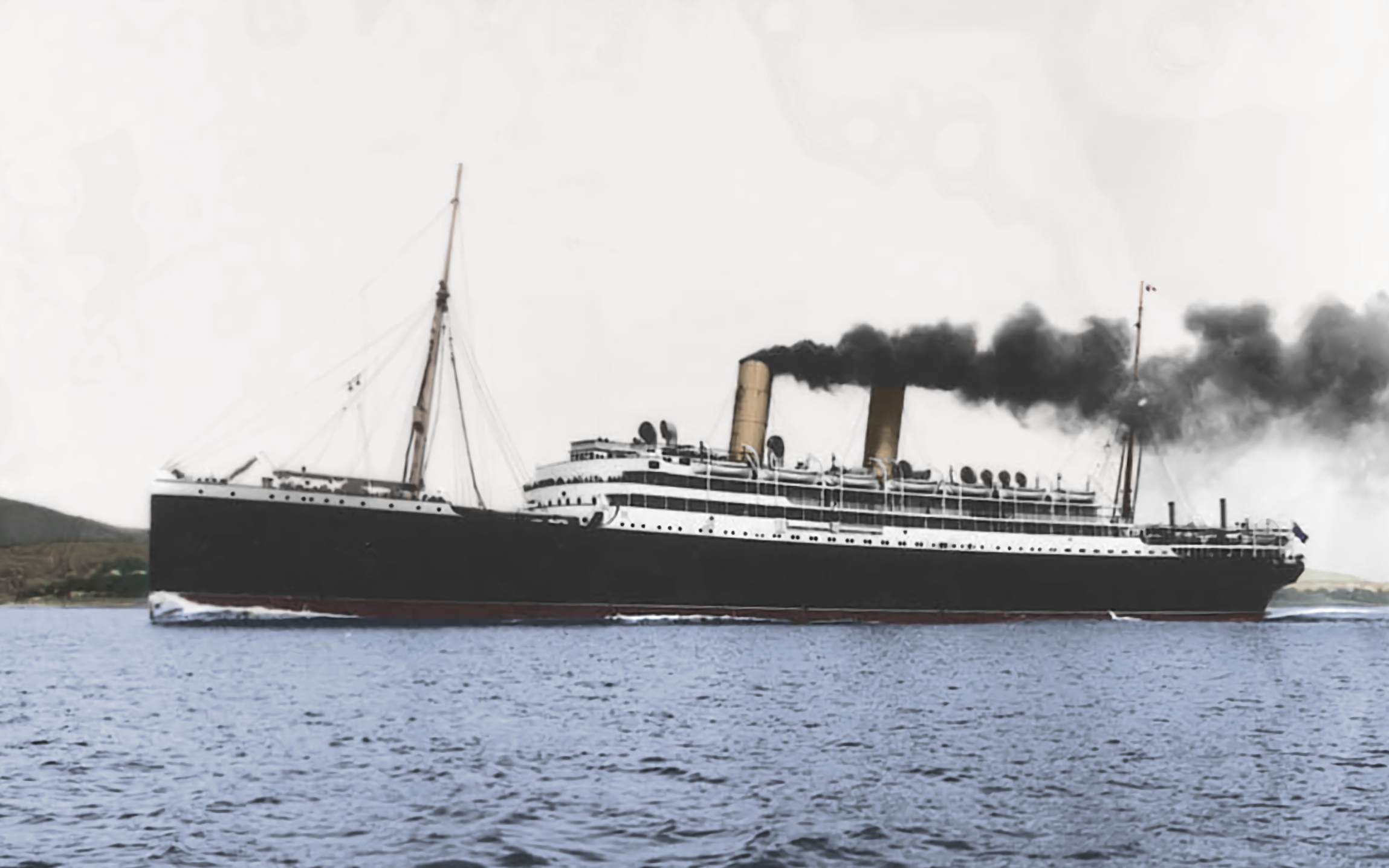
- Colourised photo of Empress of Ireland

History
- Name: RMS Empress of Ireland
- Owner: Canadian Pacific Railway
- Operator: Canadian Pacific SS Co
- Port of registry: Liverpool
- Builder: Fairfield Shipbuilding & Eng Co, Govan
- Yard number: 443
- Laid down: 10 April 1905
- Launched: 27 January 1906
- Christened: 27 January 1906
- Maiden voyage: 29 June 1906
- In service: 27 January 1906
- Out of service: 29 May 1914
- Identification: UK official number 123972; Call sign MPL
- Fate: Sank after collision with SS Storstad on 29 May 1914

General characteristics
- Type: Ocean liner
- Tonnage: 14,191 GRT; 8,028 NRT
- Length: 570 ft (170 m) oa; 548.9 ft (167.3 m) pp
- Beam: 65.7 ft (20.0 m)
- Depth: 36.7 ft (11.2 m)
- Decks: 4 steel decks
- Installed power: 3,168 NHP
- Propulsion: 2 × Quadruple-expansion steam engines; 2 × Screw propellers
- Speed: 18 knots (33 km/h; 21 mph)
- Capacity: 1,542 passengers in 1906; 310 First Class; 468 Second Class; 494 Third Class; 270 Steerage
- Crew: 373 in 1906

National Historic Site of Canada
- Designated: 2009

RMS Empress of Ireland was a British-built ocean liner that sank near the mouth of the Saint Lawrence River in Canada following a collision in thick fog with the Norwegian collier Storstad in the early hours of 29 May 1914, en route to Liverpool. Although the ship was equipped with watertight compartments and, in the aftermath of the Titanic disaster two years earlier, carried more than enough lifeboats for all aboard, she foundered in only 14 minutes. Of the 1,477 people on board, 1,012 died, making it the worst peacetime maritime disaster in Canadian history. (Note: The Halifax Explosion, which claimed more lives than the sinking of Empress of Ireland, was not caused by military action. However, it cannot be considered a "peacetime maritime disaster" because it took place during World War I and involved munitions destined for the Western Front.)

Fairfield Shipbuilding and Engineering built Empress of Ireland and her sister ship, Empress of Britain, at Govan on the Clyde in Scotland. The liners were commissioned by Canadian Pacific Steamships or CPR for the North Atlantic route between Liverpool and Quebec City. The transcontinental CPR and its fleet of ocean liners constituted the company's self-proclaimed "World's Greatest Transportation System". Empress of Ireland had just begun her 96th voyage when she was lost.

The wreck of Empress of Ireland lies in 22 fathoms (40 m; 132 ft) of water, making it accessible to advanced divers. Many artifacts from the wreckage have been retrieved, some of which are on display in the Empress of Ireland Pavilion at the Site historique maritime de la Pointe-au-Père in Rimouski, Quebec, and at the Canadian Museum of Immigration at Pier 21 in Halifax, Nova Scotia. The Canadian government has passed legislation to protect the site.

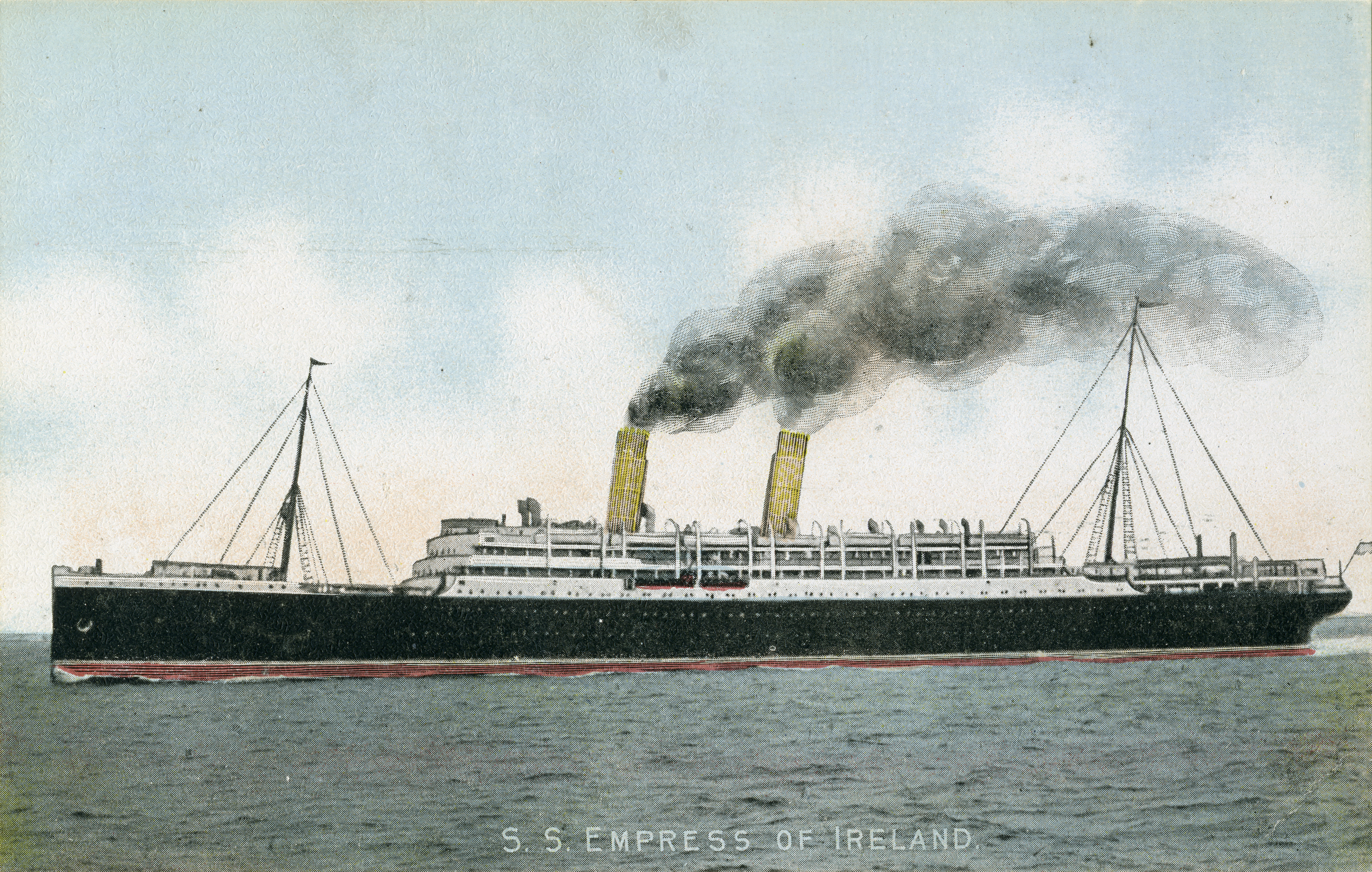
RMS Empress of Ireland

== Background ==
Empress of Ireland was the second of a pair of ocean liners ordered by Canadian Pacific Steamships during their early years in operation on the North Atlantic. In 1903, Canadian Pacific officially entered the market for trans-Atlantic passenger travel between the United Kingdom and Canada. In February of that year, they had purchased Elder Dempster & Co, through which they obtained three ships from Elder's subsidiary, the Beaver Line. These ships were Lake Champlain, Lake Erie and Lake Manitoba, with Lake Champlain being the first to sail on the company's established route between Liverpool, England and Montreal, Quebec, the following April. The line proved to be successful on the North Atlantic trade, as in that first year, thirty-three westbound crossings were completed by those three ships, on which a combined total of 23,400 passengers travelled in third class, most of them emigrants bound for Canada.

== Description and construction ==
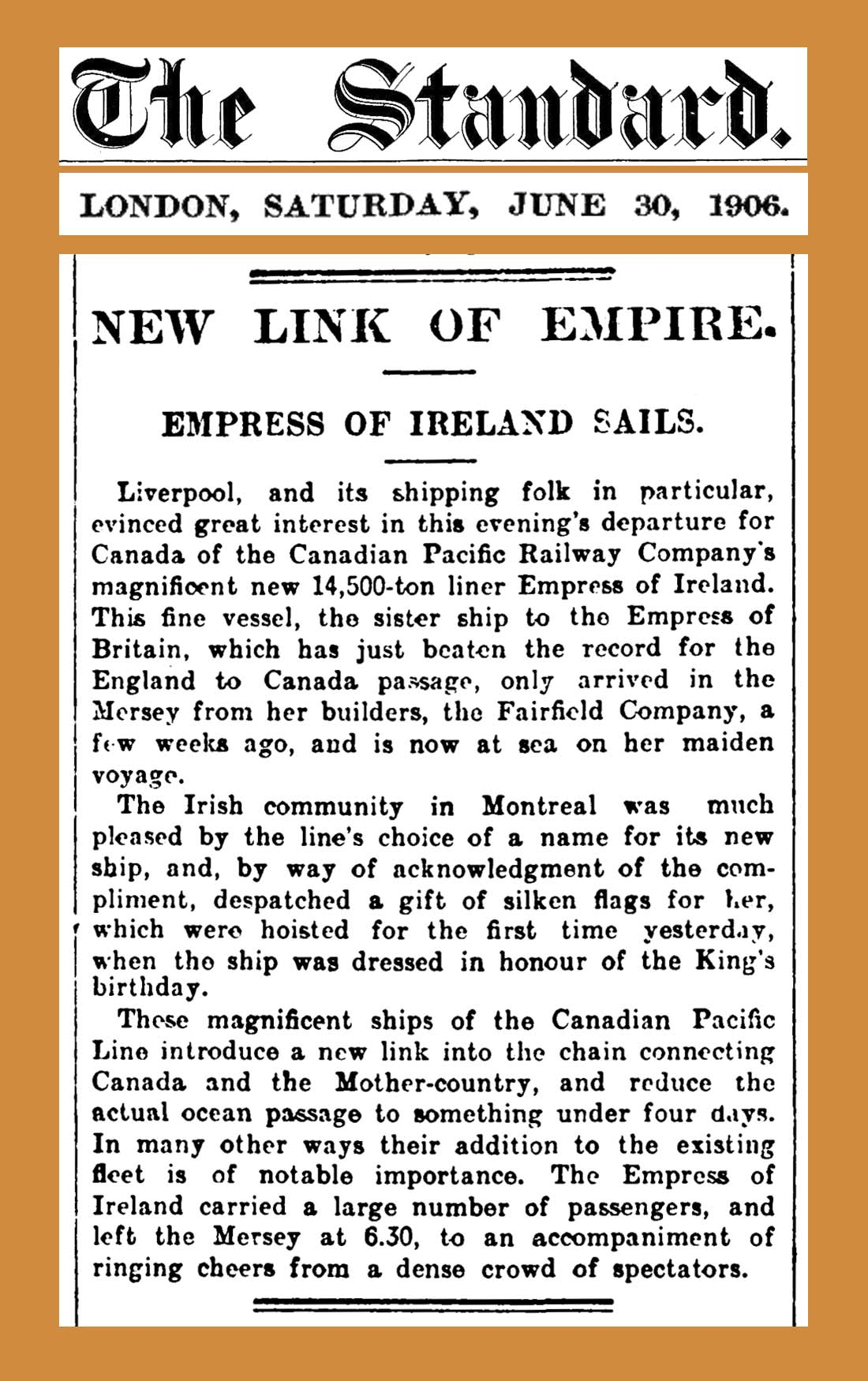
Announcements of the liner's maiden voyage touted the passenger capacity and the speed of Empress of Ireland and her near-identical sister ship, Empress of Britain, achieving passage "between Canada and the Mother Country" in less than four days.

In early 1904 work commenced at Fairfield Shipbuilding and Engineering in Glasgow, Scotland. The liners were designed by Francis Elgar and were specified to be twin screw liners with service speeds of 18 knots (33 km/h; 21 mph). Both were of identical appearance, with two funnels and two masts, with equal passenger capacity of just over 1,500. In the early planning stages, their intended names were to have been Empress of Germany and Empress of Austria, but were later changed respectively to Empress of Britain and Empress of Ireland, following the implementation of a policy that any future Canadian Pacific ship named in the Empress format would be respectively named after a dependency or colony of the British Empire.

The ship's keel was laid down on 10 April 1905 for hull number 443 at Fairfield's berth number 4 next to her sister ship, Empress of Britain, which was being built. Empress of Ireland's length was 570 ft (170 m) overall and 548.9 ft (167.3 m) between perpendiculars. The beam was 65.7 ft (20.0 m) and her depth was 36.7 ft (11.2 m). Empress of Ireland had twin four-bladed propellers, each driven by a quadruple-expansion steam engine. Between them the two engines were rated at 3,168 NHP and gave her a service speed of 18 knots (33 km/h; 21 mph). She had twin funnels and two masts.

Empress of Ireland's safety features included ten watertight bulkheads which divided the hull into eleven compartments which could be sealed off through the means of closing twenty-four watertight doors. All eleven bulkheads extended from the double bottom up to directly beneath the Shelter Deck, equivalent to three decks above the waterline. By design theory, the vessels could remain afloat with up to two adjacent compartments open to the sea. However, what would prove to be the fatal flaw in her design in 1914 was that, unlike aboard Titanic where the watertight doors could be closed by the means of a switch on the ship's bridge, the watertight doors aboard Empress of Ireland were required to be closed manually. Also, in the wake of the Titanic disaster, Empress of Ireland, like many other liners, had her lifesaving equipment updated. When she first entered service in 1906, she had been equipped with standard wooden lifeboats, which in 1912 were replaced with sixteen steel lifeboats mounted in conventional radial davits, under which were stored another twenty-six wooden collapsible lifeboats, all of which combined had a capacity of 1,686 people, 280 more than the ship was licensed to carry.

Empress of Ireland was launched on 27 January 1906. With her original configuration she required a crew of 373, and had berths for 1,542 passengers in four classes on seven decks.

=== Accommodation ===
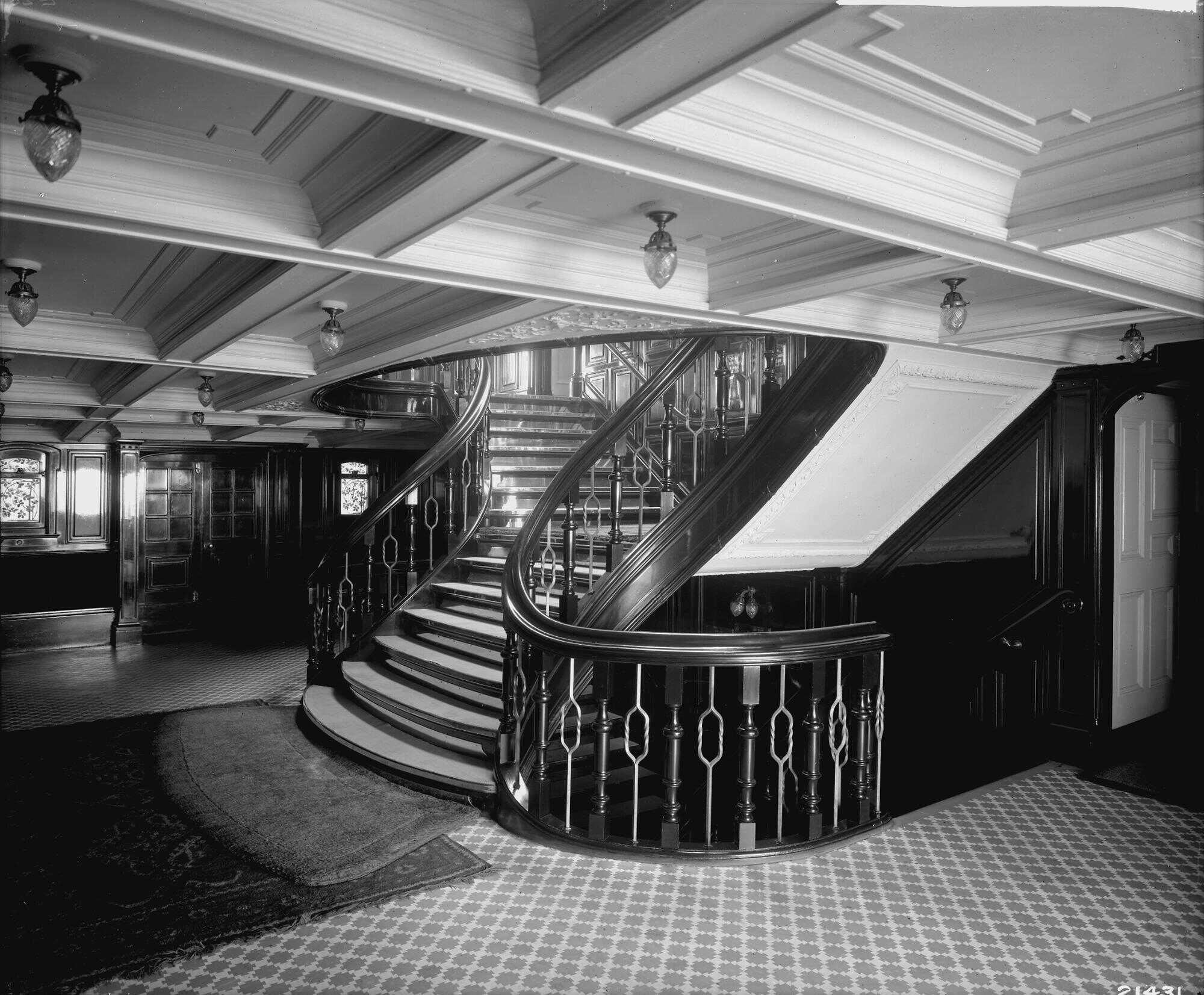
First class entrance on the lower promenade deck. The stairs go up to the first class music room and down to the first class dining saloon.

Empress of Ireland's First Class accommodation, located amidships on the upper and lower promenade and shelter decks, could accommodate 310 passengers when fully booked. Their accommodation included access to the open boat deck and two enclosed promenade decks which wrapped the full exterior of the upper and lower promenade decks. Located on the upper promenade deck was the music room, with built-in sofas and a grand piano encircling one of the ship's most notable features, the glass dome over the first class dining room. Also on this deck was the top landing of the first class main staircase, which as similarly seen aboard Titanic, faced aft and extended down two decks to the entrance of the first class dining room. Located on the lower promenade deck was the First class library, situated at the forward end of the deck with windows overlooking the ship's bow. Amidships was the first class cafe, which was pierced by the two-story well above the first class dining room, while at the aft end of the deck was the first class smoke room. One deck below on the shelter deck was the elegant first class dining room, which could seat 224 passengers in one sitting. In addition, a separate dining room for up to thirty first class children was located at the forward end of the deck. Finally, scattered across all three decks were arrays of two- and four-berth cabins.

The second class accommodation, in the stern on the lower Promenade, shelter, upper and main decks, could accommodate 150 more passengers than in first class, with a designed capacity for 468 in second class when fully booked. They were allotted open deck space at the after end of the lower promenade deck, extending from the after end of the superstructure to beneath the docking bridge at the end of the stern, while one deck below on the shelter deck was located additional deck space sheltered by the deck above. Also on the shelter deck were the second class smoke room, located at the aft end of the deck and designed in a similar but simpler fashion as what was seen in first class, with built-in sofas lining the outer walls and an adjacent bar. At the forward end of the deck, beneath the aft mast was the second class entrance, with a staircase running down two decks to the main deck. Aft of the main landing was the second class social hall, laid out in a fashion similar to the smoke room and provided with a piano, while forward of the entrance was the second class dining room, large enough to seat 256 passengers at one serving. On the starboard side of the upper deck and in the three compartments aft of the engine room casing on the main deck were an array of two and four berth cabins, designed to be interchangeable to both first class and third class. According to the ship's deck plans, cabins for 134 passengers on the upper deck were designed to be converted to first class cabins if needed, while the cabins for 234 passengers on the main deck could simultaneously be converted to be used for third class passengers if needed.

As for emigrants and lower-class travellers, Empress of Ireland was designed with accommodations which symbolised the dramatic shift in immigrant travel on the North Atlantic commonly seen between the turn of the 20th Century and the outbreak of the First World War, that being a general layout which included both the 'old' and 'new' steerage. Combined, these provided accommodation for 764 passengers at the forward end of the ship. Passengers travelling in these two classes had some shared public areas, including access to the forward well deck on the shelter deck, as well as a large open space on the Upper Deck very similar to the open space later seen aboard Titanic. This open space, which spanned the full width of the ship and the length of two watertight compartments, included wooden benches lining the outer walls, and a large children's sand pit enclosed by a wooden fence. At the after end of this space were two smaller public rooms, side by side against the adjacent bulkhead. On the port side was the third class ladies' room, which included a piano, while across on the starboard side was the third class smoke room, complete with an adjacent bar. On the main and lower decks, the accommodations separated, with the 'new' steerage, more commonly referred to as third class, providing for 494 passengers, and the 'old' steerage providing for 270 passengers. Accommodation for Third class consisted of four sections of two, four and six berth cabins, three on the main deck and one on the lower deck, and defined by watertight bulkheads. Directly aft of the section on the main deck was the third class dining room, which was large enough to seat 300 passengers in one sitting. The old steerage consisted of three sections of open berths, one on the main deck and two on the lower deck, all forward of the third class sections. Each section consisted of two-tiered bunks, individual pantries and long wooden tables with benches.

== Career ==
Two months after Empress of Britain entered service, Empress of Ireland departed Liverpool for Quebec City on her maiden voyage on Thursday, 29 June 1906. The following morning she made port at Moville, a coastal town on the north coast of Ireland, to pick up a number of Irish immigrants before making for the open Atlantic. On her first trip across the Atlantic she carried 1,257 passengers, with 119 in First Class and 342 in Second Class, and Third Class being booked well past capacity with 796, which included a large number of small children and infants among them. Seen as a foreshadowing of Empress of Ireland's popularity with immigrants, Third Class was so heavily overbooked on her maiden voyage that at least 100 passengers who had booked passage aboard her had to be left behind in Liverpool to wait for the next ship.

On the afternoon of 6 July, Empress of Ireland arrived at the mouth of the Saint Lawrence River, calling at Pointe-au-Père to pick up a river pilot who would assist in guiding the ship down the final 300-kilometre stretch of the voyage to Quebec City. While off Rimouski, another small boat met Empress of Ireland to collect all Canadian-bound mail and drop off a group of people working to aid in preparing for the liner's arrival. These consisted of Canadian Pacific Railway (CPR) ticketing agents who would meet with all the passengers to arrange for their transportation by rail to their final destinations across Canada; Canadian immigration and customs officials who would inspect luggage and check passenger documents, and doctors to examine all passengers to check for any illnesses which would warrant quarantine at Grosse Isle, a process all but one of the ship's passengers passed through successfully. Empress of Ireland arrived in Quebec City early the following morning, where passengers disembarked and cargo was offloaded, and after a six-day turnaround she sailed on her first eastbound crossing back to Liverpool on 12 July.

Over the next eight years, Empress of Ireland completed the same process of transporting passengers and cargo between Britain and Canada, with alternating Canadian ports by season, terminating at Quebec City in May through October and at Halifax, Nova Scotia, and Saint John, New Brunswick, in November through April when the river was frozen over. By 1913 Empress of Ireland was equipped with wireless telegraphy, operating on the 300 and 600 metre wavelengths. Her call sign was MPL.

Empress of Ireland's final successful crossing ended when she arrived at Quebec City from Liverpool on 22 May 1914, by which time she had completed 95 successful round trips, and transported 119,262 passengers westbound to Canada and another 67,838 eastbound to Britain.

== Final crossing ==
Empress of Ireland departed Quebec City for Liverpool at 16:30 local time (EST) on 28 May 1914, manned by a crew of 420 and carrying 1,057 passengers, roughly two thirds of her total capacity. In first class, the list of passengers was relatively small, with only 87 booked passages. The small number did not, however, spare the inclusion of some rather notable figures from both sides of the Atlantic.

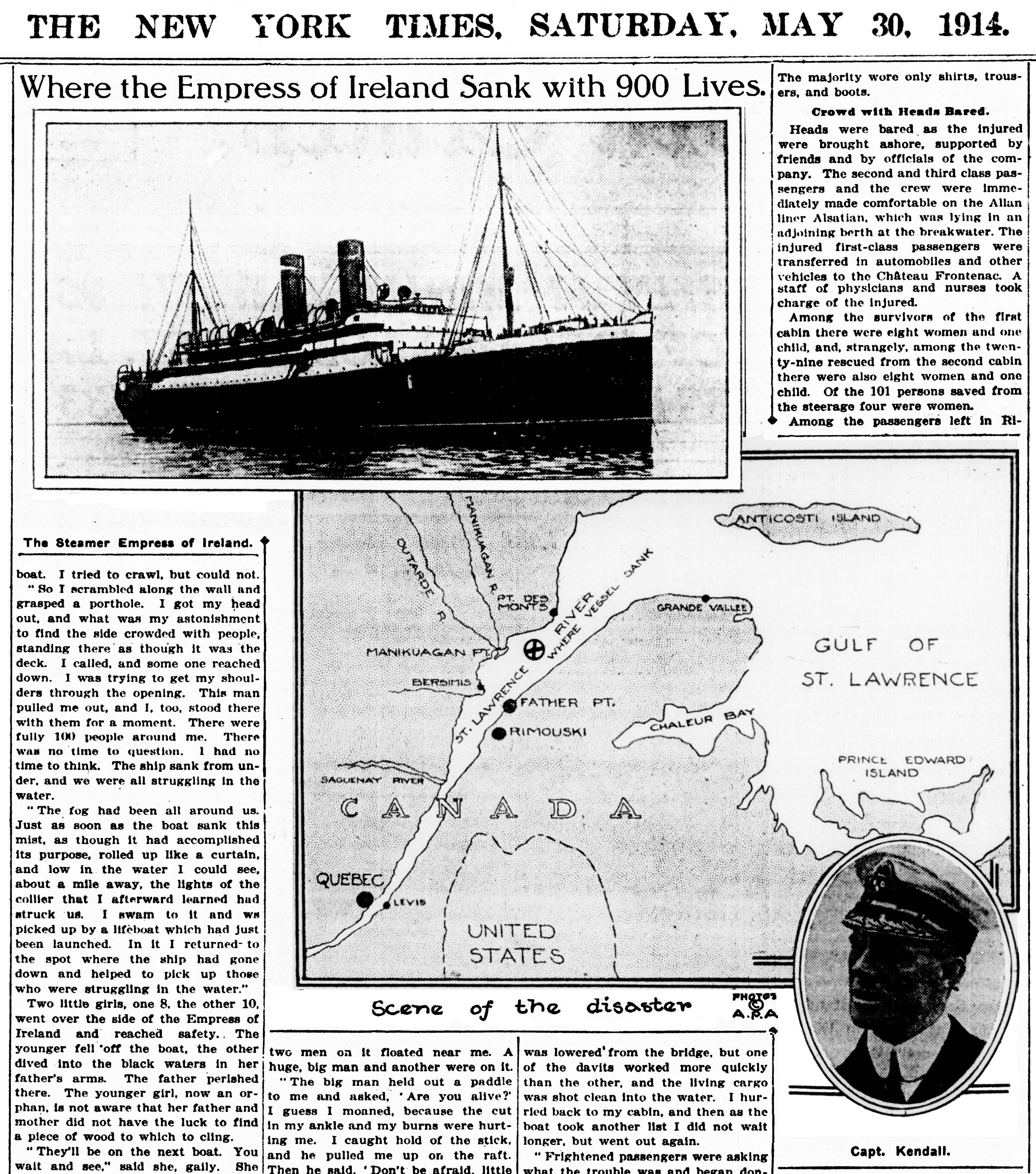
Newspaper's firsthand accounts accompany map showing location of the sinking on the St. Lawrence River less than 250 miles (400 km) from Quebec City.

Formal portrait of Captain Henry Kendall, the last captain of Empress of Ireland.

- Col. Robert Bloomfield of New Zealand's 3rd Mounted Regiment, his wife Isabella and their daughter Hilda.
- Laurence Irving, son of famous Victorian stage actor Sir Henry Irving, who since 1912 had been on an extended stage tour of Australia and North America, together with his wife and stage partner Mabel Hackney.
- Sir Henry Seton-Karr, a former member of the British House of Commons returning home from a hunting trip to British Columbia.
- Henry Lyman, head of the firm Lyman, Sons & Co, which in 1914 was the largest pharmaceutical company in Canada, who was bound for Europe for a belated honeymoon with his young wife, Florence.
- Wallace Palmer, associate editor for the Financial Times and his wife Ethel.
- George Smart, Inspector of British Immigrant Children and Receiving Homes.
- Lt. Col. Charles Tylee of the Canadian Army and his wife Martha.

Second class saw a considerably larger booking at just over half capacity with 253 passengers, owed greatly to a large party of Salvation Army members and their families, numbering 170 in all, who were travelling to attend the 3rd International Salvation Army Congress in London.

Third class saw the largest booking, which with 717 passengers was nearly filled to capacity. This complement reflected greatly the typical mix of steerage travellers seen on eastbound crossings aboard Empress of Ireland and her running mates on the North Atlantic which paralleled that seen on westbound crossings from Liverpool. While on westbound crossings third class passengers were predominantly diverse mixes of immigrants, eastbound crossings saw equally diverse blends of former immigrants from both Canada and the United States returning to their native countries in Europe. Many were returning to visit relatives, while others were in the process of re-emigrating and resettling.

Henry George Kendall had been promoted to captain of Empress of Ireland at the beginning of the month, and it was his first trip down the Saint Lawrence River in command of her.

=== Collision and sinking ===
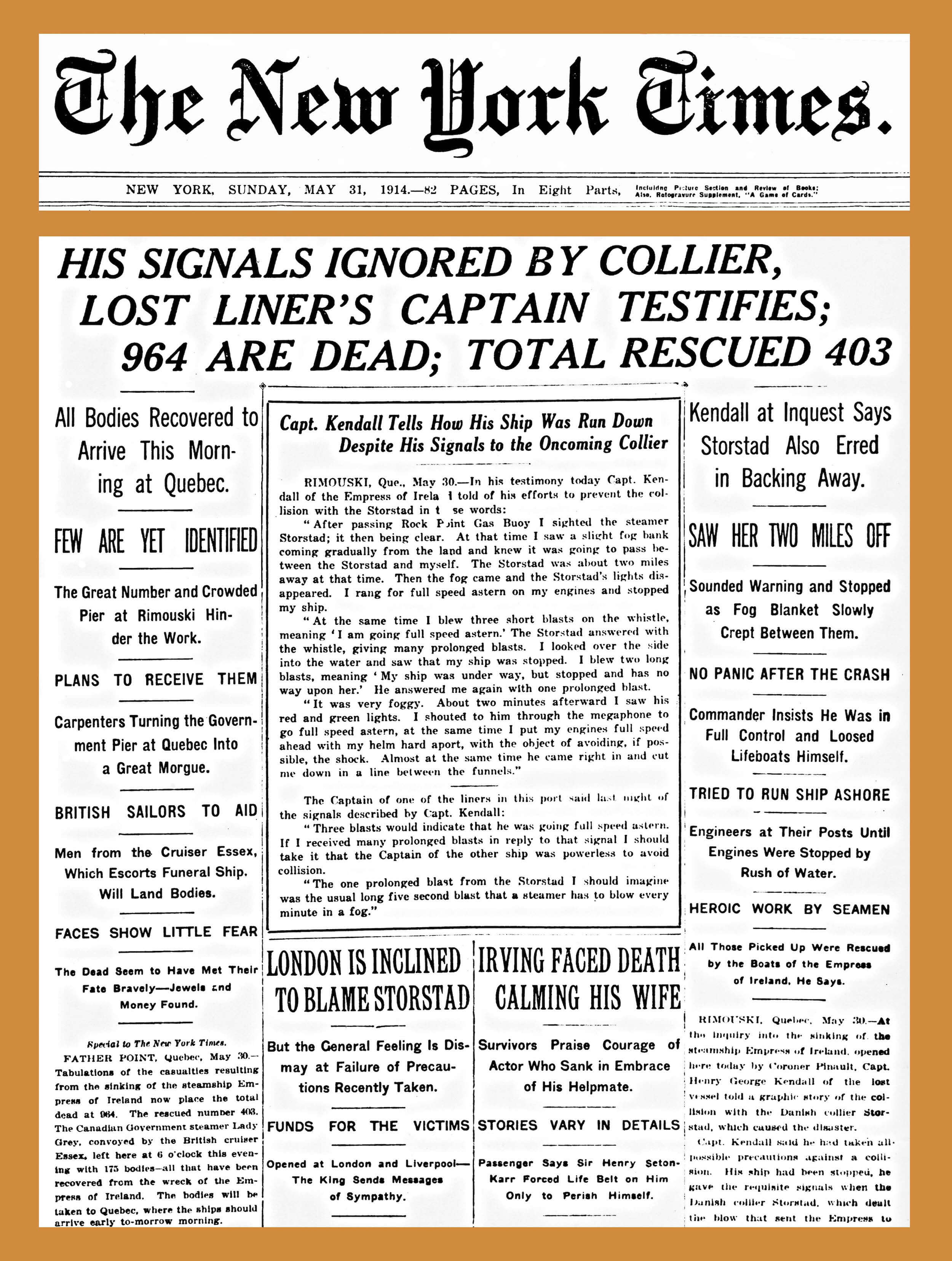
Within two days, newspapers related Captain Kendall's testimony of his ordering whistle warning blasts and evasive maneuvers as a fog bank closed between the ships.

Empress of Ireland reached Pointe-au-Père in the early hours of 29 May 1914, where the pilot disembarked. She resumed a normal outward bound course of about N76E (076 degrees) and soon sighted the masthead lights of SS Storstad, a Norwegian collier, on her starboard bow at a distance of several miles. Likewise, Storstad, which was abreast of Métis Point and on a virtually reciprocal course of W. by S. (259 degrees), sighted Empress of Ireland's masthead lights. These first sightings were made in clear weather conditions, but fog soon enveloped the ships. The ships resorted to repeated use of their fog whistles. At 01:56 local time, Storstad crashed into Empress of Ireland's starboard side at around midships. Storstad remained afloat, but Empress of Ireland was severely damaged. A gaping hole in her side caused the lower decks to flood at a rate alarming to the crew. Captain Kendall shouted to the crew of Storstad with a megaphone to keep her engines at full power and plug the hole, but Empress of Ireland continued her forward motion, and the current of the St. Lawrence shoved Storstad away after about five seconds, allowing 60,000 imperial gallons (270,000 litres) of water per second to begin pouring into Empress of Ireland.

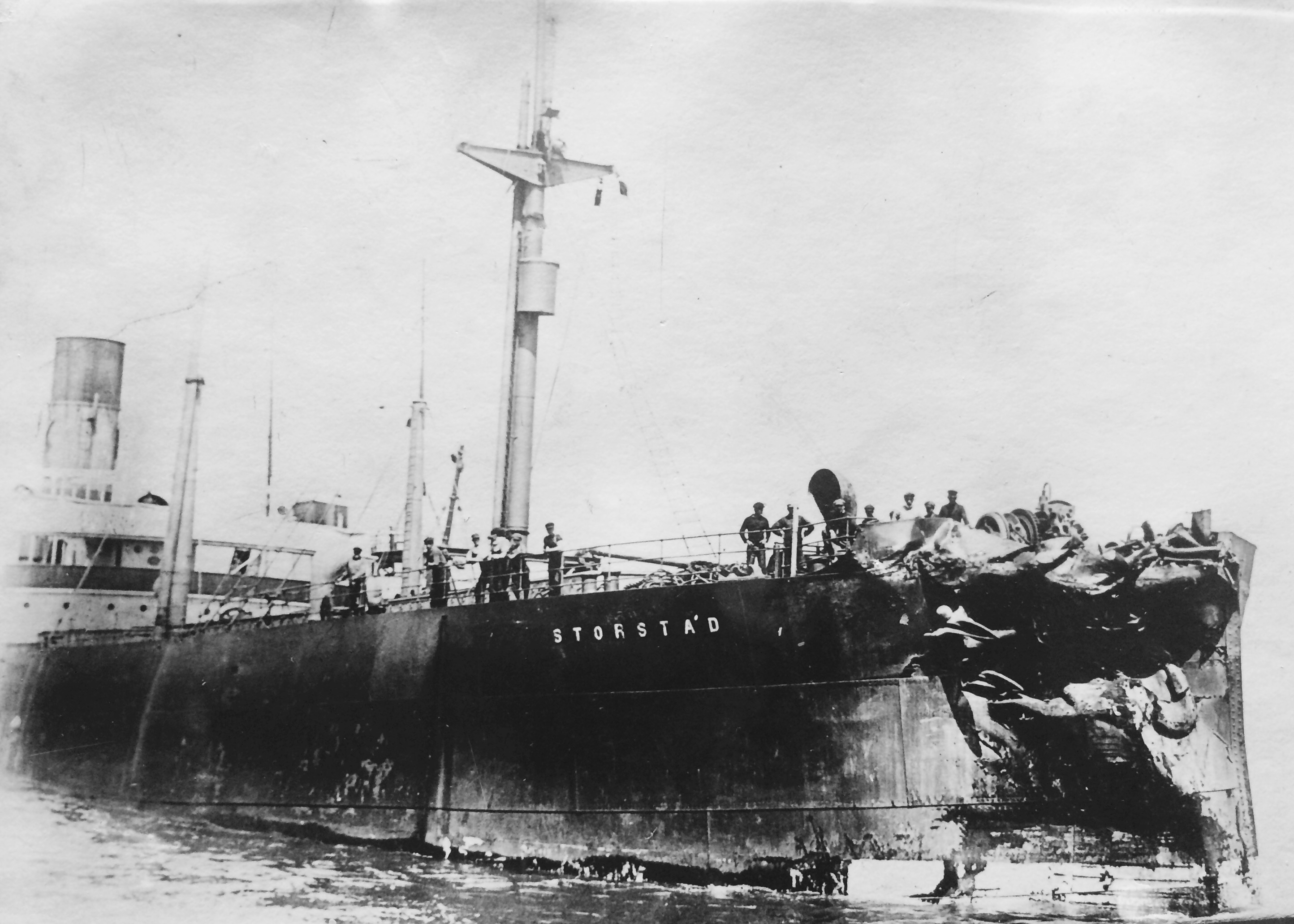
Damage sustained by Storstad after its collision with Empress of Ireland.

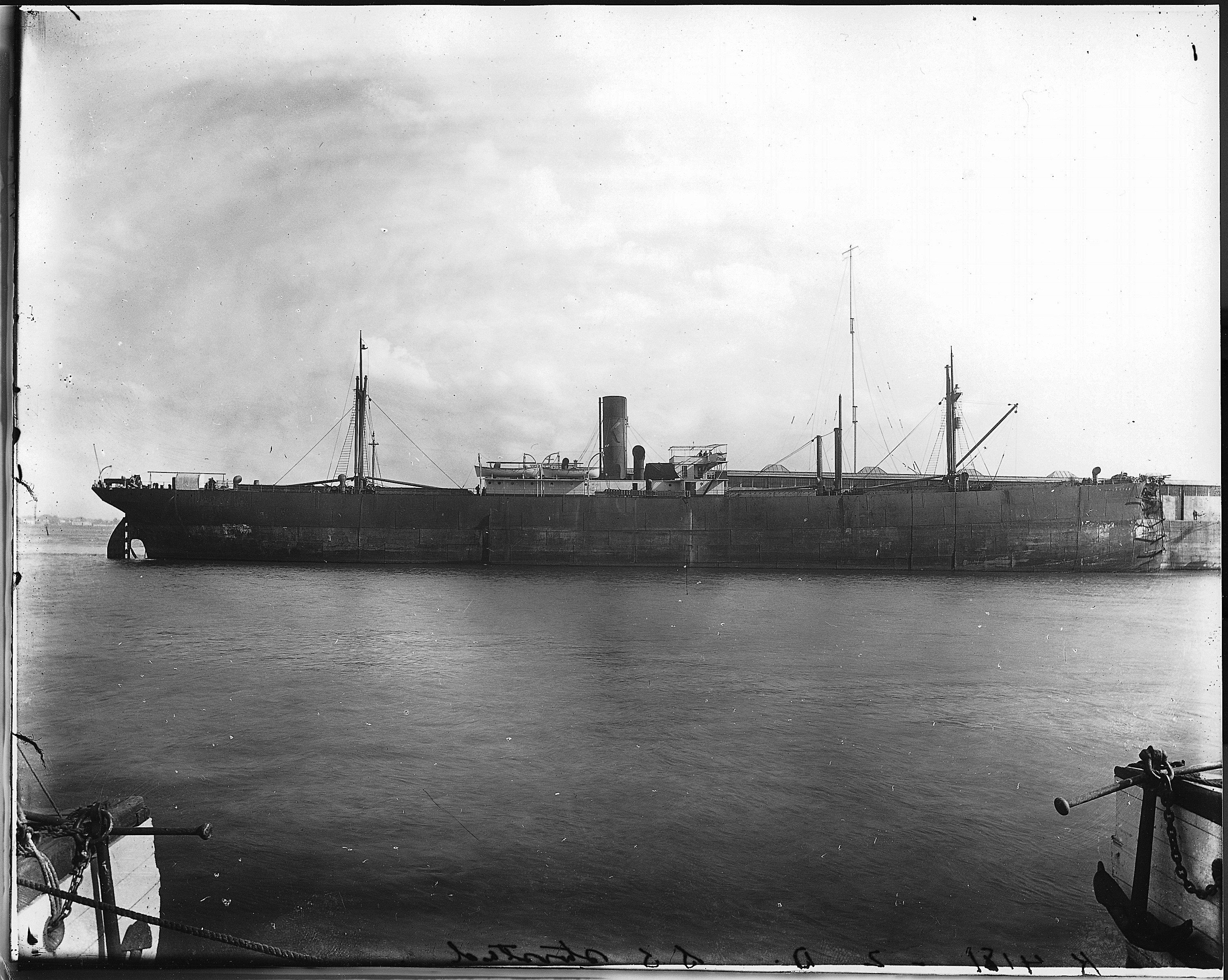
Storstad in Montreal after the collision.

Empress of Ireland lurched heavily to starboard and began settling by the stern. There was no time to shut the watertight doors. Water entered through open portholes, some only a few feet above the water line, and inundated passageways and cabins. Most of the passengers and crew located in the lower decks drowned quickly. Those berthed in the upper decks were awakened by the collision and immediately boarded lifeboats on the boat deck. Within a few minutes, the ship's list was so severe that the port lifeboats could not be launched. Some passengers attempted to do so but the lifeboats just crashed into the side of the ship, spilling their occupants into the frigid water. Five starboard lifeboats were launched successfully, while a sixth and seventh capsized during lowering.

The lights and power on Empress of Ireland eventually failed five or six minutes after the collision, plunging the ship into darkness. Ten minutes after the collision, the ship rolled violently over her starboard side, allowing as many as 700 passengers and crew to crawl out of the portholes and decks onto her port side. The ship lay upon her side for a minute or two, having seemingly run aground. Shortly afterwards at 02:10, about 14 minutes after the collision, the bow rose briefly out of the water and the ship finally sank. Hundreds of people were thrown into the near-freezing water. The disaster resulted in the deaths of 1,012 people. After being rescued by the Storstad, Kendall travelled directly to the bridge to confront the recently awoken Captain Thomas Anderson, saying, "You have just sunk my ship!".

=== Casualties and survivors ===
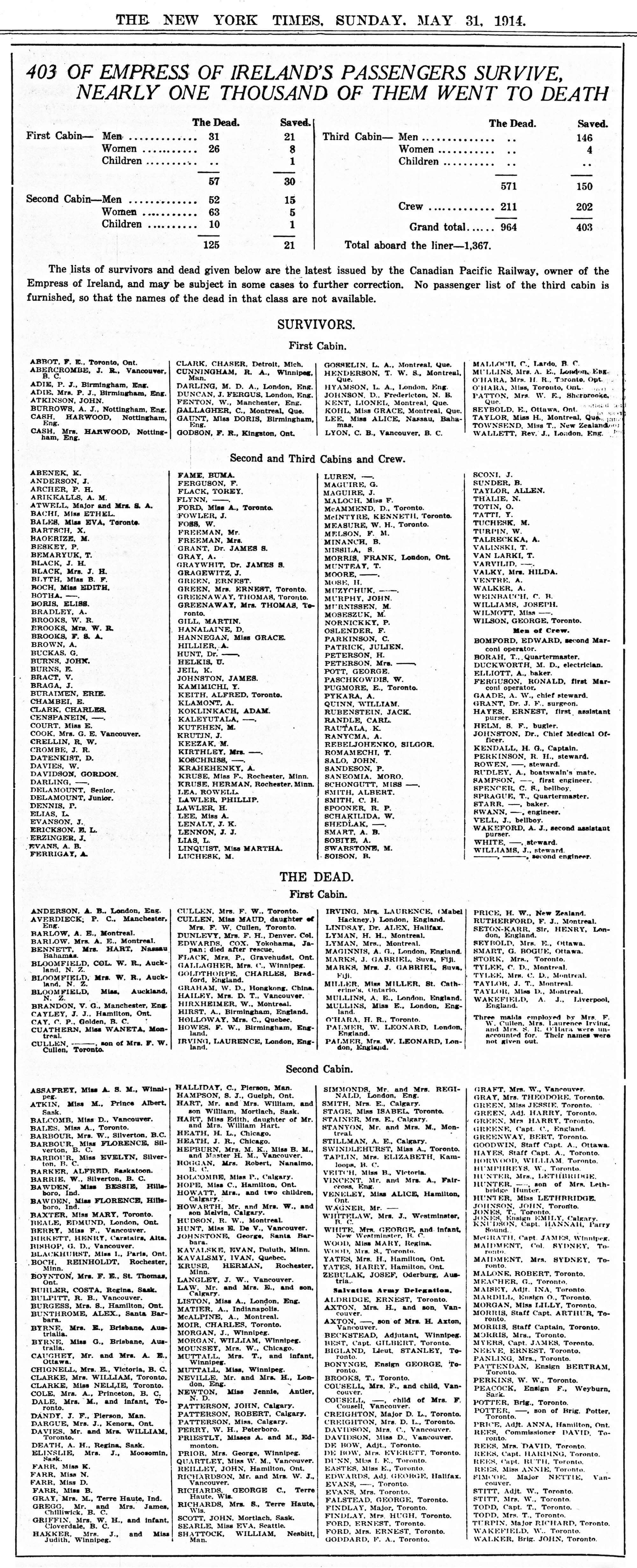
The New York Times published this list of survivors and casualties two days after the disaster.

There were only 465 survivors: 3 children (of 138), 41 women (of 310), 173 men (of 610), and 248 crew (of 420). The fact that most passengers were asleep at the time of the sinking (most not even awakened by the collision) also contributed to the loss of life when they were drowned in their cabins, most of them from the starboard side where the collision happened.

Amongst the dead were the English dramatist and novelist Laurence Irving and his wife Mabel Hackney; the explorer Henry Seton-Karr; Ella Hart-Bennett, the wife of British government official William Hart-Bennett; and Gabriel J. Marks, the first mayor of Suva, Fiji, along with his wife Marion. Lieutenant Charles Lindsay Claude Bowes-Lyon, a first cousin of the future Queen Elizabeth The Queen Mother survived the disaster, but died in combat only five months later on the Western Front near Ypres. The passengers included 167 members of the Salvation Army. These travellers, all but eight of whom died, were members of the Canadian Staff Band who were travelling to London for an international conference.

One of the three children who survived was 7-year-old Grace Hanagan, who was born in Oshawa, Ontario, on 16 May 1907, and was travelling with her parents, who were among the Salvation Army members who did not survive. Grace was also the last survivor of the sinking and died in St. Catharines, Ontario, on 15 May 1995 at the age of 87.

=== Rescue operations ===
Storstad, which remained afloat, lowered her own lifeboats and began to rescue the survivors in the water. The radio operator at Pointe-au-Père who picked up the emergency signal from Empress of Ireland notified two Canadian government steamers: the pilot boat Eureka at Pointe-au-Père Wharf, which left at full steam at 02:30; followed by the mail ship Lady Evelyn at Rimouski Wharf which left at 02:45. Eureka was the first on the scene at 03:10 and rescued about 150 survivors from the water. She brought them first to Pointe-au-Père, but was redirected to Rimouski Wharf where doctors and relief supplies were waiting. Lady Evelyn arrived at the site of sinking at 03:45. No survivors were left in the water but Lady Evelyn collected the 200 survivors rescued by Storstad, as well as 133 bodies, and arrived to join Eureka at the Rimouski Wharf about 05:15. Storstad was damaged but not severely, so her captain continued on to Quebec.

One of the survivors was Captain Kendall, who was on the bridge at the time of the collision and quickly ordered the lifeboats to be launched. When Empress of Ireland lurched onto her side, he was thrown from the bridge into the water, and was taken down with her as she began to go under. Swimming to the surface, he clung to a wooden grate long enough for crew members aboard a nearby lifeboat to row over and pull him in. Immediately, Kendall took command of the small boat and began rescue operations. The lifeboat's crew successfully pulled in many people from the water, and when the boat was full, Kendall ordered the crew to row to the lights of Storstad so that the survivors could be dropped off. He and the crew made a few more trips between Storstad and the wreck site to search for more survivors. After an hour or two, Kendall gave up, since any survivors who were still in the water would have either succumbed to hypothermia or drowned by then. Upon first boarding Storstad, Kendall stormed to the bridge, and levied an accusation at Captain Thomas Andersen: "You have sunk my ship!".

== Investigation ==
=== Commissioners ===
Inquiry court room presided over by Lord Mersey

The Commission of Inquiry, held in Quebec, commenced on 16 June 1914 and lasted for eleven days. Presiding over the contentious proceedings was Lord Mersey, who had previously presided over the SOLAS summit the year before, and had headed the official inquiries into a number of significant steamship tragedies, including that of Titanic. The following year, he would lead the inquiry into the sinking of Lusitania. Assisting Lord Mersey were two other commissioners: Sir Adolphe-Basile Routhier of Quebec, and Chief Justice Ezekiel McLeod of New Brunswick. All three commissioners were officially appointed by John Douglas Hazen, the Minister of Marine and Fisheries of Canada, under Part X of the Canada Shipping Act.

=== Twenty questions ===
At the beginning of the Inquiry twenty questions were formulated by the Canadian government. For example, was Empress of Ireland sufficiently and efficiently officered and manned? (Q.4); after the vessels had sighted each other's lights did the atmosphere between them become foggy or misty, so that lights could no longer be seen? If so, did both vessels comply with SOLAS Articles 15 and 16, and did they respectively indicate on their steam whistles or sirens, the course or courses they were taking by the signals set out? (Q.11); was a good and proper lookout kept on board of both vessels? (Q.19); and, was the loss of Empress of Ireland or the loss of life, caused by the wrongful act or default of the Master and First Officer of that vessel, and the Master, First, Second and Third Officers of Storstad, or any of them? (Q.20). All of these questions were addressed by the inquiry and answered in full in its report.

=== Witnesses ===
The inquiry heard testimony from a total of sixty-one witnesses: twenty-four crew and officers of Empress of Ireland (including Captain Kendall); twelve crew and officers of Storstad (including Captain Andersen); five passengers of Empress of Ireland; and twenty other people including two divers, two Marconi wireless operators at Pointe-au-Père, two naval architects, the harbour master at Quebec, and crew and officers of several other ships whose involvement either directly or indirectly was deemed pertinent.

=== Two stories ===
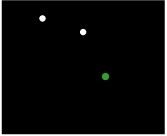
Illustrative navigation lights of Storstad as were claimed to have been seen from Empress of Ireland.

As reported in the newspapers at the time, there was much confusion as to the cause of the collision with both parties claiming the other was at fault. As was noted at the subsequent inquiry, "If the testimony of both captains were to be believed, the collision happened as both vessels were stationary with their engines stopped". The witnesses from Storstad said they were approaching so as to pass red to red (port to port) while those from Empress of Ireland said they were approaching so as to pass green to green (starboard to starboard), but "the stories are irreconcilable".

Two very different accounts of the collision were given at the Inquiry. Empress of Ireland's crew reported that after the pilot had been dropped at Pointe-au-Père, the ship proceeded to sea at full speed in order to obtain an offing from the shore. After a short time the masthead lights of a steamer, which subsequently proved to be Storstad, were sighted on the starboard bow, approximately six nautical miles (11 kilometres; 6.9 miles) away, the weather at that time being fine and clear. After continuing for some time, Empress of Ireland altered her course with the object of proceeding down the river. When making this change, the masthead lights of Storstad were still visible, about 4 1/2 nautical miles (8.3 km; 5.2 mi) away, and according to Captain Kendall it was intended to pass Storstad starboard to starboard at no risk of collision. The green light of Storstad was then sighted, but a little later a fog bank was seen coming off the land that dimmed Storstad's lights. The engines of Empress of Ireland were then stopped (and put full speed astern) and her whistle blown three short blasts signifying that this had been done. About a minute later the fog shut out the lights of Storstad completely. After exchanging further whistle blasts with Storstad, her masthead and side lights were seen by Captain Kendall about 100 feet away almost at right angles to Empress of Ireland and approaching at high speed. In the hope of possibly avoiding or minimizing the effect of a collision the engines of Empress of Ireland were ordered full speed ahead, but it was too late and Storstad struck Empress of Ireland amidships. Kendall placed the blame firmly on Storstad for the collision. Famously, the first words he said to Captain Andersen of Storstad after the sinking were, "You have sunk my ship!". He maintained for the rest of his life that it was not his fault the collision occurred.

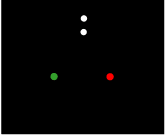
Illustrative navigation lights of Empress of Ireland as were claimed to have been seen from Storstad

Storstad's crew reported that the masthead lights of Empress of Ireland were first seen on the port bow about 6 or seven nautical miles (13 km; 8.1 mi) away; the lights were at that time open to starboard. A few minutes later, the green side light of Empress of Ireland was seen apparently from three to five nautical miles (six to nine kilometres; three to six miles) away. The green light remained for an interval, and then Empress of Ireland was seen to make a change in her course. Her masthead lights came into a (vertical) line, and she showed both the green and the red side lights. She then continued to swing to starboard, shutting out the green and showing only the red light. This light was observed for a few minutes before being obscured by the fog. At this moment, Empress of Ireland was about two miles away and Storstad's Chief Officer, Mr. Toftenes, assumed that it was Empress of Ireland's intention to pass him port to port (red to red), which the ships would do with ample room if their relative positions were maintained. After an exchange of whistle blasts with Empress of Ireland, Storstad was slowed and Captain Andersen (who was asleep in his cabin at the time) was called to the bridge. When he arrived, Andersen saw a masthead light moving quickly across Storstad's course from port to starboard whereupon he ordered the engines full speed astern. Immediately after Andersen saw the masthead light, he saw the green light, and a few moments later saw Empress of Ireland and the ships then collided.

=== Report ===
After all the evidence that had been heard, the Commissioners stated that the question as to who was to blame resolved itself into a simple issue, namely which of the two ships changed her course during the fog. They could come to "no other conclusion" than that it was Storstad that ported her helm and changed her course to starboard, and so brought about the collision. Chief Officer Toftenes of Storstad was specifically blamed for wrongly and negligently altering his course in the fog and, in addition, failing to call the captain when he saw the fog coming on.

Ultimately, the swift sinking and immense loss of life was attributed to three factors: the location in which Storstad made contact, failure to close Empress of Ireland's watertight doors, and longitudinal bulkheads that exacerbated the list by inhibiting cross flooding. A contributing factor was open portholes. Surviving passengers and crew testified that some upper portholes were left open for ventilation. The International Convention for the Safety of Life at Sea (SOLAS) requires that any openable portholes be closed and locked before leaving port, but portholes were often left open in sheltered waters like the Saint Lawrence River where heavy seas were not expected. When Empress of Ireland began to list to starboard, water poured through the open portholes further increasing flooding.

After the official inquiry was completed, Captain Andersen was quoted as saying that Lord Mersey was a "fool" for holding him responsible for the collision. He also announced that he intended to file a lawsuit against the CPR.

=== Litigation ===
The CPR won a court case against A. F. Klaveness & Co, the owners of Storstad, for C$2 million, which is the valuation of silver bullion stored aboard Empress of Ireland when she sank. The owners of Storstad entered an unsuccessful counterclaim against the CPR for $50,000 damages, contending that Empress of Ireland was at fault and alleging negligent navigation on her part. Storstad was seized at the request of the CPR and sold for $175,000 to Prudential Trust, an insurance company acting on behalf of AF Klaveness & Co.

=== Aftermath ===
On 5 June 1914, Canadian Pacific announced it had chartered the Allan Line's Virginian to fill in the void in service in its fleet left by the loss of Empress of Ireland, joining Empress of Britain and other previously acquired Canadian Pacific ships on the Saint Lawrence run. Virginian embarked from her first voyage from Liverpool under Canadian Pacific service on 12 June, which was to have been the next departure date from Liverpool of Empress of Ireland.

=== The Last Voyage of the Empress ===
In 2005 a Canadian television film, The Last Voyage of the Empress, investigated the sinking with historical reference, model re-enactment, and underwater investigation. The program's opinion was that the cause of the incident appeared to be the fog, exacerbated by the actions of Captain Kendall. Both captains were in their own way telling the truth, but with Kendall omitting the expediency of commanding Empress of Ireland in such a way as to keep his company's advertised speed of Atlantic crossing. In order to pass Storstad (off Empress's starboard bow) to quickly expedite this maintenance of speed, Kendall, in the fog, turned to starboard (towards Storstad) as part of a manoeuvre to spin back to his previous heading to pass the other ship as originally intended on his starboard side, thereby avoiding what he saw as a time-wasting diversion from his preferred and fast route through the channel. When Captain Anderson of Storstad saw Empress of Ireland through the fog he thought, by seeing both Empress of Ireland's port and starboard lights during its manoeuvre, that Empress of Ireland was attempting to pass on the opposite side of Storstad than previously apparent and turned his ship to starboard to avoid a collision. However, Empress of Ireland turned to port to continue on its original time-saving heading; thus the bow to side collision.

The conclusion of the programme was that both captains failed to abide by the condition that, on encountering fog, ships should maintain their heading, although the captain of Storstad deviated only after seeing the deviation of Empress of Ireland. In the film, water tank replication of the incident indicated that Empress of Ireland could not have been stationary at the point of the collision. It also indicated—through underwater observations of the ship's engine order telegraph in the engine room—that Kendall's assertion that he gave the order to close watertight doors was probably not true.

=== Legacy ===
The rapid sinking of Empress of Ireland has been cited by 20th-century naval architects, John Reid and William Hovgaard, as an example for making the case of discontinuation of longitudinal bulkheads which provide forward and aft separation between the outer coal bunkers and the inner compartments on ships. Though not entirely watertight, these longitudinal bulkheads trapped water between them. When the spaces flooded, this quickly forced a ship to list, pushing the portholes underwater. As flooding continued entering accommodation spaces, this only exacerbated the listing of the ship and dragging of the main deck down into the water. This would lead to the flooding of the upper compartments and finally the capsize and sinking of the ship. Reid and Hovgaard both cited the Empress of Ireland disaster as evidence which supported their conclusions that longitudinal subdivisions were very hazardous in ship collisions.

The foundering throes of Empress of Ireland are used in Chapter 2, and the wreck site features in Part IV of the Dirk Pitt adventure, Night Probe! by Clive Cussler.

Canadian author Louise Penny’s 2026 novel, Miss Wolcott’s Ghost (the 21st installment of her Chief Inspector Armand Gamache series) references the disaster.

== Wreck site ==
=== Salvage operation ===
Shortly after the disaster, a salvage operation began on Empress of Ireland to recover the purser's safe and the mail. This was deemed a plausible effort due to the wreck's relatively shallow depth at 22 fathoms (132 ft; 40 m), shallow enough so that in the aftermath of the sinking, the mainmast and funnels of the Empress were still visible just beneath the surface.

As they recovered bodies and valuables from the ship, the salvors were faced with limited visibility and strong currents from the Saint Lawrence River. One of the hard-hat divers, Edward Cossaboom, was killed when, it is assumed, he slipped from the hull of the wreck plummeting another 10.8 fathoms (19.8 m; 65 ft) to the riverbed below, closing or rupturing his air hose as he fell. He was found lying unconscious on his lifeline and all attempts to revive him after he was brought to the surface failed. It was later reported, implausibly, that the sudden increase in water pressure had so compressed the diver's body that all that remained was a "jellyfish with a copper mantle and dangling canvas tentacles." The salvage crew resumed their operations and recovered 318 bags of mail and 251 bars of silver (silver bullion) worth about $150,000 ($1,099,000 in 2013 when adjusted for inflation).

In 1964, the wreck was revisited by a group of Canadian divers who recovered a brass bell. In the 1970s, another group of divers recovered a telemotor, pieces of Marconi wireless equipment, a brass porthole and a compass. Robert Ballard, the oceanographer and maritime archaeologist who discovered the wrecks of Titanic and the German battleship Bismarck, visited the wreck of Empress of Ireland and found that she was being covered by silt. He also discovered that certain artefacts from fixtures to human remains continued to be taken out by "treasure hunters".

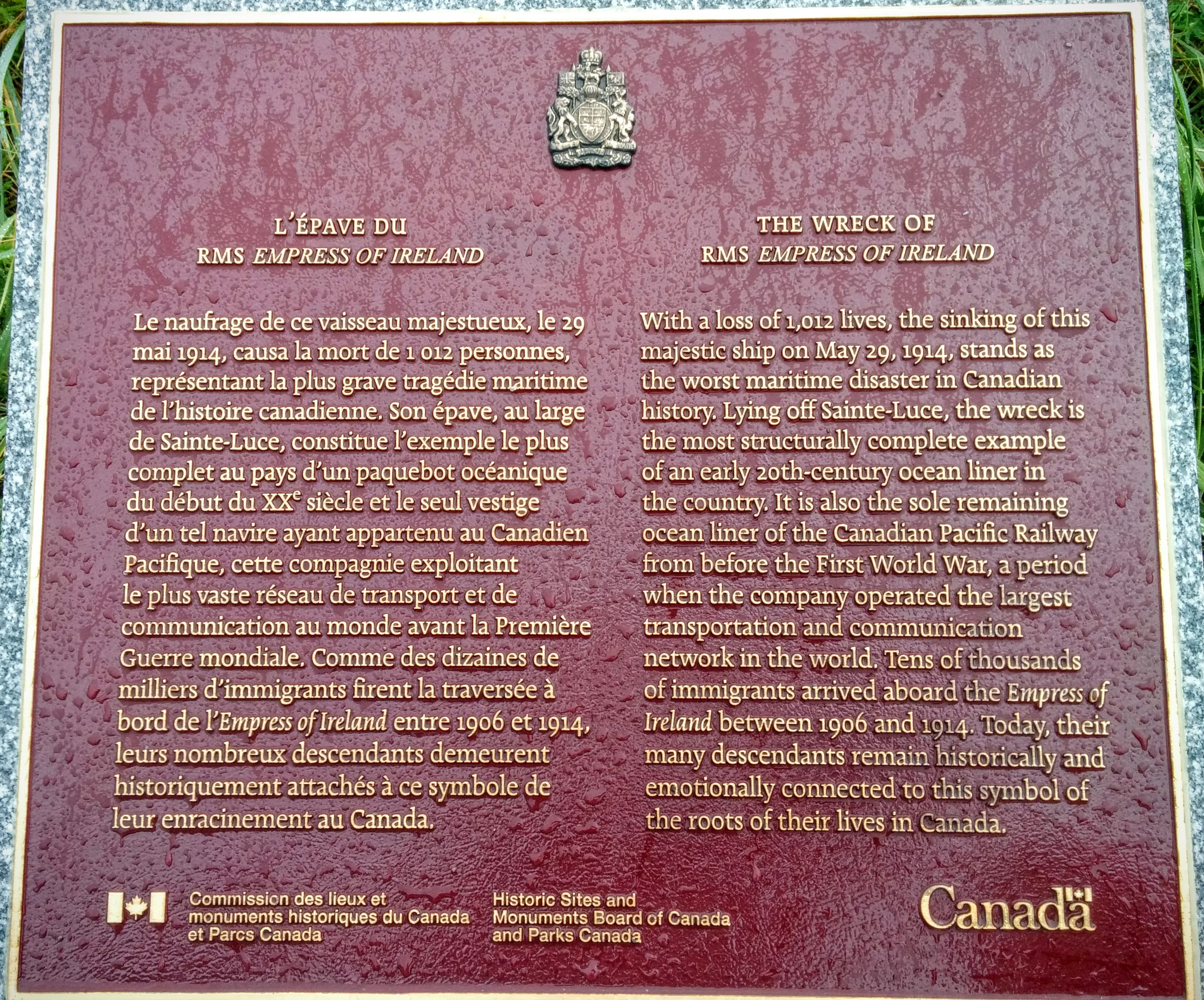
Commemorative plaque in Pointe-au-Père

=== Protecting the site ===
In the province of Quebec, shipwrecks are not afforded explicit protection. However, in 1999 the wreck was declared a site of historical and archaeological importance and thus became protected under the Cultural Property Act and was listed in the register of Historic Sites of Canada. This was the first time that an underwater site had received this status in Quebec.

This protection was important because, unlike Titanic, Empress of Ireland rests at the relatively shallow depth of 22 fathoms (40 m; 132 ft). While accessible to skilled recreational divers, the site is dangerous due to the cold water, strong currents and restricted visibility. As of 2009 six people had lost their lives on the dive.

== Memorials ==
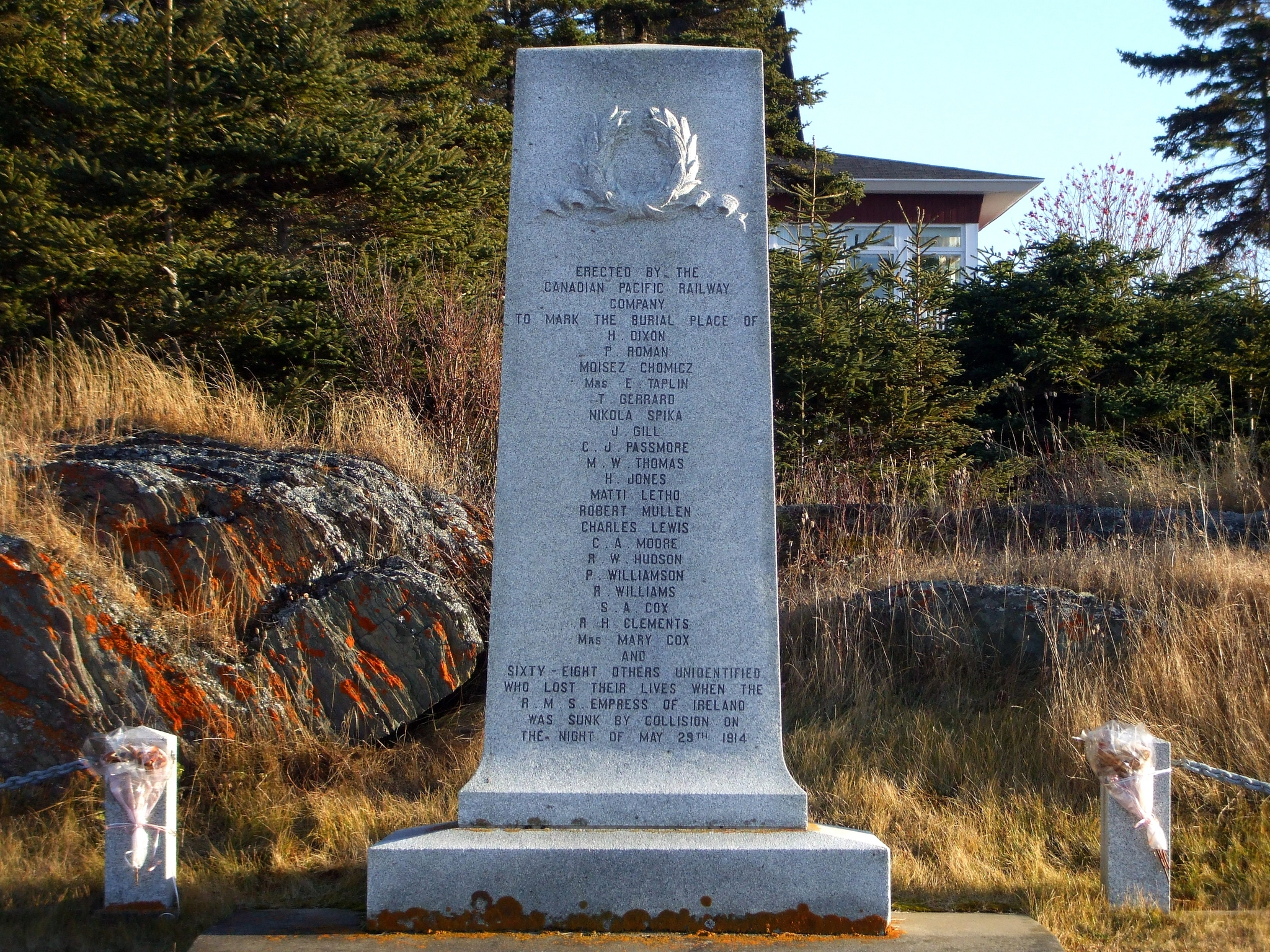
Memorial monument at Pointe-au-Père, Quebec

A number of monuments were erected, particularly by the CPR, to mark the burial places of those passengers and crew whose bodies were recovered in the days that followed the tragic sinking. For example, there are two monuments at Rimouski. One monument is located on the coastal road between Rimouski and Pointe-au-Père and is dedicated to the memory of eighty-eight persons; it is inscribed with twenty names, but the sixty-eight other persons are unidentified. A second monument is located at the cemetery in Rimouski (Les Jardins commémoratifs Saint-Germain) and is dedicated to the memory of a further seven persons, four of whom are named.

The CPR also erected several monuments in Quebec, e.g., Mount Hermon Cemetery and St. Patrick's Cemetery, both of which are located on the Sillery Heritage Site, at the formerly independent city of Sillery.

The Salvation Army erected its own monument at the Mount Pleasant Cemetery in Toronto. The inscription reads, "In Sacred Memory of 167 Officers and Soldiers of the Salvation Army Promoted to Glory From the Empress of Ireland at Daybreak, Friday May 29, 1914". A memorial service is held there every year on the anniversary of the accident.

== Commemorations ==
The hundredth anniversary of the sinking of Empress of Ireland was commemorated in May 2014, by numerous events, including an exhibition at the Canadian Museum of History entitled Empress of Ireland: Canada's Titanic which moved to the Canadian Museum of Immigration at Pier 21 in 2015.

Canada Post issued two stamps to commemorate the event. The Empress of Ireland domestic Permanent stamp was designed by Isabelle Toussaint, and is lithographed in seven colours. The Official First Day Cover was cancelled in Rimouski where survivors and victims were initially brought following the tragedy. The international denomination stamp was designed by Susan Scott using the oil on canvas illustration she commissioned from marine artist Aristides Balanos, and printed using lithography in six colours. The Official First Day Cover was cancelled at Pointe-au-Père, Quebec, the town closest to the site of the sinking.

The Royal Canadian Mint has also issued a 2014 coin commemorating the disaster.

== See also ==
- 1914 in Canada
- Emmy, ship's cat
- List of disasters in Canada
- List of Canadian disasters by death toll
- List of shipwrecks in 1914
- List of ocean liners
