= Vincent Bladen =

Vincent Wheeler Bladen

9th Dean of the University of Toronto Faculty of Arts and Science
- In office 1959–1966
- Preceded by: Moffat St Andrew Woodside
- Succeeded by: Albert Derrick Allen

Personal details
- Born: Vincent Wheeler Bladen; 14 August 1900 Stoke-on-Trent, England
- Died: 26 November 1981 (aged 81) Toronto, Ontario
- Education: Balliol College, Oxford
- Occupation: economist and academic
- Awards: Order of Canada

Vincent Wheeler Bladen, OC (14 August 1900 – 26 November 1981) was a British-Canadian economist and professor at the University of Toronto.

Upon completing his degree at Balliol College, Oxford, Bladen began teaching at the University of Toronto in September 1921, where he later served as dean of the Faculty of Arts and Science from 1959 to 1966. In 1960, he was appointed Chairman of the Royal Commission on the Automotive Industry which helped to create the Canadian-American Automotive Agreement. Bladen retired from teaching in 1969, but continued to give lectures.

Bladen was the founding editor of the Canadian Journal of Economics and Political Science. Several editions of Bladen's An Introduction to Political Economy were published during his lifetime. In 1962, he edited Canadian Population and Northern Colonization. In 1974, Bladen's book From Adam Smith to Maynard Keynes : the heritage of political economy was published. His memoirs, Bladen on Bladen, were published in 1978.

In 1976, Bladen was made an Officer of the Order of Canada, Canada's highest civilian honor. He was awarded an honorary Doctor of Laws from Carleton University in 1966 and York University in 1975.

The Bladen Wing at the University of Toronto Scarborough is named in his honour.
