= Robert Ramsay Wright =

Scottish zoologist and academic (1852–1933)

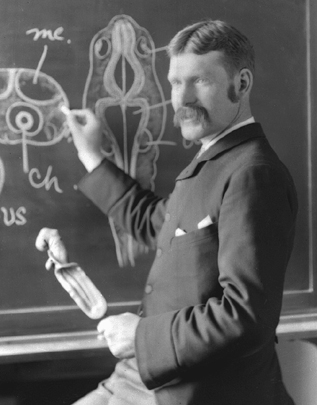
- Robert Ramsay Wright in the 1880s

2nd Dean of the University of Toronto Faculty of Arts
- In office 1901–1912
- Preceded by: James Beaven
- Succeeded by: Alfred Baker

Personal details
- Born: 23 September 1852 Alloa, Scotland
- Died: 6 September 1933 (aged 80) Droitwich Spa, England
- Scientific career
- Education: University of Edinburgh
- Fields: Zoology
- Workplaces: University of Toronto

Robert Ramsay Wright (23 September 1852 – 6 September 1933) was a Scottish zoologist and academic whose professional career was spent in Canada.

Born in a manse at Alloa, Clackmannanshire, he studied at Edinburgh High School before receiving a B.Sc. and M.A from the University of Edinburgh.

In 1874, he was appointed a Professor of Natural History at the University of Toronto where he would remain until he retired in 1912. In 1887, he was appointed the first Professor of Biology at the University of Toronto. He was also instrumental in re-establishing the medical school at the University of Toronto in 1887. He was Dean of Arts from 1901 to 1912 and was appointed a Vice-President of the University in 1902.

In 1889 his textbook An introduction to zoology: for the use of high schools was published by The Copp, Clark Company in Toronto.

Professional and academic associations
Preceded by William Frederick King	President of the Royal Society of Canada; 1910–1911	Succeeded by George Bryce
