= Alfred Baker (academic) =

Canadian academic

3rd Dean of the University of Toronto Faculty of Arts
- In office 1912–1919
- Preceded by: Robert Ramsay Wright
- Succeeded by: Arthur Philemon Coleman

Personal details
- Born: c. 1848 Toronto, Canada West
- Died: October 27, 1942 (aged 93–94)

Alfred Baker (c. 1848 – October 27, 1942) was a Canadian academic at the University of Toronto. A Fellow of the Royal Society of Canada, he was its president from 1915 to 1916.

== Biography ==
Born in Toronto, of Yorkshire parents, Baker was educated at the Toronto Grammar School and the University of Toronto. He was appointed a mathematical tutor in University College in 1875 and was a registrar in 1880. Baker was a professor of mathematics at the University of Toronto and was the first chair of the Department of Mathematics from 1887 until 1919.

He served as the third dean of the Faculty of Arts from 1912 to 1919.

Professional and academic associations
Preceded by Adolphe-Basile Routhier	President of the Royal Society of Canada; 1915–1916	Succeeded by Archibald Macallum
