= Adolphe-Basile Routhier =

Canadian judge and poet (1839–1920)

Sir Adolphe-Basile Routhier FRSC
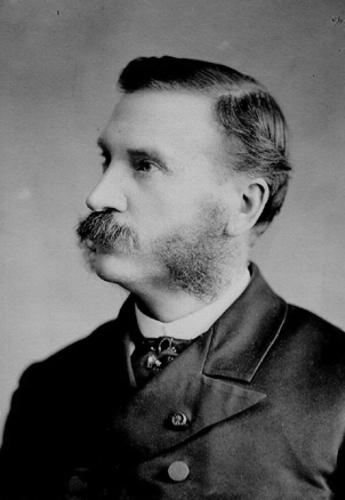
- Routhier in c. 1890
- Born: May 8, 1839; Saint-Benoît (Saint-Placide), Lower Canada
- Died: June 27, 1920 (aged 81); Saint-Irénée-les-Bains, Quebec, Canada
- Resting place: Cimetière Notre-Dame-de-Belmont
- Occupations: lawyer, author, judge, and professor
- Known for: Writing the lyrics of the original French version of the Canadian national anthem "O Canada"
- Title: President of the Royal Society of Canada
- Term: 1913–1914
- Predecessor: Frank Dawson Adams
- Successor: Alfred Baker
- Spouse: Clorinde Mondelet (m. 1862)

Sir Adolphe-Basile Routhier FRSC (French pronunciation: [adɔlf bazil ʁutje]; May 8, 1839 – June 27, 1920) was a Canadian judge, author, and lyricist. He wrote the lyrics of the original French version of the Canadian national anthem "O Canada". He was born in Saint-Placide, Quebec, to Charles Routhier and Angélique Lafleur.

== Early life and education ==
Routhier was born and grew up in Saint-Placide, Quebec, on his family's farm. He attended Séminaire de Ste-Thérèse, and later studied law at Université Laval. He graduated and was called to the Quebec bar in 1861.

== Career ==
Routhier practised law in Kamouraska until he was appointed to the Quebec Superior Court in 1873 (as Chief Justice from 1904 to 1906) and local judge in admiralty of the Exchequer Court of Canada (from 1897 to 1906).

Routhier ran as a Conservative candidate for the riding of Kamouraska in several federal elections, but he was never elected.

Routhier wrote a number of books under the name Jean Piquefort.

Routhier's poem "Ô Canada" was commissioned by the Lieutenant Governor of Quebec Théodore Robitaille for the 1880 Saint-Jean-Baptiste Day ceremony.

In June 1914, Routhier was one of the three judges appointed to conduct the Commission of Inquiry into the sinking of the Canadian Pacific steamship Empress of Ireland, which had resulted in the loss of 1,012 lives.

== Personal ==
Routhier married Clorinde Mondelet on November 12, 1862, in Quebec and had one son.

== Honours ==
Many sites and landmarks were named to honour Basile Routhier. They include:

- Rue Basile-Routhier (Basile-Routhier Street), located in Shawinigan, Quebec, Canada;
- Place Basile-Routhier, located in Shawinigan;
- Rue Basile-Routhier in Montreal, Quebec;
- Boulevard Basile-Routhier in Repentigny, Quebec.
- Avenue Sir Adolphe Routhier in Quebec City, Quebec, Canada;

== Selected publications ==
- Les Echos, P. G. Delisle, 1882.

Professional and academic associations
Preceded by Frank Dawson Adams	President of the Royal Society of Canada; 1914–1915	Succeeded by Alfred Baker
