= James Beaven =

Canadian priest (1801–1875)

1st Dean of the University of Toronto Faculty of Arts
- In office 1844–1853
- Preceded by: Position established
- Succeeded by: Robert Ramsay Wright

Personal details
- Born: 9 July 1801
- Died: 8 November 1875 (aged 74)

James Beaven (9 July 1801 – 8 November 1875) was a Church of England clergyman and author, educated and employed in England until accepting an appointment as professor of divinity at the University of Toronto, in 1843.

Beaven served as the first dean of the original University of Toronto Faculty of Arts (the predecessor to what would later become the University of Toronto Faculty of Arts and Science) from 1844 to 1853.

Beaven was an accomplished classical scholar and wrote a number of books. Three of these were scholarly sermons. His subjects also included the writings of Cicero and the life and writings of St Irenaeus. A well known book documented a diocesan tour in 1845 by Bishop John Strachan. His Elements of Natural Theology is sometimes regarded as the first philosophical work written in English in Canada.

Beaven and his wife had seven children; one son, Robert, became premier of British Columbia from 1882 to 1883.
