= Lake Coleman =

Paleolake in Canada

Lake Coleman was a large lake, in the same basin as Lake Ontario, during an interglacial period, approximately 75,000 years ago. Its level was 20 metres (66 ft) higher than Lake Ontario.

Lake Coleman was named after Arthur Philemon Coleman, a respected geologist whose excavations played a role in discovering the existence of the lake.

== See also ==
Glacial Lake Iroquois

Great Lakes

Lake Ontario
