= William Dawson LeSueur =

Author and Civil Servant

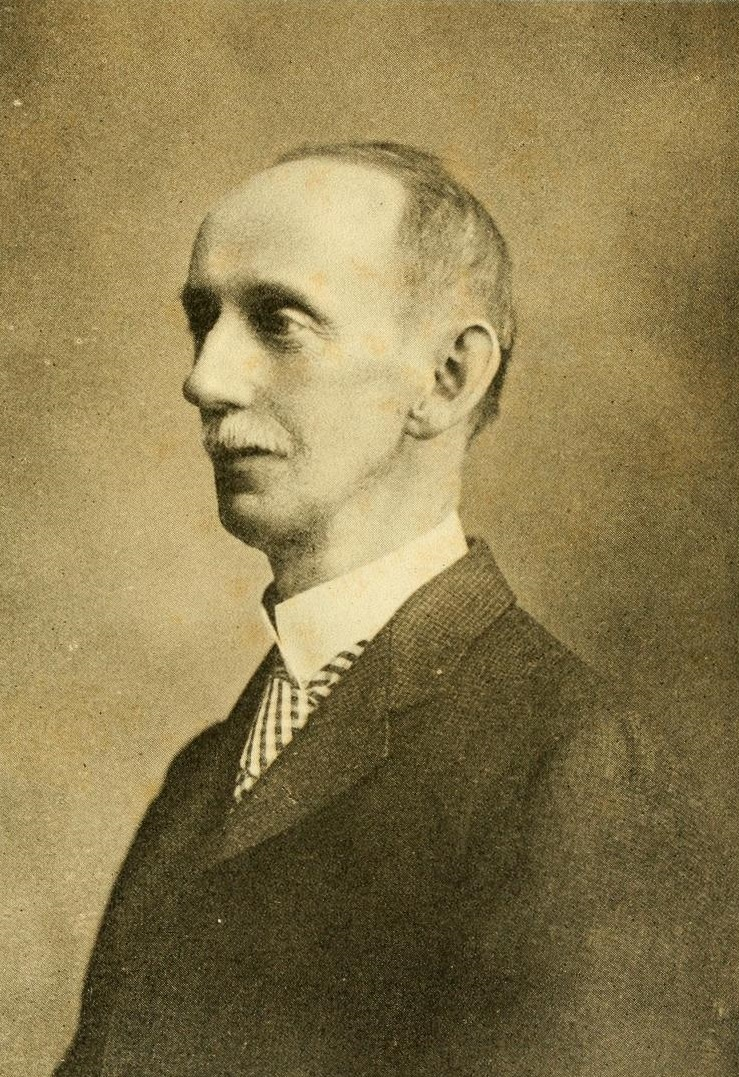
- Born: February 19, 1840; Quebec City, Lower Canada
- Died: September 23, 1917 (aged 77); Ottawa, Ontario
- Resting place: Beechwood Cemetery, Ottawa, Ontario
- Citizenship: British subject
- Education: University of Toronto
- Occupations: Civil Servant, author
- Spouse: Anne Jane Foster
- Writing career
- Language: English

William Dawson LeSueur (February 19, 1840 – September 23, 1917) was a Canadian civil servant and author.

== Biography ==
Born in Quebec City, the son of Peter LeSueur and Barbara Dawson, LeSueur studied Latin and Greek at the High School of Montreal. In 1856, he joined the provincial Post Office Department after moving to Toronto. He received a Bachelor of Arts degree in 1863 from the University of Toronto and studied law at Osgoode Hall Law School but never practiced. He continued to work as a clerk for the post office eventually becoming chief secretary in 1888. He retired in 1902.

A writer, LeSueur published over 80 articles on a wide variety of topics. He was a freelance journalist for the Montreal Daily Star, the Montreal Gazette, and the Ottawa Citizen.

In 1906, he published a biography of Louis de Buade de Frontenac. LeSueur was asked by Messrs. Morang and Co. to write a biography of William Lyon Mackenzie for their "Makers of Canada Series". The biography stated that Mackenzie's actions held back the cause of reform in Canada and that he was inconsequential to the history of Canada in the 1850s. Mackenzie's grandson William Lyon Mackenzie King pressured Morang into rejecting the manuscript, although Morang stated he didn't publish it because he wanted a more positive portrayal of Mackenzie's life.

In 1903, he was made a Fellow of the Royal Society of Canada and served as its president from 1912 to 1913. He was awarded an honorary Doctor of Laws degree from Queen's College in 1900.

He died in Ottawa in 1917 and is buried in Beechwood Cemetery.

== Selected publications ==
- (1879). "A Few Words on Criticism," The Canadian Monthly and National Review, Vol. III, pp. 323–328.
- (1879). "The Scientific Spirit," The Canadian Monthly and National Review, Vol. III, pp. 437–441.
- (1880). "The Future of Morality," The Canadian Monthly and National Review, Vol. IV, pp. 74–82.
- (1880). "Morality and Religion," The Canadian Monthly and National Review, Vol. IV, pp. 166–171.
- (1880). "Morality and Religion Again – A Word to My Critics," The Canadian Monthly and National Review, Vol. IV, pp. 642–655.
- (1880). "Morality without Theology," The Canadian Monthly and National Review, Vol. V, pp. 522–528.
- (1880). "A Vindication of Scientific Ethics," The Popular Science Monthly, Vol. XVII, pp. 324–337.
- (1881). "'Progress and Poverty' and the Doctrine of Evolution," The Canadian Monthly and National Review, Vol. VI, pp. 287–296.
- (1881). "Carlyle and Comte," The Canadian Monthly and National Review, Vol. VI, pp. 639–642.
- (1882). "The True Idea of Canadian Loyalty," The Canadian Monthly and National Review, Vol. VIII, pp. 1–11.
- (1882). "Physics and Metaphysics," The Canadian Monthly and National Review, Vol. VIII, pp. 352–360.
- (1882). "Free Thought and Responsible Thought," The Canadian Monthly and National Review, Vol. VIII, pp. 614–620.
- (1882). "Materialism and Positivism," The Popular Science Monthly, Vol. XX, pp. 615–621.
- (1882). "Mr. Goldwin Smith on the Data of Ethics," The Popular Science Monthly, Vol. XXII, pp. 145–156.
- (1883). "The Anarchy of Modern Politics," The Popular Science Monthly, Vol. XXIII, pp. 444–453.
- (1884). "A Defense of Modern Thought," The Popular Science Monthly, Vol. XXIV, pp. 780–793.
- (1885). "Evolution and the Destiny of Man," The Popular Science Monthly, Vol. XXVI, pp. 456–468.
- (1886). "Evolution Bounded by Theology," The Popular Science Monthly, Vol. XXIX, pp. 145–153.
- (1886). "Ex-President Porter on Evolution," The Popular Science Monthly, Vol. XXIX, pp. 577–594.
- (1887). "Creation or Evolution?," The Popular Science Monthly, Vol. XXXI, pp. 29–39.
- (1889). "Mr. Mallock on Optimism," The Popular Science Monthly, Vol. XXXV, pp. 531–541.
- (1889). "Science and its Accusers," The Popular Science Monthly, Vol. XXXIV, pp. 367–379.
- (1893). "State Education and 'Isms'," The Canadian Magazine, Vol. II, No. 1, pp. 3–7.
- (1895). "Kidd on 'Social Revolution'," The Popular Science Monthly, Vol. XLVII, pp. 38–48.
- (1896). "War and Civilization," The Popular Science Monthly, Vol. XLVIII, pp. 758–771.

== Notes ==
Professional and academic associations
Preceded by William Frederick King	President of the Royal Society of Canada; 1912–1913	Succeeded by Frank Dawson Adams
