= University of Toronto Faculty of Arts and Science =

Division of the University of Toronto

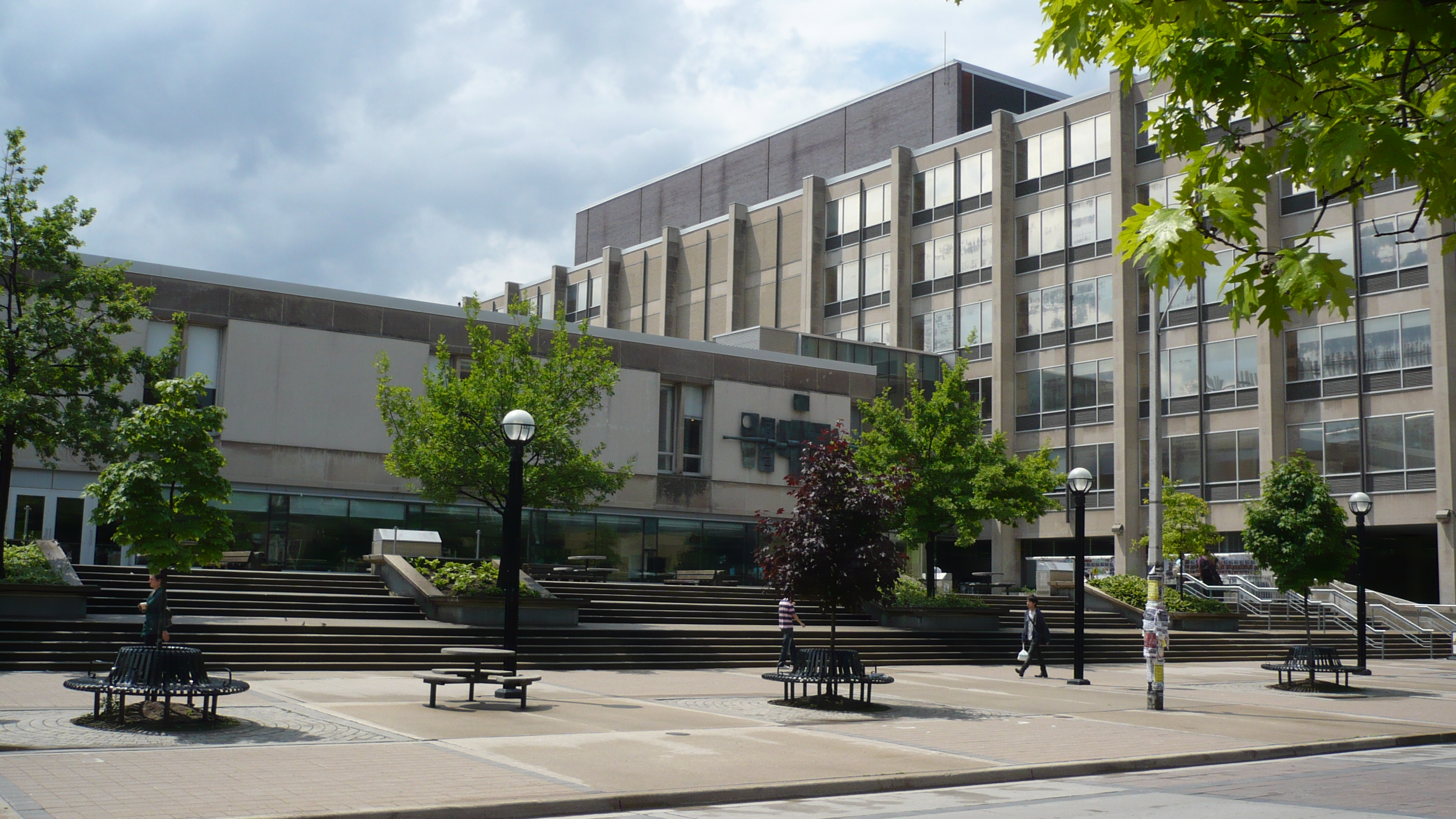
- Sidney Smith Hall, the central faculty building
- Former name: Faculty of Arts (1887–1960)
- Type: Public
- Established: 1887; 139 years ago
- Parent institution: University of Toronto
- Dean: Stephen Wright
- Academic staff: 930
- Undergraduates: 31,000
- Postgraduates: 4,700
- Location: Toronto, Ontario, Canada; 43°39′45″N 79°23′55″W
- Website: artsci.utoronto.ca

The Faculty of Arts and Science (A&S) is an academic division of the University of Toronto, based on its St. George campus in Toronto, Ontario, Canada. It is the largest and most academically diverse division of the university.

The faculty's undergraduate system is composed of seven affiliated colleges: Innis, New, St. Michael's, Trinity, University, Victoria, and Woodsworth. With more than 31,000 undergraduate and 4,700 graduate students, the Faculty of Arts and Science makes up over one third of the university's student population as a whole.

The faculty is nearly as old as the university itself, beginning as the Faculty of Arts during the University of Toronto's inauguration in 1843. One of its affiliated colleges, Victoria College, predates the official opening of the university. The Faculty of Arts and Science represents over half of the student population on the St. George campus; it hosts 64 per cent of its undergraduates and about one third of graduates who pursue degrees in the humanities, social sciences and sciences. It has 800 professors who teach some 2,000 courses arranged in more than 400 undergraduate and 150 graduate programs hosted by 29 departments, 49 centres and institutes. Graduate programs are hosted by the faculty's academic units through the School of Graduate Studies and typically operate tri-campus, with some programs offered at any of the three University of Toronto campuses: St. George, Mississauga and Scarborough.

== Timeline of its history ==
Below is a timeline of the Faculty of Arts and Science:

- 1827: King's College was established by Royal Charter.
- 1836: Upper Canada Academy founded at Cobourg, Ontario. It became Victoria College in 1841.
- 1843: The official opening of King's College. Its first degrees were granted in 1844.
- 1849: King's College became the University of Toronto and cut ties with the Church of England.
- 1851: University of Trinity College was established by the Church of England.
- 1852: St. Michael’s College was established by the Basilian Order.
- 1853: University College was established, assuming responsibility for all teaching in Arts in the University; the University became an examining and degree-granting body.
- 1856: Construction of present University College building started, completed in 1859.
- 1881: St. Michael’s College became affiliated with the University; it became fully federated in 1910.
- 1887: Instruction at the University of Toronto began in fields other than arts and the sciences. University College became purely an Arts College.
- 1890: The east section of the University College building, including University Library, was gutted by a fire.
- 1892: Victoria College moved from Cobourg and federated with the University of Toronto.
- 1904: Trinity College federated with the University of Toronto.
- 1905: Part-time courses leading to the Bachelor of Arts degree were established.
- 1920: The Bachelor of Commerce degree was established.
- 1925: Trinity College moved to its present buildings from its original Queen Street site.
- 1960: Name of the Faculty of Arts changed to the “Faculty of Arts and Science.”
- 1961: The Bachelor of Science degree was established.
- 1962: New College was established.
- 1964: Innis College was established.
- 1965: Scarborough College was established.
- 1967: Erindale College was established.
- 1971: Scarborough College became a separate Arts and Science division of the university.
- 1973: John P. Robarts Research Library opened.
- 1974: Woodsworth College was established.
- 2003: The University of Toronto at Mississauga (formerly Erindale College) became a separate Arts and Science division of the university.

== Academics ==
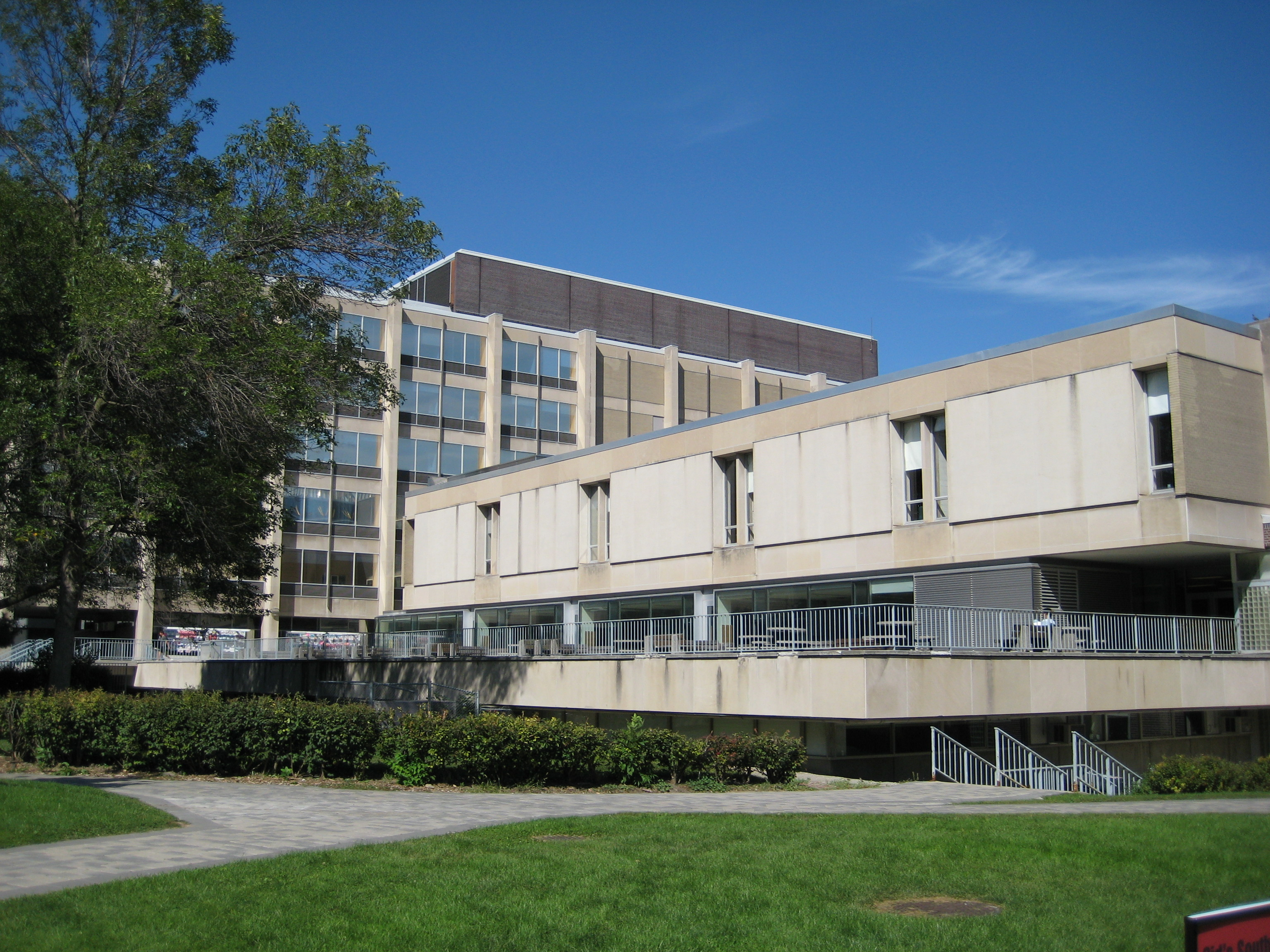
Sidney Smith Hall in 2009

=== Colleges ===
Every undergraduate student in the Faculty of Arts and Science belongs to one of seven colleges on the St. George campus. These include the constituent colleges (Innis, New, University, and Woodsworth) and undergraduate colleges of the federated universities (St. Michael's, Trinity, and Victoria). The University of Toronto Scarborough (originally known as Scarborough College) was part of the faculty until it became a separate academic division in 1972. Likewise, the University of Toronto Mississauga (originally Erindale College) separated from the faculty in the 2003 academic year following significant growth in enrolment.

While the colleges are not entirely responsible for teaching duties, most of them house specialized academic programs and lecture series. Among other subjects, Trinity College is associated with programs in international relations, as are University College with Canadian studies, Victoria College with Renaissance studies, Innis College with film studies and urban studies, New College with gender studies, Woodsworth College with industrial relations and St. Michael's College with Medieval studies.

=== Academic units ===
The faculty consists of 29 academic departments, 7 colleges, and 45 interdisciplinary centres, institutes and programs. Below is a list of departments in the faculty:

- Department of Anthropology
- David A. Dunlap Department of Astronomy and Astrophysics
- Department of Art History
- Department of Cell and Systems Biology
- Department of Chemistry
- Department of Classics
- Department of Computer Science
- Department of Earth Sciences
- Department of East Asian Studies
- Department of Ecology and Evolutionary Biology
- Department of Economics
- Department of English
- Department of French
- Department of Geography and Planning
- Department of Germanic Languages and Literatures
- Department of History
- Department of Italian Studies
- Department of Linguistics
- Department of Mathematics
- Department of Near and Middle Eastern Civilizations
- Department of Philosophy
- Department of Physics
- Department of Political Science
- Department of Psychology
- Department for the Study of Religion
- Department of Slavic Languages and Literatures
- Department of Sociology
- Department of Spanish and Portuguese
- Department of Statistical Sciences

Notable extra-departmental units (EDUs) of the faculty include:

- Dunlap Institute for Astronomy and Astrophysics
- School of Cities
- School of the Environment
- Centre for Medieval Studies
- Munk School of Global Affairs & Public Policy
- Schwartz Reisman Institute for Technology and Society

=== Rotman Commerce ===
Rotman Commerce is an undergraduate business program on the St. George campus administered jointly by the Faculty of Arts and Science and the Rotman School of Management. The program's first graduating class was in 1924. In April 2008, the program was renamed as Rotman Commerce after a $2.5 million gift from Sandra and Joseph Rotman. Although the program name has changed, the B.Com. degree continues to be awarded by the Faculty of Arts and Science. There are three specializations for Rotman Commerce students: Accounting, Finance and Economics, or Management. Every student also completes the requirements for a minor in Economics. There are currently 3,200 students enrolled in Rotman Commerce.

Students have the freedom to take any course from the Faculty of Arts and Science, allowing them to include with their specialist, any additional major, or minor. Rotman Commerce has many international study opportunities for students. It has 24 partner universities. Every year, the University of Toronto Summer Abroad Program also offers full-year Rotman Commerce courses in other countries.

=== Rankings ===
The University of Toronto has been previously ranked in the top 25 worldwide in economics faculty, placing 23rd and 18th during the years (1995–99) and (2004–08) respectively. In philosophy, it ranked 15th overall in the English-speaking world and 1st in Canada in the Philosophical Gourmet Report. It ranks among the top 10 in North America for sociology. In the 2010 Academic Ranking of World Universities, the University of Toronto placed first overall in Canada, and ranked 10th worldwide in computer science.

=== Admission statistics ===
For the 2012–2013 entrance year, Arts had an entry average of 86.6% and Science had an entry average of 88.8%. Rotman Commerce, a joint program with the Rotman School of Management, had an entry average of 91.7%. For professional and graduate studies, admission is competitive. For 2011–2012, programs such as public policy and global affairs accept about one-tenth of applicants, though they do not have standardized admissions test requirements. Doctoral-stream master's programs had an acceptance rate of 29.6%, while doctoral programs admitted 21.5% of applicants.

== List of deans ==
The following is a list of deans of the Faculty of Arts and Science.

No.	Picture	Name	Took office	Left office
Dean of the Faculty of Arts (1844–1853; 1901–1960)
1		James Beaven	1844	1853
2		Robert Ramsay Wright	1901	1912
3		Alfred Baker	1912	1919
4		Arthur Philemon Coleman	1919	1922
5		Alfred Tennyson DeLeury	1922	1934
6		Francis Barclay Allan	1934	1936
7		Samuel Beatty	1936	1952
8		Moffat St. Andrew Woodside	1952	1959
Dean of the Faculty of Arts and Science (1960–present)
9		Vincent Bladen	1959	1966
10		Albert Derrick Allen	1966	1972
11		Robert A. Greene	1972	1977
12		Arthur Martin Kruger	1977	1982
13		Robin L. Armstrong	1982	1990
14		Marsha A. Chandler	1990	1997
15		Carl Amrhein	1997	2003
16		Pekka K. Sinervo	2003	2008
17		Meric Gertler	2008	2013
18		David Cameron	2013	2019
19		Melanie Woodin	2019	2025
interim		Stephen Wright	2025	2026
20		Stephen Wright	2026	

== Notable people ==
=== Alumni ===
- Lester B. Pearson (B.A., Victoria College) – Canadian Prime Minister and winner of the Nobel Peace Prize in 1957.
- John Charles Fields (B.A.) – mathematician and the founder of the prestigious Fields Medal.
- Margaret Atwood (B.A., Victoria College) – novelist, poet, literary critic and inventor, author of The Handmaid's Tale.
- Paul Martin (B.A., St. Michael's College) – lawyer and retired politician who served as the 21st prime minister of Canada.
- Harold Innis – professor of political economy, helped develop the staples thesis and the Toronto School of communication theory.
- Edward S. "Ted" Rogers Jr. (B.A., Trinity College) – businessman and philanthropist, founder of Rogers Communications.
- Ilya Sutskever (B.Sc., M.Sc., PhD) – computer scientist; co-inventor of AlexNet and OpenAI; former chief scientist at OpenAI.
- Andrej Karpathy (B.Sc.) – computer scientist; former director of artificial intelligence and Autopilot Vision at Tesla; co-founder of OpenAI.
- William Reeves (Ph.D.) – animator and technical director; one of the founding employees of Pixar.

=== Faculty ===
- Harold Innis (professor of economics, 1920–52) – political economist, co-originator of the Toronto school of communication theory.
- Stephen Cook (professor emeritus of computer science and mathematics, 1970–present) – recipient of the A.M. Turing Award for formalizing the notion of NP-completeness through Cook's theorem, considered one of the forefathers of computational complexity theory.
- Geoffrey Hinton (professor emeritus of computer science, 1987–present) – the "Godfather of AI," Nobel Prize laureate, former researcher at Google, co-founder of the Vector Institute.
- Northrop Frye (professor of English, 1939–91) – influential literary critic and literary theorist
- Raquel Urtasun (professor of computer science, 2014–present) – researcher in the field of artificial intelligence and deep learning, co-founder of the Vector Institute.
- Eric A. Havelock (professor, 1929–47) – classicist and co-originator of the Toronto school of communication theory.
