= Elsie Paul =

Elder of the Tla'amin Nation in British Columbia, Canada

Elsie Paul is an Elder and knowledge keeper of the Tla'amin (Sliammon) Nation, located on the Sunshine Coast of British Columbia, Canada. Paul is a residential school survivor and one of the few living people to speak the Tla'amin language fluently. Paul holds an honorary Doctorate degree from the Vancouver Island University and has co-authored a book, Written as I Remember it: Teachings From the Life of a Sliammon Elder. This work was later released in an open access, multimedia, digital edition. Paul's traditional name is Qazustala's, which translates as, "a welcoming person with a wealth of knowledge, someone who shares her culture".

== Early life ==
Elsie Paul (née Timothy) was born in 1931 in the Tla'amin Nation to parents, Gilbert Francis and Lily Timothy. Paul was later adopted by her maternal grandparents, Jim and Molly Timothy, who raised her in Tla'amin Nation. Elsie survived 2 years of residential school and was then protected by her grandparents who moved her along the coast of British Columbia in order to avoid residential school. Paul's experiences avoiding residential school provided the opportunity to learn the traditional knowledge, skills, language, and customs of the Tla'amin Nation; an uncommon experience for Indigenous children and people at that time. At the age of 18 Elsie Timothy married William Dave Paul and took the last name Paul. Elsie and William Paul had 9 children together, Sharon (deceased), Jane (Deceased) Glen, Jeannie, Walter, Ann, Cathy, Marlane, and Clifford (Deceased) and were married until William's death in 1977.

== Education ==
Paul completed her grade 10 level of schooling as well as upgrading and finally her certification as a Social Worker from the University of British Columbia. She received an Honorary Doctorate degree from Vancouver Island University in 2009, recognizing her longstanding work for her communities.

== Work ==
Before beginning her career as a Social Worker, Elsie travelled the province doing a variety of jobs from working on fish farms, to housekeeping in the hospital, and shucking oysters.

In 1972 Elsie Paul took over the position of Administrator in the Social Services Department in Tla'amin, she worked there for 24 years. She was one of the founders of the Tsow-Tun-Lelum House Treatment Centre, a Healing Lodge specializing in substance abuse, trauma, and support for survivors of residential schools, she served as Justice of the Peace in Victim Support Services and Aboriginal Policing, and she also taught part-time at Malaspina College.

Paul was also elected to her Band Council and served with them until her retirement in 1999.

Elsie Paul wrote an award-winning book Written as I Remember It, with the collaboration of Paige Raibmon and Harmony Johnson. The print book is organized into four threads: Elsie Paul's life history; ʔəms tɑʔɑw (Sliammon for "teachings") related to education, prenatal and neonatal care, grief and spirituality; ʔəms tɑʔɑw related to legends that can serve as guiding stories; and Sliammon-language tales.

In 2019, RavenSpace Publishing released an award-winning Open Access book that builds on the print book: As I Remember It: Teachings (ʔəms tɑʔɑw) from the Life of a Sliammon Elder by Elsie Paul with Davis McKenzie, Paige Raibmon, and Harmony Johnson. This Open Access publication is a new classic of Indigenous Studies, dealing as it does with Colonialism, Territory, Community and Wellness. As an Indigenous publication, it introduced digital protocols related to cultural use and protections, including the use of Traditional Knowledge labels.

== Language ==
Elsie Paul is one of the few fluent speakers of the Tla'amin language, a language that has been identified as a Central Salish branch of Coast Salish languages. Paul has worked to help develop the Tla'amin language curriculum that is now used in School District 47 (Powell River and Texada Island, British Columbia, Canada). Paul also worked with the Tla'amin Cultural Department to aid in developing a language program for her community as well as the FirstVoices database, where Indigenous languages are recorded, archived, and revived.

As a First Speaker of the Tla'amin language (in linguistics it is referred to as Sliammon), Elsie Paul contributed to the linguistic work of scholars, including Honore Tanabe the author of the Sliammon . Elsie Paul speaks of the difficulty in this linguistic work and sings traditional Tla'amin songs.

== Awards ==
- In 2024, the American Council of Learned Societies awarded Elsie Paul the inaugural ACLS Open Access Book Prize for the born-digital book As I Remember It; Teachings from the Life of a Sliammon Elder.
- In 2017 the City of Powell River granted Elsie Paul the Freedom of the City and commended her for her "Unfailing grace and steadfast and kind demeanour".
- Written as I Remember it: Teachings from the Life of a Sliammon Elder (a book co-authored by Elsie Paul) won the following awards: 2015, Winner - Aboriginal History Book Prize, Canadian Historical Association 2015, Winner - Armitage-Jameson Book Prize, Coalition for Western Women's History 2015, Commended - BCHF Historical Writing Awards, British Columbia Historical Federation.
- Honorary Doctorate in 2010 from Vancouver Island University.
