= James M. Harrison =

Canadian geologist

Dr. James Merritt Harrison
- Born: September 20, 1915; Regina, Saskatchewan
- Died: July 6, 1990 (aged 74); Canada
- Citizenship: Canadian
- Education: University of Manitoba; Queen's University
- Known for: Founding the Union of Geological Sciences
- Awards: Order of Canada; Logan Medal (1969)
- Scientific career
- Fields: Geology
- Workplaces: Geological Survey of Canada; Canadian Federal Department of Energy, Mines and Resources

James Merritt Harrison, CC (September 20, 1915 – July 6, 1990) was a Canadian scientist and public servant. He was the Director of the Geological Survey of Canada from 1956 to 1964, and Assistant Deputy Minister of the Department of Energy, Mines and Resources.

== Biography ==
Born in Regina, Saskatchewan, he obtained his B.Sc. from the University of Manitoba in 1935. He received his M.A. in 1941 and Ph.D. in 1943 from Queen's University.

He was one of the founders of the Union of Geological Sciences (IUGS) and was its first President from 1961 to 1964. Between 1966 and 1968, he was President of the International Council for Science (ICSU).

In 1969, Harrison was awarded the Logan Medal, the Geological Association of Canada's highest honour.

From January 1973 to March 1976, he was the Assistant Director-General for Natural Sciences at the United Nations Educational, Scientific and Cultural Organization in Paris.

In 1971, he was made a Companion of the Order of Canada.

== Tales of the Geological Survey of Canada ==
In 1988, Harrison recorded some anecdotes and reminiscences of his time at the Geological Survey of Canada, and of some of the people who had worked there, including Joseph Tyrrell, Morley E. Wilson and Alice Wilson. These recordings were later transcribed.

== Sources ==
- Canadian Mining Hall of Fame citation
- James Merritt Harrison Obituary

Professional and academic associations
Preceded by Gerhard Herzberg	President of the Royal Society of Canada; 1967–1968	Succeeded by Léon Lortie
