= Gerhard Herzberg =

German-Canadian physicist and physical chemist (1904–1999)

The Honourable Gerhard Herzberg PC CC FRSC FRS
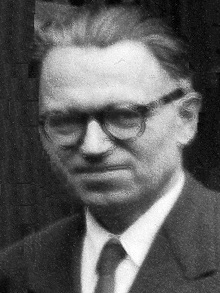
- Herzberg in 1952
- Born: Gerhard Heinrich Friedrich Otto Julius Herzberg; December 25, 1904; Hamburg, Germany
- Died: March 3, 1999 (aged 94); Ottawa, Ontario, Canada
- Citizenship: Canadian
- Education: Technische Universität Darmstadt
- Awards: Henry Marshall Tory Medal (1953); Centenary Prize (1958); Bakerian Medal (1960); Frederic Ives Medal (1964); Willard Gibbs Award (1969); Faraday Lectureship Prize (1970); Linus Pauling Award (1971); Nobel Prize for Chemistry (1971); Chemical Institute of Canada Medal (1972); Royal Medal (1971) (1972); Watts Lecture (1974); Earle K. Plyler Prize (1985)
- Scientific career
- Fields: Physical chemist
- Workplaces: Carleton University, National Research Council of Canada, University of Saskatchewan, University of Chicago
- Doctoral advisor: Hans Rau
- Doctoral students: Takeshi Oka

Gerhard Heinrich Friedrich Otto Julius Herzberg, PC CC FRSC FRS (German: [ˈɡeːɐ̯.haʁt ˈhɛʁt͡sˌbɛʁk]; December 25, 1904 – March 3, 1999) was a German-Canadian pioneering physicist and physical chemist, who won the Nobel Prize for Chemistry in 1971, "for his contributions to the knowledge of electronic structure and geometry of molecules, particularly free radicals". Herzberg's main work concerned atomic and molecular spectroscopy. He is well known for using these techniques that determine the structures of diatomic and polyatomic molecules, including free radicals which are difficult to investigate in any other way, and for the chemical analysis of astronomical objects. Herzberg served as Chancellor of Carleton University in Ottawa, Canada from 1973 to 1980.

== Early life and family ==
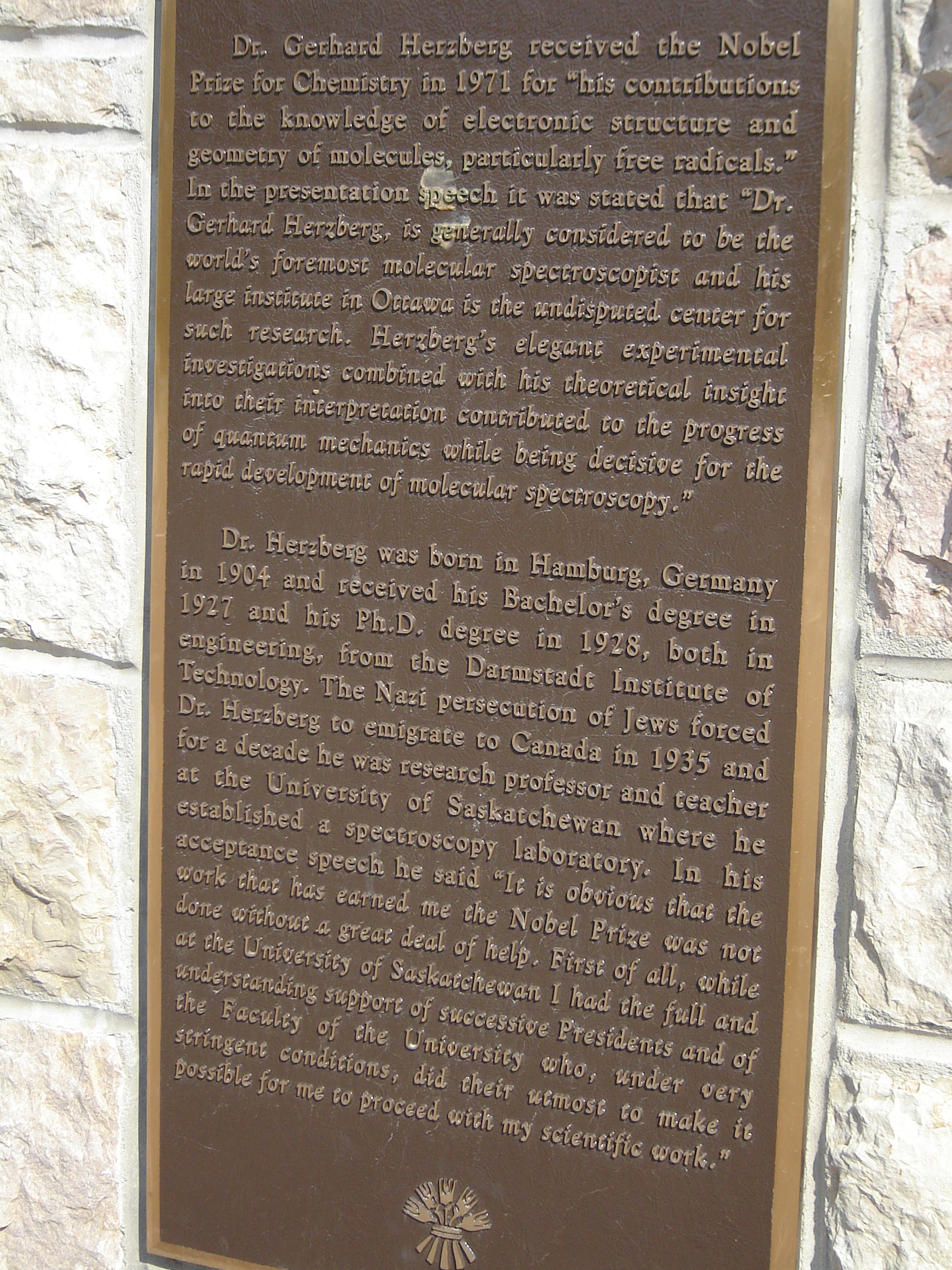
Commemorative plaque at College Building, University of Saskatchewan

Herzberg was born in Hamburg, Germany on December 25, 1904, to Albin H. Herzberg and Ella Biber. He had an older brother, Walter, who was born in January 1904. Herzberg started Vorschule (pre-school) late, after contracting measles. Gerhard and his family were atheists and kept this fact hidden. His father died in 1914, at 43 years of age, after having suffered from dropsy and complications due to an earlier heart condition. Herzberg graduated Vorschule shortly after his father's death. He married Luise Herzberg (née Oettinger), a spectroscopist and fellow researcher in 1929. (Luise Herzberg, died in 1971.)

== Nazi persecution and immigration to Canada ==
In 1933, the Nazi Party introduced a law banning men with Jewish wives from teaching at universities. Herzberg was working as a lecturer at the university in Darmstadt. His wife and fellow researcher, Luise Herzberg, was Jewish so they began making plans to leave Germany near the end of 1933. Leaving Germany was a daunting task as many barriers faced the thousands of Germans trying to flee Nazi persecution. However Herzberg had earlier worked with a visiting physical chemist named John Spinks, from the University of Saskatchewan. Spinks helped Herzberg get a job at the university in Saskatoon. When Herzberg and his wife left Germany in 1935, the Nazis let them take only the equivalent of $2.50 each and personal belongings.

== Education and career ==
Initially, Herzberg considered a career in astronomy, but his application to the Hamburg Observatory was returned advising him not to pursue a career in the field without private financial support. After completing high school at the Gelehrtenschule des Johanneums, Herzberg continued his education at Darmstadt University of Technology with the help of a private scholarship. Herzberg completed his Dr.-Ing. degree under Hans Rau in 1928.

- 1928–30 Post-doctoral work at the University of Göttingen and Bristol University under James Franck, Max Born, John Lennard-Jones
- 1930 Darmstadt University of Technology: Privatdozent (lecturer) and senior assistant in Physics
- 1935 Guest professor, University of Saskatchewan (Saskatoon, Canada)
- 1936–45 Professor of Physics, University of Saskatchewan
- 1939 Fellow of the Royal Society of Canada
- 1945–8 Professor of spectroscopy, Yerkes Observatory, University of Chicago (Chicago, United States)
- 1948 Director of the Division of Pure Physics, National Research Council of Canada
- 1951 Fellow of the Royal Society of London
- 1957–63 Vice President of the International Union of Pure and Applied Physics
- 1956–7 President of the Canadian Association of Physicists
- 1960 gives Bakerian Lecturer of the Royal Society of London
- 1965 Member of the American Academy of Arts and Sciences
- 1966–7 President of the Royal Society of Canada
- 1968 Member of the United States National Academy of Sciences
- 1968 Companion of the Order of Canada
- 1968 George Fisher Baker Non-Resident Lecturer in Chemistry at Cornell University (Ithaca, United States)
- 1969 Willard Gibbs Award
- 1969 Distinguished Research Scientist in the recombined Division of Physics, at the National Research Council of Canada
- 1970 Lecturer of the Chemical Society of London, receives Faraday Medal
- 1971 Nobel Prize in Chemistry "for his contributions to the knowledge of electronic structure and geometry of molecules, particularly free radicals"
- 1971 Royal Medal from Royal Society of London
- 1972 Member of the American Philosophical Society
- 1973-1980 Chancellor of Carleton University (Ottawa, Ontario, Canada)
- 1981 Founding member of the World Cultural Council.
- 1992 Sworn into the Queen's Privy Council for Canada
- 1999 Died aged 94

== Honours and awards ==
Herzberg's most significant award was the 1971 Nobel Prize in Chemistry, which he was awarded "for his contributions to the knowledge of electronic structure and geometry of molecules, particularly free radicals". During the presentation speech, it was noted that at the time of the award, Herzberg was "generally considered to be the world's foremost molecular spectroscopist."

Herzberg was honoured with memberships or fellowships by a very large number of scientific societies, received many awards and honorary degrees in different countries. The NSERC Gerhard Herzberg Canada Gold Medal for Science and Engineering, Canada's highest research award, was named in his honour in 2000. The Canadian Association of Physicists also has an annual award named in his honour. The Herzberg Institute of Astrophysics is named for him. He was made a member of the International Academy of Quantum Molecular Science. Asteroid 3316 Herzberg is named after him. In 1964 he was awarded the Frederic Ives Medal by the OSA. He was later named an Honorary Member of the Society. At Carleton University, there is a building named after him that belongs to the Physics and Mathematics/Statistics Departments, Herzberg Laboratories. Herzberg was elected a Fellow of the Royal Society (FRS) in 1951.

The main building of John Abbott College in Montreal is named after him. Carleton University named the Herzberg Laboratories building after him. A public park in the College Park neighbourhood of Saskatoon also bears his name.

== Books and publications ==
Herzberg authored some classic works in the field of spectroscopy, including Atomic Spectra and Atomic Structure and the encyclopaedic four volume work: Molecular Spectra and Molecular Structure, which is often called the spectroscopist's bible. The three volumes of Molecular Spectra and Molecular Structure were re-issued by Krieger in 1989, including extensive new footnotes by Herzberg. Volume IV of the series, "Constants of diatomic molecules" is purely a reference work, a compendium of known spectroscopic constants (and therefore a bibliography of molecular spectroscopy) of diatomic molecules up until 1978.

- Atomic Spectra and Atomic Structure. (Dover Books, New York, 2010, ISBN 0-486-60115-3)
- The spectra and structures of simple free radicals: An introduction to molecular spectroscopy. (Dover Books, New York, 1971, ISBN 0-486-65821-X).
- Molecular Spectra and Molecular Structure: I. Spectra of Diatomic Molecules. (Krieger, 1989, ISBN 0-89464-268-5)
- Molecular Spectra and Molecular Structure: II. Infrared and Raman Spectra of Polyatomic Molecules. (Krieger, 1989, ISBN 0-89464-269-3)
- Molecular Spectra and Molecular Structure: III. Electronic Spectra and Electronic Structure of Polyatomic Molecules. (Krieger, 1989, ISBN 0-89464-270-7)
- Molecular Spectra and Molecular Structure IV. Constants of Diatomic Molecules, K. P. Huber and G. Herzberg, (Van nostrand Reinhold company, New York, 1979, ISBN 0-442-23394-9).

== Archives ==
There are Gerhard Herzberg fonds at Library and Archives Canada and at National Research Council Canada.

== See also ==
- Herzberg bands
- Collision-induced absorption and emission
- Methylene (compound)
- Pseudo Jahn–Teller effect
- Triatomic hydrogen
- Vibronic coupling
- List of German Canadians

Professional and academic associations
Preceded by William Kaye Lamb	President of the Royal Society of Canada; 1966–1967	Succeeded by James M. Harrison
