= Bioelectromagnetics =

Study of electromagnetic fields and biological entity interaction

Bioelectromagnetics, also known as bioelectromagnetism, is a branch of science studying the interaction between electromagnetic fields and biological entities. Areas of study include electromagnetic fields produced by living cells, tissues or organisms, the effects of man-made sources of electromagnetic fields like mobile phones, and the application of electromagnetic radiation toward therapies for the treatment of various conditions.

== History ==
=== Western ===
From WW2 until around the 1980s, the study of non-ionizing radiation in biological systems was considered a subset of radiobiology, or simply referred to as "effects" or "bioeffects" of a particular frequency band. The term "bioelectromagnetics" was coined by Thomas C. Rozzell of the Office of Naval Research.

As the program manager for BEM at ONR [Office of Naval Research] for 12 years prior to coming to ONRL [Office of Naval Research London], I naturally concentrated my attention in this area.

BEM [BioElectroMagnetics] is a relatively new research area and one which I am proud to have helped shape in my position at ONR. In fact, I coined the name for this research area in 1978. ONR, and indeed the Navy and the DoD, can be proud of their contributions to BEM research in the US and throughout the world.

A multdisciplinary area, BEM encompasses biology from micro to macro, physiology, psychology, immunology, biophysics, physics, engineering, etc. Though the area is new in terms of organization, BEM may actually be traced back almost 100 years. The patron scientific saint of the field is now accepted to be Arsene d'Arsonval of France, whose research on electrophysiological activity of muscles and nerves in the last quarter of the 19th century led him to explore the effects of low and high-frequency currents, which led, in turn, to his development of radiofrequency generators and applicators for use in the clinic. This modality is known now as "diathermy" but earlier was known as "d'Arsonvalisation." The physician d'Arsonval was the first to use field-induced hyperthermia in the treatment of cancer (Justesen and Guy, 1985).

Much of the research in BEM over the past two decades has been driven by an intense desire to determine the nature and degree of biological hazard posed by exposure to electromagnetic (EM) fields. By far the largest majority of the research has been concentrated in the frequency range of about 300 MHz to 100 GHz, the so-called microwave portion of the electromagnetic spectrum (see Figure 1). In the US, the DoD is probably the largest single user of EM energy in the form of radar or radio waves. It is this use that has caused the DoD to spend large sums on research designed to answer questions regarding the hazards to personnel due to working in the environments of EM fields. Microwaves, generated in great abundance by radar equipment, have been the "mother ship" of the BEM research community, with at least 80 percent of the research centered around one frequency--2450 MHz. That this came about was due primarily to the availability of equipment, for one thing, and the early assumption that extrapolations could be made to other frequencies if certain parameters were adjusted.

The primary effect of the interaction of EM fields, and especially microwaves, and biological systems is the production of heat. The energy of the fields is absorbed by the target system resulting in molecular motion. The EM energy in this part of the spectrum does not cause ionization of atoms as x-rays and gamma rays do. For this reason, it was felt for a long time that in the absence of heat there was no hazard from short-term exposure. It is now generally accepted that this is not so, that there are field-specific effects that can occur at levels that do not produce heat. In the past 5 to 7 years, the most exciting research has been conducted in this area. It is here that the quest continues for the elusive interactive mechanisms that are responsible for effects at the level of the cell membrane and intra-cellular components. Early studies generally concentrated on the organism and looked for phenomena such as changes in behavior, or in growth and development. Now the search has turned to the cell and to macromolecules. Such scientific probing calls for a substantial increase in the precision of measurement of biological responses.

The quest for adverse biological effects has paid dividends in ways not originally anticipated. As more was learned about the responses of biological systems, it was found that some of the responses were not detrimental but were indeed beneficial. On even closer examination, it was found that almost all living systems have bioelectric components, such as nerve activity or muscle conduction, and that many such as birds and other species, use EM information for navigation. We now can use EM energy in an ever-increasing number of diagnostic and therapeutic modalities. Witness such techniques as nuclear magnetic resonance (NMR), bone healing by EM field stimulation, cancer treatment by hyperthermia, and microwave imaging, among others (Rozzell and Lin in press).

With the realization that extremely low levels of EK energy are capable of eliciting a response from a biological system, attention is now being turned to further understanding of exactly how and where such sensitive receptors reside and how they react in the presence of such weak fields as those generated by the Earth or other natural and synthetic sources.

Cook et al reviewed the early use and study of electricity and EMR.

Background, 1885-1940: early work on short-waves and therapy

Interest among researchers in the effect of electricity on biological systems arose almost as soon as electricity could be generated in a controlled form. This same interest rapidly shifted to research on the biological effects of electromagnetic radiation when, during the years 1885-1889, Heinrich Rudolf Hertz demonstrated a technique for propagating electromagnetic energy through space. Typical of this shift is the Parisian scientist, Arsene d'Arsonval. Prior to the late 1880s, d'Arsonval had devoted considerable time to the investigation of the physiological effects of electrocution. Shortly after learning about the new Hertzian apparatus, d'Arsonval developed his own equipment, which produced 10^4 - 10^5 cm waves at power levels nearing 20 amp, and turned his attention to its possible physiological and medical uses. By 1893, he was publishing papers on the influence of radio waves on cells.

In 1911 Knight Dunlap et al at Johns Hopkins University published a replication of Thompson's earlier report of flickering lights in the visual fields when the head was placed in the field of a coil supplied by AC.

The experiments reported by S. P. Thompson in the Proceedings of the Royal Society, B, 82 (557), pp. 396 ff., are of great importance, especially in view of the negative results which have been obtained in the several earlier attempts to arouse sensations by subjecting the head to the influence of a magnetic field. Previous experimenters seem, however, to have used direct current, while Thompson used alternating current.

=== Eastern Europe and USSR ===
Following the Moscow Signal, the initiation of ARPA's Project Pandora, and other key events, public sector funding and interest in the Soviet work in this area increased greatly. Translations of Soviet journals were published regularly by the JPRS. An international symposium was held in Warsaw, 1973, sponsored by the WHO, United States Department of Health, Education, and Welfare, and Ministry of Health (Poland).

Symposium held at Virginia Commonwealth University, 1969. Titled: Biological Effects and Health Implications of Microwave Radiation.

Page 140: Dodge - CLINICAL AND HYGIENIC ASPECTS OF EXPOSURE TO ELECTROMAGNETIC FIELDS (A Review of the Soviet and Eastern European Literature)

As early as 1933, certain Soviet scientists had already recognized that electromagnetic fields affected the human nervous system. In 1937, Turlygin published one of the first comprehensive Soviet accounts of the effects of centimeter waves on the human central nervous system. He found that CNS excitability was increased by 100% of the control level when a crude spark oscillator in the vicinity of the head of a subject was switched on. In a lengthy review article, Livshits cited no fewer than 28 Soviet publications on the general subject of clinical and biological microwave effects which had been published by the end of the 1930's.

During the 1940's and early 1950's, there was an understandable lull in research on this subject due to World War II. By the middle and late 1950's, there appeared a veritable deluge of Soviet literature dealing, in the main, with the clinical and hygienic aspects of microwave exposure which has continued unabated to this day. By the early 1960's, the Eastern European countries of Czechoslovakia and Poland had also become extremely active in the area of microwave exposure effects.

At the 1973 Warsaw symposium, titled "Biologic Effects and Health Hazards of Microwave Radiation", ZV Gordon et al summarized Soviet work, methods, and thinking in the field.

Page 22: Gordon - Main directions and results of research conducted in the USSR on the biologic effects of microwaves

We used an experimental model of intermittent irradiation based on actual regimes of irradiation accompanying production. We found that, according to a number of indicators (fluctuations in weight and blood pressure, electroencephalography and electromyography, neurosecretory activity of hypothalamic nuclei), intermittent exposure to irradiation results in more pronounced biologic effects than those of steady irradiation under conditions of equal strength and time parameters. One could hypothesize that intermittent exposure, is much more strenuous for the adaptation and compensation mechanisms owing to the frequent changes in the irradiation parameters.

Without dwelling upon the clinical direction of research, to which a separate paper by Dr. M. N. Sadcikova is devoted, we will only note that clinico-hygienic correlations made it possible to link the clinical indicators with intensity of microwave irradiation under industrial conditions. This unique material accumulated as a result of 20 years' observations made it possible to establish a very important fact, namely, that the biologic effects become more severe with increasing duration of work accompanied by irradiation of low intensities (less than 1 mW/cm^2).

Before going into experimental research, it is necessary to define certain terms which are frequently treated ambiguously. These are thermal and non-thermal effects. Thermal effects are those biologic suquelae which are due to integral rise of temperature of the body and its separate parts during whole body or local irradiation.

Thermal effects are those biologic sequelae which are due to integral rise are the result of uneven heating of microstructures of a heterogeneous biologic tissue and may occur in the absence of the integral thermal effect. Finally, non-thermal or "extrathermal" effects are due to conversion of electromagnetic energy within an object into another form of non-thermal energy (molecular resonance absorption, photochemical reaction, etc.).

The present lack of adequate methods for separating nonthermal from thermoselective effects is the sole reason for their being put together under the provisional name of "non-thermal" effects.

The occurrence of pronounced biologic effects of microwaves of intensities which do not evoke the integral heat effect (less than 10 mW/cm2) has been convincingly shown independently by a number of Soviet and foreign authors. Although there are differences of opinion on the "non-thermal" or "microthermal" nature of the biologic effects of low levels of energy, there should be no doubt at present as to the actual existence of these effects. [...] However, irradiation that is lower in intensity by one order of magnitude (1 mW/cm2) is also significant from the medical point of view according to a number of indicators. Upon cessation of irradiation some of its sequelae may disappear but a prolonged action results in destructive, irreversible pathologic lesions. Attention is drawn to the fact that, as can be seen in Table 2, even at intensities that are extremely low by comparison with those considered above (e.g., 500-250 uW/cm2), certain biologic effects occur (bioelectric phenomena with resetting to a new level of activity of the brain systems, changes in immunobiologic resistance), including definite pathologic effects (reproductive functions).

D. I. McRee of the National Institute of Environmental Health Sciences published a similar review in 1980, covering joint US-Soviet projects to reconcile difference in results.

The overview of the Soviet and Eastern European literature indicate a large number of bioeffects at exposure levels below 10 mW/cm2. A significant number of biological changes were reported below 1 mW/cm2. Most of their papers do not give details concerning the experimental design and exposure techniques. Because of these unknowns, a strong motivation to ignore much of the Soviet and Eastern European results exists in the U.S. In order to discourage this understandable tendency, an example from the U.S.-USSR program on the biological effects of microwave radiation will be used.

In the early stages of this program, the cooperation mainly consisted of an exchange of results on projects related to the central nervous system and behavior. The U.S. research included in the cooperation consisted primarily of acute experiments with exposure levels generally of 5 mW/cm2 and above while the Soviet experiments were long-term low-level experiments at 500pW/cm2 and below. At the end of the first year of the cooperation, the Soviets reported changes in bioelectric brain activity at 10, 50, and 500uW/cm2 in rats and rabbits exposed for 7 h/day for 30 days to 2375-MHz CW radiation. Levels of 10 and 50uW/cm2 stimulated brain activity while 500uW/cm2 suppressed activity as seen from an increase of slow high-amplitude delta wave in rabbits. At a 500uW/cm2 decrease in capacity for work, in investigative activity, and sensitivity to electric shock threshold in rats were reported. Research by the U.S. investigators on rats exposed to 5 mW/cm2 for shorter durations of exposure to 2450-MHz CW radiation showed no statistical difference in EEG, no change in locomotion activity in a residential maze, and no change in performance on a fixed-ratio schedule of reinforcement below 5 mW/cm2 (0.5 and 1.0 mW/cm2) but a trend toward decrease in performance at 5 mW/cm2 and a large decrease in performance at 10 and 20 mW/cm2.

It became obvious that, except for our being more familiar with Soviet experimental design, we were no closer to understanding differences between the U.S. and USSR results. It was then decided to perform a duplicate experiment in order to determine if similar effects could be observed. Rats were exposed from above for 7 h/day, 7 days/week for 3 months to 500uW/cm2. Dr. Richard Lovely of the University of Washington, project leader on the duplicate project, spent 4 weeks in the Soviet Union to observe the behavioral and biochemical tests being performed on the animals. The results of these duplicate investigations are very interesting. The U.S. study found a drop in sulfhydryl activity and blood cholinesterase as was reported in the Soviet study. Blood chemistry at the termination of 3 months exposure indicated that the exposed animals, relative to controls, suffered from aldosteronism. The latter interpretation of the high sodium-low-potassium levels found in the blood was confirmed by necropsy and histopathology of the adrenal glands, revealing that the zona glornerulosa was vacuolated and hypertrophied. In addition all behavioral parameters assessed at the end of 3-month exposures revealed significant differences between groups in the same direction as those reported in the Soviet study, i.e., increased threshold to footshock detection, decreased activity in an openfield, and poorer retention of an avoidance response when reassessed following conditioning. This replication of the Soviet results at 500uW/cm2 emphasizes the need for performing long-term low-level microwave bioeffects research by U.S. investigators and the necessity of evaluating seriously the results of Soviet and Eastern European research before it is considered invalid. These experiments should also be replicated by independent investigators in the U.S. since the health implications of the above effects could be serious.

== Biological phenomena ==
Interactions of organisms with electromagnetic fields from across the electromagnetic spectrum are part of bioelectromagnetic studies.

Bioelectromagnetism is studied primarily through the techniques of electrophysiology. In the late eighteenth century, the Italian physician and physicist Luigi Galvani first recorded the phenomenon while dissecting a frog at a table where he had been conducting experiments with static electricity. Galvani coined the term animal electricity to describe the phenomenon, while contemporaries labeled it galvanism. Galvani and contemporaries regarded muscle activation as resulting from an electrical fluid or substance in the nerves. Short-lived electrical events called action potentials occur in several types of animal cells which are called excitable cells, a category of cell including neurons, muscle cells, and endocrine cells, as well as in some plant cells. These action potentials are used to facilitate inter-cellular communication and activate intracellular processes. The physiological phenomena of action potentials are possible because voltage-gated ion channels allow the resting potential caused by electrochemical gradient on either side of a cell membrane to resolve..

Several animals are suspected to have the ability to sense electromagnetic fields; for example, several aquatic animals have structures potentially capable of sensing changes in voltage caused by a changing magnetic field, while migratory birds are thought to use magnetoreception in navigation.

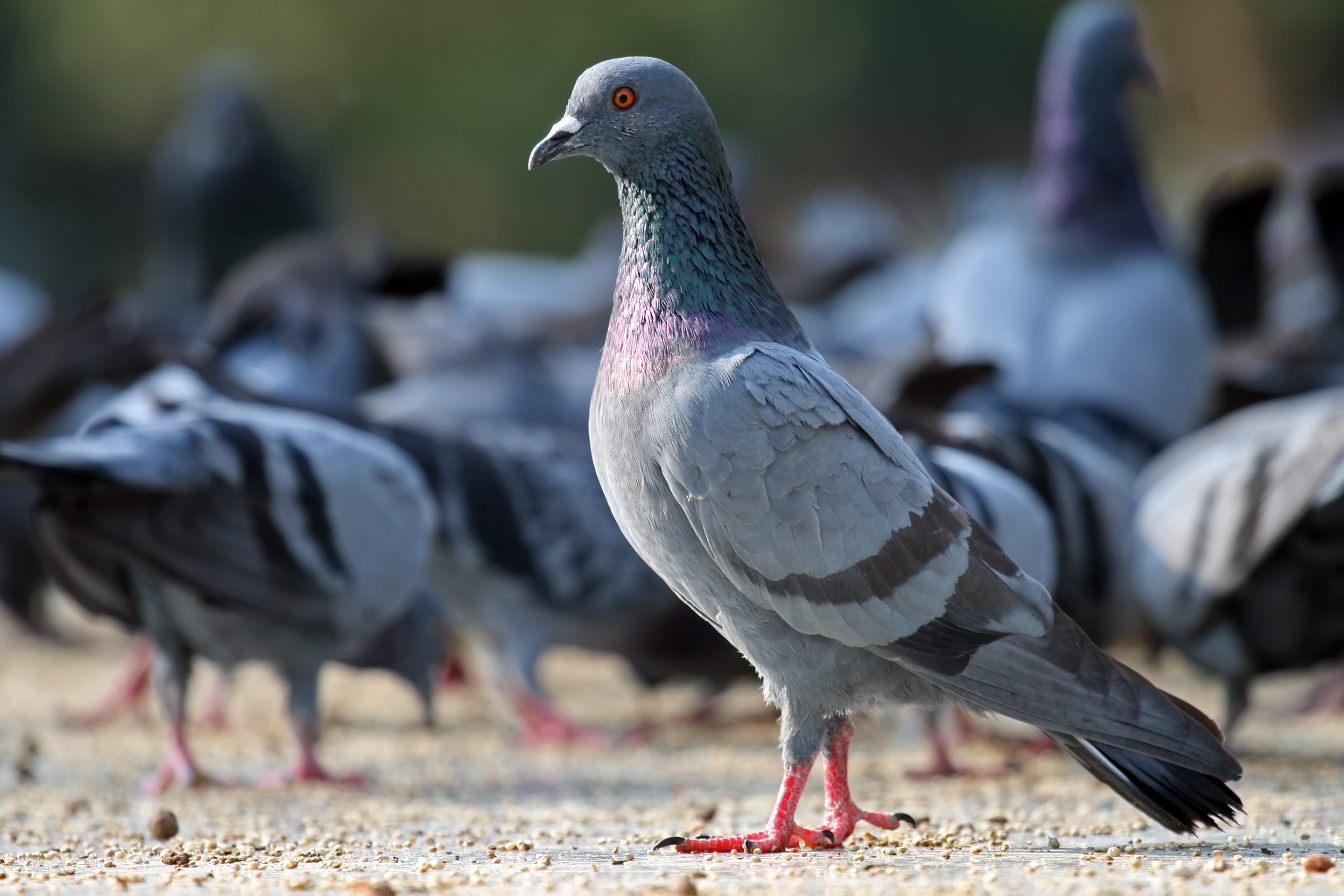
Pigeons and other migratory birds are thought to use a sense of the Earth's magnetic field in navigation.

== Bioeffects of electromagnetic radiation ==
Most of the molecules in the human body interact weakly with electromagnetic fields in the radio frequency or extremely low frequency bands. One such interaction is absorption of energy from the fields, which can cause tissue to heat up; more intense fields will produce greater heating. This can lead to biological effects ranging from muscle relaxation (as produced by a diathermy device) to burns. Many nations and regulatory bodies like the International Commission on Non-Ionizing Radiation Protection have established safety guidelines to limit EMF exposure to a non-thermal level. This can be defined as either heating only to the point where the excess heat can be dissipated, or as a fixed increase in temperature not detectable with current instruments like 0.1 °C. However, biological effects have been shown to be present for these non-thermal exposures; Various mechanisms have been proposed to explain these, and there may be several mechanisms underlying the differing phenomena observed.

Many behavioral effects at different intensities have been reported from exposure to magnetic fields, particularly with pulsed magnetic fields. The specific pulseform used appears to be an important factor for the behavioural effect seen; for example, a pulsed magnetic field originally designed for spectroscopic MRI, referred to as Low Field Magnetic Stimulation, was found to temporarily improve patient-reported mood in bipolar patients, while another MRI pulse had no effect. A whole-body exposure to a pulsed magnetic field was found to alter standing balance and pain perception in other studies.

A strong changing magnetic field can induce electrical currents in conductive tissue such as the brain. Since the magnetic field penetrates tissue, it can be generated outside of the head to induce currents within, causing transcranial magnetic stimulation (TMS). These currents depolarize neurons in a selected part of the brain, leading to changes in the patterns of neural activity. In repeated pulse TMS therapy or rTMS, the presence of incompatible EEG electrodes can result in electrode heating and, in severe cases, skin burns. A number of scientists and clinicians are attempting to use TMS to replace electroconvulsive therapy (ECT) to treat disorders such as severe depression and hallucinations. Instead of one strong electric shock through the head as in ECT, a large number of relatively weak pulses are delivered in TMS therapy, typically at the rate of about 10 pulses per second. If very strong pulses at a rapid rate are delivered to the brain, the induced currents can cause convulsions much like in the original electroconvulsive therapy. Sometimes, this is done deliberately in order to treat depression, such as in ECT.

== Effects of electromagnetic radiation on human health ==
While health effects from extremely low frequency (ELF) electric and magnetic fields (0 to 300 Hz) generated by power lines, and radio/microwave frequencies (RF) (10 MHz - 300 GHz) emitted by radio antennas and wireless networks have been well studied, the intermediate range (300 Hz to 10 MHz) has been studied far less. Direct effects of low power radiofrequency electromagnetism on human health have been difficult to prove, and documented life-threatening effects from radiofrequency electromagnetic fields are limited to high power sources capable of causing significant thermal effects and medical devices such as pacemakers and other electronic implants. However, many studies have been conducted with electromagnetic fields to investigate their effects on cell metabolism, apoptosis, and tumor growth.

Electromagnetic radiation in the intermediate frequency range has found a place in modern medical practice for the treatment of bone healing and for nerve stimulation and regeneration. It is also approved in the some nations as cancer therapy for the treatment of glioblastoma and malignant plural mesothelioma in the form of tumor treating fields, which uses alternating electric fields in the frequency range of 100–300 kHz. However, the efficacy of this method remains contentious among medical experts. Since some of these methods involve magnetic fields that invoke electric currents in biological tissues and others only involve electric fields, these methods are technically electrotherapies, though their applications with modern electronic equipment place them in the category of bioelectromagnetic interactions.

== See also ==
- Bioelectrogenesis
- Biomagnetism
- Bioelectricity
- Bioelectrochemistry
- Bioelectrodynamics
- Biophotonics
- Biophysics
- Electric fish
- Electrical brain stimulation
- Electroencephalography
- Electromagnetic radiation and health
- Electromyography
- Electrotaxis
- Kirlian photography
- Magnetobiology
- Magnetoception
- Magnetoelectrochemistry
- Mobile phone radiation and health
- Radiobiology
- Specific absorption rate
- Transcutaneous electrical nerve stimulation
