= Marc-Adélard Tremblay =

Canadian anthropologist (1922–2014)

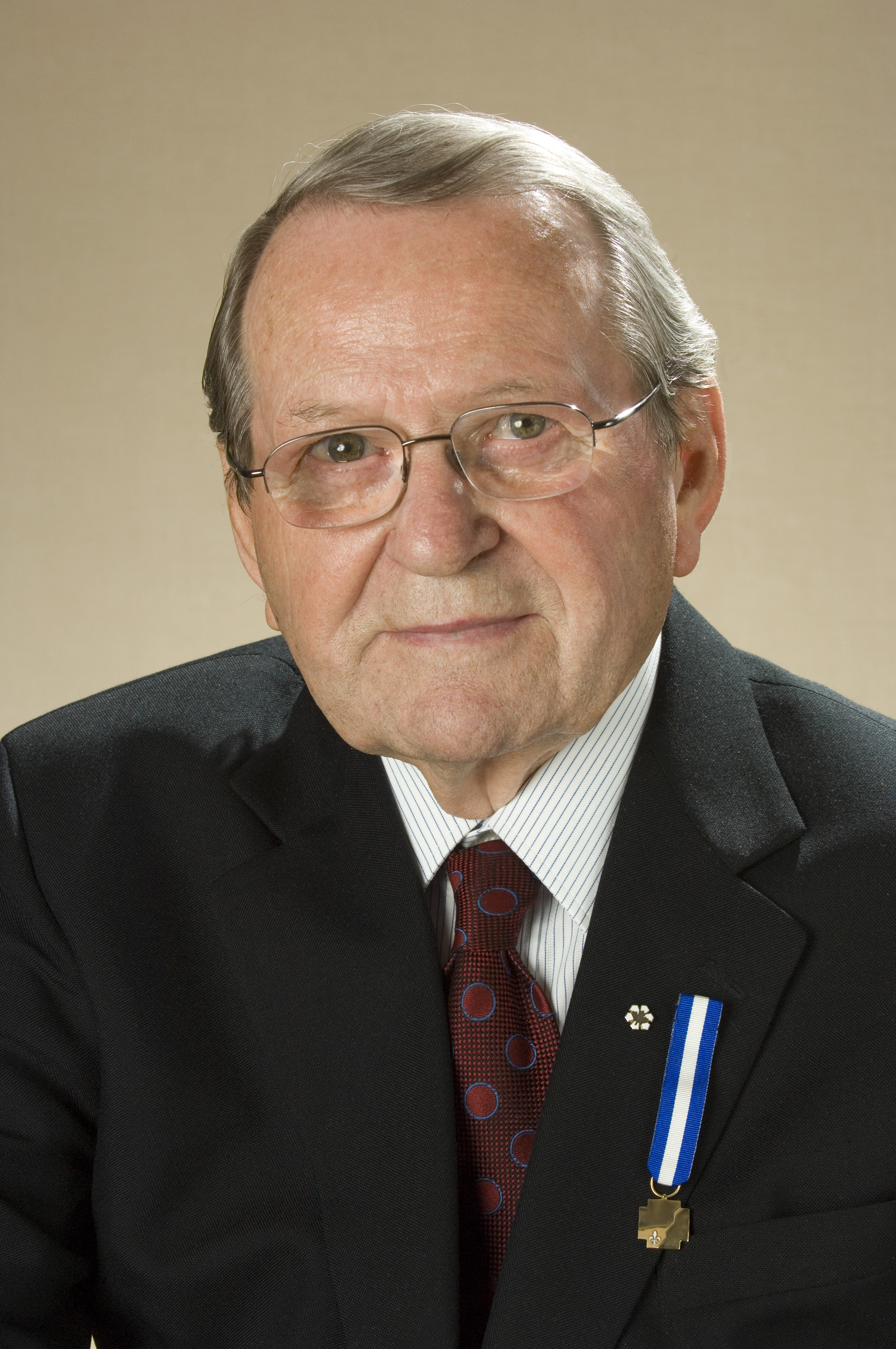
- Born: April 24, 1922; Les Éboulements, Quebec
- Died: March 20, 2014 (aged 91); Quebec, Quebec
- Occupation: Anthropologist
- Title: President of the Royal Society of Canada
- Term: 1981-1984
- Predecessor: Robert Edward Bell
- Successor: Alexander Gordon McKay
- Awards: Order of Canada; National Order of Quebec

Marc-Adélard Tremblay, OC GOQ MSRC (24 April 1922 – 20 March 2014) was a Canadian anthropologist.

Born in Les Éboulements, Quebec, he was educated at Université de Montréal, Université Laval, and Cornell University.

He was a Professor of Anthropology at the Université Laval and was Dean of the Graduate School from 1971 to 1979. From 1981 to 1984, he was the President of the Royal Society of Canada. He was the founding president of the Association of Canadian Universities for Northern Studies (ACUNS).

In 1980, he was made an Officer of the Order of Canada "in recognition of his important contribution to social anthropology through his research, his many writings and his commitment to community enterprises, to which he has lent his considerable expertise". In 1995, he was made a Grand Officer of the National Order of Quebec.

Professional and academic associations
Preceded by Robert E. Bell	President of the Royal Society of Canada; 1978–1981	Succeeded by Alexander G. McKay
