= Robert Edward Bell =

Canadian nuclear physicist and principal of McGill University

Robert Edward Bell CC FRS FRSC

12th Principal of McGill University
- In office 1970–1979
- Preceded by: Rocke Robertson
- Succeeded by: David Johnston

Personal details
- Born: November 29, 1918 New Malden, England
- Died: April 1, 1992 (aged 73) Vancouver, British Columbia
- Education: University of British Columbia; McGill University
- Profession: Nuclear physicist

Robert Edward Bell CC FRS FRSC (November 29, 1918 – April 1, 1992) was a Canadian nuclear physicist and principal of McGill University from 1970 to 1979.

== Biography ==
Born in New Malden, England to Canadian parents, he was raised in Ladner, British Columbia. He received a Bachelor of Arts in mathematics and physics in 1939 and a M.A. in physics in 1941 from the University of British Columbia. During World War II he researched VHF, UHF radar and microwave antennas for military purposes at the National Research Council Laboratories in Ottawa. After the war, from 1946 to 1952, he worked at the Chalk River Nuclear Energy Laboratory in Ontario in nuclear physics research and received a PhD degree in physics from McGill University in 1948.

Between 1956 and 1960 he was an associate professor at McGill University. From 1958 to 1959 he worked in Copenhagen, Denmark at the Niels Bohr Institute. In 1960 he was named Rutherford Professor of Physics and Director of the Foster Radiation Laboratory at McGill. Between 1964 and 1967 he was Vice-Dean for Physical Sciences. In 1969 he became Dean of Graduate Studies and Research and in 1970 he was appointed Principal and Vice-Chancellor. In 1979 he returned to the Physics Department leaving McGill in 1983. From 1978 until 1981, he was president of the Royal Society of Canada. From 1981 to 1990 he was a Canadian delegate to the science council of NATO.

== Honours ==
- In 1954 he was elected a Fellow of the American Physical Society
- In 1955 he was made a Fellow of the Royal Society of Canada.
- In 1965 he was named a Fellow of the Royal Society.
- In 1971 he was made a Companion of the Order of Canada.
- In 1978 he was awarded a Doctor of Science, honoris causa, from the University of British Columbia.
- In 1978 he was awarded the Queen Elizabeth II Silver Jubilee Medal
- In 1979 he received an honorary doctorate from Concordia University.

Professional and academic associations
Preceded by Robert Folinsbee	President of the Royal Society of Canada; 1978–1981	Succeeded by Marc-Adélard Tremblay
