= Robert Folinsbee =

Canadian geologist (1917–2008)

Robert Edward Folinsbee
- Born: April 16, 1917; Edmonton, Alberta, Canada
- Died: May 1, 2008 (aged 91)
- Education: University of Alberta; University of Minnesota
- Awards: Order of Canada
- Scientific career
- Fields: Geologist
- Workplaces: University of Alberta

Robert Edward Folinsbee OC FRSC (April 16, 1917 – May 1, 2008) was a Canadian geologist, whose work involved geochronology, ore deposits, and meteorites.

Born in Edmonton, Alberta, he received a Bachelor of Science degree in 1938 from the University of Alberta, a Master of Science degree in 1940 and a Ph.D. in 1942 from the University of Minnesota. During World War II, he served with the Royal Canadian Air Force as a pilot.

In 1946, he joined the University of Alberta as an assistant professor. He became an associate professor in 1950 and a full professor in 1955. He retired in 1978 and was appointed professor emeritus. From 1955 to 1969, he was the chairman of the Department of Geology.

Folinsbee was instrumental in establishing the Meteorite Observation and Recovery Program, which ran from 1971 to 1985.

He was president of the Geological Society of America (1975–1976) and the Royal Society of Canada (1977–1978).

In 1973, he was made an Officer of the Order of Canada. In 1967, he was awarded the Royal Society of Canada's Willet G. Miller Medal.

His earliest papers focused mainly on mineralogy and regional geology published by the Geological Survey of Canada. His later publications reflected his interests in the fields of geochronology, ore deposits, and meteorites.

The asteroid (187679) Folinsbee is named in his honour.

Professional and academic associations
| Preceded by Larkin Kerwin | President of the Royal Society of Canada; 1977–1978 | Succeeded by Robert Edward Bell |
