= Léon Lortie =

Canadian chemist

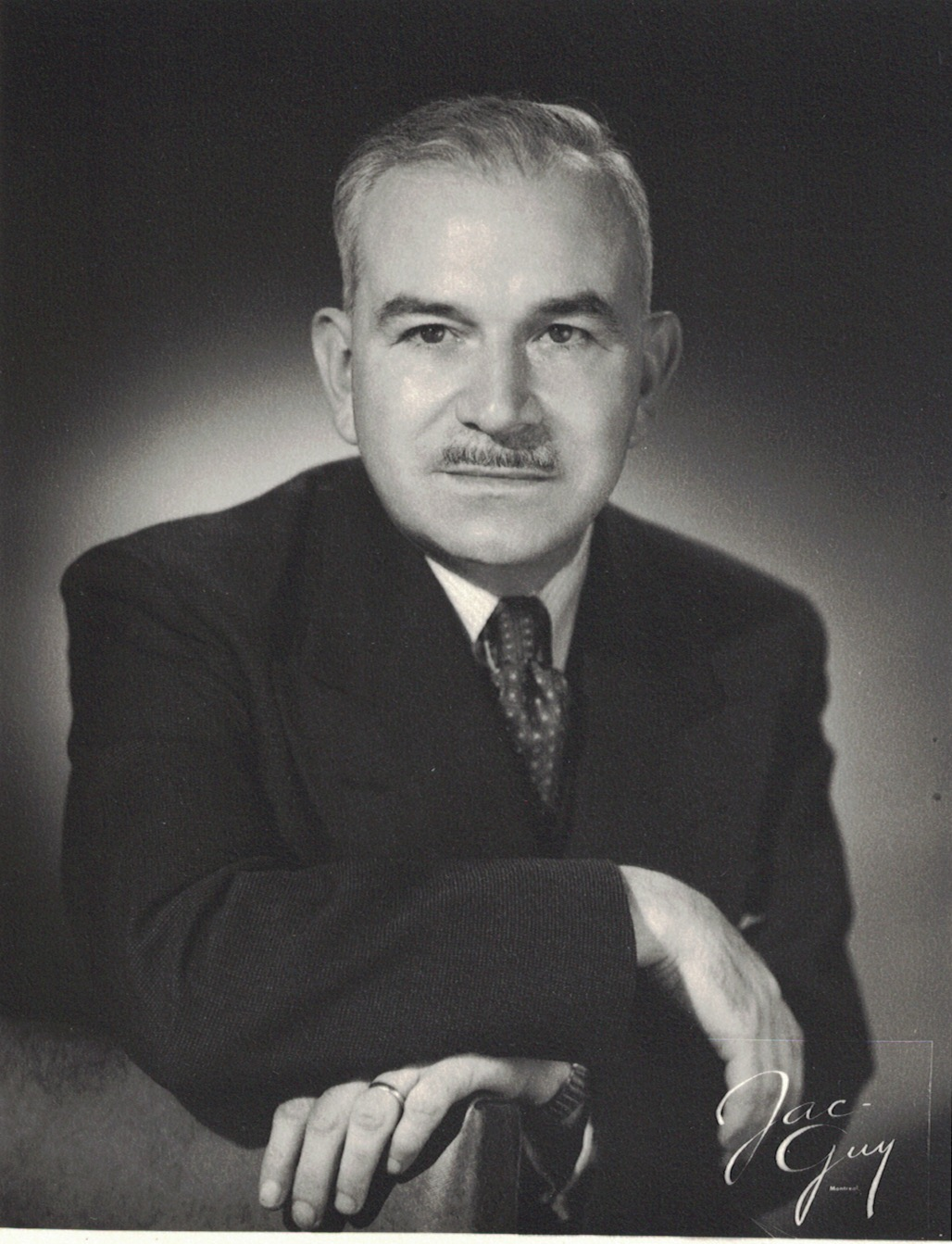
- Born: August 31, 1902; Montreal, Quebec
- Died: December 31, 1985 (aged 83)
- Awards: Order of Canada
- Scientific career
- Fields: Chemistry
- Doctoral advisor: Nathalie Demassieux

Léon Lortie, OC MSRC (August 31, 1902 – December 31, 1985) was a Canadian chemist, academic, and writer.

In 1930, he defended his thesis on cerium under the direction of Nathalie Demassieux.

In 1970, he was made an Officer of the Order of Canada in recognition for having "distinguished himself in many government and professional organizations".

Professional and academic associations
Preceded by James M. Harrison	President of the Royal Society of Canada; 1968–1969	Succeeded by Claude Ernest Dolman
