= List of fellows of the Royal Society elected in 1951 =

This article lists fellows of the Royal Society elected in 1951.

== Fellow ==
1. Carlyle Smith Beals
2. Sir John Smith Knox Boyd
3. David Guthrie Catcheside
4. Arthur Herbert Cook
5. Sydney John Folley
6. Herbert Frohlich
7. Geoffrey Gee
8. Hans Arnold Heilbronn
9. Gerhard Herzberg
10. Sir Joseph Burtt Hutchinson
11. Harry Raymond Ing
12. David Lambert Lack
13. Thaddeus Robert Rudolph Mann
14. Kurt Alfred Georg Mendelssohn
15. Albert Neuberger
16. Leonard Bessemer Pfeil
17. James Arthur Prescott
18. Maurice Henry Lecorney Pryce
19. Sir William John Pugh
20. John Ashworth Ratcliffe
21. Thomas Alan Stephenson
22. William Homan Thorpe
23. Petrus Johann Du Toit
24. Alan Turing
25. Alfred Rene Jean Paul Ubbelohde

== Foreign members ==
1. Herbert McLean Evans
2. Karl Spencer Lashley
3. Frederik Carl Mulertz Stormer
4. Ralph Walter Graystone Wykoff

== Royal and statute 12 fellow ==
1. Prince Philip, Duke of Edinburgh
