= Harry Thode =

Canadian geochemist (1910–1997)

Professor Harry Thode CC MBE FRSC

2nd President and Vice-Chancellor of McMaster University
- In office 1961–1972
- Preceded by: George Gilmour
- Succeeded by: Arthur Bourns

President of the Royal Society of Canada
- In office 1959–1960
- Preceded by: Pierre Daviault
- Succeeded by: Merton Yarwood Williams

Personal details
- Born: Henry George Thode; September 10, 1910 Dundurn, Saskatchewan
- Died: March 22, 1997 (aged 86) Dundas, Ontario
- Occupation: Nuclear scientist

Henry George Thode (September 10, 1910 – March 22, 1997) was a Canadian geochemist, nuclear chemist, and academic administrator. He was president and vice-chancellor of McMaster University from 1961 to 1972. Thode built a cyclotron capable of making radioactive isotopes and, along with C. H. Jaimet, investigated the use of radioactive iodine in the diagnosis and treatment of thyroid disease in humans, the first medical application of radioactive iodine in Canada.

Born in Dundurn, Saskatchewan, he received his BSc in 1930 and his MSc in 1932 from the University of Saskatchewan. In 1934, he received his PhD in physical chemistry from the University of Chicago.

He joined McMaster University in 1939 as an associate professor of chemistry, became a full professor in 1944; was named director of research in 1947; appointed head of the chemistry department from 1948 to 1952; became principal of Hamilton College in 1949; appointed vice-president in 1957; and in 1961 became president and vice chancellor. He retired as president in 1972. Thode died in 1997 in Dundas, Ontario.

== Honours ==
He was made a Member of the Order of the British Empire for his contributions to atomic research during World War II. He was named a Fellow of the Royal Society of Canada in 1943 and a Fellow of the Royal Society in 1954. In 1967 he was the first scientist to be made a Companion of the Order of Canada.

The science and engineering library at McMaster University is named after him.

Professional and academic associations
Preceded by Pierre Daviault	President of the Royal Society of Canada; 1959–1960	Succeeded by Merton Yarwood Williams
