= Digby McLaren =

Canadian geologist and paleontologist

Digby Johns McLaren
- Born: 11 December 1919; Carrickfergus, Ireland
- Died: 8 December 2004 (aged 84)
- Education: University of Michigan
- Awards: Order of Canada; Logan Medal (1987)
- Scientific career
- Fields: Geology & paleontology

Digby Johns McLaren, OC FRS FRSC (11 December 1919 – 8 December 2004) was a Canadian geologist and palaeontologist.

Born in Carrickfergus, Ireland, and educated at Sedbergh School, he received a Bachelor of Arts in geology from the University of Cambridge. During World War II, he fought in the Middle East and Europe with the Royal Regiment of Artillery. After the war, he received a Master of Arts in geology from the University of Cambridge in 1948. In 1948, he moved to Canada and joined the Geological Survey of Canada (GSC). In 1951, he received a Ph.D. from the University of Michigan.

From 1959 to 1967, he was the head of the palaeontology section of the GSC. In 1967, he became the first director of the Institute of Sedimentary and Petroleum Geology of the GSC and in 1973 he was appointed director of the Geological Survey of Canada. In 1981, he became Assistant Deputy Minister of Science and Technology for Energy, Mines and Resources Canada.

He was the author of over 100 publications and maps in the fields of palaeontology, biostratigraphy and regional geology. He was one of the early theorists of the Cretaceous–Paleogene extinction event.

From 1987 to 1990, he was the president of the Royal Society of Canada. He was also president of the Geological Society of America.

In 1942, he married Phyllis Matkin, with whom he had three children: Ian, Patrick, and Alison.

== Honours ==
- In 1968, he was made a Fellow of the Royal Society of Canada.
- In 1979, he was made a Fellow of the Royal Society
- In 1979, he was made a Foreign Associate of the U.S. National Academy of Sciences
- In 1987, he was awarded the Geological Association of Canada's highest honour, the Logan Medal
- In 1987, he was made an Officer of the Order of Canada.
- In 1994, he was elected an International member of the American Philosophical Society.

Professional and academic associations
Preceded by Alexander Gordon McKay	President of the Royal Society of Canada; 1987–1990	Succeeded by Jules Deschênes
