= Pierre Daviault =

Canadian translator and author

Pierre-Alfred Daviault
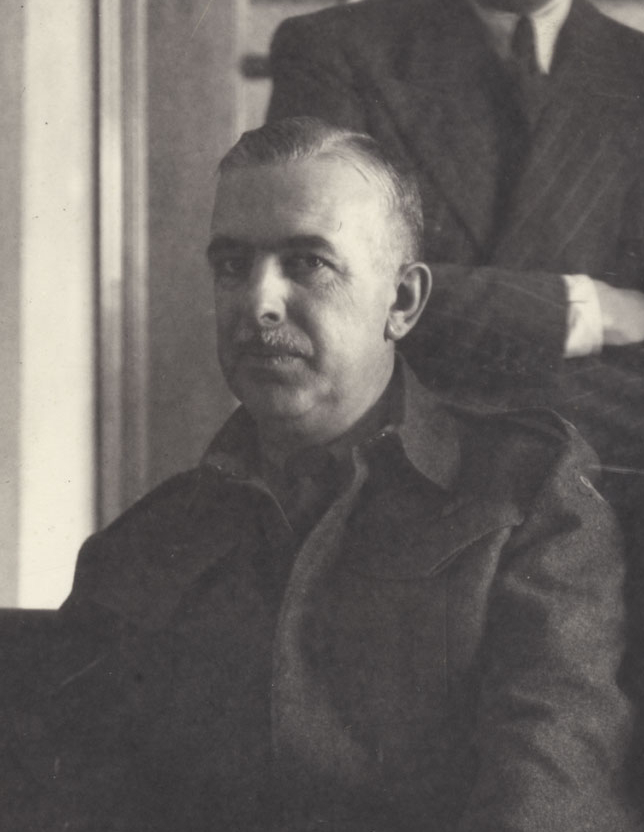
- Born: November 9, 1899; Saint-Jérôme, Quebec, Canada
- Died: November 18, 1964 (aged 65); Ottawa, Ontario, Canada
- Known for: Translator and author

Pierre-Alfred Daviault (November 9, 1899 – November 18, 1964) was a Canadian translator and author. He helped to create the first professional translation courses in Canada.

== Life ==
Born in Saint-Jérôme, Quebec, the son of Philippe-Landry Daviault and Clothilde Lauzon, he studied at the University of Montreal and at the Sorbonne.

From 1958 to 1959, he was president of the Royal Society of Canada and was awarded its Pierre Chauveau Medal in 1952.

== Selected works ==
- Le Mystère des Mille-Îles, 1927
- L'Expression juste en traduction, 1931
- Questions de langue, 1933
- La Grande Aventure de Le Moyne d'Iberville, 1934
- Traduction, 1941
- Nora l'énigmatique, 1945
- Language et traduction, 1961

Professional and academic associations
| Preceded by Thomas Cameron | President of the Royal Society of Canada; 1958–1959 | Succeeded by Harry Thode |
