= W. Kaye Lamb =

Canadian historian (1904–1999)

William Kaye Lamb
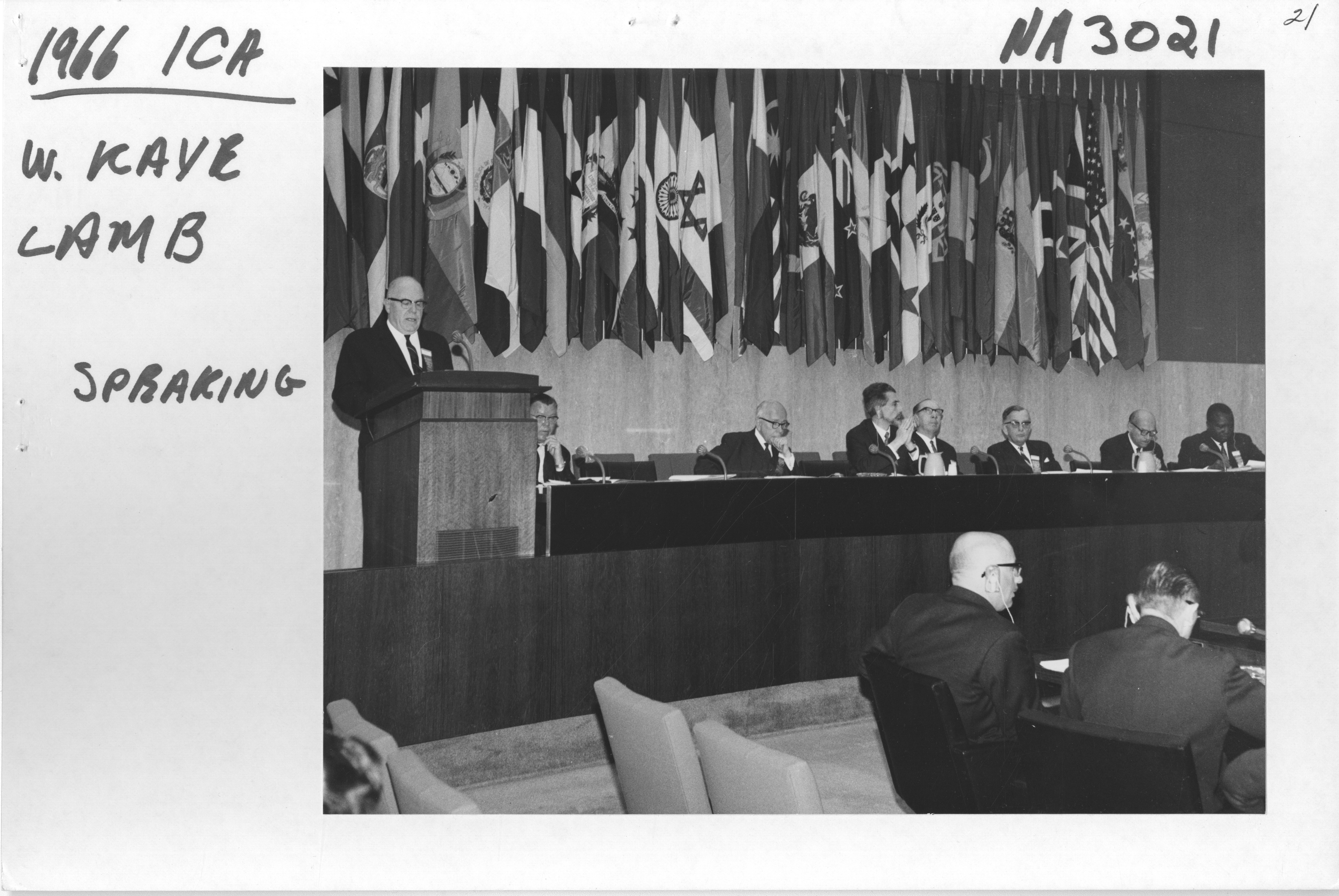
- Born: May 11, 1904; New Westminster, British Columbia, Canada
- Died: August 24, 1999 (aged 95)
- Occupations: Historian, archivist, librarian, and civil servant
- Awards: Order of Canada

William Kaye Lamb OC FRSC (May 11, 1904 – August 24, 1999) was a Canadian historian, archivist, librarian, and civil servant.

== Career ==
Born in New Westminster, British Columbia, Lamb received his BA in 1927 and MA in 1930 from the University of British Columbia. He completed his PhD at the London School of Economics in 1933, under the tutelage of Harold Laski. From 1936 to 1937, he was President of the British Columbia Historical Federation. From 1934 to 1940, he was the Provincial Archivist and Librarian of British Columbia. In 1936, he was also appointed Superintendent of the BC Public Libraries Commission. From 1940 to 1948, he was the University Librarian of the University of British Columbia. From 1948 to 1968 he was the Dominion Archivist of Canada, and from 1953 to 1968 he was the first National Librarian of Canada.

In 1949, he was elected a fellow of the Royal Society of Canada and was its president from 1965 to 1966. In 1969, he was made an Officer of the Order of Canada. Between 1964–1965 he served as president of the Society of American Archivists.

Lamb specialized in the early history of British Columbia. He edited and wrote a number of scholarly books relating to explorers of Western Canada, including George Vancouver, Daniel Williams Harmon, and Sir Alexander MacKenzie, as well as a volume on the history of the Canadian Pacific Railway.

== Personal life ==
In 1939, he married Wessie Tipping, and they had a daughter, Elizabeth (Lamb) Hawkins.

== Bibliography ==
- "ACA Award Recipient Biographies – Dr. W. Kaye Lamb (1904–1999)". Association of Canadian Archivists. Archived from the original on 2015-02-04.

Professional and academic associations
Preceded by Léo Marion	President of the Royal Society of Canada; 1965–1966	Succeeded by Gerhard Herzberg
