= Bioelectrodynamics =

Bioelectrodynamics is a branch of medical physics and bioelectromagnetism which deals with rapidly changing electric and magnetic fields in biological systems, i.e. high frequency endogenous electromagnetic phenomena in living cells. It was first introduced by Harold Saxton Burr at Yale University. Unlike the events studied by the electrophysiology, the generating mechanism of bioelectrodynamic phenomenon is not connected with currents of ions and its frequency is typically much higher. Examples include vibrations of electrically polar intracellular structures and non-thermal emission of photons as a result of metabolic activity.

== Theories and Hypotheses ==
Plenty of theoretical work was published on theories and hypotheses describing generation of electromagnetic field by living cells in very broad frequency range. The most influential one was once probably the Fröhlich's hypothesis of coherence in biological systems introduced by Herbert Fröhlich in the late 1960s. Despite the fact that experimental evidence for Fröhlich's hypothesis does not exist yet, numerical estimates indicate biological feasibility of at least Fröhlich's weak condensation.

Recent theoretical considerations predict generation of radio frequency electromagnetic field in cells as a result of vibrations of electrically polar intracellular structures, e. g., microtubules. Emission in optical part of electromagnetic spectrum is usually attributed to reactive oxygen species (ROS).

== Experimental evidence ==
Bioelectrodynamic effects were experimentally proven in optical range of electromagnetic spectrum. Spontaneous emission of photons by living cells, with intensity significantly higher than corresponds to emission by thermal radiation, was repeatedly reported by several authors over decades. These observations exhibit experimental simplicity and good reproducibility. Although non-thermal emission of photons from living cells is generally accepted phenomenon, much less is known about its origin and properties. On the one hand, it is sometimes attributed to chemiluminescent metabolic reactions (including for instance reactive oxygen species (ROS) ), on the other hand, some authors relate this phenomenon to far-from-equilibrium thermodynamics.

Indirect evidence exists on acoustic and radio frequencies; however, direct measurement of field quantities is missing. Pohl and others observed force effect on dielectric particles which were attracted to cells and repulsed from cells, respectively, depending on particles' dielectric constant. Pohl attributed this behavior to dielectrophoresis caused by electromagnetic field of cells. He estimated the frequency of this field as about hundreds of MHz. Other indirect evidence comes from the fact that mechanical vibrations were experimentally proven in very broad frequency range in cells. Since many structures in cells are electrically polar, they will generate electromagnetic field if they vibrate.

== Controversy ==
As a question opened for decades, bioelectrodynamics was not always part of scientific mainstream and thus it was sometimes treated with poor scientific standards. This is particularly true for:

1. - overestimation of the significance of experimental data obtained (Kucera argues that claims by several authors about direct measurement of cellular electromagnetic activity in radio-frequency band should be accepted with skepticism since technical properties of experimental setups have not even met criteria arising from optimistic theoretical biophysical predictions. Firstly, spatial resolution of used sensors was too low with respect to expected spatial complexity of electromagnetic field in cells. Secondly, the sensitivity of experimental setups was not high enough compared to power available in living cell.),
2. - misinterpretation of experimental data (Fritz-Albert Popp's claim about coherence of photo-emission from cells is based on statistical distribution of photon counts; however, this is not proof of coherence. Coherent emission (see coherent states) has Poisson distribution, but Poisson distribution is not exclusively related only to coherent processes.) and
3. - development of uncorroborated hypotheses .

== See also ==
- Medical physics
- Bioelectromagnetism
