= George Bryce =

Presbyterian minister and author (1844–1931)

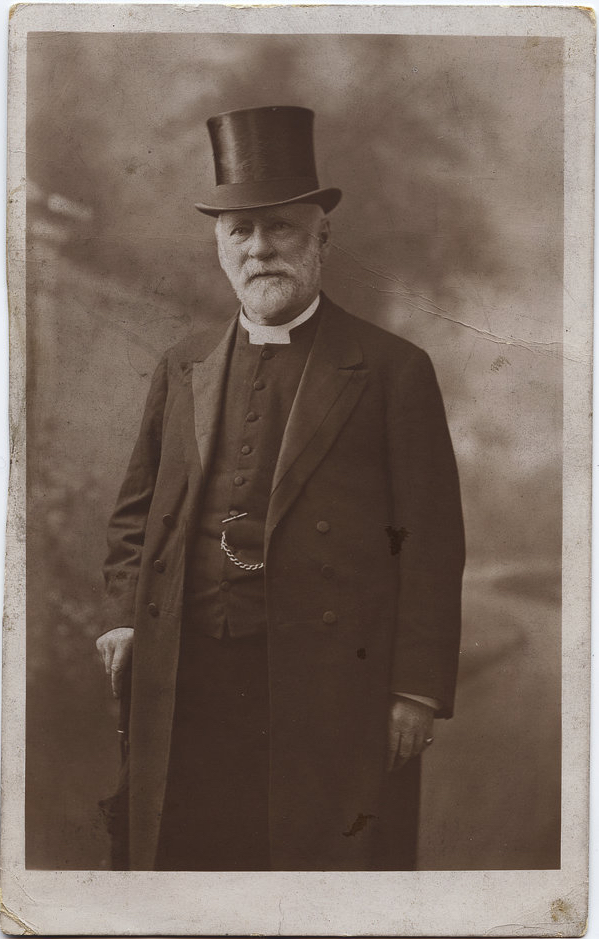
Rev. Dr. George Bryce. Born 1844 in Mount Pleasant, Canada West.

George Bryce (April 22, 1844 – August 5, 1931) was a Presbyterian minister and a prolific author, writing on many topics including history of the Red River Colony in what is now Manitoba, Canada.

Bryce was born near Mount Pleasant, Canada West (now Ontario). He was elected to the Royal Society of Canada in 1902 and served as the Royal Society's president in 1910. He was founder of Manitoba College and was responsible for organizing the Manitoba Historical Society in 1875 and the Manitoba Historical and Scientific Society in 1879.

His Scottish-born wife, Marion Samuel Bryce, was an educator identified with the earliest philanthropic activities of Winnipeg. His younger brother, Peter Bryce, was a public health official.

== Works ==
- Manitoba: Infancy, Progress, and Present Condition, (1882)
- The Mound Builders: A Lost Race, (c1885)
- The Celt In The North-West, (1887)
- A Short History Of The Canadian People, (1887/1914)
- Holiday Rambles Between Winnipeg And Victoria, (1888)
- John Black, The Apostle Of The Red River, (1898)
- Sketch Of The Life And Discoveries Of Robert Campbell, (1898)
- The Remarkable History Of The Hudson's Bay Company, (1900)
- Mackenzie, Selkirk, Simpson, (1905)
- Everyman's Geology Of Western Canada, (1907)
- A Poet's Message, (c1909)
- The Romantic Settlement Of Lord Selkirk's Colonists:...Manitoba, (1909)
- The Scotsman In Canada, vol 2 , (1911)
- The Life Of Lord Selkirk, (1912)

Professional and academic associations
Preceded by Joseph-Edmond Roy	President of the Royal Society of Canada; 1909–1910	Succeeded by R. Ramsay Wright
