= Merton Yarwood Williams =

Canadian geologist and academic

- Born: June 21, 1883; Bloomfield, Ontario, Canada
- Died: February 3, 1974 (aged 90); Vancouver, British Columbia, Canada
- Education: Queen's University; Yale University
- Scientific career
- Fields: Geology
- Workplaces: Geological Survey of Canada; University of British Columbia
- Doctoral advisor: Charles Schuchert

Merton Yarwood Williams (June 21, 1883 – February 3, 1974) was a Canadian geologist and academic.

== Education ==
Born near Bloomfield, Ontario, of Loyalist descent, Williams graduated from Picton High School in 1902 and was a teacher for three years before starting University. He received a Bachelor of Science degree in mining engineering from Queen's University in 1909. While a student at University, he was a student assistant for the Geological Survey of Canada and did geological work in British Columbia, Yukon and Nova Scotia. In 1912, he received a Ph.D. degree from Yale University where he studied stratigraphy and paleontology under Charles Schuchert. He married Lula Maud Philp in 1915.

== Career ==
In 1912, he joined the Geological Survey of Canada and worked in Ontario on the regional stratigraphy of Ordovician and Silurian formations of the Bruce Peninsula, the Manitoulin Island, and the James Bay area. In 1921, he became an associate professor of paleontology and stratigraphy at the University of British Columbia (UBC) where helped to build the Department of Geology. While at UBC he studied the geology of the Mackenzie River and the Franklin Mountains.

In 1920s, he went to Hong Kong where he made a geological study which produced a map in 1935 and a description of the geology in 1943. In 1926, he was made a full professor of paleontology and stratigraphy and was appointed head of the Department of Geology and Geography in 1936. He taught courses in introductory geology, historical geology, and paleontology. He retired in 1950.

In 1916, he was made a Fellow of the Geological Society of America and served as its vice-president from 1945 to 1946. In 1926, he was made a Fellow of the Royal Society of Canada and served as its president from 1960 to 1961.

Professional and academic associations
Preceded by Harry Thode	President of the Royal Society of Canada; 1960–1961	Succeeded by Arthur R. M. Lower
