= Léo Marion =

Léo Edmond Marion
- Born: March 22, 1899; Ottawa, Ontario, Canada
- Died: July 16, 1979 (aged 80); Ottawa, Ontario, Canada
- Occupation: organic chemist
- Title: President of the Royal Society of Canada
- Term: 1964-1965
- Predecessor: Maurice Lebel
- Successor: William Kaye Lamb
- Awards: Order of Canada; Order of the British Empire; Fellow of the Royal Society

Léo Edmond Marion, CC MBE FRSC FRS (March 22, 1899 – July 16, 1979) was a Canadian organic chemist and academic administrator.

He was Vice-President of the National Research Council of Canada. From 1964 until 1965 he was President of the Royal Society of Canada. From 1965 until 1969, he was Dean of Faculty of Pure and Applied Science at the University of Ottawa.

== Honours ==
- In 1963 he was awarded an Honorary Doctor of Science from the University of British Columbia.
- In 1965 he was awarded an Honorary Doctor of Science from Carleton University.
- In 1967 he was made a Companion of the Order of Canada.
- In 1968 he was awarded an Honorary Doctor of Laws from the University of Saskatchewan.

Professional and academic associations
Preceded by Maurice Lebel	President of the Royal Society of Canada; 1964–1965	Succeeded by W. Kaye Lamb
