= Claude Ernest Dolman =

Canadian academic and microbiologist (1906–1994)

- Born: 23 May 1906; Porthleven, Cornwall, England
- Died: 15 December 1994 (aged 88); Vancouver, British Columbia, Canada
- Citizenship: Canadian
- Education: St Mary's Hospital Medical School
- Scientific career
- Fields: Microbiology
- Workplaces: University of British Columbia

Claude Ernest Dolman (23 May 1906 – 15 December 1994) was an English-born Canadian academic and microbiologist.

Born in Porthleven, Cornwall, Dolman received his medical education from St Mary's Hospital Medical School in London. His teachers included Alexander Fleming and Almroth Wright. Fleming encouraged Dolman to conduct research into the Staphylococcus bacteria. In 1931, he moved to Canada and became a research assistant and clinical associate in Connaught Laboratories at the University of Toronto. In 1925, he moved to Vancouver. From 1936 to 1951, he was the head of the department of bacteriology and preventive medicine at the University of British Columbia and from 1951 to 1961 he was the head of the department of bacteriology and immunology. He was also acting head of the department of nursing and health from 1933 to 1943 and was head of the department from 1943 to 1951.

In 1947, he was made a Fellow of the Royal Society of Canada and later served as its president for a term from 1969 to 1970.

Professional and academic associations
Preceded by Léon Lortie	President of the Royal Society of Canada; 1969–1970	Succeeded by Roy Daniells
