= Elyès Jouini =

French Tunisian economist

Elyès Jouini (born in Tunis on January 5, 1965) is a French Tunisian economist and Distinguished Professor of Economics at the University of Paris Dauphine. His research is mainly in the area of financial economics, in particular transaction costs, heterogeneous beliefs, aggregation, long-term risk and the maturity structure of interest rates. After early research on general equilibrium theory, he got interested in modeling financial markets by including both economic and financial dimensions as well as dimensions pertaining to psychology or sociology. His research has been acknowledged by the Best Young French Economist Award in 2005 (together with Esther Duflo, 2008's Best Paper Award in Finance by Europlace Institute of Finance, and the 2009 Finance and Sustainability European Research Award, and was named Chevalier de la Legion d'honneur in 2010.

== Research ==
Elyès Jouini's research interests are at the crossroads between mathematics, economics and finance. As of January 2019, he is ranked among the top 5% of economists registered on IDEAS/RePEc. In his most highly cited article, with Hédi Kallal, Jouini analyses how dynamic securities markets with transaction costs depend on arbitrage, as otherwise the bid-ask spreads would become martingales, which in turn offers a method for determining the investment opportunities available in an economy. Further important research by Jouini (with Clotilde Napp) has dealt with the effect of belief heterogeneity on asset pricing, and vector-valued and law-invariant risk measures (with Moncef Meddeb, Nizar Touzi and Walter Schachermayer).

== Distinctions ==
- Winner of the Nathalie Demassieux Prize from the Chancellery of the Universities of Paris (1990)
- Commander of the National Order of Merit of Tunisia (1995)
- Winner of the Prize for the best young economist in France (2005) with Esther Duflo
- Knight of the Legion of Honor (2010)
- Fellow of the Institute of Labor Economics (2012)
- Fellow of the Econometric Society (2017)
