= Thomas Cameron =

Canadian scientist (1894–1980)

Thomas Wright Moir Cameron OC FRSC
- Born: Thomas Wright Moir Cameron; 29 April 1894; Glasgow, Scotland
- Died: 1 January 1980 (aged 85); Silver Spring, Maryland, US
- Education: University of Glasgow; University of Edinburgh
- Awards: Flavelle Medal (1957)
- Scientific career
- Fields: Parasitology
- Thesis: On the Intestinal Parasites of Sheep and Other Ruminants in Scotland (1923)

Thomas Wright Moir Cameron OC FRSC (29 April 1894 – 1 January 1980) was a Canadian veterinarian and parasitologist.

Born in Glasgow, Scotland, he received a Bachelor of Science degree in veterinary science, a Master of Arts degree in parasitology, a Doctor of Philosophy (PhD) degree in parasitology, and a Doctor of Science degree in zoology from the University of Glasgow and University of Edinburgh. During World War I, he served with the Highland Light Infantry and as a captain in the Royal Flying Corps.

After completing his PhD he held posts at the Institute of Agricultural Parasitology, London (1923–1925), and the London School of Hygiene and Tropical Medicine (1925–1932). In 1932, he emigrated to Canada to assume the position of Professor of Parasitology, and was appointed the founding director of the Institute of Parasitology at Macdonald College, McGill University.

He served as president of the Royal Society of Canada (1957–1958), Canadian Society of Microbiologists (1960), Canadian Society of Zoologists (1961–1962), and the World Federation of Parasitologists (1964–1970).

He is the author of The Parasites of Man in Temperate Climates (University of Toronto Press, 1946), The Parasites of Domestic Animals: A Manual for Veterinary Students and Surgeons (Lippincott, 1951), and Parasites and Parasitism (Methuen, 1956).

== Honours ==
In 1972, he was made an Officer of the Order of Canada "for his contributions to the advancement of science". In 1957, he was awarded the Royal Society of Canada's Flavelle Medal. He also received the Canadian Centennial Medal. In 1960, he was awarded an honorary Doctor of Science from the University of British Columbia.

Professional and academic associations
Preceded by W. A. Mackintosh	President of the Royal Society of Canada; 1957–1958	Succeeded by Pierre Daviault
