= Royal Society of Canada =

National academy of Canada

- Formation: 1882
- Type: Learned society
- Legal status: Nonprofit organization
- Headquarters: 282 Somerset Street W
- Location: Ottawa, Ontario
- Official languages: English; French
- Website: rsc-src.ca

The Royal Society of Canada (RSC; French: Société royale du Canada, SRC) is the senior national, bilingual council of distinguished Canadian scholars, humanists, scientists, and artists in Canada.

As Canada's national academy, the RSC exists to promote Canadian research and scholarly accomplishment in both of Canada's official languages; advise governments, non-governmental organizations, and Canadians generally on matters of public interest; recognize academic and artistic excellence; and mentor young scholars and artists.

== History ==
In the late 1870s, the Governor General of Canada, John Campbell, Marquis of Lorne, determined that Canada required a cultural institution to promote national scientific research and development. Since that time, succeeding governors general have remained involved with the affairs of the Society. In 1882, the Royal Society of Canada was founded with the personal patronage of Lord Lorne. A year later, in 1883, the Society was incorporated by an act of the Parliament of Canada.

From its founding until the early 1900s, the structure of the RSC imitated the model of the Royal Society of London, but with the important addition of literature and other elements found in the Institut de France. Like their counterparts, membership to the RSC was limited and by election. Initially, the RSC was divided into four sections, each of 20 Fellows. These sections were: French literature, history, and archaeology; English literature, history, and archaeology; mathematical, physical and chemical sciences; and geological and biological sciences.

The founding fellows of the RSC included Sandford Fleming, the originator of the world system of Standard Time, and William Osler, one of the greatest physicians of his time. The fellows of the RSC were nominated by a committee directed by the Principal of McGill University, John William Dawson, and by the former Premier of Quebec, Pierre Chauveau. These two men served as the first and second presidents of the Society.

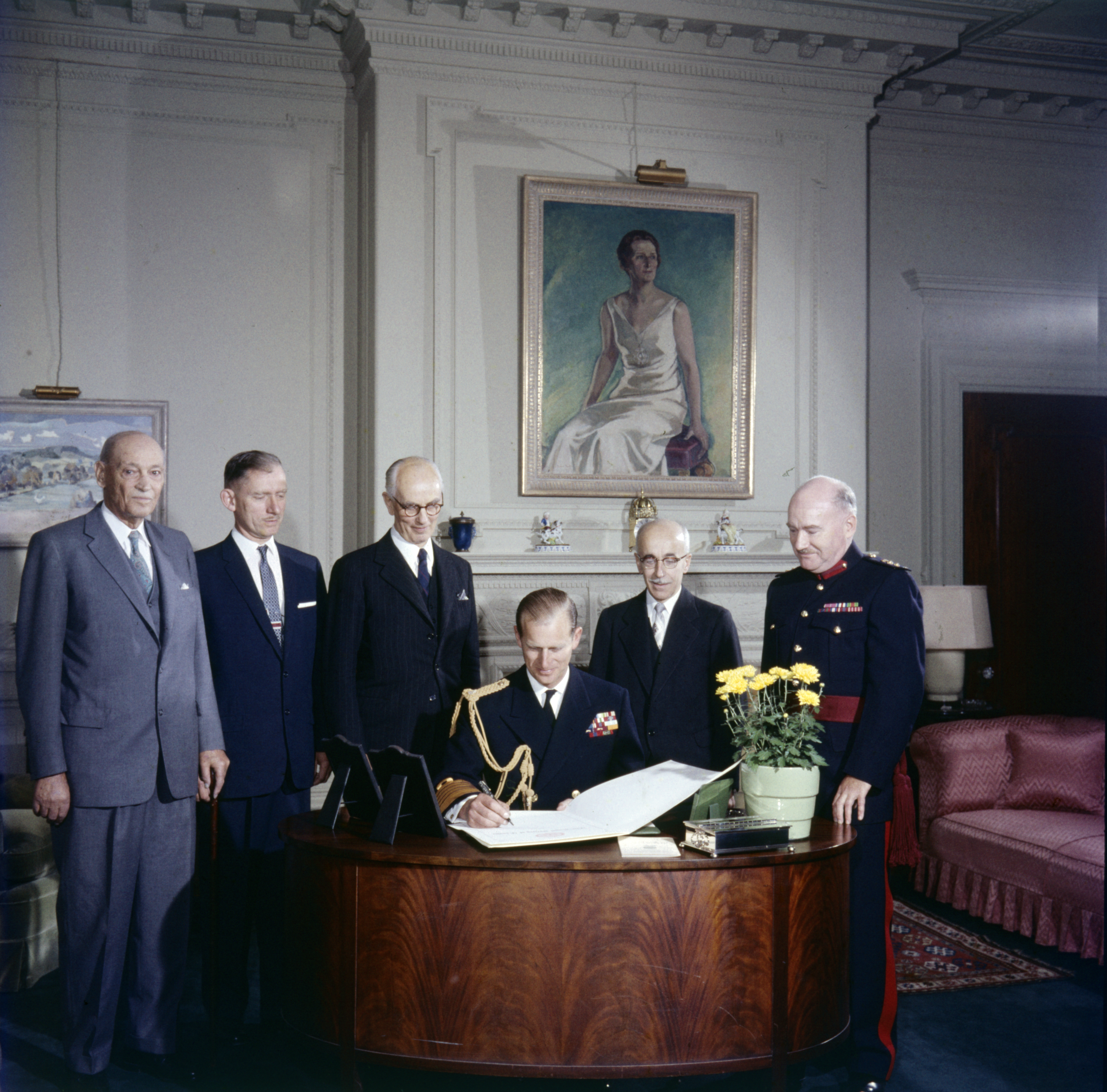
Prince Philip, Duke of Edinburgh (seated), the consort of Elizabeth II, Queen of Canada, is admitted to the Royal Society of Canada at Rideau Hall, in Ottawa, Ontario. The officers of the Society (standing, left to right) are: Charles Camsell, L.S. Russell, T.W.N. Cameron, President Leon Marion, and C.P. Stacey

As Canadian scholarship and research increased, the RSC also grew. Within three decades, the fellowship of the RSC doubled in number. After several phases of restructuring, the RSC evolved its contemporary organization. In 2010, Governor General David Johnston was elected as an honorary fellow of the Society.

== RSC academies ==
Each year, the RSC elects approximately 100 Fellows to its three Academies: the Academy of Arts and Humanities, the Academy of Social Sciences, and the Academy of Science. These individuals have made significant contributions to their fields and Canadian public life. In 2024, the RSC included over 2,500 Fellows.

There are three divisions of the Academy of Arts and Humanities: an anglophone division, humanities; a francophone division, letters and humanities; and a bilingual division for the arts, embracing architecture, creative writing, and other arts. There are two divisions of the Academy of Social Sciences: an anglophone division, social sciences; and Sciences Sociales. There are five bilingual divisions of the Academy of Science: applied sciences and engineering; Earth, ocean, and atmospheric sciences; biological sciences; medical sciences; mathematical and physical sciences.

Presently, the Fellowship comprises four categories: Regularly Elected Fellows, Specially Elected Fellows, International Fellows, and Honorary Fellows. Once inducted into the Society, Fellows may use the post-nominal letters FRSC (fellow of the Royal Society of Canada) in English and MSRC (membre de la Société royale du Canada) in French.

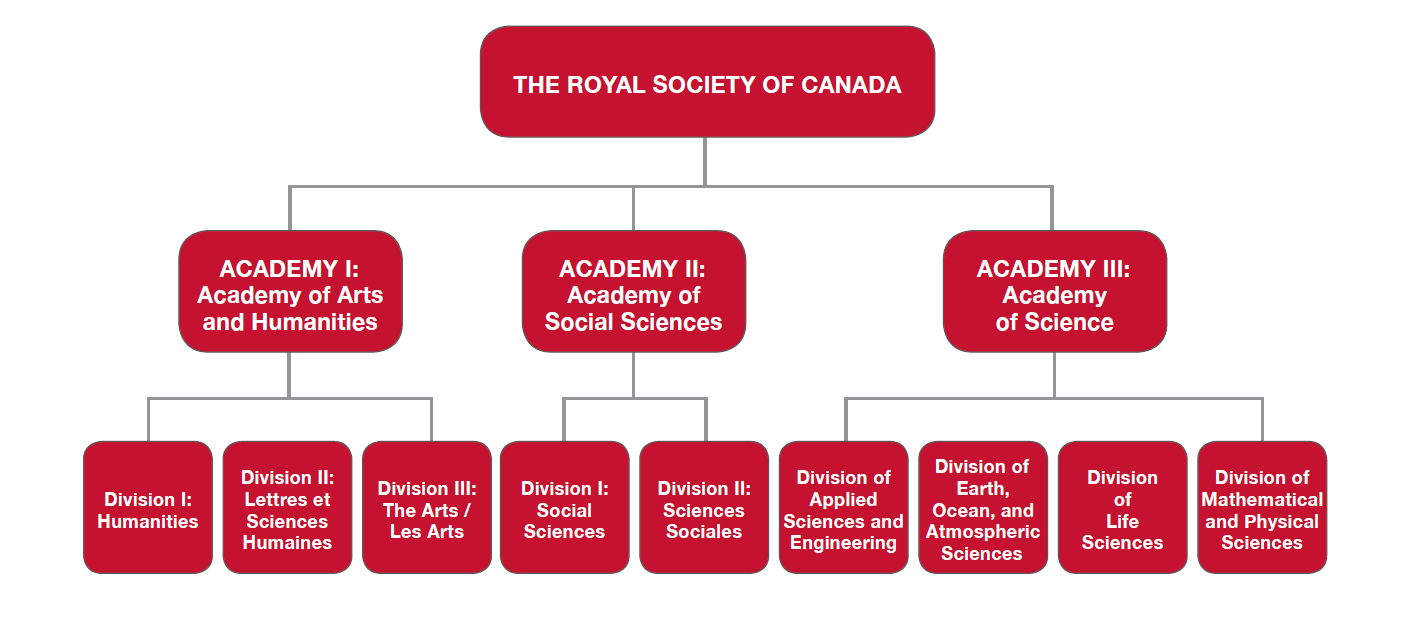

== The College of New Scholars, Artists, and Scientists ==
The College of New Scholars, Artists, and Scientists (also known as the RSC College) was established in 2014 to represent the emerging generation of intellectual leaders in Canada. Each year, approximately 50 Canadians and Permanent Residents are elected to the college for a seven-year term. Nomination of candidates for the college follows a similar procedure as nomination for the Fellows of RSC.

== Institutional members ==
The RSC officially began the Institutional Member (IM) programme in 2004. The goal was to provide a mechanism by which the Society could develop its programmes in conjunction with Canadian universities and by which universities could have formal and direct input into the strategic organization and governance of the Society. This closer relationship facilitates the nomination of new Fellows and College Members from all Canadian universities and provides a means for the Society to sponsor scholarly activities at institutions of all sizes across Canada. There are currently 61 Institutional Members of the RSC.

== Awards ==
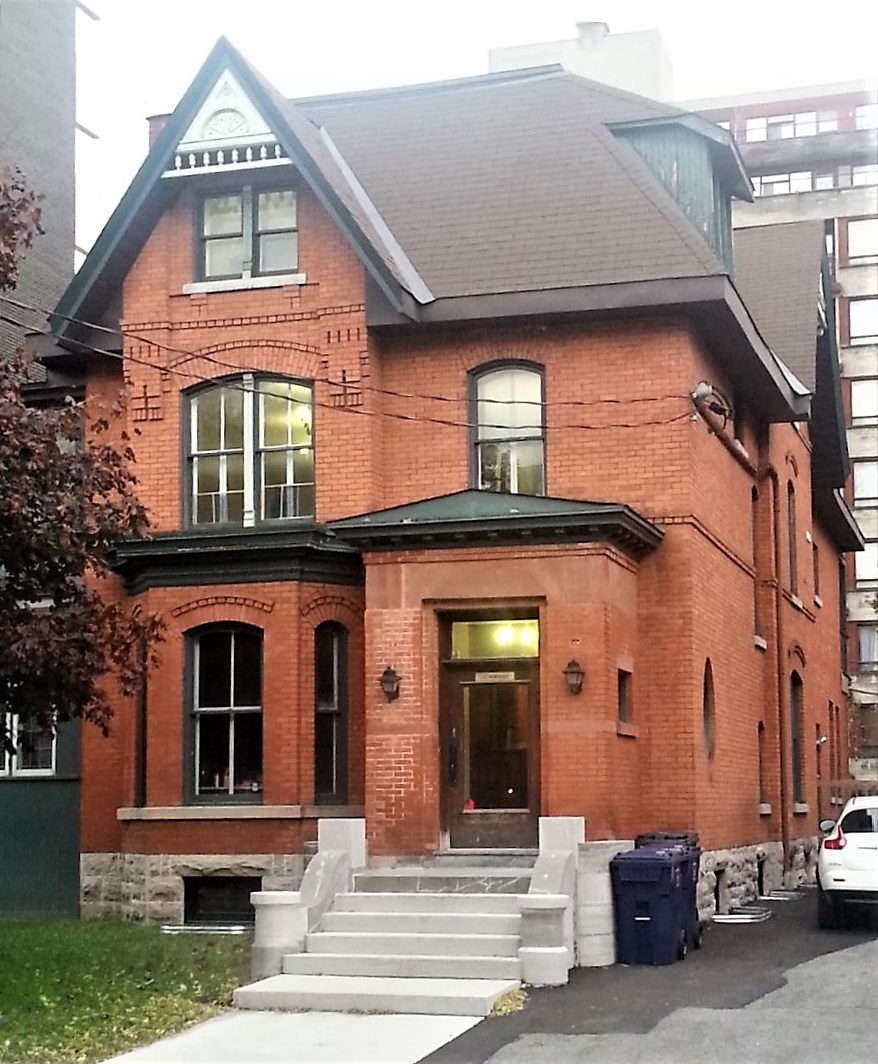
The headquarters of the Royal Society of Canada in Ottawa

The RSC recognizes notable achievements in research and innovation by awarding medals and prizes. Twenty three Society awards are offered on an annual or biennial basis and consist of either medals or certificates, some of them with cash prizes.

== Leadership ==
- 1882–1883 John William Dawson
- 1883–1884 Pierre J. O. Chauveau
- 1884–1885 T. Sterry Hunt
- 1885–1886 Daniel Wilson
- 1886–1887 Thomas E. Hamel
- 1887–1888 George Lawson
- 1888–1889 Sandford Fleming
- 1889–1890 Raymond Casgrain
- 1890–1891 George Monro Grant
- 1891–1892 Joseph-Clovis-Kemner Laflamme
- 1892–1893 John George Bourinot
- 1893–1894 George M. Dawson
- 1894–1895 James MacPherson Le Moine
- 1895–1896 Alfred R. C. Selwyn
- 1896–1897 Cornelius O'Brien
- 1897–1898 Félix-G. Marchand
- 1898–1899 Thomas C. Keefer
- 1899–1900 William Clark
- 1900–1901 Louis Fréchette
- 1901–1902 James Loudon
- 1902–1903 James A. Grant
- 1903–1904 George T. Denison
- 1904–1905 Benjamin Sulte
- 1905–1906 Alexander Johnson
- 1906–1907 William Saunders
- 1907–1908 Samuel E. Dawson
- 1908–1909 Joseph-Edmond Roy
- 1909–1910 George Bryce
- 1910–1911 R. Ramsay Wright
- 1911–1912 William F. King
- 1912–1913 William Dawson LeSueur
- 1913–1914 Frank D. Adams
- 1914–1915 Adolphe B. Routhier
- 1915–1916 Alfred Baker
- 1916–1917 Archibald B. Macallum
- 1917–1918 William D. Lighthall
- 1918–1919 Rodolphe Lemieux
- 1919–1920 Robert F. Ruttan
- 1920–1921 Arthur P. Coleman
- 1921–1922 Duncan C. Scott
- 1922–1923 J. Playfair McMurrich
- 1923–1924 Thomas Chapais
- 1924–1925 John C. McLennan
- 1925–1926 William A. Parks
- 1926–1927 James H. Coyne
- 1927–1928 A. H. Reginald Buller
- 1928–1929 Camille Roy
- 1929–1930 Arthur S. Eve
- 1930–1931 Charles Camsell
- 1931–1932 Robert A. Falconer
- 1932–1933 Francis E. Lloyd
- 1933–1934 Léon Gérin
- 1934–1935 W. Lash Miller
- 1935–1936 Reginald W. Brock & George A. Young
- 1936–1937 Lawrence J. Burpee
- 1937–1938 Archibald G. Huntsman
- 1938–1939 Victor Morin
- 1939–1940 Henry Marshall Tory
- 1940–1941 Robert C. Wallace
- 1941–1942 Frederick W. Howay
- 1942–1943 James Collip
- 1943–1944 Olivier Maurault
- 1944–1945 John K. Robertson
- 1945–1946 Elwood S. Moore
- 1946–1947 Harold A. Innis
- 1947–1948 Walter P. Thompson
- 1948–1949 Gustave Lanctôt
- 1949–1950 Joseph A. Pearce
- 1950–1951 John J. O'Neill
- 1951–1952 Henry F. Angus
- 1952–1953 Guilford B. Reed
- 1953–1954 Jean Bruchési
- 1954–1955 Edgar William R. Steacie
- 1955–1956 George S. Hume
- 1956–1957 William A. Mackintosh
- 1957–1958 Thomas W. M. Cameron
- 1958–1959 Pierre Daviault
- 1959–1960 Henry G. Thode
- 1960–1961 Merton Y. Williams
- 1961–1962 Arthur R. M. Lower
- 1962–1963 William H. Cook
- 1963–1964 Maurice Lebel
- 1964–1965 Léo Marion
- 1965–1966 William Kaye Lamb
- 1966–1967 Gerhard Herzberg
- 1967–1968 James M. Harrison
- 1968–1969 Léon Lortie
- 1969–1970 Claude E. Dolman
- 1970–1971 Roy Daniells
- 1971–1972 Henry E. Duckworth
- 1972–1973 John Tuzo Wilson
- 1973–1974 Guy Sylvestre
- 1974–1975 Claude Fortier
- 1975–1976 Samuel D. Clark
- 1976–1977 J. Larkin Kerwin
- 1977–1978 Robert E. Folinsbee
- 1978–1981 Robert E. Bell
- 1981–1984 Marc-Adélard Tremblay
- 1984–1987 Alexander G. McKay
- 1987–1990 Digby J. McLaren
- 1990–1992 Jules Deschênes
- 1992–1995 John Meisel
- 1995–1997 Robert Hall Haynes
- 1997–1999 Jean-Pierre Wallot
- 1999–2001 William Leiss
- 2001–2003 Howard Alper
- 2003–2005 Gilles Paquet
- 2005–2007 Patricia Demers
- 2007–2009 Yvan Guindon
- 2009–2011 Roderick A. Macdonald
- 2011–2013 Yolande Grisé
- 2013–2015 Graham Bell
- 2015–2017 Maryse Lassonde
- 2017–2019 Chad Gaffield
- 2019–2022 Jeremy N. McNeil
- 2022–2025 Alain-G. Gagnon
- 2025– Francoise Baylis

== See also ==
- List of Canadian organizations with royal patronage
