= Arthur R. M. Lower =

Canadian historian

Arthur R. M. Lower CC FRSC
- Born: Arthur Reginald Marsden Lower; 12 August 1889; Barrie, Ontario, Canada
- Died: 7 January 1988 (aged 98); Kingston, Ontario, Canada

Academic background
- Education: University of Toronto; Harvard University
- Influences: Harold Innis; Frederick Jackson Turner

Academic work
- Discipline: History
- Sub-discipline: Canadian history; economic history
- Institutions: Tufts College; United College; Queen's University
- Notable students: Ramsay Cook
- Influenced: Hugh MacLennan

Arthur Reginald Marsden Lower CC FRSC (12 August 1889 – 7 January 1988) was a Canadian historian and "liberal nationalist" interested in Canadian economic history, particularly the forest trade, and in Canada–US relations. He was the most nationalistic of Canadian historians, and highly distrustful of immigrants, Americans and any others outside of what he considered to be the Canadian family. The staple theory of Harold Innis influenced his research, much of which focused on the Canadian lumber industry. He was also strongly influenced by the ideas of American historian Frederick Jackson Turner regarding the influence of the frontier – The West – on distinctly American characteristics. Lower was an outdoorsman who not only loved nature, but emphasized the role of The North in shaping Canada.

== Biography ==
Lower was born in Barrie, Ontario. He studied history at the University of Toronto and Harvard University, where he obtained his doctorate. During World War I he served as an officer in the Royal Navy.

Lower taught history at Tufts College, Massachusetts, at Harvard and at United College, Winnipeg, where he chaired the Department of History for eighteen years. In 1944 he became professor of History at Queen's University, Kingston, a position he held until his retirement in 1959. He received the Royal Society of Canada's J. B. Tyrrell Historical Medal in 1947.

== Work ==
His general history Colony to Nation first published in 1946. In this and other works, Lower influenced many English Canadians with his view of Canada's two nations - notably novelist Hugh MacLennan, the author of Two Solitudes. He also enjoyed poking fun at English Canadian "schooling" which he believed fell well short of "education". although he admired the quality Arianism generated by the frontier, he admitted it encouraged a careless and exploitative attitude toward natural resources, which angered him. The very title of his book on the lumber trade, North American Assault on the Canadian Forest, suggested, a friend told him, an exposé of "conquest, demolition, ravage, plunder, and exploitation."

In terms of Canadian origins, Lower argues:

in its new wilderness home and its new aspect of British North Americanism, colonial Toryism made its second attempt to erect on American soil a copy of the English social edifice. From one point of view this is the most significant thing about the Loyalist movement; it withdrew a class concept of life from the south, moved it up north, and gave it a second chance.

Lower in 1958 provided the long-standard historical interpretation that for English Canada the results were counter-revolutionary:

[English Canada] inherited, not the benefits, but the bitterness of the Revolution. It got no shining scriptures out of it. It got little release of energy and no new horizons of the spirit were opened up. It had been a calamity, pure and simple.... To take the place of the internal fire that was urging Americans westward across the continent, there was only melancholy contemplation of things as they might have been and dingy reflection of that ineffably glorious world across the stormy Atlantic. English Canada started its life with as powerful a nostalgic shove backward into the past as the Conquest had given to French Canada: two little peoples officially devoted to counter-revolution, to lost causes, to the tawdry ideals of a society of men and masters, and not to the self-reliant freedom alongside of them.

Governor General Adrienne Clarkson quoted Lower at Rideau Hall in an October 2002 speech on the occasion of the presentation of the Public Service Outstanding Achievement Awards: "In every generation Canadians have had to rework the miracle of their political existence. Canada has been created because there has existed within the hearts of its people a determination to build for themselves an enduring home. Canada is a supreme act of faith."

He was elected to the Royal Society of Canada in 1941 and served as its president from 1962 to 1963. In 1968, he was made a Companion of the Order of Canada.

Lower's service medals and academic medals were sold at public auction on 18 March 2012 in Napanee Ontario.

== Selected bibliography ==
- Documents relating to Canadian currency, exchange and finance during the French period, (Ottawa, 1925)
- Select documents in Canadian economic history 1783-1885, (Toronto, 1933). Edited with economic historian Harold Innis
- The North American assault on the Canadian forest: a history of the lumber trade between Canada and the United States, (New Haven, 1938)
- "Two nations or two nationalities", in Culture 4 (1943), 470–481.
- Two ways of life: the primary antithesis of Canadian history, (Ottawa, 1943)
- Colony to Nation: a history of Canada, (Toronto, 1946, 2nd ed., 1949; 3rd ed., 1957; 4th ed., 1964; 5th ed., 1977)
- This Most Famous Stream: the liberal democratic way of life, (Toronto, 1954)
- Canadians in the Making: a social history of Canada, (Toronto, 1958)
- My first seventy-five years, (Toronto, 1967)
- Great Britain's Woodyard: British America and the timber trade 1763–1867, (Montreal, 1973)
- A pattern for history, (Toronto, 1978)

== See also ==
- Governor General's Awards

Professional and academic associations
Preceded by Merton Yarwood Williams	President of the Royal Society of Canada; 1961–1962	Succeeded by William H. Cook
Awards
Preceded by A. LeRoy Burt	J. B. Tyrrell Historical Medal; 1947	Succeeded by Lionel Groulx
