= Fanchon Fröhlich =

American artist (1927–2016)

- Born: Fanchon Angst; 1927; Waterloo, Iowa, US
- Died: 14 June 2016 (aged 88–89)
- Education: Somerville College, Oxford
- Occupation: Artist
- Spouse: Herbert Fröhlich (m. 1950)

Fanchon Fröhlich (née Angst; 1927 – 2016) was an American artist.

== Life ==
Born Fanchon Angst in Waterloo, Iowa as the only child of Joseph Aungst and his wife, Helen, Fröhlich won several scholarships and studied at the University of Chicago under Rudolf Carnap and continued in 1949 at Somerville College, Oxford, studying post-Wittgenstein philosophy of language with P. F. Strawson, gaining a BLitt degree in 1953.

She married physicist Herbert Fröhlich in 1950, whom she met on the boat from America to Liverpool.

As a postgraduate student she began to study at the Liverpool College of Art. She worked with Peter Lanyon in St Ives, Cornwall, in Paris with László Szabó, with Stanley William Hayter in Atelier 17 and with Goto-San in Kyoto, where she went in 1972. She was also a friend of Erwin Schrödinger.

After her husband's death in 1991, she founded Collective Phenomena, working together with abstract artists with music by Lawrence Ball. They exhibited in Paris (under the auspices of John Calder), London and Liverpool.

She wrote publications on philosophy of science and art, and co-written books about Stanley William Hayter and her husband. Fanchon died on 14 June 2016 at the age of 88.
