= Herbert Fröhlich =

British physicist

- Herbert Fröhlich (1905–1991)
- Born: 9 December 1905; Rexingen, Württemberg, German Empire
- Died: 23 January 1991 (aged 86); Liverpool, England, UK
- Education: LMU Munich
- Known for: Bioelectrodynamics; Fröhlich coherence; Fröhlich model; Fröhlich polaron; Fröhlich Hamiltonian; Fröhlich total energy; Fröhlich entropy; Fröhlich free energy; Fröhlich term
- Spouse: Fanchon Fröhlich
- Awards: FRS (1951); Max-Planck Medal (1972)
- Scientific career
- Fields: Physicist
- Workplaces: University of Bristol; University of Liverpool; University of Salford; Ioffe Physico-Technical Institute; University of Freiburg
- Doctoral advisor: Arnold Sommerfeld
- Doctoral students: Sebastian Doniach; Sigurd Zienau
- Other notable students: Brendan Scaife

Notes
- He is the brother of the mathematician Albrecht Fröhlich.

Herbert Fröhlich (9 December 1905 – 23 January 1991) FRS was a German-born British physicist.

== Personal life ==
Fröhlich was born on 9 December 1905 in Rexingen, Baden-Württemberg. He was the son of Fanny Frida (née Schwarz) and Jakob Julius Fröhlich, members of an old-established Jewish family, and the brother of Albrecht Fröhlich, a mathematician who was elected Fellow of the Royal Society in 1976.

== Career ==
In 1927, Fröhlich entered Ludwig-Maximilians-Universität München (LMU Munich) to study physics, and received his doctorate under Arnold Sommerfeld in 1930. His first position was as Privatdozent at the University of Freiburg. Due to rising anti-Semitism and the Deutsche Physik movement under Adolf Hitler, and at the invitation of Yakov Frenkel, Fröhlich went to the Soviet Union, in 1933, to work at the Ioffe Physico-Technical Institute in Leningrad. During the Great Purge following the murder of Sergei Kirov, he fled to England in 1935. Except for a short visit to the Netherlands and a brief internment during World War II, he worked in Nevill Francis Mott's department, at the University of Bristol, until 1948, rising to the position of Reader. At the invitation of James Chadwick, he took the Chair for Theoretical Physics at the University of Liverpool.

In 1950, Bell Telephone Laboratories offered Fröhlich their endowed professorial position at Princeton University. However, at Liverpool he had a purely research post which was attractive to him. He was then newly married to an American, Fanchon Angst, who was studying linguistic philosophy at Somerville College, Oxford under P. F. Strawson, and who did not want to return to the United States at that time.

From 1973, he was Professor of Solid State Physics at the University of Salford, however, all the while maintaining an office at the University of Liverpool, where he gained emeritus status in 1976 and remained there until his death. During 1981, he was a visiting professor at Purdue University. He was nominated for the Nobel Prize in Physics in 1963 and in 1964.

Fröhlich, who pursued theoretical research notably in the fields of superconductivity and bioelectrodynamics, proposed a theory of coherent excitations in biological systems known as Fröhlich coherence. A system that attains this coherent state is known as a Fröhlich condensate, similar to room-temperature non-equilibrium Bose–Einstein condensation of quasiparticles.

== Honours and awards ==
Fröhlich was elected a Fellow of the Royal Society (FRS) in 1951. In 1972, he was awarded the Deutsche Physikalische Gesellschaft Max-Planck Medal and in 1981 an Honorary Doctorate from Purdue University. In 1969, he received an honorary DSc from Trinity College Dublin.

== Books by Fröhlich ==
- Herbert Fröhlich Elektronentheorie der Metalle. (Struktur und Eigenschaften der Materie in Eigendarstellung, Bd.18). (Springer, 1936, 1969)
- Herbert Fröhlich Elektronentheorie der Metalle (Ann Arbor: Edwards Brothers, First US edition, in German, 1943) ISBN 1-114-56648-9
- Herbert Fröhlich Theory of Dielectrics: Dielectric Constant and Dielectric Loss (Clarendon Press, 1949, 1958)
- Herbert Fröhlich and F. Kremer Coherent Excitations in Biological Systems (Springer-Verlag, 1983) ISBN 978-3-642-69186-7
- Herbert Fröhlich, editor Biological Coherence and Response to External Stimuli (Springer, 1988) ISBN 978-3-642-73309-3
