= Alexander Gordon McKay =

Canadian academic

Alexander Gordon "Sandy" McKay
- Born: December 24, 1924; Toronto, Ontario, Canada
- Died: August 31, 2007 (aged 82)
- Awards: Order of Canada

Alexander Gordon "Sandy" McKay, OC FRSC (December 24, 1924 – August 31, 2007) was a Canadian academic who specialized in Vergilian studies.

Born in Toronto, Ontario, McKay graduated from Upper Canada College in 1942. He received a Bachelor of Arts degree in 1946 from the University of Toronto, a Master of Arts degree in 1947 from Yale University, a A.M. degree in 1948 from Princeton University and a Ph.D. in 1950 from Princeton. He started his academic career as an instructor at Princeton University from 1947 to 1949. He then taught at Wells College (1949-1950), the University of Pennsylvania (1950-1951), the University of Manitoba (1951-1952), Mount Allison University (1952-1953), Waterloo College (1953-1955), and again at the University of Manitoba (1955-1957).

He started teaching at McMaster University in 1957. He was appointed an associate professor in 1959, a full professor in 1961, and retired as a Professor Emeritus in 1990. He was chair of Classics from 1962 to 1968 and from 1976 to 1979. From 1968 to 1973, he was the founding dean of the Faculty of Humanities.

He was president of the Royal Society of Canada from 1984 to 1987.

After his retirement from McMaster University in 1990, he taught at York University in Toronto as adjunct professor of humanities from 1990 until 1996.

== Honours ==
In 1965, he was made a Fellow of the Royal Society of Canada. He was a recipient of the Queen Elizabeth II Silver Jubilee Medal, the Canadian Centennial Medal, and the 125th Anniversary of the Confederation of Canada Medal. In 1988, he was made an Officer of the Order of Canada in recognition for being a "distinguished scholar, educator and humanitarian". He received honorary degrees from the University of Manitoba (1986), Brock University (1990), Queen's University (1991), McMaster University (1992), and the University of Waterloo (1993).

== Selected works ==
- Naples and Campania, 1962
- Victorian Architecture in Hamilton, 1967
- Vergil's Italy, 1970
- Ancient Campania, Vols. I and II, 1972
- Houses, Villas, and Palaces in the Roman World, 1975
- Vitruvius, Architect and Engineer, 1978
- Römische Häuser, Villen, und Paläste, 1980
- Roma Antiqua, Latium & Etruria, 1986

Professional and academic associations
| Preceded by Marc-Adélard Tremblay | President of the Royal Society of Canada; 1984–1987 | Succeeded by Digby McLaren |
