= Samuel Edward Dawson =

Canadian businessman, writer and civil servant

- Born: June 1, 1833; Halifax, Nova Scotia, Canada
- Died: February 9, 1916 (aged 82); Westmount, Quebec, Canada
- Occupations: Author businessman civil servant publisher
- Title: President of the Royal Society of Canada
- Term: 1907–1908
- Predecessor: William Saunders
- Successor: Joseph-Edmond Roy

Samuel Edward Dawson CMG FRSC (June 1, 1833 – February 9, 1916) was a Canadian businessman, publisher, author, and civil servant.

Born in Halifax, Nova Scotia, the son of Benjamin Dawson and Elizabeth Gardner, Dawson moved with his family to Montreal in 1847. Dawson worked with his father in his father's bookstore called Benjamin Dawson and Son. After his father retired in 1860, Dawson went into a partnership with his brother and the firm was renamed Dawson Brothers. In 1889, Dawson left the firm.

Dawson was a founder of the Dominion Note Company in 1879 and of the Montreal News Company. In 1891, he was appointed Queen's Printer which was equivalent as a deputy minister. He retired in 1908.

He was created a Companion of the Order of St Michael and St George in 1906. In 1893, he was made a Fellow of the Royal Society of Canada and served as its president from 1907 to 1908.

He died at his home in Westmount on February 9, 1916.

Professional and academic associations
| Preceded by William Saunders | President of the Royal Society of Canada; 1907–1908 | Succeeded by Joseph-Edmond Roy |
