= Nathalie Demassieux =

French chemist (1884–1961)

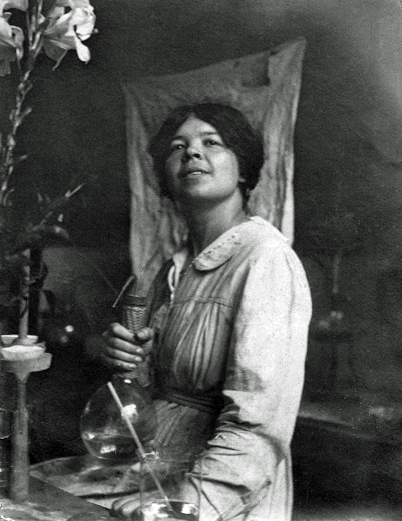
- Demassieux about 1910
- Born: Nathalie Filatoff; August 25, 1884; Tula Oblast, Russian Empire
- Died: May 19, 1961 (aged 76); Paris, France
- Burial place: Père Lachaise Cemetery
- Education: University of Paris
- Spouse: Louis Demassieux
- Scientific career
- Fields: Chemistry
- Workplaces: University of Caen
- Thesis: Les équilibres entre les sels halogènes de plomb et les métaux alcalins (1923)
- Doctoral advisor: Henry Louis Le Chatelier
- Doctoral students: Léon Lortie

Nathalie Demassieux, née Filatoff (25 August 1884 – 19 May 1961), was a Russian-born French chemist and academic who specialised in mineral chemistry. She is remembered for investigating complex halogenated salts of lead and the dehydration of double sulfates, publishing numerous papers in the 1930s. After Irène Joliot-Curie and Pauline Ramart, Demassieux was the third woman to obtain a position as a lecturer (maître de conférences) in a French university. In tribute to her legacy with the Faculty of Sciences of Paris, the Nathalie Demassieux scientific prize was awarded for many years by the Chancellery of the Universities of Paris.

== Early life and education ==
Nathalie Filatoff was born 25 August 1884 in Savenkovo, a small village in Tula Oblast, Russia. Her parents were Wladimir Filatoff, a Russian minor nobleman, and Marine Guelariev, whose father was Polish and whose mother, Adeline Louvier de Balmont, was French. Nathalie Filatoff emigrated to France in 1901 with her brother, Vsevolod Filatoff. They studied together during the school year 1902–1903 at the École pratique des hautes études, section of philological and historical sciences.

Nathalie Filatoff continued her studies at the Sorbonne, where she earned the certificate of higher studies in mineralogy in 1909, the certificate of higher studies in preparatory mathematics in 1910 (one of three women out of 47 candidates), and the certificate of higher studies in general physics in 1912.

She changed her name to Nathalie Demassieux after marrying Louis Demassieux, a professor of chemistry, on 26 August 1909. Her husband was killed on 24 August 1914 near Noërs in the Battle of the Frontiers, during World War I. From 1916 to 1919, Nathalie Demassieux was an auxiliary teacher of mineral chemistry and applied chemistry certificates. After becoming a war widow, she taught chemistry at the technical school from 1919 to 1923.

== Research career ==
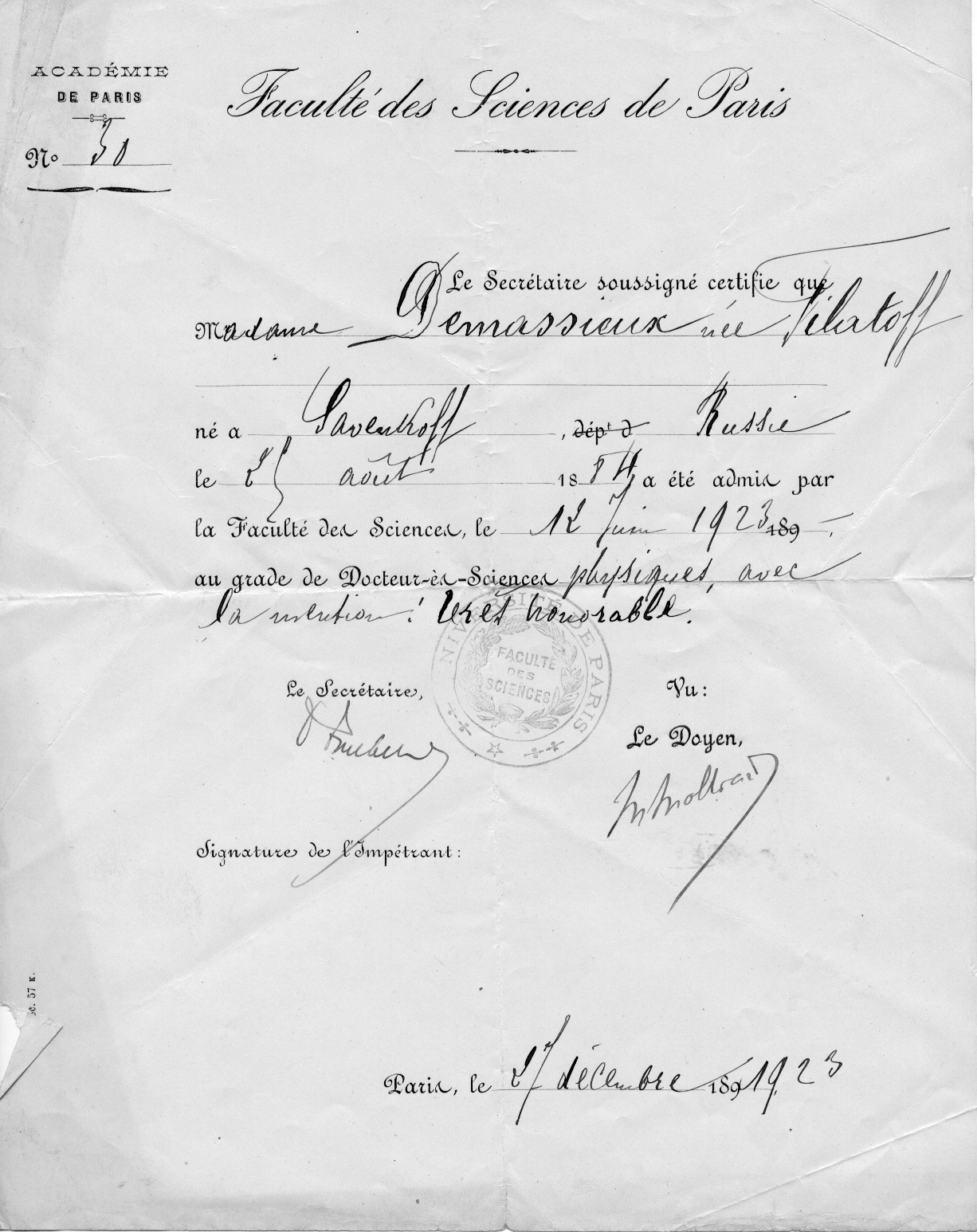
Doctoral dissertation by Nathalie Demassieux, which she defended on 12 June 1923

Before the First World War, Nathalie Demassieux began a thesis on the equilibrium between halogenated lead salts and alkali metals in the laboratory of Léon Ouvrard. After his death during the war, she finished her thesis under the direction of Professor Henry Louis Le Chatelier, chair of general chemistry at the Sorbonne. She became a full assistant at the Sorbonne in 1920. On 12 June 1923, she defended her doctoral thesis in physical sciences at the Faculty of Sciences of the University of Paris. It was titled "Les équilibres entre les sels halogènes de plomb et les métaux alcalins" (The equilibria between lead halide salts and alkali metals). The jury was composed of Georges Urbain, Jean Perrin and Victor Auger for the examiners. That same year, she became a professor of physics and chemistry at the higher primary school of the city of Paris.

During this period, she was also an active feminist, giving a lecture on "Pateur" to the Ligue Française pour le Droit des Femmes in 1923.

In 1925, she was placed on the "aptitude list" to become a lecturer (maître de conférences) by the Advisory Committee for Higher Education. As this was quite unusual for a woman, it created a precedent and was reported in the press, including in the newspaper Le Figaro.

In 1928, she was a chemistry assistant at the Sorbonne when the French Academy of Sciences chose her for the Auguste Cahours prize, for which she received 3,000 francs, "awarded as an encouragement to young people who have already made themselves known by some interesting work and more particularly by research on chemistry". Her work had centred on the equilibrium between lead chloride and various other chlorides.

In 1930, Demassieux obtained a position as a lecturer at the Faculty of Sciences of the University of Caen, becoming only the third woman to obtain a position as a lecturer at a French university, after the chemists Irène Joliot-Curie (Nobel laureate in Chemistry) and Pauline Ramart (who rose to become chair of organic chemistry at the Faculty of Sciences of Paris from 1935 to her death in 1953).

Between 1930 and 1939 Demassieux published numerous articles on the complex halogenated salts of lead, and the dehydration of double sulfates combining potassium and other chemical elements such as copper, nickel, cobalt, potassium or magnesium.

Concerned with popularisation and feminism, she gave lectures, including one on Louis Pasteur given in 1923 during the general assembly of the League for Women's Rights. She was a member of the Ligue Française pour le Droit des Femmes and the Association française pour l'avancement des sciences. She was also active in Soroptimist France, an international network for the promotion of women's professional values.

Aged 76, Nathalie Demassieux died on 19 May 1961 in Paris and is buried there in the Père-Lachaise Cemetery.

== Doctoral students ==
The first doctoral student supervised by Demassieux, Jean Kranig, defended his thesis on the oxalic and carbonic complexes of trivalent cobalt in 1929. She also directed the doctoral research of Léon Lortie, a Canadian chemist who defended his thesis on cerium in 1930. In all, she directed the research of 14 doctoral students.

== Honours and awards ==
In 1928, Desmassieux was awarded a chemistry prize by the French Academy of Sciences in the amount of 3,000 francs.

In 2026, Demassieux was announced as one of 72 historical women in STEM whose names have been proposed to be added to the 72 men already celebrated on the Eiffel Tower. The plan was announced by the Mayor of Paris, Anne Hidalgo following the recommendations of a committee led by Isabelle Vauglin of Femmes et Sciences and Jean-François Martins, representing the operating company which runs the Eiffel Tower.

=== Nathalie Demassieux Award ===
Demassieux was a dedicated researcher throughout her life, directing her doctoral students and publishing more than 30 articles and papers. She became very attached to the Sorbonne laboratory where she spent many hours. As a result, she bequeathed part of her estate to the Faculty of Sciences of Paris in 1959, and this, in turn, led the Chancellery of the Universities of Paris to create the Prix Nathalie Demassieux, later known as the Prix Thiessé de Rosemont / Demassieux. The prize was awarded annually until 2018. Award recipients have included:

- 1988: Brigitte Senut
- 1990: Elyès Jouini
- 1993: Anne Boutin
- 1998: Cécile Murat

== Selected publications ==
- Demassieux, Nathalie: Étude de l’équilibre entre le Chlorure de Plomb et le Chlorhydrate d’Ammoniac en solution aqueuse, Comptes rendus hebdomadaires des séances de l'Académie des sciences, volume 156, 1913, p. 892
- Demassieux, Nathalie: Étude de l’équilibre entre le Chlorure de Plomb et le Chlorure d’Ammonium en solution aqueuse|périodique, Comptes rendus hebdomadaires des séances de l'Académie des Sciences, 158, 1914, p. 702 Nathalie Demassieux, Étude de l’équilibre entre l’Iodure et les Iodures de Potassium et d’Ammonium – entre le Chlorure et l’Iodure de Plomb et quelques Chlorures et Iodures alcalins en solution aqueuse (Study of the equilibrium between Potassium and Ammonium Iodide and Iodide - between Lead Chloride and Iodide and some Alkali Chlorides and Iodides in aqueous solution), Ann. de Chimie, vol. 177, 1923, p. 51
- Demassieux Nathalie: Action de l’acide oxalique sur quelques sels solubles de Plomb (Action of oxalic acid on some soluble lead salts), C. R. Acad. Sc., vol. 185, 1927, p. 460
- Demassieux, Nathalie and Heyrovsky, J. Reduction of some complex salts at the dropping mercury cathode, Vestnik IV, Pragues, 1928
- Demassieux, Nathalie: Action des carbonates alcalins sur le bromure, l'iodure et le nitrate de plomb, sur le Chlorure de Plomb, en solution aqueuse (Action of alkaline carbonates on lead bromide, iodide and nitrate, on lead chloride, in aqueous solution), C. R. Acad. Sc., vol. 189, 1929, p. 333 et 428
- Demassieux, Nathalie: Action des oxalates alcalins sur les sels halogénés de Plomb (Action of alkaline oxalates on halogenated lead salts), C. R. Acad. Sc., vol. 189, 1929, p. 535
- Demassieux, Nathalie and Heyrovsky, J,: Etude de quelques complexes par la méthode polarographique (Study of some complexes by the polarographic method), Bull. Soc. Chimie, vol. 45-46, 1929, p. 30
- Demassieux, Nathalie: Contribution à l’étude du chrome trivalent (Contribution to the study of trivalent chromium), Jour. Soc. Chim. Phys., vol. 26, 1929, p. 219
