= Joseph-Edmond Roy =

Canadian historian and politician (1858–1913)

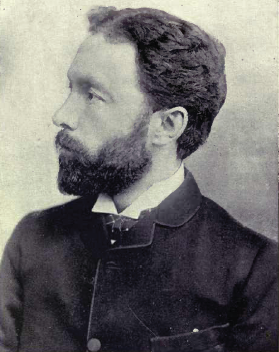
- Born: December 7, 1858; Pointe-Lévy (Lévis), Lower Canada
- Died: May 8, 1913 (aged 54); Lévis, Quebec
- Occupations: editor, notary, politician, historian, and office holder

Joseph-Edmond Roy (December 7, 1858 – May 8, 1913) was a Quebec notary, editor, historian and political figure.

He was born in Pointe-Lévy in 1858, the son of notary Léon Roy. Roy studied at the Collège de Lévis and the Séminaire de Québec, finally studying law at the Université Laval. He became editor of Le Quotidien at Lévis in 1879. Roy was licensed as a notary in 1880 and set up practice at Lévis. He ran unsuccessfully for a seat in the legislative assembly in 1883 and 1886. In 1885, he married Lucienne Carrier. He was a member of the Royal Society of Canada, serving as president from 1897 to 1898 and from 1905 to 1906. He also served as a member of the Quebec Provincial Board of Notaries and was president from 1909 to 1912. In 1896, Roy ran unsuccessfully for a seat in the House of Commons in Bellechasse. In the same year, he was elected to the city council for Lévis and served as mayor from 1896 to 1900.

During the period 1897 to 1904, he published the five-volume Histoire de la seigneurie de Lauzon. Roy also contributed to the historical journal Bulletin des recherches historiques, edited by his brother Pierre-Georges. In 1898, he became editor and publisher for La Revue du notariat at Lévis. From 1899 to 1902, he published the four-volume Histoire du notariat au Canada depuis la fondation de la colonie jusqu'à nos jours, a history of the notarial profession in Canada. In 1907, he became a professor of Canadian geography at the Université Laval. Roy was appointed head of the manuscript division of the archives at Ottawa the following year.

He died at Lévis in 1913.

Professional and academic associations
Preceded by Samuel Edward Dawson	President of the Royal Society of Canada; 1908–1909	Succeeded by George Bryce
