= Maurice Lebel =

Canadian academic (1909–2006)

- Born: December 24, 1909; Saint-Lin, Quebec, Canada
- Died: April 24, 2006 (aged 96)
- Education: Université de Montréal; Université Laval; Sorbonne; University of London; University of Athens
- Occupation: Academic
- Employer: Université Laval
- Awards: Order of Canada; National Order of Quebec

Maurice Lebel, OC OQ FRSC (December 24, 1909 – April 24, 2006) was a Canadian academic.

Born in Saint-Lin, Quebec, he received a Bachelor of Arts degree in 1928 from Université de Montréal and a Master of Arts degree in 1930 from Université Laval. In 1931, he received a Diplôme d'Études Supérieures in language and classical literature from the Sorbonne. In 1932, he received a Diploma in language and English literature and a Bachelor of Arts degree in 1935 from the University of London. He received a Ph.D. in education in 1952 and a D.Litt. from the University of Athens in 1957.

From 1937 to 1975, he was a professor of language and Greek literature at Université Laval. From 1957 to 1963, he was the dean of the Faculty of Letters. From 1963 to 1964, he was the president of the Royal Society of Canada (he was made a Fellow in 1947) and was awarded the Pierre Chauveau Medal in 1962.

In 1967, he was made an Officer of the Order of Canada. In 1994, he was made an Officer of the National Order of Quebec.

Professional and academic associations
Preceded by William H. Cook	President of the Royal Society of Canada; 1963–1964	Succeeded by Léo Marion
