= William Harrison Cook =

British-Canadian chemist (1903–1998)

- Born: September 2, 1903; Alnwick, England
- Died: May 19, 1998 (aged 94); Ottawa, Ontario
- Occupation: biochemist
- Known for: Executive Director of the National Research Council
- Awards: Order of Canada; Order of the British Empire

William Harrison Cook, OC OBE FRSC (September 2, 1903 – May 19, 1998) was an English Canadian food technologist and biochemist. He was executive director of the National Research Council.

Born in Alnwick, England, Cook immigrated to Canada in 1912. After graduating from the School of Agriculture in Claresholm, Alberta, the University of Alberta and Stanford University with a Ph.D. in chemistry, he starting working for National Research Council's applied biology division focusing on the transport of perishable foods and refrigerated storage. In 1941, he became director of the division and was in charge of research on the preservation and transportation of bacon, poultry and eggs during World War II.

== Honours ==
In 1969, he was made an Officer of the Order of Canada. He was awarded an honorary doctorate degree from the University of Saskatchewan in 1948 in recognition of "his eminent service to agricultural science".

Professional and academic associations
| Preceded by Arthur R. M. Lower | President of the Royal Society of Canada; 1962–1963 | Succeeded by Maurice Lebel |
