= British Columbia Historical Federation =

Canadian historical society

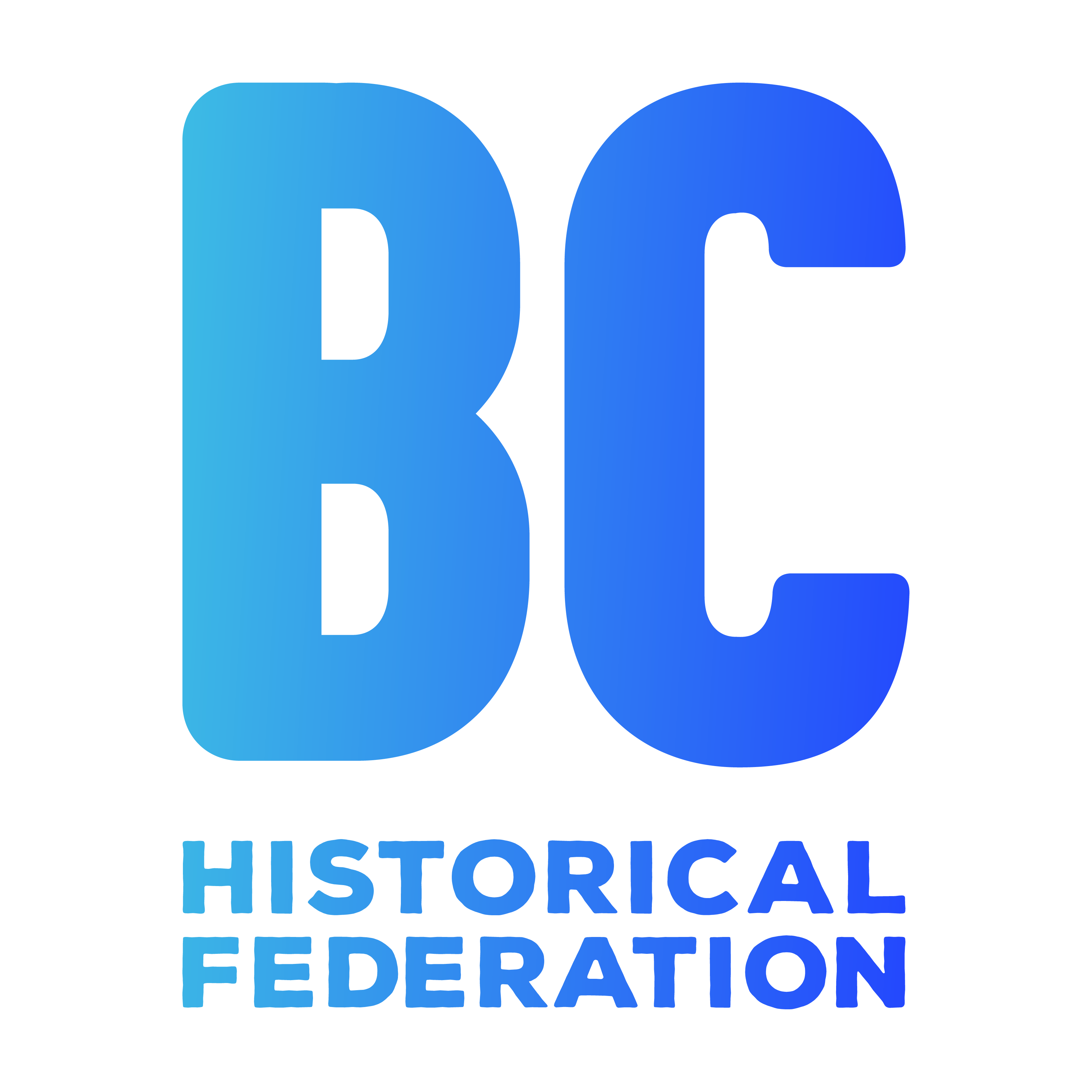
Logo of the British Columbia Historical Federation

The British Columbia Historical Federation (formerly The British Columbia Historical Association) is a nonprofit Canadian historical society. Established in 1922, it was registered under the Societies Act in 1927.

== History ==
The British Columbia Historical Association was established on October 12, 1922, and on March 2, 1927, the Association was registered under the Societies Act. It was renamed to the British Columbia Historical Federation on July 29, 1983.

== Publications ==
The British Columbia Historical Federation publishes a monthly newsletter and articles on its website. Its quarterly magazine, British Columbia History, is dedicated solely to the history of the province of British Columbia.

In 1923, the British Columbia Historical Association published its First Annual Report and Proceedings, edited by Walter Noble Sage. In 1937, it evolved into the British Columbia Historical Quarterly edited by W.K. Lamb. After a 10 year hiatus, the British Columbia Historical News appeared in the spring of 1968. Early issues included news from member societies and of local historical interest as well as a feature article. As the journal matured it published fewer news items and more feature articles, so to reflect this change the title was revised to British Columbia History in 2005. All of these publications from 1923 to 2015 have now been digitized and made available to researchers online through a partnership with UBC Library. British Columbia History is a member of the Magazine Association of British Columbia.

Magazine editors
Year	Publication	Editor
1923-1926	First Annual Report and Proceedings	W.N. Sage
1927-1929	Reports and Proceedings	Donald A. Fraser
1937-1946	British Columbia Historical Quarterly	W.K. Lamb
1947–1958	British Columbia Historical Quarterly	Willard E. Ireland
1968-1977	BC Historical News	Philip Yandle
1977-1980	BC Historical News	Kent Haworth, Patricia Roy & Terry Eastwood
1983–1986	BC Historical News	Marie Elliott
1986	BC Historical News - Vancouver Centennial Issue	Esther Birney
1986–1988	BC Historical News	R.J.C. Tyrrell
1988–1999	BC Historical News	Naomi Miller
1999–2003	BC Historical News	Fred Braches
2003–2009	British Columbia History	John Atkin
2010	British Columbia History - Transportation Issue	Barrie Sanford, guest editor
2011	British Columbia History - Education Issue	Dr. Penney Clark, guest editor
2010-2020	British Columbia History	Andrea Lister
2021-	British Columbia History	K. Jane Watt (Managing Editor)

K. Jane Watt is the current Managing Editor of British Columbia History magazine. Guest editors are now brought on for each issue.

=== BCHF Buzz ===
In order to provide timely information to member societies, the British Columbia Historical Federation newsletter has been issued since June 2003. 42 issues of the newsletter were edited and produced by Ron Hyde from 2003 to 2013. The newsletter is now delivered electronically. The BCHF Buzz provides monthly information and is a forum for member societies to publicize events and activities. The BCHF Buzz is emailed to all BCHF members. Laura VanZant (Revelstoke) is the editor.

== Presidents ==
Presidents
Year	President
1922–1925	Judge F.W. Howay
1926–1927	John Hosie
1928–1929	V.L. Denton
1930–1935	Unknown
1936–1937	William Kaye Lamb
1938	Dr. Walter Noble Sage
1939	J.S. Plaskett
1940	T.A. Rickard
1941	Kenneth A. Waites
1942	J.C. Goodfellow
1943–1944	B.A. McKelvie
1945	Helen R. Boutilier
1946	Madge Wolfenden
1947	George B. White
1948	W.E. Ireland
1949	Dr. Margaret Ormsby
1950	Burt R. Campbell
1951	Maj. H.C. Holmes
1952	D.A. McGregor
1953	H.C. Gilliland
1954	Capt. C.W. Cates
1955	Elsie Turnbull
1956	Russell Potter
1957	W.N. Sage
1958-60	Lois Haggen
1961	F.H. Johnson
1962	John E. Gibbard
1963	Maj. H.C. Holmes
1964-66	Donald New
1967-69	Mabel Jordon
1970-71	H.R. Brammall
1972-73	Col. G.S. Andrews
1974-75	Frank Street
1976-77	A.G. Slocomb
1978	Helen B. Akrigg
1979-80	Ruth Barnett
1981-83	Barbara Stannard
1984-85	Leonard G. McCann
1986-87	Naomi Miller
1988-90	John D. Spittle
1991-93	Myrtle Haslam
1994-96	Alice Glanville
1997-99	R.J. (Ron) Welwood
2000-02	Wayne Desrochers
2003-05	Jacqueline Gresko
2006-07	Patricia Roy
2008-10	Ron Greene
2011-12	Barbara Hynek
2013	Barry Gough
2014	Gary Mitchell
2015-18	K. Jane Watt
2019-22	Shannon Bettles
2022-25	Rosa Flinton-Brown
2025-	Sarah Ling 凌慧意

== Conferences ==
The British Columbia Historical Federation holds an annual conference typically along with its Annual General Meeting (AGM). The conference includes presentations about British Columbia history, field trips to historical places, sites, museums, archives, and monuments, social events, and an annual awards dinner.

Year	Dates	Location	Theme
2027	TBA	Vernon	TBA
2026	May 30	Vancouver	Layered Histories: Hard Conversations
2025	May 1-4	Williams Lake	Reconciliation
2024	May 4	Chilliwack / Ts'elxwéyeqw	Bringing History Home
2023	July 20-23	Princeton	
2022	June 2-5	Victoria (virtual only)	Memory
2021	June 3-5	Surrey (virtual only)	Connections
2020		Cancelled due to COVID 19	
2019	June 6-9	Courtenay, Comox, Cumberland	Who's taking care of our history?
2018	May 24-27	Nakusp	History. Springs. Eternal
2017	May 25-28	Chilliwack	Land, Water, People
2016	May 26-29	Revelstoke	
2015	May 21-23	Quesnel	Journey to the Cariboo
2014		Cloverdale	
2013	May 9-12	Kamloops	
2012	May 3-10	Campbell River	
2011	May 5	Powell River	
2010	May 6	Vancouver	
2009		Nelson	
2008		New Westminster	
2007		Victoria	
2006		Kimberley	
2005		Kelowna	
2004		Nanaimo	
2003		Prince George	
2002		Revelstoke	
2001		Richmond	
2000		Port Alberni	
1999		Merrit	
1998		Surrey	
1997		Nelson	
1996		Williams Lake	
1995		Chilliwack	
1994		Parksville / Quallicum	
1993		Kamloops	
1992		Burnaby	
1991		Duncan	
1990		Grand Forks	
1989		Victoria	
1988		Banff, Alberta (joint BC-Alberta conference)	
1987		Mission	
1986		Vancouver (University of British Columbia)	
1985		Galiano Island	
1984		Vernon	
1983		New Westminster	
1982		Duncan (Cowichan Bay)	
1981		Cranbrook	
1980		Princeton	
1979		Nanaimo	
1978		Burnaby (Simon Fraser University)	
1977		Burnaby	
1976		Victoria	
1975		Campbell River	
1974		Cranbrook	
1973		Vancouver (UBC)	
1972		Port Alberni	
1971		Victoria	
1970		Nanaimo	
1969		Penticton	
1968		Victoria	
