= University of Toronto School of Graduate Studies =

Graduate school of the University of Toronto

Coordinates: 43.661740°N 79.397027°W

- Former name: Board of Graduate Studies (1915–1922)
- Type: Public graduate school
- Established: April 27, 1922 (104 years ago)
- Parent institution: University of Toronto
- Dean: Joshua Barker
- Postgraduates: 21,480
- Location: Greater Toronto Area, Ontario, Canada
- Website: sgs.utoronto.ca

The School of Graduate Studies (SGS) is the graduate school of the University of Toronto in Ontario, Canada. It is among the largest graduate schools in Canada with more than 20,000 full-time students. SGS is a tri-campus administrative entity responsible for all master's and doctoral programs at the University of Toronto, overseeing programs tied to the university's academic divisions and units, across all three campuses: Mississauga, St. George, and Scarborough.

== History ==
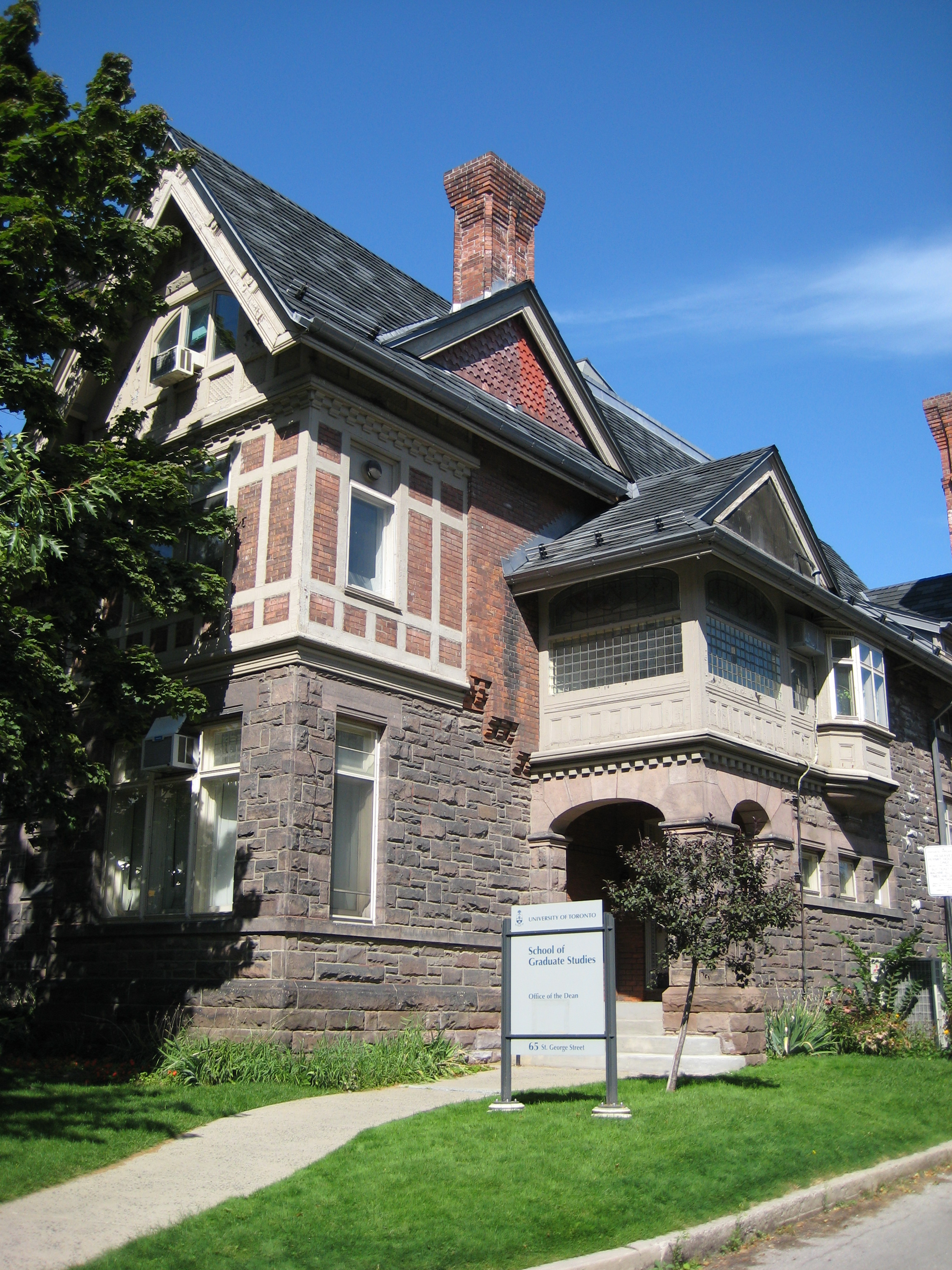
The Graduate Studies dean's office building on the St. George campus

Master of Arts degrees have been conferred by the University of Toronto since the first convocation of King's College on December 20, 1844. However, the first PhD was not awarded until 1897. The PhD – advocated for by Archibald Macallum, founder of the National Research Council Canada, and introduced by president James Loudon – was proceeded by the Doctor of Medicine (MD) and Doctor of Dental Surgery (DDS), but was the first research doctorate requiring a thesis offered by the university. U of T's first PhD was completed by Frederick Scott in physiology. In 1903, Clara Benson and Emma Sophia Baker became the first women to receive PhDs from the university, and a total of 40 were conferred from 1897 to 1921. Fellowships were donated by businesses such as the Canadian Pacific Railway and Imperial Oil. PhDs were initially offered by only seven departments: four science departments, Oriental languages and literature, philosophy, and political science. Academic standards were then the responsibility of individual departments, under the supervision of an ad hoc committee appointed by the senate.

U of T's introduction of the PhD, a degree only offered by select (mainly American) universities at the time, was met with some opposition; The Varsity, for example, published concerns about a lack of resources in an "earnest protest against the University attempting to dabble in postgraduate courses until she is doing her undergraduate work thoroughly, and has energy and money to spare."

In 1915, Macallum led the creation of a board of graduate studies. He advocated for the development of graduate schools at both U of T and McGill University that would be at the level of peer institutions in the United States. J. Playfair McMurrich became chair of the board in 1919. A 1921 royal commission on the value of graduate studies and research led by The Reverend Henry John Cody advocated for increased graduate research. The following year, the discovery of insulin at the University of Toronto, along with the commission, persuaded the university's board of governors to approve a School of Graduate Studies a week after the discovery was announced.

The Cody royal commission suggested that the School also be responsible for all research at the university, a proposal agreed on by physicist John Cunningham McLennan; however, it was rejected by the senate. When McMurrich retired in 1930 McLennan took over as dean of Graduate Studies.

Amid international student visa restrictions in the United States in 2025, the School of Graduate Studies in partnership with the Munk School of Global Affairs and Public Policy made a plan with Harvard University to allow international students from Harvard's John F. Kennedy School of Government to complete their studies at the University of Toronto. The deal received considerable news coverage.

== Academics ==
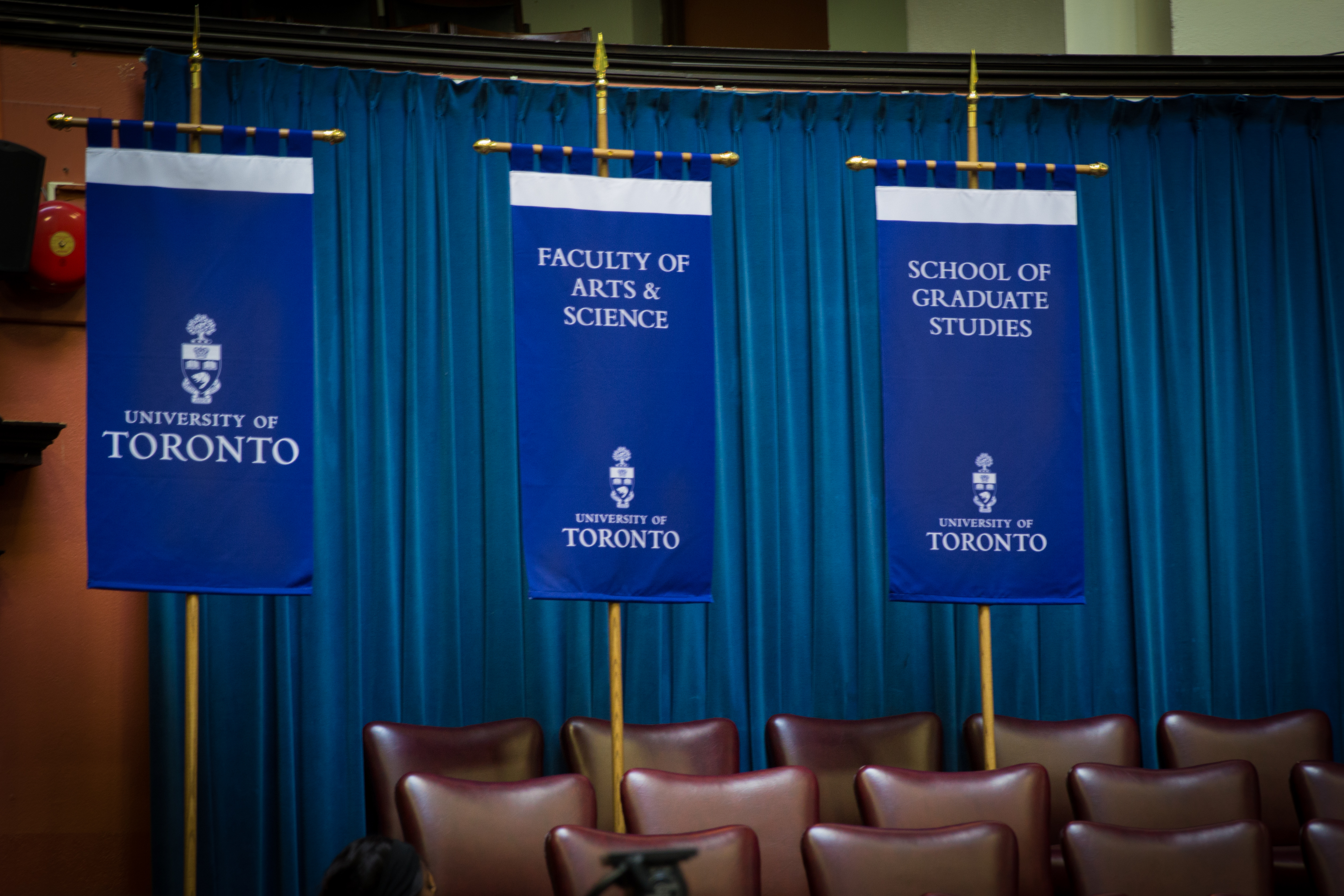
An SGS gonfalon displayed next to a Faculty of Arts and Science gonfalon during a convocation ceremony

Unlike their undergraduate counterparts, graduate programs are largely not fixed to any of the University of Toronto's three campuses. All graduate programs are administered by the School of Graduate Studies through various graduate units (sometimes called graduate departments), administrative entities composed of graduate faculty members, graduate students, and administrative staff, led by graduate chairs. In contrast to budgetary academic units, graduate units do not themselves hold faculty or staff, and instead depend on budgetary academic units such as the University of Toronto's academic divisions or departments within divisions. The administrative home of most graduate units is on the St. George campus, and there is a growing number of appointments to these units of faculty members based on the Mississauga and Scarborough campuses.

The School of Graduate Studies offers more than 175 programs divided into four groups, also known as "divisions": humanities, social sciences, physical sciences, and life sciences. Programs include architecture, landscape, and design; biomedical communications; dentistry; education; forestry; information; law; management; medical radiation sciences; medicine; nursing; occupational science and occupational therapy; pharmacy; physical therapy; public health; social work; and speech-language pathology.

== Facilities ==
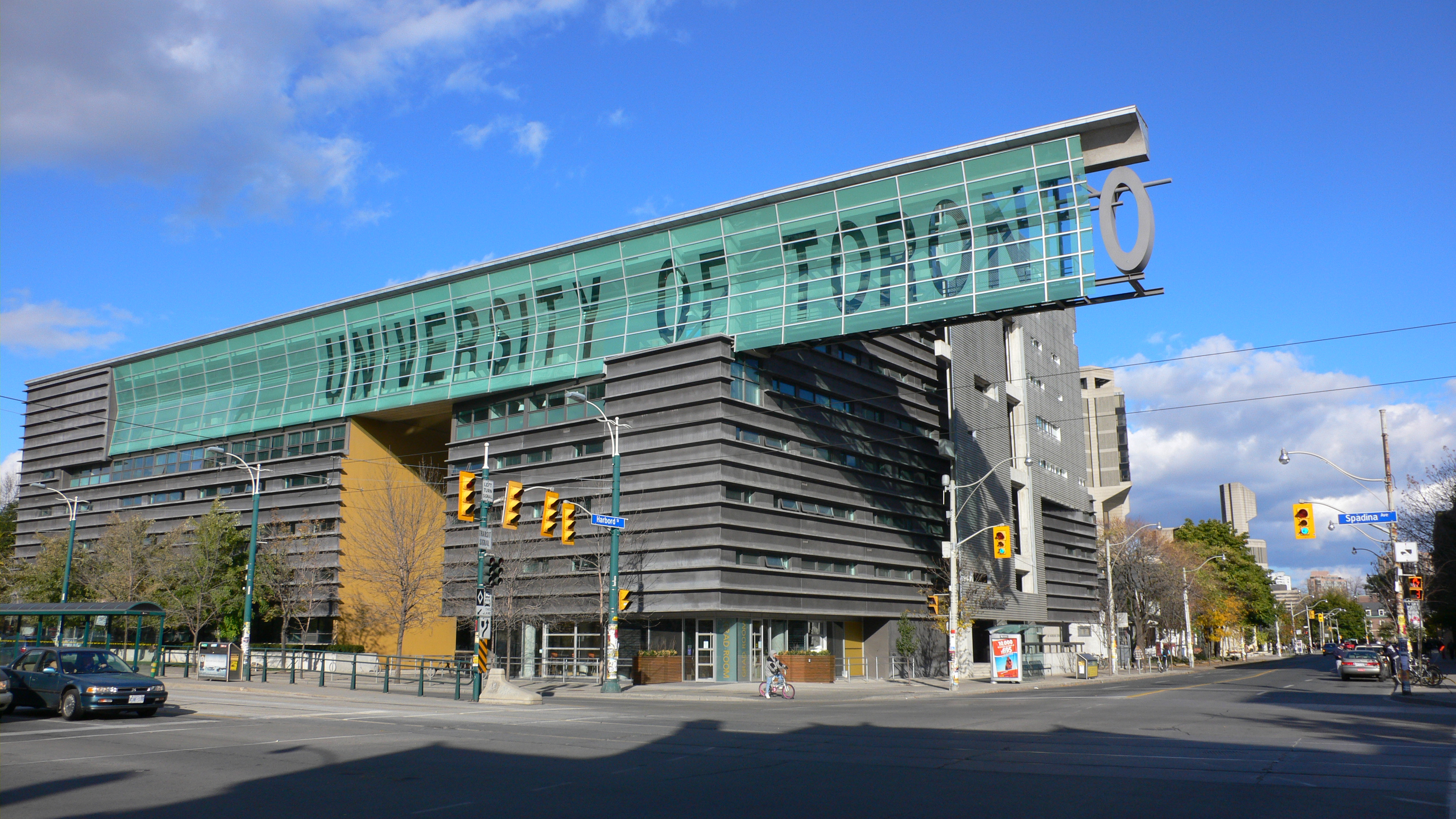
Graduate House, built in 2000 on the St. George campus

In 1910, Knox College acquired the former home of Sir John A. Macdonald, the first prime minister of Canada, located at 63 St. George Street in Toronto on what is now the University of Toronto's St. George campus. Built in 1872, the building has served as a place where doctoral students defend their theses and a space for graduate student services. In 2000, Graduate House opened at 60 Harbord Street as an all-graduate residence designed by Thom Mayne.

SGS students may choose to affiliate with Massey College, an independent residential college that serves as a residence and academic community for University of Toronto graduate students, located on the St. George campus in downtown Toronto.

== Graduate Students' Union ==
The University of Toronto Graduate Students' Union (UTGSU or simply GSU) is the representative student committee for graduate students at all three campuses, founded in 1964.
