= Wilfrid Eggleston =

Canadian journalist (1901–1986)

- Born: 25 March 1901; Lincoln, England
- Died: 13 June 1986 (aged 85); Ottawa, Ontario, Canada
- Education: Regina College; Queen's University; University of Alberta
- Occupations: Journalist, author, civil servant
- Spouse: Magdalena Raškevičiutė (m. 1928)
- Scientific career
- Workplaces: Carleton University

Wilfrid Eggleston OBE (25 March 1901 – 13 June 1986) was an Anglo-Canadian journalist, author and civil servant. Born in Lincoln to middle-class English parents, he relocated to Netherfield, Nottinghamshire where his father was convinced to move the family to a ranch in Orion, Alberta. Suffering from boredom in his teenage years, Eggleston advanced his basic English education through a fast-track course at Regina College, which qualified his entrance to Queen's University in 1926. Graduating in 1928, he found journalistic work at the Lethbridge Herald before occupying his role as Ottawa correspondent for the Toronto Star by the following year, becoming parliamentary correspondent before his resignation in 1936.

Joining the civil service through his productive membership of the secretariat in the Rowell-Sirois Commission of 1937, the Canadian government entrusted him with the position of Chief Censor of the nation in 1942 to combat negative coverage of Canada's role in the Second World War at home and overseas. Resigning in 1944, much to the regret of the authorities, Eggleston found work as an academic at Carleton University in 1947, establishing the Carleton School of Journalism upon accepting his lectureship; he directed the faculty until 1966. Eggleston died in Ottawa on 13 June 1986 at the age of 85.

== Early life ==
Wilfrid Eggleston was born on 25 March 1901 in Lincoln to English parents who had moved from Spalding two years earlier, where his older sister Margaret had been born. His father was a former tax collector, his mother, a shop assistant and dressmaking apprentice; they had married in Grantham come 1897 after meeting as choristers in the town's Methodist chapel. Eggleston's father, one of nine children from a Nottinghamshire farm, relocated the family regularly through his successful work at an insurance firm. His mother, similarly privileged, is said to have received an education from a "Victorian private school for young ladies". The family purchased a grocer's shop in Netherfield, Nottinghamshire, briefly resettling there until 1909. During this short period, Wilfrid was educated at the newly established Chandos Street School, which amalgamated in 1973 to form Carlton le Willows School.

Following this, Wilfrid moved to a ranch in the emerging settlement of Orion, Alberta with his family on the advice of a neighbor; the farming of wheat was a predominant activity. However, following a major crop failure in 1917, he became the town's bank clerk after employment in a convenience store, but later left for Kronau, Saskatchewan due to a combination of poor business and boredom; the family ranch was later abandoned in 1923. After skipping several years of high school education through a fast-track course at Regina College, Eggleston enrolled for a Bachelor of Arts program at Queen's University in 1926.

== Career ==
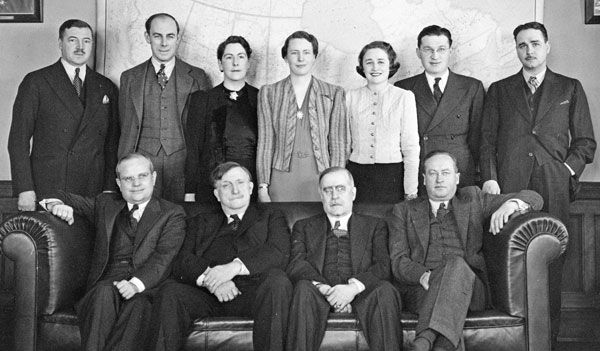
The Rowell–Sirois Commission of 1937, Eggleston is pictured second from the left on the back row

After graduating from Queen's in 1928, Wilfrid Eggleston began writing for the locally printed Lethbridge Herald. He wrote under Canadian Senator William Ashbury Buchanan, whom had acquired ownership of the newspaper in 1905. Eggleston held Buchanan and his politics in high regard during his short stay at the publication. After just one year writing in Lethbridge, he became Ottawa correspondent for the Toronto Star in 1929, and witnessed significant political events in this position, including the passing of the Statute of Westminster in 1931 and the British Empire Economic Conference of 1932. He also began writing through the media agency Reuters in the late 1920s by means of a syndicated weekly newspaper column, with a selection of his political pieces featuring in Time Magazine and a plethora of other noted publications. By the time Eggleston had resigned from the Toronto Star in 1936, he had risen to become the newspaper's parliamentary correspondent; he'd finished reporting through Reuters within the same year.

Whilst maintaining his journalistic status as a freelance reporter, he began governmental service in 1937. He was a member of the secretariat in the Rowell–Sirois Commission, which sought to ease the encumbrance of the Great Depression by analyzing perceived flaws in the Canadian constitution. The outcome of the commission, supported by Eggleston, allowed for greater involvement in regard to unemployment insurance and pensions from the federal government. During this time he liaised with notable figures including Newton Rowell, James McGregor Stewart and Henry Angus (all of whom were also members of the venture).

After gaining the trust of the Canadian government, he became Chief Censor for war-time Canada from 1942 until 1944; Eggleston's predecessor, Major James Haig-Smith, was ordered to ban some 600 published works due to leftist sympathies. Among the high-profile censorship requests that Eggleston didn't oblige to include the Battle of the St. Lawrence, after he discovered that it was merely an attempt to, as he put it, "give the Minister of Naval Affairs a scoop when he announced it to the House", and the Conscription Crisis of 1944, to which he was personally objected, despite pressure from then Prime Minister, Mackenzie King. Upon being discharged from the post, General Léo Richer Laflèche commented in the Ottawa Citizen that he was "largely responsible for the efficient functioning of censorship in Canada". He was succeeded in the role by fellow journalist Fulgence Charpentier.

Later in life, Wilfrid was involved in more academic pursuits. He had received a basic teacher-training education from the Calgary Normal School (latterly a part of the University of Alberta), and taught for some years in the Golden Prairie School District before lecturing at Carleton University in 1947. In the same year, he became founder and director of the Carleton School of Journalism, a post he held until 1966. The Canadian Encyclopedia claims that Eggleston "was considered the father of journalism education in Canada, emphasizing its roots in the liberal arts and social sciences".

== Honours, recognition and death ==
He was made an Officer of the Order of the British Empire in 1943 by George VI in the Birthday Honours of that year, shortly after resigning his censor post. Approaching the conclusion of the Second World War, Eggleston made several public appearances in his native United Kingdom on behalf of the Ministry of Information, including at the White Rock Pavilion on 20 April 1945, where he expressed Canadian support for the British war effort, with particular admiration for the Battle of Britain.

Becoming a prominent author on Canadian history and politics upon retirement from the civil service, Eggleston earned the recognition of the Writers' Guild of Alberta, which established the 'Wilfrid Eggleston Award for Nonfiction' in 1982. Dying in Ottawa on 13 June 1986 at 85 years of age, Eggleston's extensive book collection of some 3,000 works was donated to the University of Lethbridge in 2006, despite interest from Carleton and Queen's universities, his academic institution and alma mater respectively.

== Published works ==
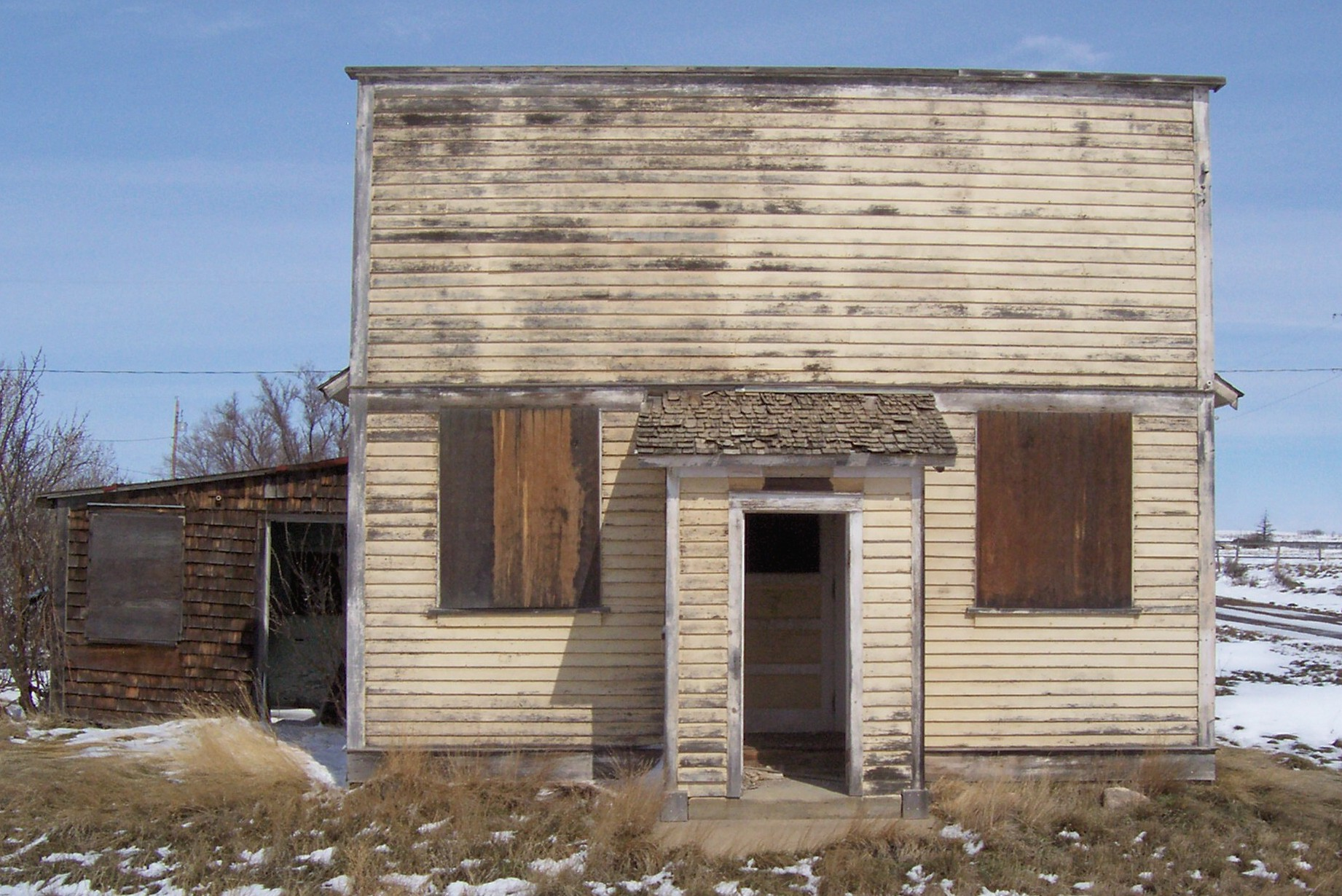
A ramshackle store in Orion, Alberta; Eggleston wrote at length about the hardships of ranching in the hamlet in two of his memoirs

Eggleston published a total of 17 books throughout his life; these included seven on Canadian history, five on its politics and three personal memoirs. He further published poetry anthologies in 1927, and again in 1978 with his wife Magdalena Raškevičiutė, herself a noted Lithuanian-Canadian author, to commemorate their fiftieth wedding anniversary. Their daughter, classical pianist and composer Anne Eggleston (1934 – 1994), became a distinguished contemporary of Robert Fleming, John Weinzweig, Oskar Morawetz and Godfrey Ridout, through her association with The Royal Conservatory of Music.

History

- The High Plains (1938)
- Why & How Canada Federated (1947)
- The Green Gables Letters: From L. M. Montgomery to Ephraim Weber, 1905–1909 (1960)
- Newfoundland: the Road to Confederation (1974)
- The Frontier and Canadian Letters (1977)
- Prairie Symphony (1978)
- National Research in Canada: The NRC 1916–1966 (1978)

Politics

- The Road to Nationhood: a Chronicle of Dominion-Provincial Relations (1946)
- Scientists at War (1950)
- Canada at Work (1953)
- The Queen's Choice: a Story of Canada's Capital (1961)
- Canada's Nuclear Story (1966)

Memoirs

- While I Still Remember: a Personal Record (1968)
- Literary Friends (1980)
- Homestead on the Range (1982)

Poetry

- Prairie Moonlight and other Lyrics (1927)
- Lyrics by Magdalena and Wilfrid Eggleston (1978)
