= John Craigie =

John Craigie may refer to:

- John Craigie (cricketer), Australian cricketer
- John Craigie (politician), businessman and political figure in colonial Quebec and Lower Canada
- John Craigie (musician), American singer-songwriter
- John Hubert Craigie, Canadian plant pathologist
