= Kenneth B. Storey =

Canadian scientist (born 1949)

Kenneth Storey FRSC
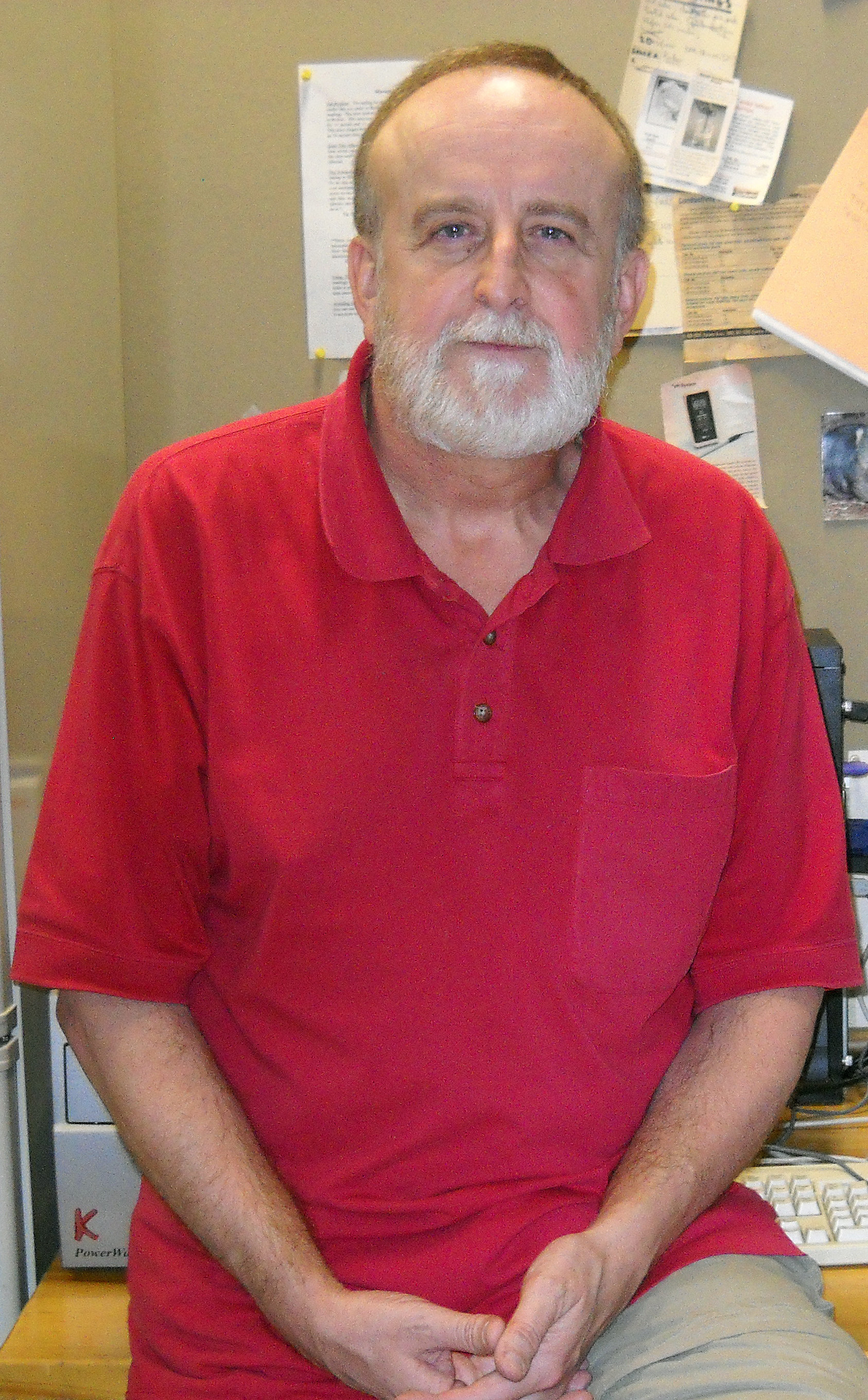
- Born: Kenneth Bruce Storey; October 23, 1949; Taber, Alberta, Canada
- Died: July 5 2025; Ottawa, Ontario, Canada
- Awards: Royal Society of Canada Fellow (1990); Flavelle Medal (2010); Fry Medal (2011); Cryo-Fellow (2012)
- Scientific career
- Fields: Molecular Physiology; Biochemistry; Biochemical Adaptation
- Institutions: Carleton University, Canada
- Doctoral advisor: Peter Hochachka

Kenneth B. Storey FRSC (October 23, 1949 - July 5, 2025) was a Canadian scientist whose work drew from a variety of fields including biochemistry and molecular biology. He was a Professor of Biology, Biochemistry and Chemistry at Carleton University in Ottawa, Canada. Storey has a world-wide reputation for his research on biochemical adaptation—the molecular mechanisms that allow animals to adapt to and endure severe environmental stresses such as deep cold, oxygen deprivation, and desiccation.

== Biography ==
Kenneth Storey studied biochemistry at the University of Calgary (B.Sc. '71) and zoology at the University of British Columbia (Ph.D. '74). Storey was a Professor of Biochemistry, cross-appointed in the Departments of Biology, Chemistry and Neuroscience and held the Canada Research Chair in Molecular Physiology at Carleton University in Ottawa, Canada.

Storey was an elected fellow of the Royal Society of Canada, of the Society for Cryobiology and of the American Association for the Advancement of Science. He has won fellowships and awards for research excellence including the Fry medal from the Canadian Society of Zoologists (2011), the Flavelle medal from the Royal Society of Canada (2010), Ottawa Life Sciences Council Basic Research Award (1998), a Killam Senior Research Fellowship (1993–1995), the Ayerst Award from the Canadian Society for Molecular Biosciences (1989), an E.W.R. Steacie Memorial Fellowship from the Natural Sciences and Engineering Research Council of Canada (1984–1986), and four Carleton University Research Achievement Awards. Storey is the author of over 1200 research articles, the editor of seven books, has given over 500 talks at conferences and institutes worldwide, and organized numerous international symposia.

== Research ==
Storey's research includes studies of enzyme properties, gene expression, protein phosphorylation, epigenetics, and cellular signal transduction mechanisms to seek out the basic principles of how organisms endure and flourish under extreme conditions. He is particularly known within the field of cryobiology for his studies of animals that can survive freezing, especially the frozen "frog-sicles" (Rana sylvatica) that have made his work popular with multiple TV shows and magazines. Storey's studies of the adaptations that allow frogs, insects, and other animals to survive freezing have made major advances in the understanding of how cells, tissues and organs can endure freezing. Storey was also responsible for the discovery that some turtle species are freeze tolerant: newly hatched painted turtles that spend their first winter on land (Chrysemys picta marginata & C.p. bellii). These turtles are unique as they are the only reptiles, and highest vertebrate life form, known to tolerate prolonged natural freezing of extracellular body fluids during winter hibernation. These advances may aid the development of organ cryopreservation technology. A second area of his research is metabolic rate depression—understanding the mechanisms by which some animals can reduce their metabolism and enter a state of hypometabolism or torpor that allows them to survive prolonged environmental stresses. His studies have identified molecular mechanisms that underlie metabolic arrest across phylogeny and that support phenomena including mammalian hibernation, estivation, and anoxia- and ischemia-tolerance. These studies hold key applications for medical science, particularly for preservation technologies that aim to extend the survival time of excised organs in cold or frozen storage. Additional applications include insights into hyperglycemia in metabolic syndrome and diabetes, and anoxic and ischemic damage caused by heart attack and stroke. Furthermore, Storey's lab has created several web based programs freely available for data management, data plotting, and microRNA analysis.

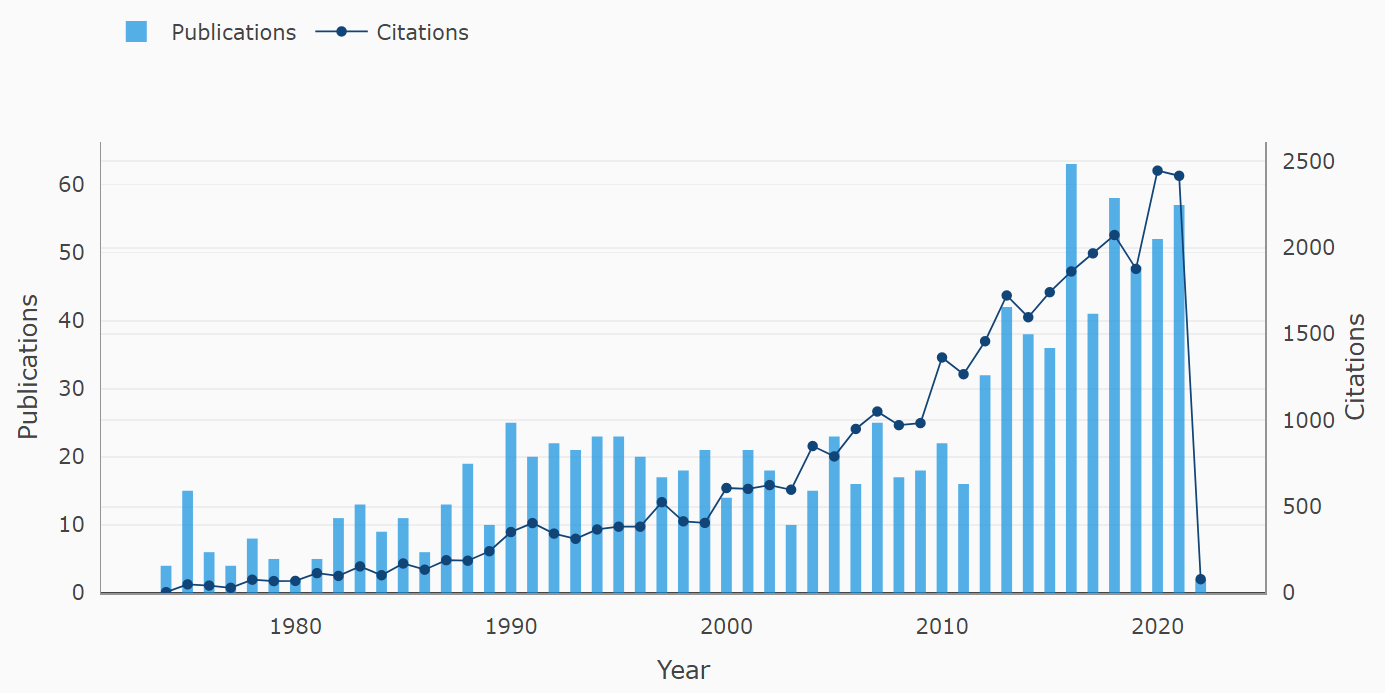

== Publication links ==
Dr. Kenneth B. Storey is among the top 2% of highly cited scientists in the world.

- PubMed
- Google Scholar
