= Flavelle Medal =

Royal Society of Canada award

The Flavelle Medal is an award of the Royal Society of Canada "for an outstanding contribution to biological science during the preceding ten years or for significant additions to a previous outstanding contribution to biological science". It is named in honour of Joseph Wesley Flavelle and is awarded bi-annually. The award consists of a gold plated silver medal.

== Recipients ==
Source: Royal Society of Canada

- 2024 - Lenore Fahrig, FRSC
- 2022 - Graham Bell, FRSC
- 2020 - Marla Sokolowski, FRSC
- 2018 - Frank Plummer, FRSC
- 2016 - Sylvain Moineau
- 2014 - Spencer Barrett, FRSC
- 2012 - Siegfried Hekimi, FRSC
- 2010 - Kenneth B. Storey, FRSC
- 2008 - John Smol, FRSC
- 2006 - Brett Finlay, FRSC
- 2004 - Brian D. Sykes, FRSC
- 2002 - Lewis E. Kay
- 2000 - David R. Jones, FRSC
- 1998 - Anthony Pawson, FRSC
- 1996 - Ian C. P. Smith, FRSC
- 1994 - Robert J. Cedergren, MSRC
- 1992 - Michael Smith, FRSC
- 1990 - Peter W. Hochachka, FRSC
- 1988 - Robert Haynes, FRSC
- 1986 - Neil Towers, FRSC
- 1984 - Robert G.E. Murray, FRSC
- 1982 - Clayton Oscar Person, FRSC
- 1980 - Gordon Dixon, FRSC
- 1978 - Louis Siminovitch, FRSC
- 1976 - Michael Shaw, FRSC
- 1974 - Juda Hirsh Quastel, FRSC
- 1972 - Douglas Harold Copp, FRSC
- 1970 - William Edwin Ricker, FRSC
- 1968 - Jacques Genest, MSRC
- 1966 - Erich Baer, FRSC
- 1965 - William Stewart Hoar, FRSC
- 1964 - Gleb Krotkov, FRSC
- 1963 - Robert James Rossiter, FRSC
- 1962 - Frederick Ernest Joseph Fry, FRSC
- 1961 - Charles Philippe Leblond, FRSC
- 1960 - Edmund Murton Walker, FRSC
- 1959 - Murray L. Barr, FRSC
- 1958 - Allan Grant Lochhead, FRSC
- 1957 - Thomas Wright M. Cameron, FRSC
- 1956 - George Lyman Duff, FRSC
- 1955 - Charles Samuel Hanes, FRSC
- 1954 - David Alymer Scott, FRSC
- 1953 - Everitt George Dunne Murray, FRSC
- 1952 - Archibald G. Huntsman, FRSC
- 1951 - Wilder Penfield, FRSC
- 1950 - Charles Best, FRSC
- 1949 - W. P. Thompson, FRSC
- 1948 - Margaret Newton, FRSC
- 1947 - Guilford Bevil Reed, FRSC
- 1946 - William Rowan, FRSC
- 1945 - Robert Boyd Thomson, FRSC
- 1944 - Velyien Ewart Henderson, FRSC
- 1943 - B. P. Babkin, FRSC
- 1942 - John Hubert Craigie, FRSC
- 1941 - Thomas Leonard Walker, FRSC
- 1940 - Robert William Boyle, FRSC
- 1939 - James Playfair McMurrich, FRSC
- 1938 - W. Lash Miller, FRSC
- 1937 - Frank D. Adams, FRSC
- 1936 - James Collip, FRSC
- 1935 - Frank Thomas Shutt, FRSC
- 1934 - Louis Vessot King, FRSC
- 1933 - Joseph Burr Tyrrell, FRSC
- 1932 - John Stanley Plaskett, FRSC
- 1931 - Sir Frederick Banting, FRSC
- 1930 - Archibald Byron Macallum, FRSC
- 1929 - Arthur Henry Reginald Buller, FRSC
- 1928 - Arthur Philemon Coleman, FRSC
- 1927 - Sir Arthur G. Doughty, FRSC
- 1926 - Sir John C. McLennan, FRSC
- 1925 - Sir Charles E. Saunders, FRSC

== See also ==
- List of biologists
- List of biology awards
- List of awards named after people
