= Neil Towers =

British/Canadian academic (1923-2004)

George Hugh Neil Towers FRSC
- Born: 28 September 1923; Bombay, India
- Died: 15 November 2004 (aged 81)
- Parents: Lieutenant-Colonel George William Towers DSO, OBE (father); Kathleen Mary Thompson (mother)
- Military career
- Allegiance: United Kingdom
- Branch: Royal Navy
- Rank: Lieutenant
- Conflicts: World War II

George Hugh Neil Towers FRSC (28 September 1923 – 15 November 2004) was a Canadian botanist. He was Emeritus Professor of Botany at the University of British Columbia. He was awarded the Flavelle Medal in 1986 and was cited extensively for his work in medicinal phytochemistry and ethnopharmacology of medicinal plants.

== Life ==
He was born in Bombay, India and was the eldest son of Lieutenant-Colonel George William Towers D.S.O., O.B.E. (Royal Engineers).

His scientific curiosity was aroused by the vast array of insect, plant and reptile life in the tropical climate of Burma where his mother Kathleen Mary Thompson had been born. His mother's family had lived continuously in Burma since the late 18th century.

During World War II he served with distinction in the Royal Navy aboard Corvettes reaching the rank of Lieutenant. After obtaining his PhD at Cornell University in 1954, he worked at McGill University and the National Research Council of Canada before being recruited to the University of British Columbia as Head of the Botany Department.
