= John Cunningham McLennan =

Canadian physicist (1867-1935)

Sir John Cunningham McLennan KBE FRS FRSC
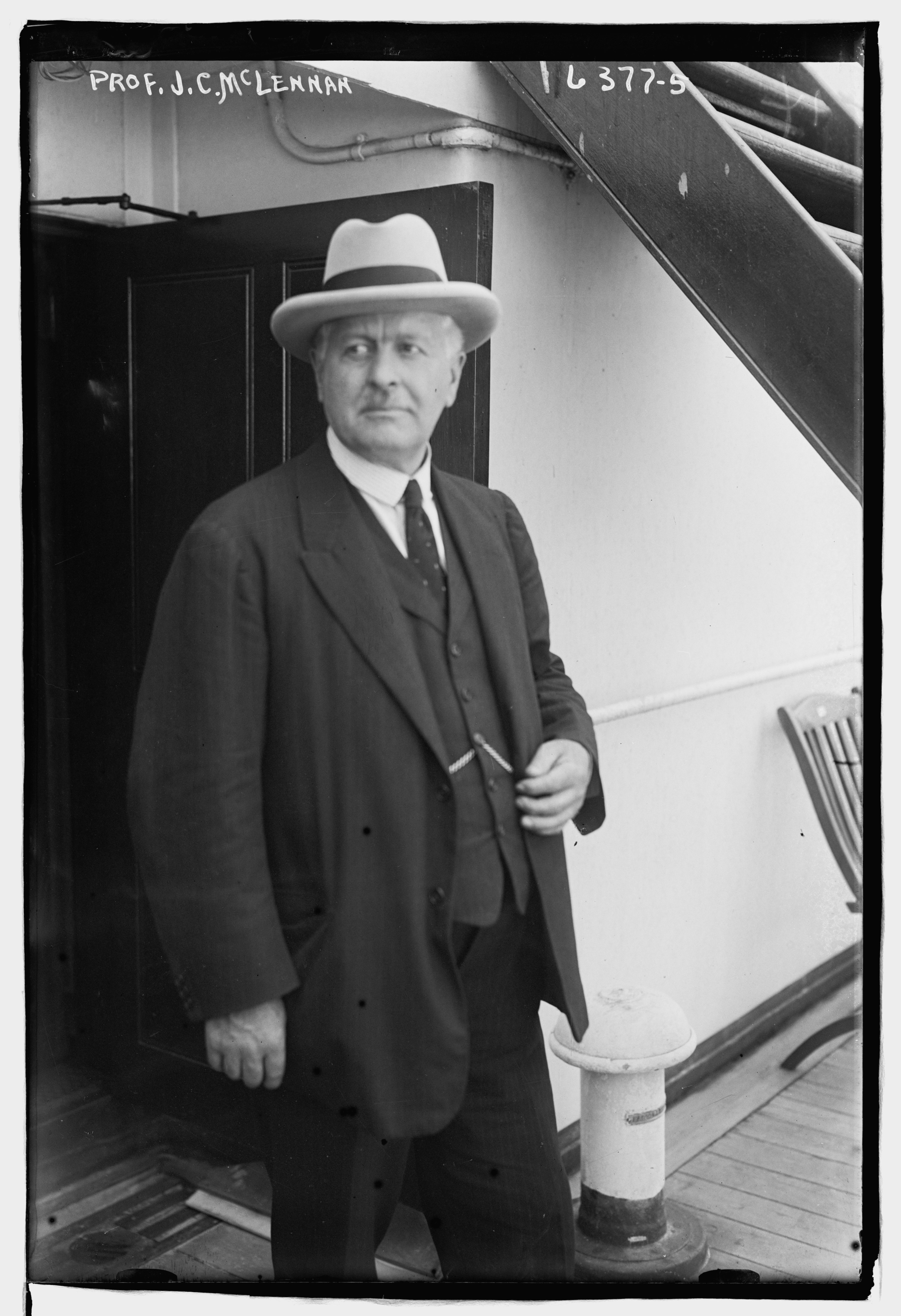
- London 1934

Dean of the University of Toronto School of Graduate Studies
- In office 1930–1932
- Preceded by: J. Playfair McMurrich
- Succeeded by: George Sidney Brett

Personal details
- Born: October 14, 1867 Ingersoll, Ontario, Canada
- Died: October 9, 1935 (aged 67) Paris, France
- Education: University of Toronto
- Scientific career
- Awards: Flavelle Medal (1926); Royal Medal (1927)
- Fields: Physics
- Doctoral students: John F. Allen

Sir John Cunningham McLennan, KBE FRS FRSC (October 14, 1867 – October 9, 1935) was a Canadian physicist.

Born in Ingersoll, Ontario, the son of David McLennan and Barbara Cunningham, he became the director of the physics laboratory at the University of Toronto from 1906. In 1930, he was appointed dean of the U of T's School of Graduate Studies, where he persistently advocated for all research to be under the mandate of the School. However the proposal was refused by the university's senate, and McLennan resigned from the deanship and the university in 1932.

McLennan was elected a Fellow of the Royal Society in 1915. McLennan delivered the Guthrie lecture to the Physical Society in 1918. With his graduate student, Gordon Merritt Shrum, he built a helium liquefier at the University of Toronto. In 1923, they became the second group of physicists in the world to successfully produce liquid helium, 15 years after Heike Kammerlingh Onnes. In 1926, McLennan was awarded the Royal Society of Canada's Flavelle Medal and in 1927 a Royal Medal.

He died in 1935 near Abbeville in France on a train from Paris to London of a heart attack. He is buried beside his wife in Stow of Wedale, Scotland.

Professional and academic associations
Preceded by Thomas Chapais	President of the Royal Society of Canada; 1924–1925	Succeeded by William Parks
