= Gleb Krotkov =

Russian-Canadian academic (1901–1968)

Gleb Paul Krotkov
- Born: May 9, 1901; Moscow, Russian Empire
- Died: January 29, 1968 (aged 66)
- Education: University of Toronto
- Occupation: plant physiologist
- Awards: Flavelle Medal (1964)

Gleb Paul Krotkov, FRSC (May 9, 1901 – January 29, 1968) was a Russian-Canadian academic and plant physiologist.

Born in Moscow, Russian Empire, he joined the White Russian Navy. After the defeat of the White forces in 1920 during the Russian Civil War, he managed to escape to Prague.

Later he emigrated to Canada and received his Ph.D. from the University of Toronto in 1934. He then joined the faculty of biology at Queen's University and taught there until his death.

From 1958 to 1963, Krotkov was the head of the department. He helped establish the first radio-isotope lab for biological research in Canada in 1948 and published over 75 research papers on plant physiology.

In 1950, he was made a Fellow of the Royal Society of Canada and was awarded the Flavelle Medal in 1964. In 1955, he was awarded a Guggenheim Fellowship.
