= Joseph Sirois =

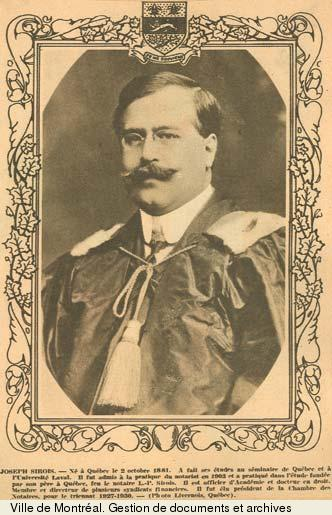

Joseph Sirois (2 October 1881 – 17 January 1941), baptised Louis-Philippe-Marie-Joseph Sirois, was a Canadian notary and professor. He was the second chairman of the eponymous Rowell–Sirois Commission.
