= F. E. J. Fry =

Canadian ecologist (1908–1989)

- Born: April 17, 1908; Woking, Surrey, England
- Died: May 22, 1989 (aged 81)
- Education: University of Toronto
- Awards: Flavelle Medal (1962); Canadian Centennial Medal (1968)
- Scientific career
- Workplaces: University of Toronto

Frederick Ernest Joseph Fry MBE FRSC (April 17, 1908 – May 22, 1989) was a Canadian ichthyologist and aquatic ecologist. He is known for his early research in physiological ecology and population dynamics in fishes. In the late 1940s, he became the first scientist to model how environmental factors affect the activity of fish. He was a 1959 Guggenheim Fellow, and served as president of several organizations including the American Society of Limnology and Oceanography (1951) American Fisheries Society (1966) and American Institute of Fishery Research Biologists (1972).

Fry was born in the English town of Woking, Surrey, April 17, 1908, to parents Ernest and Mabel Fry. His family immigrated to Canada in 1912, and after the first World War settled in Toronto. Fry attended the University of Toronto, earning a B.A. (1933), M.A. (1935), and PhD (1936). He joined the University of Toronto faculty as lecturer in 1938.

During World War II Fry served in the Royal Canadian Air Force from 1941 to 1945, working in aviation medicine, where he helped develop equipment aiding in respiration at high altitudes.

After the War, Fry returned to the University of Toronto as assistant professor in 1945, and became full professor of zoology in 1956, a position he held until his retirement in 1973.

One of his early studies of note was a long term field study of fishes of Lake Opeongo in Algonquin Provincial Park. In an influential 1949 paper, Fry developed "virtual population" analysis to understand effects of fishing on fish populations, a method which 50 years later was still in a chief way of determining total allowable catches in fisheries management.

His physiology papers "Effects of the Environment on Animal Physiology" in 1947, and "The Aquatic Respiration of Fish" in 1957 have become classic works in fisheries science.

== Family ==
In 1935 Fry married Irene Marguerite Stewart, and they had three children.

== Select works ==
- Fry, F. E. J (1947). Effects of the environment on animal activity. Toronto: University of Toronto Press.
- Fry, F. E. J (1957). "The Aquatic Respiration of Fish". In Brown, M. E. (ed.). The Physiology of Fishes I. New York: Academic Press. pp. 1–63.
- Ruttner, Franz. Fundamentals of Limnology. Translated by Frey, D. G. Frey; Fry, F. E. J. University of Toronto Press.
