= Archibald Macallum =

Canadian biochemist (1858–1934)

Archibald Macallum FRS FRSC
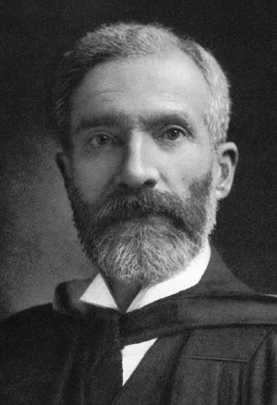
- Born: Archibald Byron Macallum; April 7, 1858; Belmont, Canada West
- Died: April 5, 1934 (aged 75); London, Ontario, Canada
- Education: University of Toronto (B.A.); Johns Hopkins University (Ph.D.)
- Awards: Flavelle Medal (1930)

Archibald Byron Macallum FRS FRSC (April 7, 1858 – April 5, 1934) was a Canadian biochemist and founder of the National Research Council of Canada. He was an influential figure in the development of Medical School of Toronto from a provincial school to a major institution. His scientific work centred on studies of ionic composition of cells and of blood.

== Education and academic career ==
Macallum was born in Belmont, Canada West, the son of a Scottish immigrant and one of twelve children. He grew up speaking Gaelic at home, learning English at school. He attended high school in London, Ontario and became a teacher after graduation. After saving money for several years he entered the University of Toronto. There he was influenced by biology professor Ramsay Wright; at 22 he earned a Bachelor of Arts (B.A.) degree and was awarded the medal in natural science. Over the next several years, he taught high school in Cornwall, Ontario and continued scientific work under Wright's direction. In 1883, he became a lecturer in biology at the University of Toronto and started work on a medical degree, studying both with Wright and with H. Newell Martin of Johns Hopkins University. In 1888 he earned a Ph.D. from Johns Hopkins, and two years later completed a medical degree from the University of Toronto; he then became the first chair of physiology at Toronto.

In his first years as physiology chair at the University of Toronto, Macallum and several other biologists trained by Wright (anatomy chair James McMurrich and pathology professor J. J. Mackenzie) fought to replace the Toronto medical school's traditional medical education with a curriculum based on biological science. They had largely succeeded in this by 1908, when Macallum became Chair of Biochemistry, a newly created position. In 1917, he left academia to organize the National Research Council. In 1920 he returned to chair the new Department of Biochemistry at McGill University, where he stayed until retirement in 1928.

Macallum was an elected International Honorary Member of the American Academy of Arts and Sciences and an International Member of the American Philosophical Society.

== Scientific work ==
Most of Macallum's scientific work involved measurements of small concentrations of salts and ions in biological fluids. In 1901, he showed that the chromatin in cell nuclei contains iron, and in his early years at the University of Toronto he adapted measurement methods for a number of ions (chloride, potassium and phosphate) for use with tissue and cell samples. Using these methods, he found that some chemicals are localized within cells, e.g., being present in the cytoplasm but not the nucleus. In 1906, he was recognized for this work by election to the Royal Society.

Building on his ion measurement work, Macallum's subsequent long-term research focused on the ionic content of blood and other biological fluids. He found that in many animals, ions of sodium, potassium, calcium and magnesium occur in close proportion to the ionic content of seawater, providing a strong argument for the marine origins of land vertebrates. Macallum argued that the vertebrate blood, with a total ion concentration of about one-third of seawater, indicates that vertebrates left the sea in the Silurian period or before, when the ion concentration of the sea was much lower. Macallum's series of experiments and arguments became a central part of the broader field of biochemical evolution in the first half of the 20th century, which attempted to apply biochemical work to problems in evolution and general biology.

Macallum trained many biochemists during his time at the University of Toronto, including the university's first PhD candidate, F. H. Scott; Maud Menten, Clara Benson, and James Collip.

== Notes ==
Professional and academic associations
Preceded by Alfred Baker	President of the Royal Society of Canada; 1916–1917	Succeeded by William Douw Lighthall
