= Anne Eggleston =

Canadian composer and educator

Anne Elizabeth Eggleston (September 6, 1934 – November 27, 1994) was a Canadian composer and educator.

The daughter of Wilfrid Eggleston, a journalism professor, and Magdelana Raškevičiutė, a writer, she was born in Ottawa, Ontario and studied music there, at The Royal Conservatory of Music and at the Eastman School of Music (MMus 1958). Her teachers included Gladys Barnes, Robert Fleming, Pierre Souvairan, Oskar Morawetz, John Weinzweig, Godfrey Ridout, Bernard Rogers and Orazio Frugoni. Eggleston began giving private lessons in piano and composition in Ottawa in 1958. After winning two scholarships in 1965, she studied teaching for voice and piano at the Banff School of Fine Arts.

In 1964, her String Quartet won the CBC Radio Ottawa Original Music Competition. Eggleston also composed musical exercises for use in teaching the piano. Some of her pieces for piano students were incorporated into the Royal Conservatory of Music syllabus and examinations.

She died in Ottawa at the age of 60.

Eggleton's papers and piano are held at Library and Archives Canada.

== Selected works ==
- Piano Quartet chamber quartet (1955)
- Autumnal Clouds orchestra (1958)
- The Woodcarver's Wife opera (1961)
- Five Lullabies of Eugene Field voice and piano (1961)
- Sketches of Ottawa piano (1962)
- On Citadel Hill string orchestra (1964)
- Musical Christmas Cards piano or voice and piano (1980)
