= Guilford Bevil Reed =

President of the Royal Society of Canada
- In office 1952–1953
- Preceded by: Henry Angus
- Succeeded by: Jean Bruchési

Personal details
- Born: November 27, 1887 Port George, Nova Scotia
- Died: February 21, 1955 (aged 67)

Guilford Bevil Reed OBE FRSC (November 27, 1887 – February 21, 1955) was a Canadian medical researcher whose research involved diseases such as tuberculosis, gas gangrene, tetanus and rinderpest.

Born in Port George, Nova Scotia, he received a B.Sc. in 1912, M.A. in 1913 and Ph.D. in 1915 from Harvard University. From 1915 to 1954, he taught at Queen's University.

In 1932, he was elected a Fellow of the Royal Society of Canada and was its president from 1952 to 1953. In 1947, he was awarded the Royal Society of Canada's Flavelle Medal.

In 1942, he was made an Officer of the Order of the British Empire.

Professional and academic associations
Preceded by Henry Angus	President of the Royal Society of Canada; 1952–1953	Succeeded by Jean Bruchési
