= John Wesley Dafoe =

Canadian journalist (1866–1944)

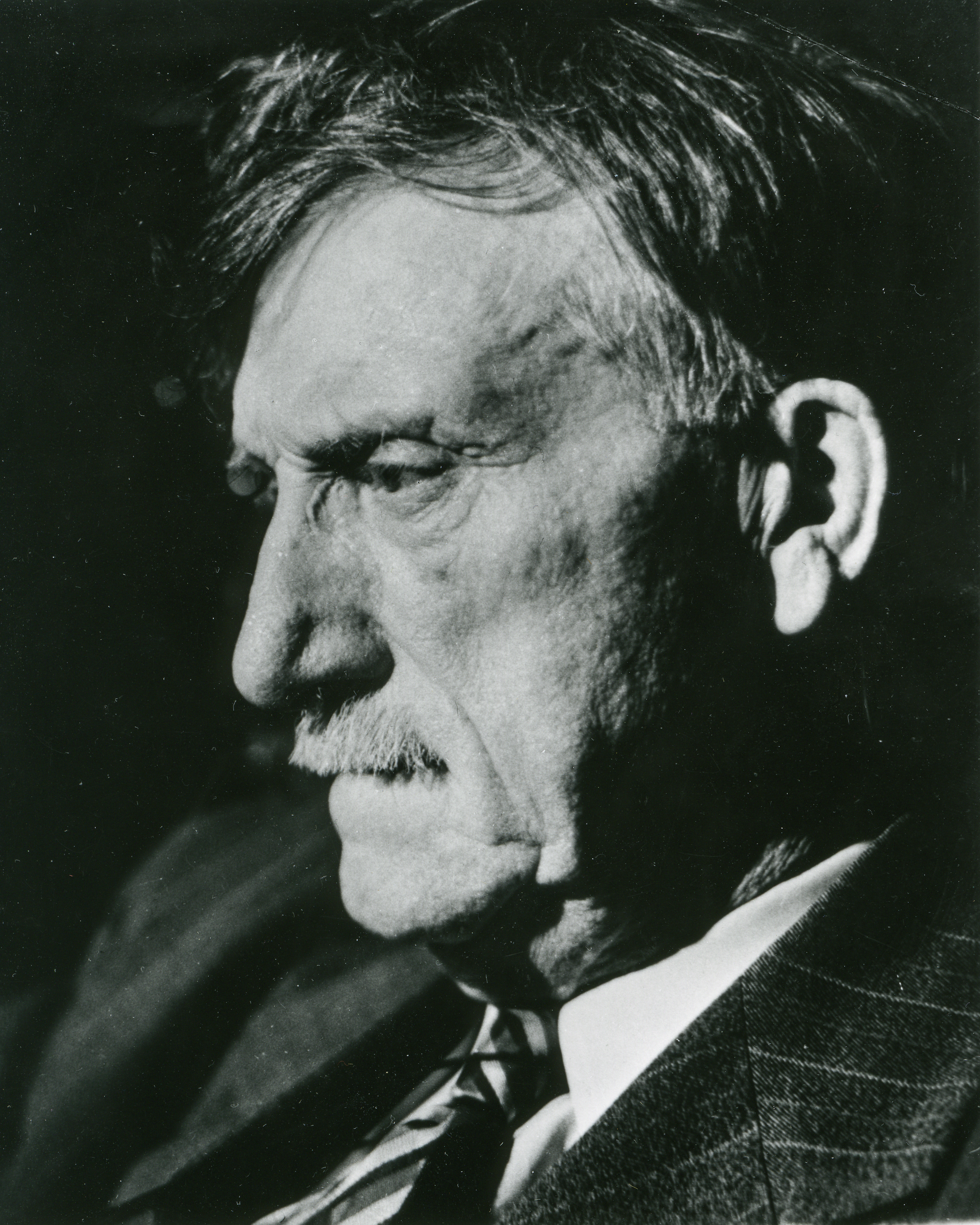
- Born: March 8, 1866; Combermere, Canada West
- Died: January 10, 1944 (aged 77); Winnipeg, Manitoba, Canada
- Occupations: Journalist; school teacher
- Years active: 1883–1944
- Title: Editor of the Manitoba Free Press (1901–1944)
- Spouse: Alice Parmalee (m. 1890)

John Wesley Dafoe (8 March 1866 – 9 January 1944) was a Canadian journalist. From 1901 to 1944 he was the editor of the Manitoba Free Press, later named the Winnipeg Free Press. He also wrote several books, including a biography of Sir Wilfrid Laurier.

Dafoe was one of the country's most influential and powerful Liberal journalists. During his tenure, the Free Press was among the most important newspapers in Canada and was respected one of the great newspapers of the world. His influence extended to the very centre of Canadian power, both through his writing and his close relations with his employers, the Liberal Sifton family.

In 1919, he did not give unqualified support to the Business side during the strong Labour-Capital confrontation that was the Winnipeg general strike. He claimed credit for his paper that Winnipeg adopted Single Transferable Voting for city elections in 1920.

Dafoe accompanied Prime Minister William Lyon Mackenzie King to several imperial conferences and was asked by the Prime Minister to sit on the Rowell–Sirois Commission studying federal–provincial relations. In the late 1930s Dafoe opposed appeasement of fascist dictators and urged the government to prepare for a major war, which he accurately predicted would begin in 1939.

He advocated free trade policies. He refused prestigious appointments, including a consular position in Washington, a knighthood, and a seat in the Senate of Canada. He also declined to stand for Parliament.

Dafoe died in 1944 and is buried in Elmwood Cemetery.

His son, Edwin Dafoe, became managing editor of the Free Press and his grandson, John Dafoe, became the editor of The Montreal Star and later editorial page editor of the Winnipeg Free Press. His grandson Christopher Dafoe was editor of The Beaver. His daughter, Julie Annette Elizabeth Dafoe, was Head Librarian of the University of Manitoba from 1937 to 1960 (its main library now bears her name).

== Works ==
- Over the Canadian Battlefields (1919)
- Laurier: A Study in Canadian Politics (1922)
- Canada: An American Nation (1935)

Academic offices
Preceded by Samuel Matheson	Chancellor of the University of Manitoba; 1934–1944	Succeeded by Andrew Knox Dysart
Professional and academic associations
Preceded by Harold Innis	President of the Canadian Political Science Association; 1938–1939	Succeeded by J. C. Hemmeon
