= Thomas Reeve Rosebrugh =

Thomas Reeve Rosebrugh MA FRSC (1866–1943) was a Canadian electrical engineer, inventor, and professor of electrical engineering.

T. R. Rosebrugh's father was the surgeon and inventor Abner M. Rosebrugh. Together they patented two inventions related to the transmission of telephonic and telegraphic messages.

T. S. Rosebrugh was a student enrolled in the program of physics and mathematics at the University of Toronto, where he assisted James Loudon. Rosebrugh worked in the electrical engineering industry for a number of years and then returned to the University of Toronto in 1899, where he became a professor given the task of starting and organizing the University of Toronto's department of electrical engineering. Rosebrugh was the head of the University of Toronto's department of electrical engineering from 1900 to 1936.

T. R. Rosebrugh was an Invited Speaker of the ICM in 1924 in Toronto. The Rosebrugh Building on the University of Toronto's St. George campus is named in honor of both Thomas R. Rosebrugh and Abner M. Rosebrugh.

== Selected publications ==
- "Discussion on "Output and Regulation in Long-Distance Lines," and "Calculation of the High-Tension Line." Frontenac, NY, June 29, 1909." Transactions of the American Institute of Electrical Engineers 28, no. 1 (1909): 687–723. doi:10.1109/T-AIEE.1909.4768193
- with W. Lash Miller: "Mathematical theory of the changes of concentration at the electrode brought about by diffusion and by chemical reaction." The Journal of Physical Chemistry 14, no. 9 (1910): 816–884. doi:10.1021/j150117a002
- "Focus of Auroral Streamers, September 23, 1924." Journal of the Royal Astronomical Society of Canada 18 (1924): 427. Bibcode:1924JRASC..18..427R
- "A general theorem on quantic determinants." Bull. Amer. Math. Soc. 33 (1927): 583–590. doi:10.1090/S0002-9904-1927-04413-5
- "Abstract of the analytics of transmission calculations." Journal of the AIEE 49, no. 11 (1930): 917–917. doi:10.1109/JAIEE.1930.6537006
