= James Collip =

Biochemist; part of group that isolated insulin

James Bertram Collip CBE FRS FRSC FRCP FRCPC
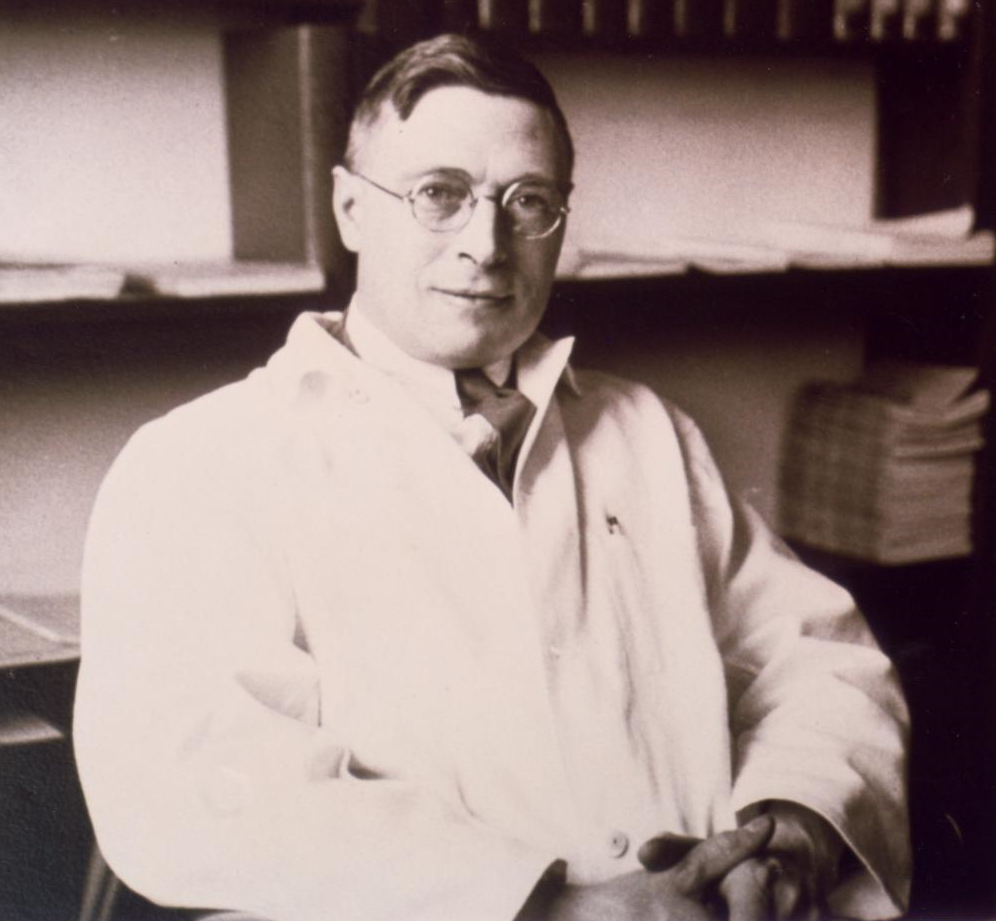
- Collip in his office at McGill University, c. 1930
- Born: James Bertram Collip; November 20, 1892; Belleville, Ontario, Canada
- Died: June 19, 1965 (aged 72); London, Ontario, Canada
- Education: University of Toronto
- Known for: Purification of insulin
- Awards: Flavelle Medal (1936); Cameron Prize for Therapeutics of the University of Edinburgh (1937); Fellow of the Royal Society
- Scientific career
- Fields: Biochemistry

James Bertram Collip (November 20, 1892 – June 19, 1965) was a Canadian biochemist who was part of the Toronto group which isolated insulin. He served as the chair of the department of biochemistry at McGill University from 1928 to 1941 and dean of medicine at the University of Western Ontario from 1947 to 1961, where he was a charter member of The Kappa Alpha Society.

== Education ==
Collip as a graduate student, ca. 1914. The Discovery and Early Development of Insulin Digital Collection, Toronto

Born in Belleville, Ontario, he enrolled at Trinity College at the University of Toronto at the age of 15, and studied physiology and biochemistry. He obtained a Ph.D. in biochemistry from the same university in 1916.

== Career ==
In 1915, at the age of 22, Collip accepted a lecturing position in Edmonton in the department of physiology at the University of Alberta Faculty of Medicine, shortly before completing his doctorate. He fulfilled the role for 7 years, eventually rising to the position of professor and head of the department of biochemistry in 1922. His research at the time was mainly focused on blood chemistry of vertebrates and invertebrates.

He took a sabbatical leave beginning in April 1921, and travelled to Toronto on a Rockefeller Travelling Scholarship for a six-month position with Professor John MacLeod of the University of Toronto's department of physiology. There his research program (on the effect of pH on the concentration of sugar in the blood) would take him to the Marine Biological Laboratory in Woods Hole, Massachusetts, and St. Andrews Biological Station in Saint Andrews, New Brunswick, before he returned to Toronto late in the year.

== Success of insulin ==
MacLeod was overseeing the work of Frederick Banting and Charles Best in their search for a treatment for diabetes which they had begun in May 1921. In December, when Banting and Best were having difficulties in refining the pancreatic extract, MacLeod freed Collip from his other research to enable him to join the research team. Collip's task was to prepare insulin in a more pure, usable form than Banting and Best had been able to achieve to date. In January 1922, after 14-year-old Leonard Thompson suffered a severe allergic reaction to an injection of insulin, Collip achieved the goal of preparing a pancreatic extract pure enough for Thompson to recover and to use in clinical trials. Despite Collip's breakthrough, Banting was furious as he saw that "Collip's discoveries were not a cause for celebration but a new threat". At some point between January 17 and 24, Collip and Banting reportedly had a physical altercation in the labs, supposedly when "Collip visited Banting and Best in their lab and told them that he wasn’t going to share the latest extract formulation (which may or may not have had Macleod's blessing) and that he was contemplating leaving the research team and patenting the process on his own". A colleague later lampooned this incident with a "cartoon showing Banting sitting on Collip and titled 'The Discovery of Insulin.'" Nonetheless, successful trials were soon completed and the future of insulin was assured. Banting, Best and Collip subsequently shared the patent for insulin, which they sold to the University of Toronto for one dollar.

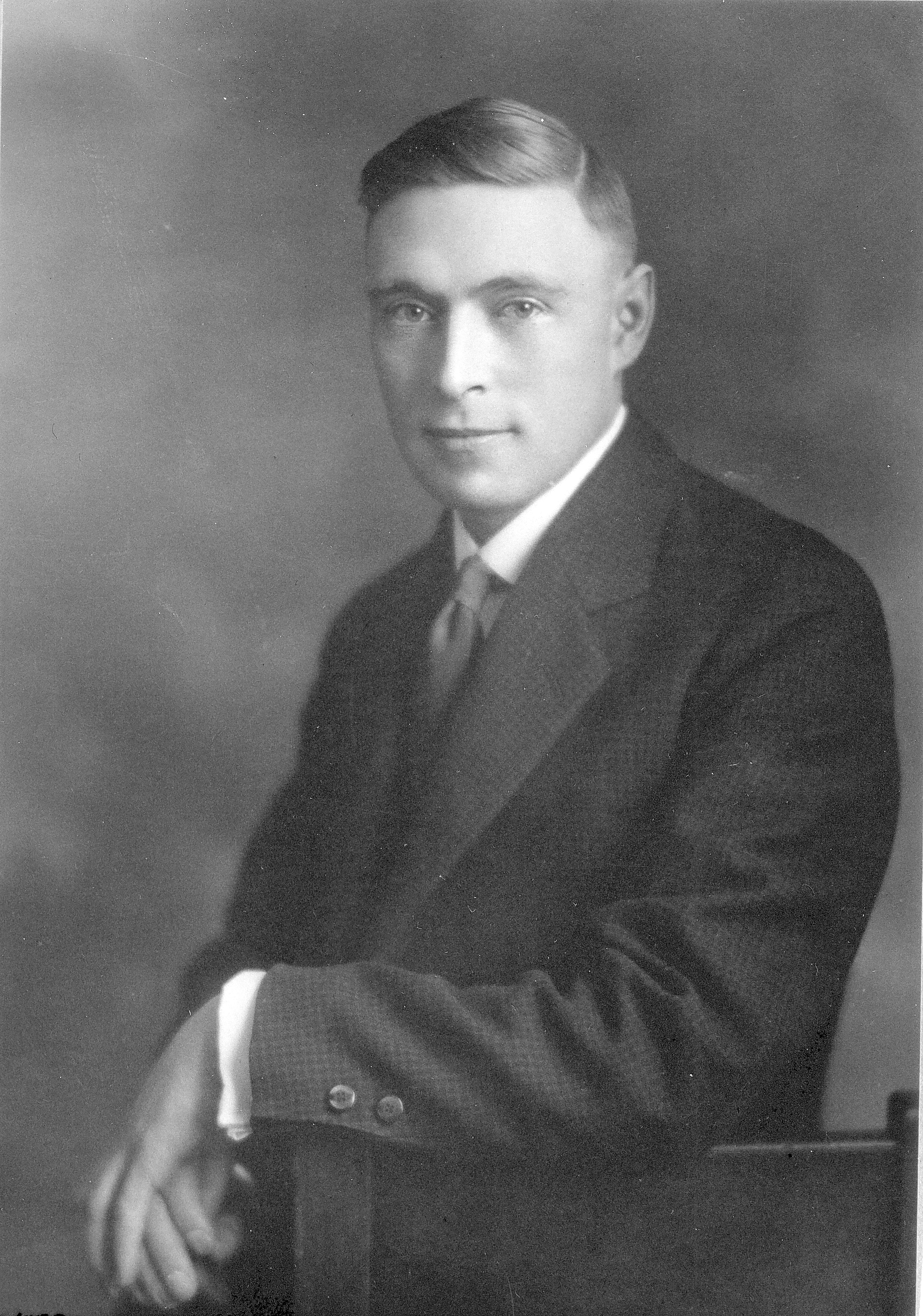
Collip in 1929.

Due to disagreements between Banting and MacLeod, there was ill will generated within the team. The Nobel Prize for Medicine was awarded to Banting and MacLeod in 1923. Feeling that Best had been overlooked in the award, Banting shared his portion with Best. In response, MacLeod shared his portion with Collip. Nonetheless, Collip is often overlooked as a co-discoverer of insulin, in part due to Best's public relations campaign that downplayed Collip's crucial role.

Following this early success, Collip returned to Edmonton to take up a position as Head of the new Department of Biochemistry, and to pursue his own studies on hormone research. In 1928 he was recruited to McGill University in Montreal by his former graduate advisor, Archibald Macallum. Collip served as Chair of McGill's Department of Biochemistry from 1928 to 1941. From 1947 to 1961, Collip was appointed Dean of Medicine at the University of Western Ontario. He is regarded as a pioneer of endocrine research. He did pioneering work with the parathyroid hormone (PTH).

He died on June 19, 1965, at the age of 72.

== Honours and awards ==
- Fellow of the Royal Society of Canada, 1925
- Fellow of the Royal Society, 1933
- Honorary Doctorate D.Sc, Harvard University, 1936
- Cameron Prize for Therapeutics of the University of Edinburgh, 1937
- Commander of the Order of the British Empire, 1943
- Honorary Doctorate D.Sc., University of Oxford, 1946
- Honorary Doctorate, University of Alberta, 1946
- Medal of Freedom with Silver Palm (US), 1947
- Banting Medal of the American Diabetes Association, 1960
- Honorary Doctorate D.Sc. from the University of Western Ontario, 30 May 1964

== Footnotes ==
Professional and academic associations
Preceded by Frederic William Howay	President of the Royal Society of Canada; 1942–1943	Succeeded by Olivier Maurault
