= Peter Hochachka =

Canadian zoologist (1937–2002

Peter William Hochachka
- Born: March 9, 1937; Bordenave, Alberta
- Died: September 16, 2002 (aged 65); Vancouver
- Education: University of Alberta, Dalhousie University, Duke University (PhD 1964)
- Occupation(s): Zoologist, biochemist
- Employer: University of British Columbia
- Known for: Adaptational biochemistry
- Awards: Flavelle Medal, Killam Memorial Prize, NSERC Gold Medal

Peter William Hochachka, OC FRSC (March 9, 1937 – September 16, 2002) was a Canadian professor and zoologist at the University of British Columbia (UBC). He is known for his foundational work in creating the new field of adaptational biochemistry, connecting metabolic biochemistry with comparative physiology.

Hochachka did extensive field and laboratory work studying the biochemical basis for mechanisms of adaptation in multiple species and environments, including water (trout, tuna fish, squid, oysters), air (locusts, hummingbirds) and land (turtles, seals, and humans). His book Biochemical Adaptation: Mechanism and Process in Physiological Evolution (1973) became "the bible for many comparative physiologists grasping for mechanisms to explain the diversity of adaptations". Subsequent volumes in 1985 and 2002 continued to push the boundaries of the field.

== Early life and education ==
Peter William Hochachka was born in Bordenave, Alberta, the son of the very Rev. William and Pearl Hochachka. He obtained his B.Sc. from the University of Alberta in 1959. He received his M.Sc. from Dalhousie University and a Ph.D. from Duke University in 1964.

== Career ==
Hochachka joined the University of British Columbia in 1966, remaining there until his retirement in 2002. He taught at in the Department of Zoology. Along with George N. Somero, he pioneered the study of biochemical adaptation to the environment, and is considered to have "created the discipline of adaptational biochemistry".

Hochachka was considered a world leader in the field of defense mechanisms against low oxygen levels. His work included studies of enzyme adaptation to temperature and pressure, the mechanisms underlying tolerance to hypoxia in animals, the bioenergetics of exercise, metabolism during diving in seals, allometric scaling, and human adaptations to high-altitude hypoxia.

Hochachka did extensive work in both the field and the laboratory. He was involved in research expeditions to the Amazon Basin, the Galapagos Islands, the Arctic. the Antarctic, the high Andes and the Himalayas. These included at least nine expeditions, some of which Hochachka organized, on the National Science Foundation's vessel RV Alpha Helix.

Hochachka authored articles for nearly 400 publications and wrote or co-wrote seven books. He is the co-author, with George Somero, of Biochemical Adaptation: Mechanism and Process in Physiological Evolution, first published in 1973 and described ten years later as an "overwhelming success". They published an updated and expanded edition in 1984 and a third volume in 2002, which was praised for its outstanding scope, "the sheer variety of material covered and the obvious excitement the authors bring to these topics".

Peter W. Hochachka died of prostate cancer and lymphoma on September 16, 2002. One of his last publications was a "groundbreaking paper" co-authored with his surgeons on the connections between hypoxia and prostate cancer.

Peter Hochachka was married to Brenda Hochachka (née Clayton). They had three children: Claire, Gail and Gareth.

== Honours ==
Highly honoured, Hochachka was made a Fellow of the Royal Society of Canada in 1983. He was awarded the Royal Society of Canada's Flavelle Medal in 1990.

Hochachka was awarded the Canada Council Killam Memorial Prize in Science in 1993 and the NSERC Gold Medal for Science and Engineering in 1995 (now the Gerhard Herzberg Canada Gold Medal for Science and Engineering). In 1999, he was made an Officer of the Order of Canada.

== See also ==
- Comparative physiology
- Evolutionary physiology
