= William Lash Miller =

Canadian chemist (1866–1940)

William Lash Miller CBE FRSC
- Miller in 1924
- Born: September 10, 1866; Galt, Canada West
- Died: September 1, 1940 (aged 73)
- Education: University of Toronto; Ludwig-Maximilians-Universität München
- Scientific career
- Fields: Chemistry
- Workplaces: University of Toronto
- Doctoral students: Clara Benson

William Lash Miller, CBE, FRSC (1866 – 1940) was a Canadian chemist, chemistry professor, and pioneer of physical chemistry.

Lash Miller was born on 10 September 1866 at Galt, Canada West.

Lash Miller studied chemistry at the University of Toronto with bachelor's degree in 1887. He then studied from 1887 to 1889 under August Wilhelm von Hofmann, in 1889 under Viktor Meyer at the University of Göttingen, and in 1890 at the Ludwig-Maximilians-Universität München, where he received his doctorate in organic chemistry under Adolf von Baeyer. Subsequently, he studied with Wilhelm Ostwald at Leipzig University, which was a turning point in his chemistry career. From then on, he often spent summers in Ostwald's laboratory at Leipzig University. In 1891, Lash Miller became a demonstrator at the University of Toronto and was again in 1892 with Wilhelm Ostwald at Leipzig University, where he earned a second doctorate (in physical chemistry). At the University of Toronto, Lash Miller became in 1894 a lecturer, in 1900 an associate professor, and in 1908 a professor of physical chemistry at the University of Toronto. In 1937, he retired as a professor emeritus.

His greatest scientific strength lay in his mastery of the chemical thermodynamics of Willard Gibbs, learned from Ostwald at Leipzig. His greatest weakness (also learned from Ostwald) was his refusal to use or teach the atomic and molecular theories that formed the mainstream of 20th-century chemical thinking. Toronto became an important centre of chemical research, and a roster of Miller's pupils includes a remarkable number of important chemists.

Lash Miller was considered one of the most important Canadian chemists at the time of his death. He built up the teaching of physical chemistry in Canada and was also one of Canada's first representatives of physical chemistry (and clinical biochemistry), with which he dealt from about 1915. With Ostwald, he devoted much of his scientific efforts to implement Gibbs' very theoretical concepts on a laboratory scale. Lash Miller did research on many areas of physical chemistry; in particular, he extended Gibbs' treatment of multicomponent systems.

Miller served as the doctoral advisor of biochemist Clara Benson, one of the first women to earn a PhD from the university.

Miller was elected to the Royal Society of Canada in 1899 and served as its President for 1934–1935. He was one of the main organizers of the Canadian Institute of Chemistry and was in 1926 its president. In 1926, he became the first Canadian honorary member of the American Chemical Society. He was a member of the editorial staff of the Journal of the American Chemical Society and of The Journal of Physical Chemistry A. He was made Commander of the Order of the British Empire in 1935. The Lash Miller Chemical Laboratories building on the University of Toronto's St. George campus is named in his honor.

Chemist William Lash Miller is not to be confused with lawyer William Miller Lash, his double cousin (first cousin on both sides).

He died on 1 September 1940 in Toronto.

== Selected publications ==
- On the Conversion of Chemical Energy into Electrical, Journal of Physical Chemistry, 10 (1892), 459–466
- with F. J. Smale: Introduction to qualitative analysis, 1896
- On the Second Differential Coefficients of Gibbs Function ζ. The Vapor Tensions, Freezing and Boiling Points of Ternary Mixtures, Journal of Physical Chemistry, 1 (1896–1897), 633–642
- Chemical and Physical Reactions, 1902
- On the Mechanism of Induced Reactions, 1907
- The Theory of the Direct Method of Determining Transport Numbers, Journal of Physical Chemistry, 69 (1910), 436–441
- with T.R. Rosebrugh: Mathematical Theory of Changes in Concentration at the Electrode. Brought About by Diffusion and by Chemical Reactions, Journal of Physical Chemistry, 14 (1910), 816–885
- The Influence of Diffusion on Electromotive Force Produced in Solutions by Centrifugal Action, Transactions of the Electrochemical Society, 21 (1912). 209–217
- Toxicity and Chemical Potential, Journal of Physical Chemistry, 24 (1920), 562–569
- The Method of Willard Gibbs in Chemical Thermodynamics, Chemical Reviews, 1 (1924-1925), 293–344
- with A.R. Gordon: Numerical Evaluation of Infinite Series and Integrals Which Arise in Certain Problems of Linear Heat Flow, Electrochemical Diffusion, etc., Journal of Physical Chemistry, 35 (1931), 2785–2884
