= Rowell–Sirois Commission =

1937–40 Canadian inquiry

Royal Commission on Dominion–Provincial Relations
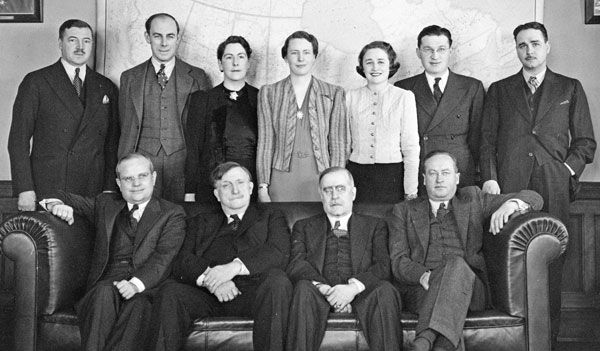
- The members of the Rowell–Sirois Commission in 1938, after Newton Rowell resigned as co-chair because he had suffered a stroke. Seated, from left to right: H. F. Angus, J. W. Dafoe, Joseph Sirois (chairman) and R. A. MacKay. Standing behind them are commission staff members.
- Also known as: Rowell–Sirois Commission
- Commissioners: Newton Rowell (Chair); Joseph Sirois (Chair); Thibaudeau Rinfret; John Wesley Dafoe; Robert Alexander MacKay; Henry Angus
- Inquiry period: August 14, 1937 – May 3, 1940
- Authorized: Order in Council P.C. 1908; Order in Council P.C. 2880; Order in Council P.C. 2946

The Rowell–Sirois Commission, officially known as the Royal Commission on Dominion–Provincial Relations, was a Canadian Royal Commission that looked into the Canadian economy and federal–provincial relations. It was called in 1937 and reported in 1940.

The Commission was chaired first by Newton Rowell and then by Joseph Sirois. James McGregor Stewart acted as chief counsel. It was called as a result of the Great Depression. The attempts to manage the Depression by the government illustrated grave flaws with the Canadian constitution. While the federal government had most of the revenue gathering powers, the provinces had unexpectedly greater expenditure responsibilities. The founders had given the provinces responsibility for health care, education, and welfare when they were only minor concerns, but by 1937, however, they had all become massive expenditure areas.

The Commission recommended for the federal government to take over control of unemployment insurance and pensions. It also recommended the creation of equalization payments and large transfers of money from the federal government to the provinces each year. Other recommendations were not adopted because of resistance from the provinces or the federal government.

The crown copyright on the document expired after 50 years, in 1990, and the text is in the public domain.

== Sources ==
- Bélanger, Claude (26 February 2001). "The Rowell-Sirois Report and Canadian Federalism during the Great Depression (1929-1939)". Studies on the Canadian Constitution and Canadian Federalism. Marianopolis College.
- Burns, Ronald M. (1961). "The Royal Commission on Dominion-Provincial Relations: The Report in Retrospect". Canadian Issues. pp. 143–157. doi:10.3138/9781442652828-012. ISBN 9781442652828.
- Wardhaugh, Robert Alexander (2021). The Rowell-Sirois Commission and the remaking of Canadian federalism. Vancouver, BC: UBC Press. ISBN 978-0-7748-6501-2.
