= Emma Sophia Baker =

Canadian psychologist (1865–1943)

- Born: February 27, 1856; Milton, Canada West
- Died: October 26, 1943 (aged 87); Toronto, Ontario

Academic background
- Education: University of Toronto

Academic work
- Discipline: Psychology
- Institutions: Mount Allison University; Maryland College for Women

Emma Sophia Baker (February 27, 1856 – October 26, 1943) was a Canadian psychologist. In 1903, she became the first person to earn a Ph.D. in philosophy from the University of Toronto (at the time, psychology was considered a subdiscipline of philosophy). Baker was also one of the first two women to earn a Ph.D. from that institution, the other was chemist Clara Benson.

== Biography ==
Baker was born in Milton, Canada West in 1856. She attended Newmarket High School in Newmarket, Toronto Normal School, and Albert College in Belleville. She taught and served as a principal at a number of all girls' schools, including Dickenson's Seminary (now Lycoming College) in Pennsylvania, and Presbyterian Ladies' College in Toronto.

While earning her Ph.D. in philosophy, Baker worked under the supervision of August Kirschmann, a German-born psychologist who led the psychology laboratory at the University of Toronto. In the laboratory, Baker conducted experiments on the aesthetics of colours. She published two of her experiments in the laboratory's in-house publication called the University of Toronto Studies Psychological Series. These two studies also served as her doctoral dissertation. The first study was “Experiments on the aesthetic of light and colour: On combinations of two colours", and the second was “Experiments on the aesthetic of light and colour: Spectrally pure colours in binary combinations".

From 1901 until 1914, Baker worked at Mount Allison University in Sackville, New Brunswick where she started as the lady principal of the Ladies' College, and then moved up to serve as vice-principal of the institution. From 1914 until her retirement in 1928, she held a professorship in Psychology, Ethics and Economics at the Maryland College for Women in Lutherville, Maryland. Many educated women in the early 1900's either helped popularize science or they gave it up after they got married. Baker took it upon herself to educate and empower young women after she conducted her research on light and colors. Baker was one of the first female Canadian psychologists, and instead of becoming a housewife or playing second fiddle to a male colleague like many other educated women, she decided to make a difference and teach the next generation of young female Canadian scholars.

At the end of her career, Baker returned to Toronto where she eventually died on October 26, 1943, at age 87. She was buried in London, Ontario.
