= J. Playfair McMurrich =

Canadian zoologist

James Playfair McMurrich
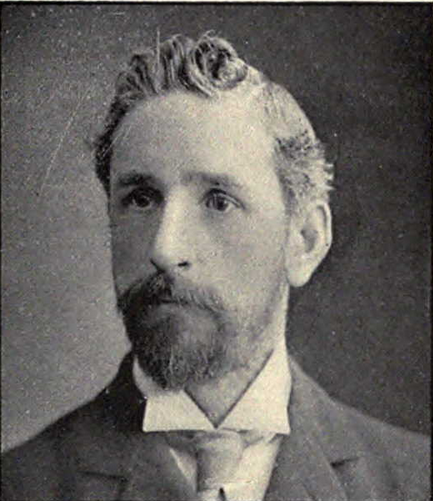
- McMurrich from the 1902 Michiganensian

1st Dean of the University of Toronto School of Graduate Studies
- In office 1922–1930
- Preceded by: Position established
- Succeeded by: John Cunningham McLennan

Personal details
- Born: October 16, 1859 Toronto, Canada West
- Died: February 9, 1939 (aged 79)
- Occupation: zoologist and academic

James Playfair McMurrich, FRSC (October 16, 1859 – February 9, 1939) was a Canadian zoologist and academic.

Born in Toronto, the son of John McMurrich, McMurrich received a M.A. from the University of Toronto in 1881 and a Ph.D. from Johns Hopkins University in 1885.

From 1881 to 1884, he was a professor of biology and horticulture at Ontario Agricultural College in the University of Guelph. From 1892 to 1894, he taught at the University of Cincinnati. He was a professor of anatomy in homoeopathic department of the University of Michigan. He was elected to the American Philosophical Society in 1907. From 1907 to 1930, he was professor of anatomy at the University of Toronto.

From 1908 to 1909 he served as the eighth president of the Association of American Anatomists.

From 1922 to 1923, he was the president of the Royal Society of Canada. In 1922, he was the president of the American Association for the Advancement of Science. From 1922 to 1930, he was the first dean of the University of Toronto's School of Graduate Studies, of which he had been the chair since 1919. In 1933, he was the president of the History of Science Society. In 1939, he was awarded the Royal Society of Canada's Flavelle Medal.

In 1882, he married Katie Moodie Vickers.

== Selected bibliography ==
- A text-book of invertebrate morphology (1894)
- Leonardo da Vinci: The Anatomist (1930)

Professional and academic associations
Preceded by Duncan C. Scott	President of the Royal Society of Canada; 1922–1923	Succeeded by Thomas Chapais
Preceded by Berthold Laufer	President of the History of Science Society; 1933	Succeeded by Harvey Williams Cushing
