= Clara Benson =

Canadian chemist

Clara Cynthia Benson
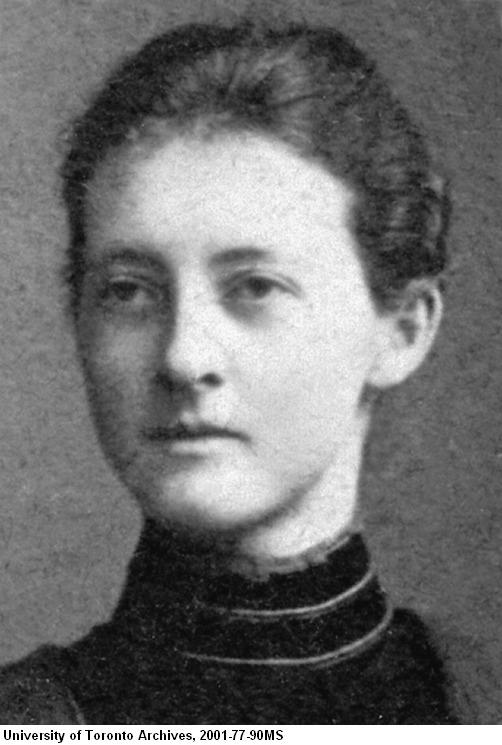
- Born: June 5, 1875; Port Hope, Ontario, Canada
- Died: March 24, 1964 (aged 88); Port Hope, Ontario, Canada
- Education: University of Toronto (BA in chemistry, 1899; PhD in chemistry, 1903)
- Scientific career
- Fields: physical chemistry, biochemistry
- Workplaces: University of Toronto
- Thesis: The rates of the reactions in solutions containing ferrous sulphate, potassium iodide, and chromic acid
- Doctoral advisor: William Lash Miller
- Other academic advisors: Archibald Byron Macallum

Clara Cynthia Benson (1875–1964) was a Canadian chemist, the sole female founder of the American Society for Biological Chemistry (now the American Society for Biochemistry and Molecular Biology (ASBMB)) and one of the first two women to earn a Ph.D. from the University of Toronto (U of T) (the other being philosophy student Emma Baker). She later became one of U of T's first two female associate professors. Trained in physical chemistry, she switched focus to biochemistry when lack of job opportunities for female chemists led her to take a position teaching food chemistry as part of U of T's Domestic Science program. She also played a large role in the development of U of T's women's athletics program.

== Early life ==
Clara Cynthia Benson was born on June 5, 1875, in Port Hope, Ontario, Canada, to Laura Abigail Fuller and Thomas Moore Benson, a lawyer, judge, and businessman. She was raised in a large blended household that included two older half-sisters from her father's first marriage, as well as younger siblings from her parents' union.

Her family's social position placed Benson within a well-established environment. Through her father's first marriage, the household was connected to John McCaul, a former president of University College.

Benson grew up in Port Hope and attended school locally, including Port Hope High School. Her early education took place at a time when opportunities for girls were expanding but remained limited, particularly in higher education.

=== Education ===
Benson entered University College at the University of Toronto (U of T) in 1895, at age 20, where she studied chemistry, mathematics, and physics. She enrolled only one year after the university began admitting women, at a time when female students were excluded from certain facilities, including reading rooms and library catalogues.

She graduated with a Bachelor of Arts in chemistry in 1899, at age 24, becoming the first woman to earn a Bachelor of Arts in chemistry at the University of Toronto, and proceeded directly to doctoral studies. In 1903, at age 28, she earned her PhD, one of the first two women to receive a doctorate from the university; the other was philosophy student Emma Baker.

Her doctoral research, supervised by William Lash Miller, examined the kinetics of reactions in inorganic salt solutions. The work formed the basis of her thesis, The rates of the reactions in solutions containing ferrous sulphate, potassium iodide, and chromic acid, published in the Journal of Physical Chemistry in May 1903.

== Career and research ==
Benson's early research was in the field of physical chemistry, with an emphasis on reaction rates of inorganic salt solutions. Her 1902 article "The Rate of Oxidation of Ferrous Salts by Chromic Acid" may make her the second female author (after Marie Curie) to publish in the Journal of Physical Chemistry (JPC).

As a woman, she had difficulty finding a job as a physical chemist after graduating, so she took a position as a demonstrator in food science at U of T's new Lillian Massey School of Domestic Science. She objected to this program's goal of preparing women to be housewives and had even signed a petition organized by University College's Women's Alumnae Association in 1902 questioning the program's introduction. At the time, however, food chemistry was one of the chemistry sub-fields with better professional opportunities for women.

This position involved switching from U of T's Chemistry Department to their Physiology (Physiological Chemistry) Department, where she was mentored by the "Father of the Medical School at Toronto," A.B. Macallum. Her subsequent research included biochemical examinations of fluid and tissue composition.

When food science was incorporated into U of T's medical curriculum in 1905, Benson was promoted to lecturer in physiological chemistry (biochemistry), making her the first woman at U of T to achieve a rank above demonstrator. In 1906, a royal commission report led to the creation of the Faculty of Household Science, of which Benson and the principal, Annie Laird, became associate professors, making them U of T's first female professors. Benson helped develop the school's food chemistry program and, in 1926, was promoted to full professor and head of the Department of Food Chemistry (a position she held until her retirement as professor emeritus in 1945).

Starting in 1915, she conducted summer studies at St. Andrews Biological Station examining the chemistry of seafood. At the request of Canada's Ministry of Marine and Fisheries, which was trying to build consumer demand for fish, she organized a group of food scientists from Canadian universities to work to improve fish preparation methods.

During World War I she developed and organized a course of instruction on ways to adapt food chemistry analysis techniques to explosives. These methods were adopted by munitions laboratories, helping standardized their production steps.

She was sole female founder of the American Society for Biological Chemistry (now the American Society for Biochemistry and Molecular Biology (ASBMB)) when it formed in December, 1906.

== Other interests and later life ==
Benson advocated for the development of women's athletics at the University of Toronto, co-chairing a committee on the matter and serving as the first president of the Women's Athletic Association from 1921 until her retirement. She sat on a committee of female faculty members formed in 1928 to fight for the creation of a women's athletic facility. When U of T opened their first women's gymnasium in 1959, they named it the Benson Building in her honor.

Benson served on the national board of the YWCA (Young Women's Christian Association), chairing their Foreign Committee, and her work with the organization led her to sponsor two French World War II orphans after her retirement. Her hobbies included stamp-collecting and traveling. She also enjoyed film-making, and videos she took while on some of her travels are housed at U of T's archives.

She was colleagues and friends with biochemist Maud Menten, who was also trained by Archibald Macallum.

Benson never married nor had children, and after retiring in 1945, she returned to Port Hope where she died March 24, 1964 (aged 89).

== Legacy ==
=== Firsts ===
- 1899: Benson became the first woman to earn a Bachelor of Arts in chemistry from the University of Toronto, only a few years after the university began admitting women.
- 1903: She was one of the first two women to earn a PhD from the University of Toronto.
- 1905: She became the first woman at the University of Toronto to hold an academic rank above demonstrator when she was appointed lecturer in physiological chemistry.
- 1906: She became one of the first women appointed associate professor at the University of Toronto.
- 1906: She was the only woman among the founders of the American Society for Biological Chemistry (now the American Society for Biochemistry and Molecular Biology).

=== Honors and awards ===
Professional recognition

- 1919: Benson was elected a Fellow of the Canadian Institute of Chemistry; in 1920, she was not allowed to attend the Institute’s annual dinner because she was a woman.
- 1920s: She was included in American Men of Science, a directory of leading scientists that also recognized women despite its title.

Institutional commemoration

- 1950: Alumnae of the University of Toronto’s Household Science program created a fellowship in her honour and commissioned a portrait of Benson by Yousuf Karsh for display in the Household Science building.
- 1959: The University of Toronto named the Benson Building, a women’s athletics facility, in her honour.

Legacy and named honours

- 1992: The Canadian Society of Chemistry established the Clara Benson Award, given each year to a woman chemist working in Canada.
- 2003: The University of Toronto marked the 100th anniversary of her PhD with a day of events, including a reenactment of her thesis defence.

== Selected publications ==
- Benson, Clara C. (January 1902). "The Rates of the Reactions in Solutions Containing Ferrous Sulphate, Potassium Iodide, and Chromic Acid". The Journal of Physical Chemistry. 7 (5): 356–388. doi:10.1021/j150050a003. ISSN 0092-7325.
- Benson, Clara C. (January 1902). "The Rate of Oxidation of Ferrous Salts by Chromic Acid". The Journal of Physical Chemistry. 7 (1): 1–14. doi:10.1021/j150046a001. hdl:2027/aeu.ark:/13960/t54f3kx43. ISSN 0092-7325.
- Benson, Clara C. (January 1902). "The Composition of the Surface Layers of Aqueous Amyl Alcohol". The Journal of Physical Chemistry. 7 (7): 532–536. doi:10.1021/j150052a002. ISSN 0092-7325.
- Macallum, A. B.; Benson, C. C. (1909-05-01). "On the Composition of Dilute Renal Excretions". Journal of Biological Chemistry. 6 (2): 87–104. doi:10.1016/S0021-9258(18)91621-2. ISSN 0021-9258.
