= John Hubert Craigie =

- Born: December 8, 1887
- Died: February 26, 1989 (aged 101)
- Known for: Research and development of rust-resistant cereals
- Awards: Flavelle Medal (1942); Order of Canada
- Scientific career
- Fields: Plant pathology

John Hubert Craigie, OC FRS FRSC (December 8, 1887 – February 26, 1989) was a Canadian plant pathologist. He is known for his "research and development of rust-resistant cereals which have been of vital significance to Canada as a cereal producing nation."

== Biography ==
Born in Merigomish, Pictou County, Nova Scotia, Craigie studied at Harvard University, the University of Minnesota, and the University of Manitoba. He was a founding member of the Dominion Rust Research Laboratory in Winnipeg, Manitoba in 1925. In 1930, he received a Ph.D. from the University of Manitoba. In 1926, he published "Discovery of the Function of the Pycnia of the Rust Fungi." From 1928 to 1945, he was in charge of the plant pathology section of the lab. From 1945 to 1952, he was the Dominion Botanist for the Department of Agriculture.

== Honours ==
In 1952, he was made a Fellow of the Royal Society. While a Fellow of the Royal Society of Canada, he was made an Officer of the Order of Canada in 1967. He was awarded honorary degrees from the University of British Columbia (1946), the University of Saskatchewan (1948), Dalhousie University (1951), and the University of Manitoba (1959). He was a charter member of the Canadian Phytopathological Society. In 1942, he was awarded the Royal Society of Canada's Flavelle Medal. In 1930, he was awarded the International Society for Plant Pathology's Jakob Eriksson Prize.
