= Henry Angus =

Canadian lawyer and academic

Henry Forbes Angus
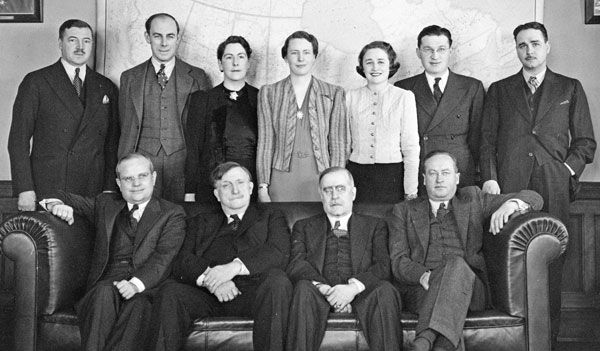
- The members of the Rowell-Sirois Commission in 1938. Seated, left, H. F. Angus.
- Born: April 19, 1891; Victoria, British Columbia
- Died: September 17, 1991 (aged 100)
- Awards: Order of Canada

Henry Forbes Angus OC (April 19, 1891 – September 17, 1991) was a Canadian lawyer and academic.

== Biography ==
Born in Victoria, British Columbia, Angus received a Bachelor of Arts from McGill University in 1911. He received a Bachelor of Arts and a Bachelor of Civil Law from Oxford University in 1914. He was awarded the Vinerian Scholarship. He fought in India during World War I. After the war, he received a Master of Arts from Oxford University. Returning to British Columbia, he was called to the Bar.

In 1919, he became an assistant professor of economics in the political science and sociology faculty at the University of British Columbia and later became professor and head of the department. He was the first fully qualified lawyer to serve on the full-time teaching staff. From 1948 until his retirement in 1956, he was the first Dean of Graduate Studies.

From 1937 to 1940, he was a member of the Royal Commission of Dominion–Provincial Relations. From 1949 to 1951, he was a member of the Royal Commission of Transportation.

During World War II, from 1941 to 1945, he was Special Assistant to the Secretary of State for External Affairs. He was one of the few public voices to oppose the Japanese Canadian internment.

In 1955, he was appointed chairman of the Public Utilities Commission of British Columbia. In 1965, he was chairman of the British Columbia Commission of inquiry into redefinition of Electoral Districts ("The Provincial Redistribution Commission").

From 1951 to 1952, he was the president of the Royal Society of Canada.

In 1971, he was made an officer of the Order of Canada. In 1956, he was awarded a Doctor of Laws, honoris causa, from the University of British Columbia. The Henry Angus Building at the University of British Columbia is named in his honour.

Professional and academic associations
Preceded by John Johnston O'Neill	President of the Royal Society of Canada; 1951–1952	Succeeded by Guilford Bevil Reed
