= Champagne (surname) =

Champagne is a French surname. Notable people with the surname include:

- Albert Champagne (1866–1937), Canadian rancher, hotel-owner and political figure
- Andre Champagne (born 1943), Canadian ice hockey player
- Andrée Champagne (1939–2020), Canadian actress, pianist and politician
- Charles Champagne (disambiguation), multiple people
- Claude Champagne (1891–1965), Canadian composer
- Claudette Champagne, Canadian social activist
- Connie Champagne (born 1959 as Kelly Kay Brock), American singer, songwriter and actor
- David B. Champagne (1932–1952), American navy corporal and Medal of Honor recipient
- Frances Champagne, Canadian neuroscientist
- François-Philippe Champagne (born 1970), Canadian politician
- Jean-François Champagne (1751–1813), French scholar
- Jérôme Champagne (born 1958), French diplomat
- Keith Champagne (born 1970), American comic artist
- Kenneth Champagne, Canadian judge
- Louis Champagne, Canadian actor
- Louis Champagne, Canadian talk radio personality
- Louis Napoléon Champagne (1860–1911), Canadian lawyer, judge and politician
- Michel Champagne (born 1956), Canadian politician and businessman
- Napoléon Champagne (1861–1925), Canadian politician
- Nereo Champagne (born 1985), Argentine football goalkeeper
- Noëlla Champagne (born 1944), Canadian politician
- Pascale Champagne, Canadian environmental engineer
- Peter B. Champagne (1845–1891), American politician
- Ronald Champagne (born 1942), American higher education administrator
- Salvatore Champagne, American operatic tenor

== See also ==
- Champagnie, surname
