= Wynn family (Ontario) =

Canadian business family

- Current region: Ontario, Canada; The Bahamas
- Founder: David Weinzweig
- Members: Philip Weinzweig (a.k.a. Phil Wynn); Paul Wynn; Jeffrey Weinzweig (a.k.a. Jeff Wynn); Leslie Wynn; Joshua Wynn

The Wynn family is a Canadian business family. They are best known for their real estate ventures, although they have been active in other sectors at a regional level. Starting as sofa manufacturers in Toronto, they grew into one of the area's major landlords in the 1960s under second-generation member Philip Wynn, and reoriented towards international markets under his children. They primarily do business as The Wynn Group of Companies and Gold Wynn. One of Philip's sons, Paul, also ventured into film production in the 1990s and 2000s. They are unrelated to Las Vegas hotel developer Steve Wynn.

== History ==
The family was established in Canada by David Weinzweig (?–1978), a Polish immigrant of Jewish descent, who operated an upholstery business in Toronto. Two of his four children, sons Alex (1923 or 1924–2001) and Philip (1931–2016) followed him in the family trade. Alex legally changed his name to Wynn, which Philip also started going by. Philip branched out into rental real estate. It became the foundation of the family's eventual fortune, and by 1988, his net worth was estimated at CAD$100 million. His three sons, Paul (born 1960), Jeffrey (born 1962) and Leslie (born 1965) progressively took over their father's activities, doing business as The Wynn Group of Companies or Wynn Family Properties. Paul and Leslie also legally changed their name to Wynn. Through the 2010s, the three brothers refocused their efforts towards foreign markets under the Wynn Group International and Gold Wynn names, before choosing the latter as their main brand. A fourth-generation member, Leslie's son Joshua (born 1991) has also been active in real estate via The Wynn Group and his own company Blue Dawn Properties.

== Furniture ==
The first mention of Weinzweig's Toronto upholstery business comes around 1928. He worked for a variety of companies. before settling at BonTon Studios, which he operated with his wife. Circa 1952, BonTon morphed into Famous Upholsterers, which would remain with his son Alex. The Wynn Group pegs the beginning of its modern history to 1951. Another one of David's sons, Philip, was studying at McMaster towards an accounting career but joined the family trade as a side job. He did so well that he left university to focus on it, leading to the establishment of his own Wynn Furniture Company in 1958. Phil Wynn did early business as the Dominion Chesterfield Company and BestWay Upholsterers, before creating what would be his main brand, National Furniture.

One of his early headquarters, located at Yonge and Wellington streets, burned down in March 1960 with CAD$20,000 worth of sofas inside, just as the building was due to be demolished to make way for the upcoming Meridian Hall's parking lot. After moving a few times, Wynn opened a new factory at King and Bathurst streets in 1964, National Furniture vacated the premises in 1981 when the building was demolished. It relocated to Mississauga, from where it grew into a chain of six locations throughout the Greater Toronto Area, reporting sales of about CAD$20 million a year. The chain hit hard times in the second half of the 1990s, and contracted thereafter, despite attempts to supplement its core business with appliance retail.

== Real estate ==
=== Canada ===
Noticing a lack of furnished rentals in Toronto, Philip Wynn started renting apartments under pseudonyms to furnish them with his product, and sublet them. According to the Toronto Star, one of his aliases was "Mr. Phillips". His activities were eventually accepted and even rewarded by some building owners, who were struggling to find tenants. In 1961, Wynn purchased his first apartment building at 31 Spencer Ave. for about CAD$400,000, largely financed with securities. Within the following decade, he accrued some 1,500 units across a dozen properties, making him one of the top landlords in Toronto's west end, and the city's largest private landlord. Many of his purchases were secured through mortgages, requiring a high return on investment. Wynn's main real estate entity was Pajelle Investments, whose name was a composite of his sons' first names: Paul, Jeff and Les.

The Wynns started running the business as a family in 1984, although Philip's youngest son, Leslie, joined in earnest in 1991. By the end of the 1990s, Philip Wynn had retired and Jeffrey was managing the day-to-day operations of the family's residential portfolio, consisting of 3400 units across 22 buildings. Among the main corporate entities used by the Wynn heirs was Bnai Fishel Corporation ('Sons of Philip' in Yiddish). By the late 2010s, they controlled some 4500 residential units. They had also accrued 3 million square feet of commercial real estate. Their flagship property was the DunWynn Centre, a mall opened on East Dundas Street circa 1990, which at one time housed both National Furniture and Wynn Fitness locations. The company has also developed property for sale, such as Olde Thornhill Village, a townhouse ensemble built in 2004 and beyond in Markham.

In April 2018, the Wynn Group divested itself of most of its Toronto portfolio, selling to Timbercreek Asset Management for US$1 billion, with an eye on furthering its international growth.

=== Caribbean ===
In 2014, The Wynn Group acquired the historic Gold Blossom Estate in Nassau, Bahamas, and replaced it with an apartment building, the Goldwynn Residences, which was completed in 2023 at a cost of US$120 million. The Gold Blossom name informed the rebrand of their international activities as Gold Wynn. They were also approached to take over the embattled Grand Lucayan hotel in Freeport, but negotiations did not pan out. In 2019, Wynn opened the Presidential Suites, located within the Lifestyle Holidays Vacation Resort in Puerto Plata, Dominican Republic. In 2022, the Wynn Group announced that Nassau would replace Toronto as its main corporate headquarters. The Wynn brothers claim permanent residence in The Bahamas.

=== United States ===
During the 2010s, the Wynn Group intensified its investments in the U.S. Originally looking into Texas, it ended up choosing Tulsa in nearby Oklahoma, acquiring 900 units worth US$27 million within less than a year in 2014–15 and opening an office branch there. The Wynns had accrued 1,500 residential units in the area by 2019.

Buffalo, New York, a natural extension of the Toronto market, was another key target. The Wynns earned notice with the refurbishing of the historic Buffalo Athletic Club building in 2018, and the 2019 purchase of 870 residential units, described as "one of the biggest in years" by the Buffalo News. As of 2021, they owned about 2,000 residential units and 300,000 square feet of commercial space in Buffalo. Around 2023, the company started trimming its Buffalo portfolio to focus on larger buildings. Leslie Wynn's son Joshua has also been active in Western New York via his Blue Dawn Properties group.

=== United Kingdom ===
The Wynns have started building a rental portfolio in the U.K., buying the former Northern and Shell Tower in London's Isle of Dogs and Station House, an office building part of the Milton Keynes Central railway station ensemble, for redevelopment. In 2023, the family is also a major shareholder in London-based bridge lending firm Blue Shield Capital.

=== Israel ===
The company has some interests in Israel, particularly in the Tel Aviv area. In addition to various apartment buildings, the Wynn family controls a share of Reality Investment Funds, which manages the Arena mall in nearby Herzliya.

== Fitness ==
In partnership with a Swiss entrepreneur named Markus Lanz, the Wynns created Wynn Fitness Clubs in 2007. Starting with Mississauga and Richmond Hill locations, it grew to six GTA locations by mid-2011. It later contracted due to property management and COVID-19 issues, and was back down to two Toronto locations by the end of 2021. In 2019, the company announced the opening of a club in one of its buildings in Buffalo, New York, but it does not seem to have happened. However, a Wynn Fitness club was integrated into the Goldwynn Residences, which opened in 2023 in Nassau, Bahamas.

== Film production ==
A cinephile, third-generation family member Paul Wynn worked for a movie company in the 1980s, before venturing into production himself.

=== Annex Entertainment ===
In 1998, Paul Wynn founded Annex Entertainment with former Paragon Entertainment COO Richard Borchiver and Trimark Pictures co-founder Barry Barnholtz. The company was mainly backed by Wynn, and was based at the Wynn Group's office inside The Annex Centre. It also shared some legal and accounting personnel with it. It was unrelated to The Annex Entertainment, a Toronto film sales company established in 2015.

Among Annex's production partners were John Gillespie of Trinity Pictures, Jalal Merhi of Film One, and industry veteran Damian Lee, who brought with him a production service relationship with Ashok Amritraj and Andrew Stevens of Phoenician Entertainment. Annex's first film, Woman Wanted, was a service production for Phoenician shot in Winnipeg, Manitoba, in the Summer of 1998. A former Winnipeg steam plant was also considered for remodel into a CAD$45–50 million studio for Annex and American partners such as Franchise Pictures (Phoenician's parent) and Lewitt/Eberts Productions, although the plan remained tentative.

After one year mostly dedicated to service jobs, the company stepped into first party products, of which a modest number made it to the screen. Unproduced projects included TV series based on children's licenses Micronauts and Shivers, as well as two $6–8 million high concept thrillers from writer Robert Boris, The Chunnel and High Water Mark (set at the Hoover Dam). Wynn's pet project appeared to be My Best Friend's Mother, a Jewish comedy credited to one Ben Fishel (which, like an above mentioned subsidiary, translates to 'Son of Philip'). Annex was still present at the May 2001 Cannes Film Market.

=== Later projects ===
At that year's next big event, October's MIFED (Mercato internazionale del film e del documentario), Wynn and Lee briefly resurfaced under a new banner, simply called Lee Wynn. My Best Friend's Mother was the sole holdover from Annex's slate, but none of the new outfit's projects appear to have reached production. Mid-2004, Lee and Wynn returned with another company, Lee Nasso Wynn, in association with veteran American producer Julius R. Nasso. But Wynn was not credited on Lee and Nasso's eventual efforts. According to Merhi, Wynn was dissatisfied with the profitability of his film ventures and opted to withdraw from the sector.

== Philanthropy ==
The Wynns have named Birthright Israel, the Jewish National Fund, the Israel Cancer Research Fund, Mount Sinai Hospital and Toronto Western Hospital as some of the institutions they have donated to. The Jerusalem Foundation's Phil and Cees Wynn Business Centre at Canada House and the Tel Aviv Foundation's Cees and Phil Wynn Beach Sports Community Center were realized thanks to contributions from the Wynn family. They have also supported the Canadian Jewish Political Affairs Committee.

== Controversies ==
Philip Wynn's rise has been punctuated by many battles with tenants' rights advocates, such as the New Democratic Party and Parkdale Community Legal Services. Acquaintances interviewed by The Globe and Mail described him as "driven by an overwhelming ambition to be a financial success at almost any social cost." Wynn has faced scrutiny for unfair rent practices, involving the circumvention of rent control policies and the withholding of legally mandated refunds, such as security deposits and tax rebates. Per the Toronto Star, in 1969 he was involved in 20 percent of all lawsuits pertaining to the Basic Shelter Exemption, a provincial tax break that landlords had to pass onto their tenants.

His companies have repeatedly been accused of neglecting their rental properties and criticized for understaffing buildings, trading free rent for maintenance work. Some blamed part of Wynn's reputation on the disadvantaged tenants his buildings catered to, and a combative attitude that made him more visible than his peers. In 1972, the Star accused mayoral candidate David Rotenberg of attempting to conceal a mortgage he held on a building owned by another of Wynn's companies, Jeff-Paul Investments, which Rotenberg insisted was a misunderstanding. Wynn's activities were the catalyst for two landmark 1975 decisions imposing stricter obligations on landlords at the provincial and Supreme Court levels, the latter of which (Pajelle Investments Ltd. v. Herbold) Osgoode scholar Brian Bucknall directly attributed to Wynn's confrontational personality. The senior Wynn countered: "Only I can handle these buildings. Everybody else would be out on his ear in six months."

In 1994, Toronto's director of inspections Pamela Coburn assessed, "Our previous experience with [The Wynn Group] is that work doesn't get done until the 11th hour, if it gets done at all." According to Wynn's sons Jeffrey and Paul, they made strides to move past the stigma attached to their father's operation, and the bulk of remaining problems revolved around the West Lodge Apartments, a perennially embattled complex that other landlords had also struggled with. Their claims have received a mixed response.
