= Donald K. Johnson Eye Centre =

Coordinates: 43.658°N 79.387°W

Donald K. Johnson Eye Institute
- University Health Network

Geography
- Location: Toronto Western Hospital,, Toronto, Ontario, Canada

Organization
- Care system: Public Medicare (Canada) (OHIP)
- Type: Research, patient care, and teaching
- Affiliated university: University of Toronto

Links
- Website: https://www.uhn.ca/EyeInstitute
- Lists: Hospitals in Canada

The Donald K. Johnson Eye Centre is Canada's largest clinical and research institute for vision. It is located in Toronto at the Toronto Western Hospital.

== Patient care ==
The Donald K. Johnson Eye Centre has the largest ophthalmology program in Canada treating more the 65,000 patients and conducting more than 4,200 surgeries annually. It has the largest Retinal Surgery Unit in North America, one of the largest Glaucoma Units in the Canada, and performs the largest number of corneal transplants nationally.

The Centre treats the most complex retinal diseases, including diabetic retinopathy, retinal detachment, and macular degeneration.

== Research ==
The Donald K. Johnson Eye Centre Research Institute is a joint venture between Toronto Western Hospital and the University of Toronto. Research areas include: Molecular genetics of blinding eye diseases and brain disorders; Treatment, biophysics and psychophysics of glaucoma; Eye movement and control mechanisms; Neuronal damage; Retinal degeneration and diabetic retinopathy; Corneal disease

== Education ==
The centre has the largest ophthalmology residency-training program in Canada, run in cooperation with the Faculty of Medicine at the University of Toronto. It has the largest ophthalmology subspecialty program in Canada, including fellowship training in glaucoma, retinal, and corneal disease.

== Leadership ==
The Ophthalmologist-in-Chief is Dr. Robert Devenyi. The Director of the Research Institute is Dr. Martin Steinbach.

The centre was named in November 2007 following a $5 million gift from Donald K. Johnson who also chairs a $15 million campaign in support of the centre.
