= West Lodge Apartments =

Apartment complex in Toronto

Coordinates: 43.64526°N 79.43601°W

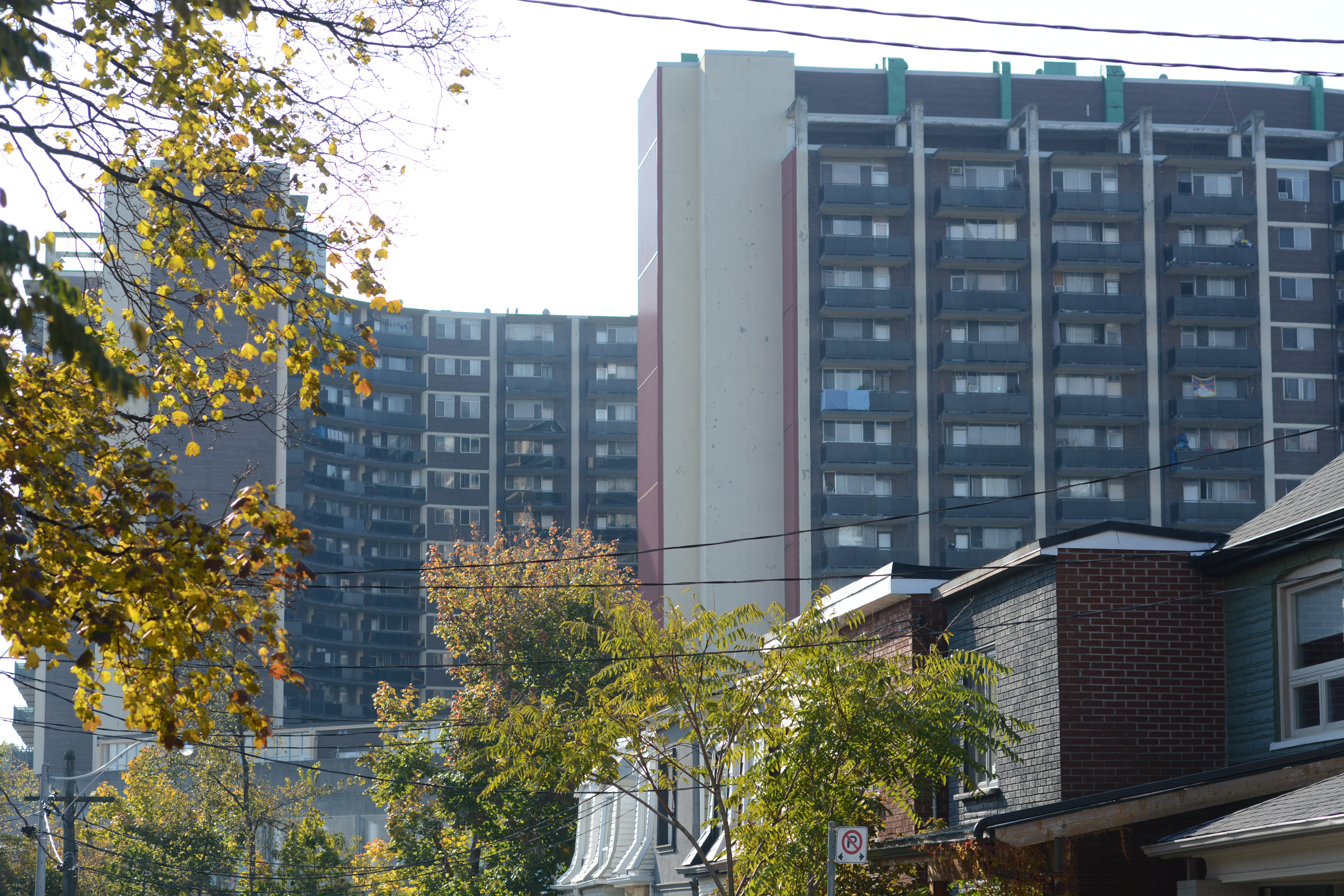
West Lodge as seen from the south from West Lodge Avenue

West Lodge Apartments, also known simply as West Lodge, is a 720 unit apartment complex located at 103 and 105 West Lodge Avenue in Parkdale, Toronto. The complex consists of two curved 18 story towers joined at the base by a 5-story segment which includes a convenience store on the second floor.

The complex was built in 1964 and by the mid 1970s had already become notorious as the source of numerous building code violations, and for its general state of disrepair. The apartments have been the site of decades of tenant organizing continuing up to the present. Most notably, tenants in the 1970s were able to bring a case before the Supreme Court of Canada in October 1975 and organize a substantial bid to buy the complex from the City of Toronto and convert it into co-operative housing - a bid that ultimately failed when the building's previous owners put in a higher bid at the last minute. Through the 2010s and 2020s the building has continued to be a subject of concern, receiving in 2016 the most code violations of any building in the city. In 2020, during the COVID-19 pandemic, tenants occupied a vacant unit on the second floor of 103 West Lodge, which now serves as a food bank for tenants.

== Revolving ownership ==
The property has passed through the hands of numerous owners since its construction, including a period of receivership where it was owned by the City of Toronto. Past owners include Bnai Fishel, a subsidiary of The Wynn Group, Timbercreek Asset Management,. and Hazelview Properties. It is currently owned by Morguard
