= Bahamian passport =

Travel document

- Bahamian passport front cover
- Type: Passport
- Issued by: Bahamas
- First issued: 6 December 2016 (current version)
- Purpose: Identification
- Eligibility: Bahamian citizenship
- Expiration: 10 years (16 and over) 5 years (Under 16)
- Cost: B$ 50.00 Adult Passport B$ 25.00 Children’s Passport

The Bahamian passport is issued to citizens of The Bahamas for international travel.

As of July 2025, Bahamian citizens had visa-free or visa on arrival access to 161 countries and territories, ranking the Bahamian passport 20th in terms of travel freedom according to the Henley Passport Index

As Commonwealth citizens, Bahamians may receive consular assistance from British embassies and consulates in foreign non-Commonwealth nations during emergencies where their home country has not established diplomatic or consular posts. They are eligible to apply for British emergency passports, if their travel documents have been lost or stolen and permission has been given by the local government.

== Passport message ==
Passports contain a message, to other countries stating that the bearer of the passport is a citizen of the country, and to provide him or her safe passage. The message reads:

"These are to request and require in the name of the Governor-General of the Commonwealth of the Bahamas all those whom it may concern to allow the bearer to pass freely without let or hindrance and to afford him or her every assistance and protection of which he or she may stand in need."

== Appearance ==
A regular passport is navy blue, with the Coat of arms of The Bahamas emblazoned on the front cover. The words "COMMONWEALTH OF THE BAHAMAS" and "PASSPORT" along with the international e-passport symbol are below. The passport contains 50 pages for entry/exit stamps and visas. Additionally, the biodata page is made of polycarbonate.

=== Data page ===
- Type (PA)
- Country code (BHS)
- Passport No.
- Photo of the holder
- Surname
- Given Names
- Nationality (Bahamian)
- Date of Birth
- Sex
- Place of Birth
- National Insurance Number
- Date of issuance
- Date of expiry
- Place of Issue

The information ends with the Machine Readable Zone beginning in PABHS.

== See also ==
- Visa requirements for Bahamian citizens
- Caribbean passport
- List of passports
