= Kim Baines =

Chemist

Academic background
- Education: Saint Mary's University
- Alma mater: University of Toronto
- Thesis: (1987)
- Website: https://publish.uwo.ca/~kbaines2/

Kim Baines PhD FRSC FRSC is a professor of organic chemistry at the University of Western Ontario. In 2022 she was elected as a Fellow of the Royal Society of Canada. She was the inaugural chair of the DEI working group of the Chemical Institute of Canada. The Lipson-Baines Awards in Chemistry is named in part for her.

== Awards ==
- Rio Tinto Award (2023)
- J.C. Polanyi Prize for Chemistry (1988)
- Clara Benson Award from the Canadian Society for Chemistry (2002)
- Humboldt Research Award (2015)
- F.S. Kipping Award from the American Chemical Society (2022)
