= Stephanie Macquarrie =

Canadian chemist

Stephanie MacQuarrie
- Education: Mount Allison University, Virginia Tech
- Scientific career
- Fields: organic chemistry, materials chemistry
- Workplaces: Cape Breton University
- Thesis: Design and Synthesis of Novel Benzodiazepines (2005)
- Doctoral advisor: Paul R. Carlier
- Website: https://www.macquarrieresearch.ca/stephanie

Stephanie MacQuarrie is a Canadian organic materials chemist and a Professor of Chemistry at Cape Breton University. Her research has spanned many areas of chemistry, including organic synthesis, organometallic catalysis, and materials characterization. She has contributed to the use of biochar as a green material for use in various chemical processes, including collaboration with Professor Francesca M. Kerton. In 2021, she was elected as the Director for Equity, Diversity, and Inclusion for the Canadian Society for Chemistry. She was recognized by the Cape Breton University Alumni Award for Teaching Excellence in 2017. In 2023, she was named one of the inaugural NSERC Chairs for Inclusion in Science and Engineering. She was elected as a Fellow of the Chemical Institute of Canada (FCIC) in 2024.

== Early career ==
Professor MacQuarrie completed her B.Sc. in chemistry at Mount Allison University in 1996. She earned her Ph.D. in chemistry at Virginia Tech under the supervision of Professor Paul Carlier, graduating in 2005. She was a postdoctoral fellow at Queen's University in the laboratory of Professor Cathleen Crudden from 2005 to 2009. She was appointed to a faculty position at Cape Breton University in 2009.
