= Krembil Research Institute =

Academic medical research institute in Toronto

Coordinates: 43.65338°N 79.40563°W

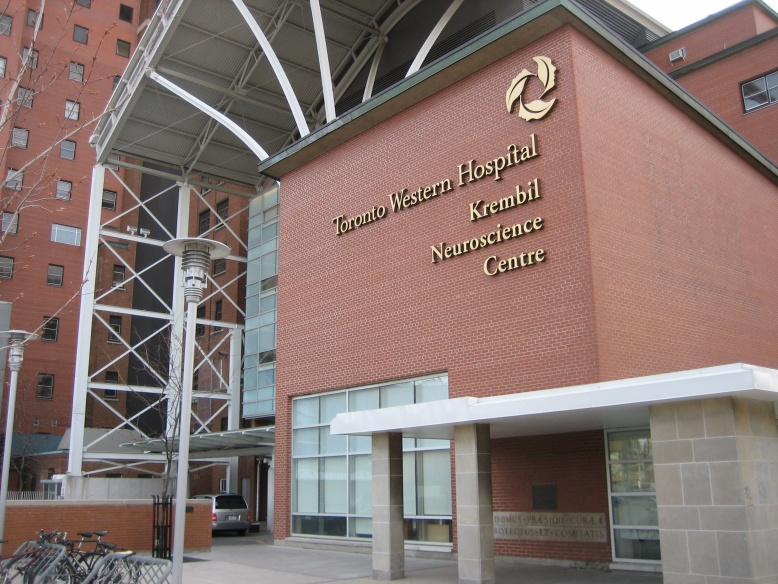
Toronto Western Hospital's Krembil Neuroscience Centre

The Krembil Research Institute, formerly known as the Toronto Western Research Institute, is an academic medical research institute in Toronto. It is one of the largest research institutes in Canada focusing on human neurological disease.

Krembil is one of the principal research institutes of the University Health Network and is the research institute of the Toronto Western Hospital.

Krembil researches treatments for Alzheimer's disease, Parkinson's disease, epilepsy, stroke, brain tumours, concussions, spinal cord injuries, neuro-ophthalmologic and other ocular disorders, multiple sclerosis and autoimmune disorders.

== History ==
In the early 1980s, Toronto Western took on additional neurological and neurosurgical care responsibilities for the UHN group. In 1980, the Playfair Neuroscience Institute was created. In 1999, it was renamed the Toronto Western Research Institute. The Institute added research areas in ophthalmology, rheumatology and orthopaedics. By 2004, under the founding leadership of neurosurgeon C. Wallace, the Krembil had emerged as one of the largest research institutes in Canada with a neuroscience emphasis.

On November 13, 2015, the Krembil took on its current name from the Krembil family. In 2013, the Krembil Discovery Tower opened at Toronto Western.

== Research Activities ==
Krembil neuroscientists explore the function of the nervous system as they develop treatments for neurodegenerative diseases such as Alzheimer's disease and Parkinson's disease, epilepsy, spinal cord injuries, cerebral ischemia (stroke), vascular brain malformations, aneurysms, brain tumours and pain disorders.

The Krembil is also home to the Vision Science Research Program, a joint UHN/University of Toronto Program. This research is directed into the following areas: molecular genetics of blinding eye diseases with brain disorders; treatment and biophysics of glaucoma; eye movement control mechanisms; neuronal damage; retinal degeneration and diabetic retinopathy.

Arthritis and associated rheumatological degenerative diseases are the focus of the researchers in the musculoskeletal research program at the Krembil as part of the UHN Arthritis and Autoimmunity Research Centre. Their investigations are aimed at revealing the causes of, and generating therapies for, these autoimmune and orthopaedic ailments.

In September 2021, Krembil took ownership of the World Community Grid from IBM.

== Krembil and UHN Neuroscience achievements ==
- First in world to describe Progressive Supranuclear Palsy (PSP; Steele-Richardson-Olszewski Syndrome) as a unique form of dementia and neurodegenerative disease involving the gradual deterioration and death of specific volumes of the brain (J. Steele, J. Richardson & J. Olszewski, 1963)
- First in world to show the reversibility of brain shrinkage and dysfunction from alcoholism with abstinence. (P. Carlen, 1978)
- Showed genetic predisposition to developing Reflex Sympathetic Dystrophy. (A. Mailis, 1994)
- Performed the first deep brain stimulation in Canada to effectively control Parkinson's symptoms. (A. Lozano, 1994),
- Awake craniotomy with same day discharge for brain tumor removal using image guided approach. (M. Bernstein, 1996)
- Identified genes responsible for hereditary blindness, Alzheimer's, ALS and Huntington's disease. (P. St. George Hyslop, 1990s),
- First in Canada to use Image-Guided Minimally Invasive Therapy (IGMIT) during surgery allowing for real-time magnetic resonance imaging to guide surgeons to the location of a brain tumor. (M. Bernstein, 1998)
- Identified the individual brain cells that control pain. (K. Davis and A. Lozano, 1998)
- Identified of protein that triggers autoimmune response in Sjögren's syndrome, as well as a vaccine to treat the condition. (A. Bookman, 2002)
- Developed method for detecting gene mutations that enhance care for families with retinoblastoma. (B. Gallie, 2003)
- Performed the world's first deep brain stimulation for treatment resistant depression. (A. Lozano & S. Kennedy, 2003)
- Neural adult stem cell transplantation findings show promising results in repairing spinal cord damage and restoring mobility in rats. (M. Fehlings & S. Karimi, 2006)
- Performed the world's first deep brain stimulation for treatment of Alzheimer's Disease (A. Lozano, 2012),
- Development of new experimental drug for the neuroprotectant treatment of stroke (M. Tymianski, 2012)

== Krembil Directors ==
- 1980–1988 – William Tatton
- 1988–1990 – Charles Tator (interim)
- 1990–1999 – Peter Carlen
- 1999–2004 – Christopher Wallace
- 2004–2011 – Peter St George-Hyslop
- 2011–2013 – Peter Carlen (interim)
- 2013–2022 – Donald F. Weaver
- 2022–present – Jaideep Bains

Christopher Wallace MD, MSc, FRCSC, a neurosurgeon and neurophysiologist, was the first official director of the Krembil; his research focussed on therapeutic approaches to vascular brain injury. Peter St George-Hyslop MD, PhD, FRCPC, a neurologist and PhD geneticist, was the second full-time director of the Krembil; his research focussed on the genetic basis of neurodegenerative diseases such as Alzheimer's dementia.

== Facilities ==
Krembil occupies 105,000 ft^{2} (9,800 m^{2}) at Toronto Western Hospital for basic science, clinical, imaging and epidemiological research. In 2011, the Krembil was home to 122 biomedical researchers, 206 technical/support staff and 157 research trainees, who collectively produced 515 peer-reviewed publications supported by more than $43,612,000 of external research funding.

In 2013, Krembil expanded into an additional 325,000 ft^{2} (30,200 m^{2}) of space, spanning nine floors, in the Krembil Discovery Tower. The Tower space includes 150,000 ft^{2} (14,000 m^{2}) of "wet" laboratory bench space for Krembil basic science researchers.

Krembil receives support from the Toronto General/Toronto Western Hospital Foundation which is currently embarked upon a $200 million "Brain Campaign" to support neuroscience research at Krembil. The campaign had raised over $273 million as of January 2016.

== Strategic research alliances ==
The Krembil has many strategic research alliances, nationally and internationally, to facilitate and enhance the delivery of its research mandate. Two of the strategic research alliances are:

- The Tanz Centre for Research in Neurodegenerative Diseases (Tanz CRND) is a research institute at the University of Toronto, under the umbrella of the Faculty of Medicine, with a focus on the spectrum of neurodegenerative diseases.
- Toronto Dementia Research Alliance (TDRA) is a Toronto-wide network of researchers focused on the understanding and treatment of all forms of dementia.
