= Robert Devenyi =

Canadian ophthalmologist

Robert G. Devenyi is a Canadian vitreoretinal surgeon and Professor of Ophthalmology at the University of Toronto. He is the team ophthalmologist for the Toronto Maple Leafs (NHL) and has treated sports-related eye injuries.

Devenyi is the ophthalmologist-in-chief and director of retinal services at the University Health Network (UHN), a healthcare and research institution affiliated with the University of Toronto. He is also co-director of the Donald K. Johnson Eye Institute at Toronto Western Hospital, which focusses on ophthalmic care, education, and vision research.

At the University of Toronto, Devenyi supervises vitreoretinal surgery fellowships and has contributed to academic training in ophthalmology. His research covers vitreoretinal diseases, surgical innovations, and retinopathies, with peer-reviewed publications in these areas.

Devenyi was the first surgeon in Canada to implant the Argus retinal prosthesis device, designed to restore partial vision in patients blinded by degenerative conditions like Retinitis Pigmentosa. However, the long-term efficacy and accessibility of the prosthesis remains a topic of ongoing research and debate within the medical community.
