= Marvin H. Caruthers =

American biochemist

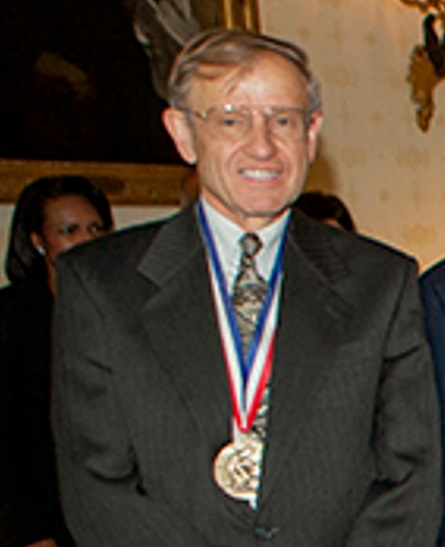
- Born: February 11, 1940 (age 86); Des Moines, Iowa, U.S.
- Education: Iowa State University, Northwestern University
- Known for: DNA Synthesis
- Scientific career
- Fields: Biochemistry
- Workplaces: University of Colorado Boulder
- Thesis: The Synthesis of Oligothymidylate Derivatives on Insoluble Polymer Supports (1968)
- Doctoral advisor: Robert L. Letsinger
- Other academic advisors: Har Gobind Khorana, George Rathmann

Marvin H. Caruthers (born February 11, 1940) is an American biochemist who is a distinguished professor at the University of Colorado Boulder.

Caruthers earned a B.S in chemistry at the Iowa State University in 1962 and a Ph.D. in biochemistry 1968 at Northwestern University with Robert Letsinger. He did his postdoctoral work at Massachusetts Institute of Technology with Har Gobind Khorana. From 1973 he was assistant professor and in 1980 professor of biochemistry at the University of Colorado at Boulder.

His research is on nucleic acids. He and his research group developed methods for the phosphoramidite synthesis of DNA. Using this technique, his group was able to incorporate nucleotide analogs for functional group mutagenesis for a deeper understanding of nucleic acid biochemistry. In addition to DNA, he developed methods of RNA synthesis and also for DNA analogues and the applications of the resulting molecules. He was a co-founder of Amgen and Applied Biosystems with Leroy Hood.

In 1994 Caruthers was elected a member of the National Academy of Sciences and a Fellow of the American Academy of Arts and Sciences in 1994. He received the National Medal of Science (2006), the NAS Award for Chemistry in Service to Society (2005) and the NAS Award in Chemical Sciences (2014). In 1980 he was awarded a Guggenheim Fellowship.
