= Kelvin Ogilvie =

Canadian politician (1942–2025)

The Honourable Kelvin Ogilvie CM
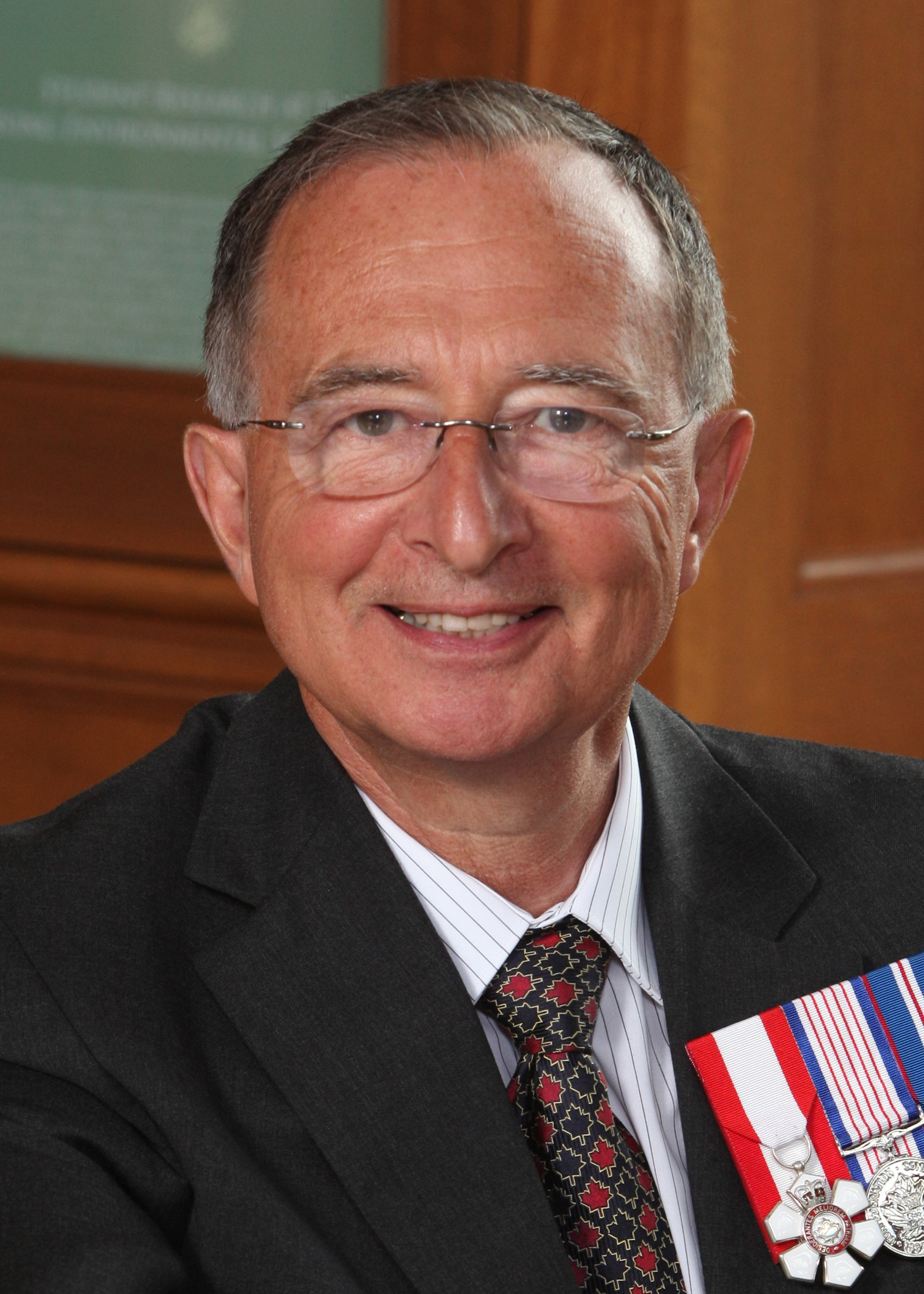
- Ogilvie in 2012

Senator for Annapolis Valley-Hants, Nova Scotia
- In office August 27, 2009 – November 6, 2017
- Nominated by: Stephen Harper
- Appointed by: Michaëlle Jean

Personal details
- Born: Kelvin Kenneth Ogilvie; November 6, 1942 Summerville, Nova Scotia, Canada
- Died: July 15, 2025 (aged 82)
- Party: Conservative
- Scientific career
- Fields: Chemical Synthesis of RNA
- Workplaces: University of Manitoba, McGill University, Acadia University
- Academic advisors: Robert L. Letsinger
- Notable students: Masad Damha, Serge Beaucage, Mona Nemer

Kelvin Kenneth Ogilvie CM (November 6, 1942 – July 15, 2025) was a Canadian academic and politician. An expert in bioorganic chemistry and genetic engineering, Ogilvie served as president of Acadia University in Wolfville from 1993 to 2003 and was named to the Senate of Canada as a Conservative on August 27, 2009. He served until his retirement on November 6, 2017.

== Scientific career ==
Ogilvie was a leading expert in bioorganic chemistry and genetic engineering. His scientific accomplishments include the development of the chemistry of the Bio Logicals’ “Gene Machine”, an automated process for the manufacture of DNA. He is the inventor of Ganciclovir, a drug used worldwide to fight infections (Cytomegalovirus or CMV) that occur when one’s immune system is weakened. He also developed a general method for the chemical synthesis of large RNA molecules, demonstrated by the first total chemical synthesis of a functional Transfer RNA (tRNA) molecule, which is still the basis for RNA synthesis worldwide.

Ogilvie was a chemistry professor at the University of Manitoba from 1968 to 1974, at McGill University from 1974 to 1987, and at Acadia University from 1987 to 1993 while also serving as vice-president (academic). He has received numerous awards during his long and prestigious career including being named a Steacie Fellow in 1982, admission to the Order of Canada in 1991, the Manning Principal Award as Canada’s outstanding contributor to innovation in 1992, induction into the Canadian Science and Engineering Hall of Fame in 2011 and the Rx&D Health Research Foundation Medal of Honour in 2013.

== Administrative and political career ==
Ogilvie served for three years as chair of Nova Scotia Premier’s Council for Innovation and was Senior Fellow for Postsecondary Education at the Atlantic Institute for Market Studies, a rightwing thinktank. He served on the board of Genome Canada and chaired the advisory board of National Research Council’s Institute of Marine Bioscience and the Advisory Board of the Atlantic Innovation Fund.

Ogilvie was named to the Order of Canada in 1991.

He was president and vice-chancellor of Acadia University from 1993 to 2003.

From 1993 to 2003 he served as president and vice-chancellor of Acadia University in Wolfville, Nova Scotia, where he led the development and implementation of the acclaimed Acadia Advantage Program, which was recognized by and incorporated into the Permanent Collection of the Smithsonian Institution in Washington, D.C., in 1999. His time at Acadia was controversial especially with the alumni association.

He was appointed to the Canadian Senate by Prime Minister Stephen Harper on August 27, 2009, and he retired in November 2017. While in the Senate he chaired the Standing Senate Committee on Social Affairs, Science and Technology that produced a number of important studies on health issues affecting Canadians. The last report was “The Role of Robotics, 3D Printing and Artificial Intelligence in the Healthcare System” (November 2017).

== Personal life and death ==
Ogilvie was born in Summerville, Nova Scotia in 1942, to Carl and Mabel (née Wile) Ogilvie. He was married to Roleen Lockhart for 61 years and had two children. Ogilvie died on July 15, 2025, at the age of 82.
