= Howard Alper =

Canadian chemist

- Born: October 17, 1941 (age 84); Montreal, Quebec
- Education: Sir George Williams University; McGill University
- Awards: Order of Canada
- Scientific career
- Fields: Chemistry
- Institutions: State University of New York; University of Ottawa
- Thesis: Reactions of iron pentacarbonyl with organic compounds (1967)
- Doctoral advisor: John "Jack" T. Edward
- Doctoral students: Cathleen Crudden

Howard Alper, CC FRSC (born October 17, 1941) is a Canadian chemist. He is a Professor of Chemistry at the University of Ottawa. He is best known for his research of catalysis in chemistry.

== Career and research ==
Born in Montreal, Quebec, he received a Bachelor of Science from Sir George Williams University in 1963 and a Ph.D. from McGill University in 1967. In 1968, he started teaching at the State University of New York and became an associate professor in 1971. He joined the University of Ottawa in 1975 as an associate professor and was appointed a Professor in 1978, later being made a Distinguished University Professor in 2006. He has published over 400 papers, has over forty patents, and has edited several books.

He was the vice-president (Research) of the University of Ottawa from 1997 to 2006. From 2001 to 2003, he was the President of the Royal Society of Canada.

Alper served as the Chair of Canada’s Science, Technology and Innovation Council from 2007 to 2015, and as one of the two co-chairs of the InterAcademy Panel on International Issues from 2006 to 2013.

== Honours ==
He was named a Fellow of the Royal Society of Canada in 1984. In 1998, he was made an Officer of the Order of Canada. In 2000, he was awarded the first Gerhard Herzberg Canada Gold Medal for Science and Engineering, Canada's highest research honour in the field. In 2014, he was made a Commander of the Order of Merit of the Italian Republic. He was elevated to a Companion of the Order of Canada in 2020. In 2015, Professor Alper was awarded an honorary Ph.D. by the University of Pretoria.

Professional and academic associations
Preceded by William Leiss	President of the Royal Society of Canada; 2001–2003	Succeeded by Gilles Paquet
