= Masad Damha =

Masad J. Damha (born 1960) is a Canadian academic and nucleic acid researcher. He is Distinguished James McGill Professor of Chemistry at McGill University in Montreal, Quebec, Canada.

== Education and career ==
After growing up in Managua, Nicaragua, Damha moved to Montreal, Quebec, Canada in 1978 for his post-secondary education and received his BSc’83 and PhD’88 degrees from McGill, the latter under the supervision of Prof. Kelvin Ogilvie. He then accepted a position as assistant professor at the University of Toronto's Erindale College (UTM) from 1987–1992, at which point he returned to McGill University where he has been teaching ever since.

== Research ==
Damha's group developed 2'-deoxy-2'-fluoroarabinonucleic acid (2'F-ANA) in 1998, which was the first sugar-modified oligonucleotide to allow cleavage by the enzyme RNase H. A drug candidate made of 2'F-ANA to treat COPD was pursued by Topigen Pharmaceuticals and received approval to start Phase 1 clinical trials in December 2008. His group was the first to synthesize 2'F-ANA using DNA polymerases, an area that has flourished recently with the development of Xeno Nucleic Acids (XNAs) - synthetic alternative to the natural nucleic acids DNA and RNA.

Damha and his research group have also made several contributions to the synthesis of RNA and novel RNA structures. These include the synthesis of branched and lariat RNA structures as well as novel acetal levulinyl ester (ALE)-based protecting group strategies that allow RNA to be synthesized directly on glass microarrays (RNA "chips") by eliminating the need for fluoride-mediated deprotection.

== Honours and awards ==
Damha received the Chemical Institute of Canada's 2020 Raymond Lemieux and 2007 Bernard Belleau Awards for significant contributions to medicinal and organic chemistry by a Canadian chemist., the Fessenden Professorship in Science Innovation (McGill University; 2010), the David Thomson Award in Graduate Supervision and Teaching (McGill University; 2010), the Leo Yaffe Award for Excellence in Teaching (McGill University; 2011–12), and the Queen Elizabeth II Diamond Jubilee Medal (The Governor General of Canada; 2012).

Damha is a member of the Nicaraguan Academy of Science (2017–present). He has previously served as President of the International Society of Nucleosides, Nucleotides, Nucleic Acids (IS3NA) (2019-2020) and as President of the Oligonucleotide Therapeutics Society (2012-2014).
