= Herongate Square =

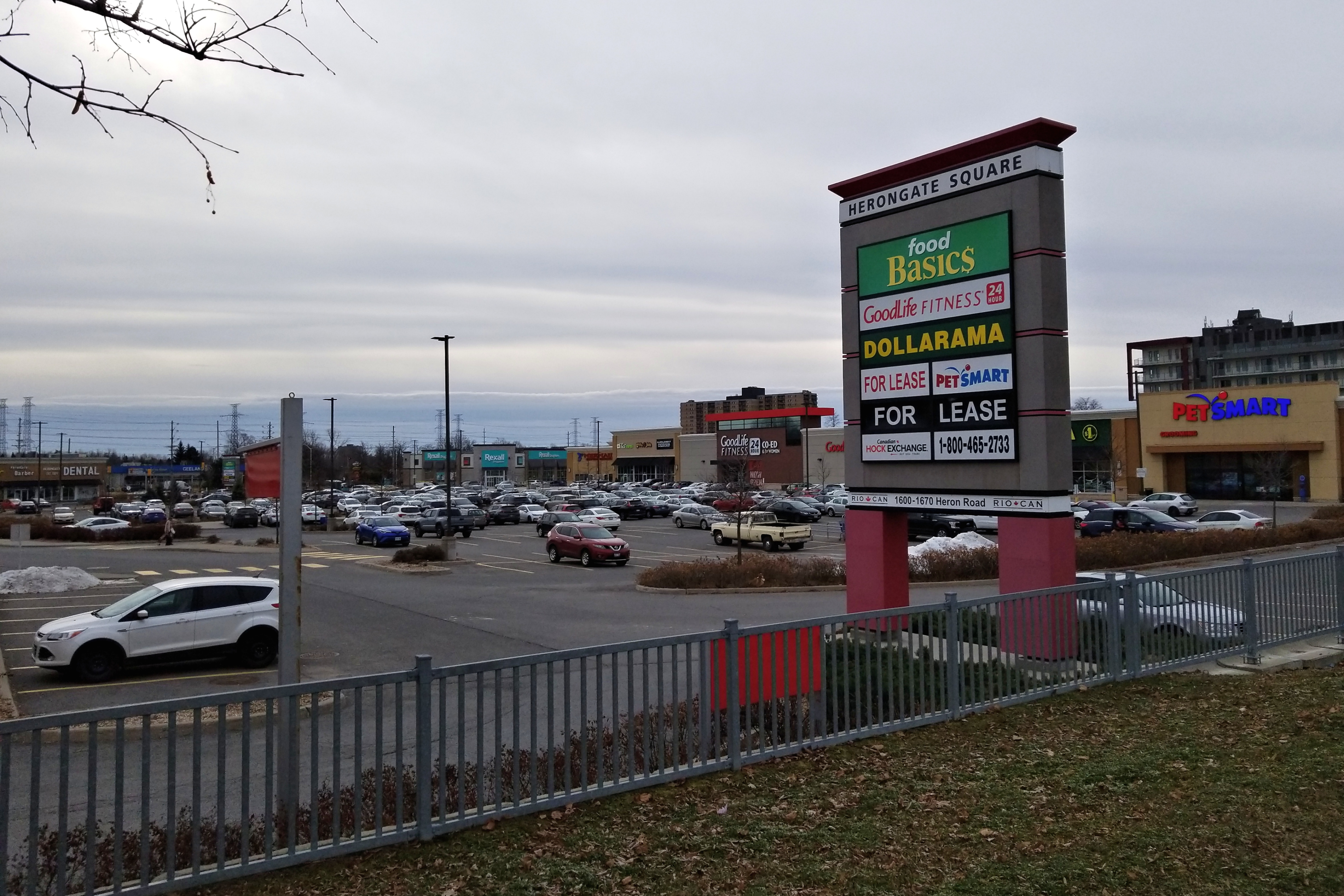
- Location: Ottawa, Ontario, Canada
- Coordinates: 45°22′44″N 75°38′40″W
- Address: 1600-1670 Heron Road
- Opened: 1981
- Manager: RioCan-REIT
- Num. of stores: 23
- Floor area: 140,256 ft^{2} (13,030.2 m^{2})

The Herongate Square is an unenclosed shopping centre in the Heron Gate neighbourhood of Ottawa, Ontario, Canada, at the intersection of Walkley Road and Heron Road. Prior to redevelopment in the mid-2010s, it was the site of the Herongate Mall, a medium-sized mall launched in 1981. It is currently owned by Trinity Financial.

== Ownership ==
- 1981 - Unknown: Marathon Realty (property development branch of Canadian Pacific Limited), then owners of Place d'Orleans and Merivale Mall.
- Unknown-2007: Oxford Properties
- 2007-2011: Transglobe Property Management
- 2011–Present: Trinity Financial

== History ==
=== 1980s: inception ===
The mall opened its doors to the public on Wednesday August 12, 1981.

It was anchored by a Dominion (A&P after 1985) supermarket at one end and a Zeller's at the other. The 195,000 square foot indoor mall hosted over 40 businesses and services including a bakery, hairdressers and clothing stores. It was surrounded by 1,100 parking spaces, for an overall area of over 16 acres.

The mall aimed to serve a market of 82,000 potential clients living in the neighbouring developments, including the Minto Heron Gate project.

In response to concerns of nearby residents the City of Ottawa conducted a traffic survey in the fall of 1981. Residents feared the new mall would increase excessively traffic on Jefferson Avenue. In 1969, residents had feared commercial development in the area would attract drag racing teenagers.

=== 1990s: growth ===
Rockin' Johnny's Diner and Zellers opened locations at Herongate Mall in the 1990s.

=== 2000s: decline ===
Many stores either closed or changed names in the 2000s. The Zellers location became a Sears Canada outlet in the early 2000s, then split between two tenants (Convergys, and an independent furniture store) during the late 2000s. The Rockin' Johnny's Diner was also converted to an independent restaurant under a different name (the South Side Bar and Grill).

Santa Claus had a location during the Christmas and holiday season, but later left the mall due to vandalisms that read "NO SANTA" on Herongate Mall's exterior walls.

=== 2010s: Convergys layoff, redevelopment ===
Convergys closed its location and vacated the building in 2011. Also in 2011, Trinity Development purchased Herongate Mall from Transglobe Property Management for $18 million. Trinity's master plan shows a total of 16 smaller buildings surrounded by parking spaces on the same Herongate footprint. The indoor mall would disappear.

In April 2012, Trinity confirmed that Food Basics would be the only store remaining of the legacy Mall. The remainder of the mall would be torn down and either be added to the parking lot or be developed into a string of smaller standalone stores.

In June 2012 a construction company started demolition, leaving only the Food Basics as the only part of the original mall. During that same month, a fire occurred in the Dollarama.

In the summer of 2013, Scotiabank closed its in-mall location and moved into a brand new standalone location on Heron Road, northwest of the mall's original footprint.

In late 2013, the demolition of the legacy mall was completed and the Food Basics had a new entrance from the west parking lot, previously where the rest of the mall stood.

As of early 2014, several standalone buildings have been occupied both by tenants who used to occupy a space in Herongate Mall and new tenants. These include Scotiabank, Subway, a barber, and Pharma Plus.

As of February 2015, Dollarama re-opened at the mall after an almost three-year hiatus.

== Controversy ==
=== Maintenance problems ===
The Ottawa Branch of Acorn Canada criticized then-Herongate Mall property owner Transglobe for letting the mall's stores deteriorate and become unsanitary.

In April 2010 CBC News published an article noting the "limbo" of Herongate Mall. Some mall tenants noted in recent years they had lost up to 30 percent of their business due to the poor maintenance of the mall. The tenants accused the landlord, Transglobe Property Management at the time the article was written, of neglecting the building's pest and rodent issues and problems with the building's plumbing.

The City of Ottawa Public Health and fire department have visited the mall on several occasions to investigate "complaints of blocked exits and water damage to ceilings during the same time period."

== Public transit ==
OC Transpo routes 44, 46, 140, 291 and 689 serve the area.
