= Visa policy of the Bahamas =

Policy on permits required to enter Bahamas

Visitors to The Bahamas must obtain an e-Visa unless they are citizens from one of the visa-exempt countries.

Entry stamp

== Visa policy map ==
Visa policy of the Bahamas The Bahamas Visa not required (8 months) Visa not required (3 months) Visa not required (90 days) if holding a valid Canadian, Schengen, UK or US visa, or a permanent residence permit issued by any Schengen Area member state or the UK; otherwise, eVisa eVisa

== Visa exemption ==
=== Ordinary passports ===
Citizens of the following countries and territories may enter the Bahamas without a visa for stays up to the duration listed below. The stay may be extended on arrival (except for citizens of Hong Kong).

8 months

- Antigua and Barbuda
- Belgium
- Canada
- Denmark
- Greece
- Iceland
- Italy
- Liechtenstein
- Luxembourg
- Norway
- San Marino
- Switzerland
- Turkey
- United Kingdom (Note: Including all types of British passports.)
- United States

90 days

- Hong Kong

3 months

- European Union member states (except Belgium, Denmark, Greece, Italy and Luxembourg)

- Andorra
- Argentina
- Armenia
- Australia
- Azerbaijan
- Bahrain
- Bangladesh
- Barbados
- Belize
- Benin
- Bolivia
- Botswana
- Brazil
- Brunei
- Cape Verde
- Chile
- China
- Colombia
- Costa Rica
- Dominica
- Ecuador
- El Salvador
- Eswatini
- Fiji
- Gambia
- Georgia
- Ghana
- Grenada
- Guatemala
- Guyana
- Honduras
- Israel
- Jamaica
- Japan
- Kenya
- Kiribati
- Kosovo
- Kuwait
- Lesotho
- Malawi
- Malaysia
- Maldives
- Mali
- Marshall Islands
- Mauritius
- Mexico
- Moldova
- Monaco
- Namibia
- Nauru
- New Zealand
- Nicaragua
- North Macedonia
- Oman
- Panama
- Papua New Guinea
- Paraguay
- Peru
- Qatar
- Rwanda
- Russia
- Saint Kitts and Nevis
- Saint Lucia
- Saint Vincent and the Grenadines
- Samoa
- Sao Tome and Principe
- Seychelles
- Sierra Leone
- Singapore
- Solomon Islands
- South Africa
- South Korea
- Sri Lanka
- Suriname
- Tanzania
- Tonga
- Trinidad and Tobago
- Tuvalu
- Uganda
- United Arab Emirates
- Uruguay
- Vanuatu
- Vatican City
- Venezuela
- Zambia
- Zimbabwe

==== Substitute visa ====
Citizens of India with a valid visa issued by any Schengen Area member state, Canada, the United Kingdom or the United States, or a permanent residence permit issued by any Schengen Area member state or the United Kingdom may enter the Bahamas without a visa for a maximum stay of 90 days.

Holders of a permanent residence permit issued by Canada or the United States may enter the Bahamas without a visa for up to 30 days.

=== Non-ordinary passports ===
In addition to countries whose citizens are visa-exempt, holders of diplomatic or official passports of Haiti, India and holders of diplomatic or official / service passports of Cuba may enter the Bahamas without a visa.

== Electronic visa (e-Visa) ==
Citizens of other countries and territories may obtain an e-Visa.

== Visitors statistics ==
Most visitors arriving in the Bahamas were from the following countries of nationality:

Country	2021	2020	2019	2018	2017	2016	2015	2014	2013
United States	835,925	354,555	1,473,543	1,304,551	1,145,072	1,182,518	1,169,250	1,129,454	1,086,719
Canada	11,744	42,945	134,501	126,444	111,039	124,922	148,522	142,002	121,983
United Kingdom	6,244	8,019	36,766	36,240	33,540	34,824	31,694	27,538	26,741
Mexico	3,709	1,494	5,755	5,547	5,827	7,669	5,915	5,662	5,293
Brazil	3,466	1,912	10,644	8,261	8,718	7,672	9,303	10,306	9,896
Jamaica	3,007	1,382	6,496	6,883	6,980	6,980	7,004	7,136	7,925
Colombia	1,807	717	2,631	2,536	2,234	3,613	3,145	3,348	4,364
South Africa	1,746	943	2,307	2,046	1,813	1,816	2,028	1,772	1,550
Germany	1,680	2,541	11,592	12,982	13,119	11,274	11,522	11,418	10,538
France	1,673	4,106	18,923	17,550	16,748	15,173	15,017	16,550	15,699
Switzerland	1,062	997	5,832	6,099	6,251	6,581	6,520	6,187	5,743
Italy	1,055	2,000	13,730	13,579	13,403	12,699	10,913	11,275	10,528
Argentina	902	991	5,046	6,602	7,398	7,474	5,611	5,519	5,830
Total	886,381	428,962	1,806,223	1,633,445	1,439,102	1,481,832	1,483,748	1,421,860	1,363,487

== See also ==
- Visa requirements for Bahamian citizens
