= Heron Gate =

- Neighbourhood
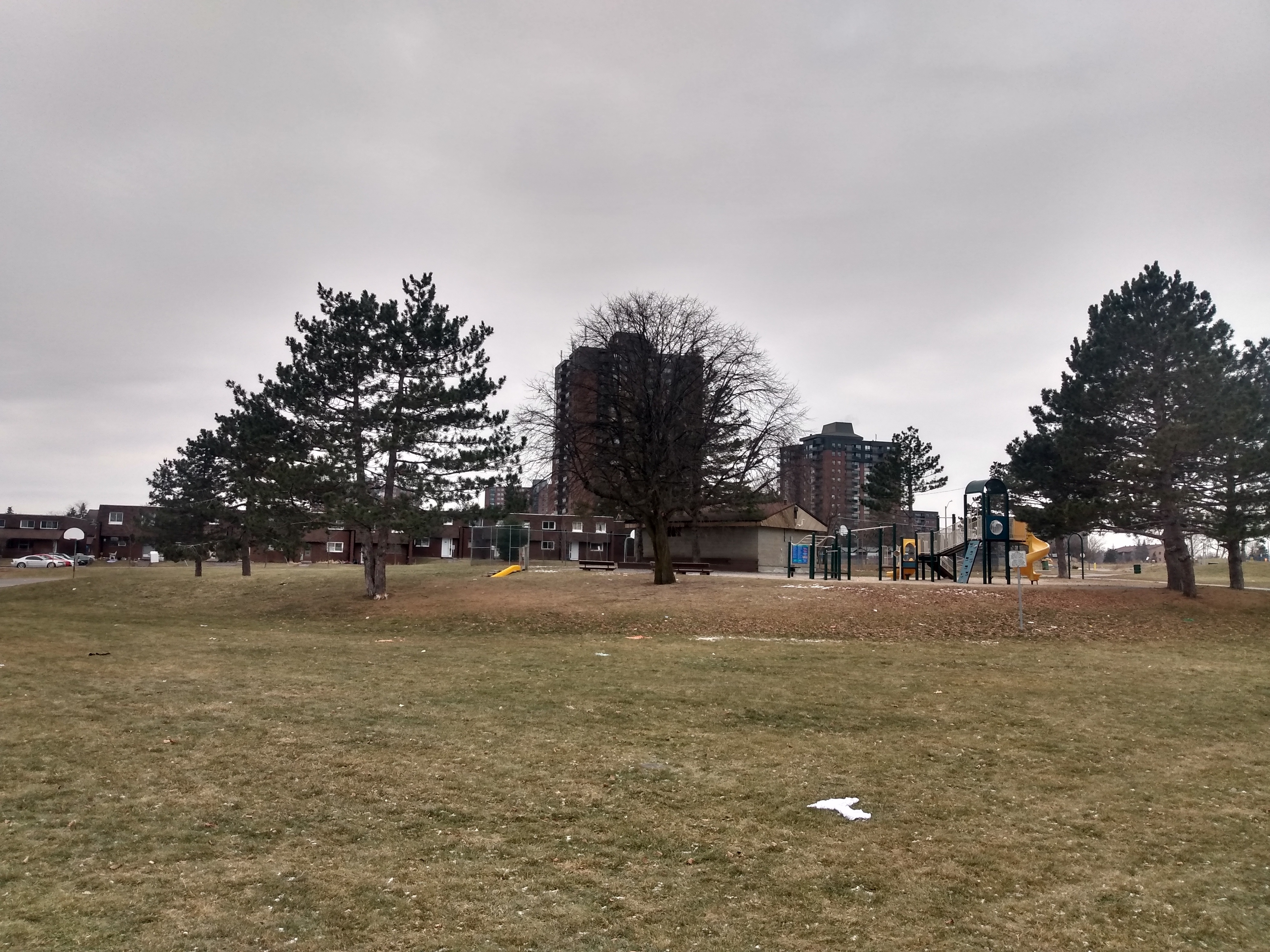
- Sandalwood Park

- Location within Ottawa
- Coordinates: 45°22′40″N 75°39′00″W
- Country: Canada
- Province: Ontario
- City: Ottawa

Government
  - MPs: David McGuinty
  - MPPs: John Fraser
  - Councillors: Marty Carr, Jessica Bradley
  - Community association: Herongate Tenant Coalition

Area
  - Total: 1.538 km^{2} (0.594 sq mi)
- Elevation: 90 m (300 ft)

Population (2021)
  - Total: 9,974
  - Density: 6,458/km^{2} (16,730/sq mi)
- Canada 2021 Census
- Time zone: UTC-5 (Eastern (EST))

Heron Gate or Herongate is a neighbourhood in Alta Vista Ward and Gloucester-Southgate Ward in the south end of Ottawa, Ontario, Canada. It is defined by the Herongate Tenant Coalition as being bounded on the north by Heron Road, on the west by Heron-Walkley Park and Albion Road, and by the Walkley rail corridor on the south. The total population for this area (excluding the Oak apartments on Albion which are in a different Census block) according to the Canada 2021 Census was 9,974.

There are several parks in the neighbourhood, and is served by Ridgemont High School), St. Patrick's High School (Ottawa), St. Patrick Intermediate and Charles Hulse Elementary School for education. The area has train tracks and the Walkley Yard to the South. It is one of the most densely populated neighbourhoods in the city. A number of new developments were completed on the west of the neighbourhood between 2006 and 2008.

== History ==
The neighbourhood north of Walkely was first built by Minto in 1966, while the neighbourhood south of Walkely was first built prior to 1976. Ottawa City Council approved the construction of 576 units on Heatherington in 1970, and 150 units at the corner of Heatherington and Albion in 1972.

== Demographics ==
The neighbourhood is extremely linguistically and racially diverse. According to the 2016 Census, a plurality of the neighbourhood (42%) is Anglophone and 13% is Francophone. Other major languages include Arabic (12%), Somali (11%), Nepali (4%), Spanish (2%), Creoles (2%) and Persian (2%). It is a plurality Black Canadian (32%), and is nearly equally White (31%). Arab Canadians also make up a significant proportion (15%). Other races include South Asian (7%), Filipino (3%), Latin American (2%), Indigenous (2%), Chinese (2%), West Asian (1%) and Southeast Asian (1%).

== Retailers ==
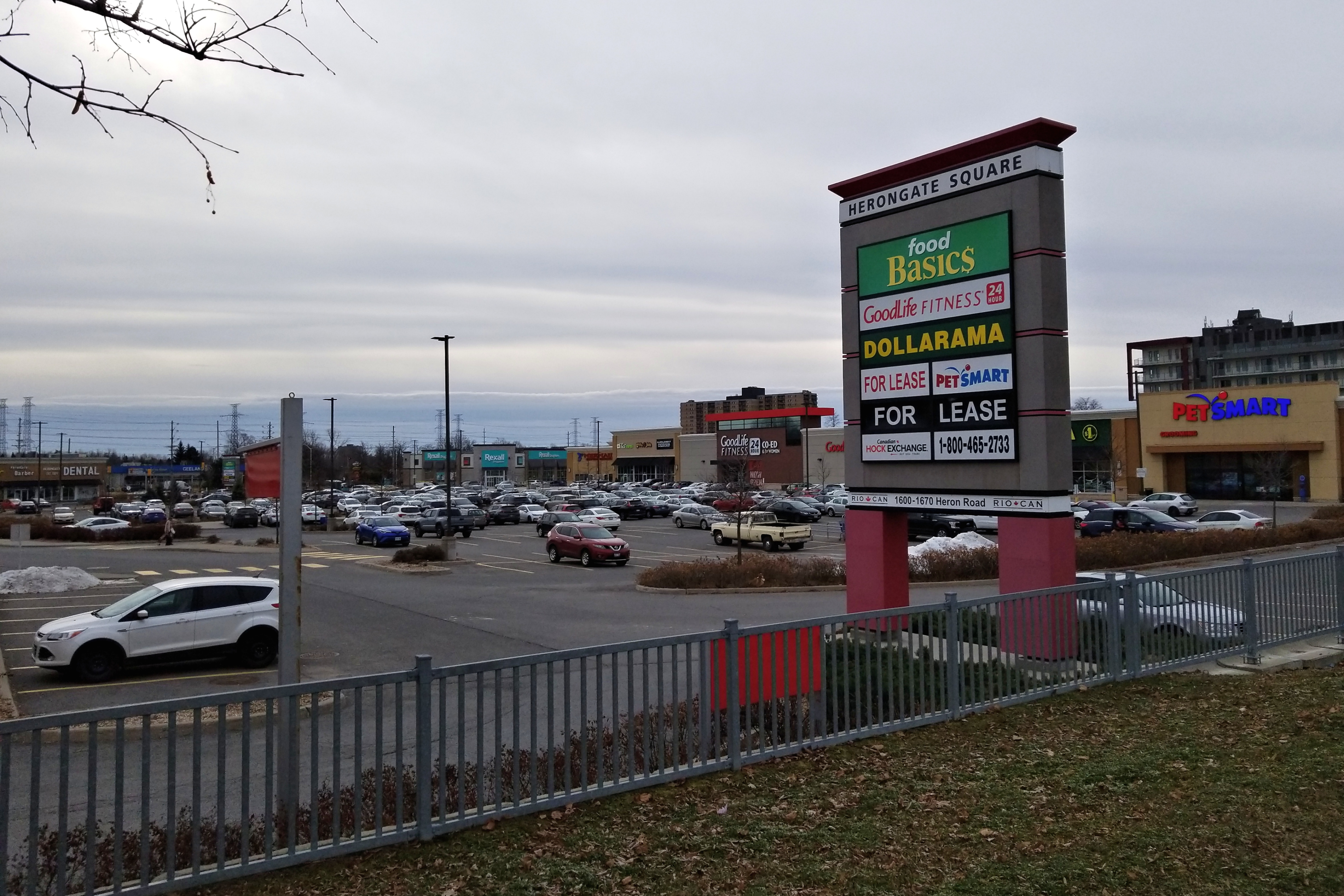
Herongate Square

The main shopping area in the Herongate area is the Herongate Square (formerly Herongate Mall). There are also stores nearby which are separate from the mall.

== Timbercreek evictions ==
Most properties south of Heron and north of Walkley, within Baycrest Drive, Sandalwood Drive and Cedarwood Drive are managed by Timbercreek Asset Management who took possession in 2012. In 2016, Timbercreek evicted residents from 80 townhomes in Heron Gate, to make room for new developments in the area. In May 2018, it announced that it would evict residents of a further 150 townhomes, due to structural problems with the buildings. The decision to redevelop the area received criticism from residents and interested parties such as the UN special rapporteur on Adequate Housing, and was described as the "'largest forced displacement in Canada' in recent history."

These evictions were criticized as being part of a broader pattern of racist “reno-victions” or “demo-victions”, as “90% of more than 500 tenants evicted in 2018 after rental properties were allowed to deteriorate were racial minorities”. Nonetheless, Heron Gate has been noted by scholars such as Emily Power, Bjarke Skærlund Risager, and Marina Gomá as an important site of working class, anti-racist activism by its residents. As Gomá notes, “The Herongate Tenant Coalition articulates a different reality to the narrative of Canadian benevolence, embodying class solidarity, denouncing structural racism, and recruiting allies to donate to their legal case against Timbercreek Management.”

Following an extended grassroots activist campaign and a human rights challenge, Timbercreek agreed to provide CAD$2,000 in moving compensation, relocation assistance and negotiated discounts with Ottawa moving companies.

== See also ==
- List of Ottawa neighbourhoods
