= Robert Ackman =

Canadian chemist and professor

Robert George Ackman
- Born: September 27, 1927; Dorchester, New Brunswick
- Died: July 16, 2013 (aged 85); Halifax, Nova Scotia
- Education: University of Toronto; Dalhousie University; University of London; Imperial College London
- Awards: Order of Canada

Robert George Ackman (September 27, 1927 – July 16, 2013) was a Canadian chemist and professor. He was best known for his pioneering work on marine oils and Omega-3 fatty acid.

Born in Dorchester, New Brunswick, his education included a B.A. degree in organic chemistry from the University of Toronto received in 1950, an M.Sc. in organic chemistry from Dalhousie University received in 1952, a Ph.D. degree in organic chemistry from the University of London received in 1956, and a D.I.C. in organic chemistry from Imperial College London.

From 1950 to 1953, he was a research assistant with the Atlantic Fisheries Experimental Station of the Fisheries Research Board of Canada. From 1956 to 1979, he was with the Halifax Laboratory, Fisheries Research Board of Canada as a research chemist, program head for marine oils, assistant director, technological consultant to chairman, group leader of marine lipids, and division chief of marine lipids. From 1979 to 1995, he was a Professor with the Technical University of Nova Scotia, Canadian Institute of Fisheries Technology, Department of Food Science and Technology. In 1995, he was appointed Professor Emeritus. He authored over 550 scientific papers.

In 2001, he was made an Officer of the Order of Canada. In 1972, he was made a Fellow of the Chemical Institute of Canada.

He died at age 85 on July 16, 2013, in Halifax, Nova Scotia.

== Research ==
Dr. Ackman was best known for his research in gas-liquid chromatography, marine oils and lipids, ocean production processes, Omega-3 fatty acids, petroleum tainting, and fish and shellfish nutrition.

He began his career focusing on research of marine oils at the Halifax Laboratories in Canada. He was best known for his pioneering work on lipid analytical chemistry, particularly in the capillary gas liquid chromatography (GLC) of fatty acids and the chemistry and biochemistry of marine lipids. He developed a number of techniques to study and analyze marine oils that are now used worldwide.

He also did a lot of research on the effect oil spills have on marine life. His laboratory developed improved methods for recovery of petroleum hydrocarbons from fish muscle tissue, examined the rate of depuration of petroleum hydrocarbons from tissues of marine species, looked at how lipid storage sites in fish muscle retain hydrocarbons and he also observed the presence of biogenic and petrogenic hydrocarbons in a wide range of marine animal tissues.

Dr. Ackman also pioneered the correlation of data on the lipid composition and the fatty acid profiles of a large number of marine animals and plants of both food and industrial interest and was actively involved with the promotion of canola oil through studies on its composition. He also helped develop methods to get omega-3 fatty acids and fish oils into capsule for use in clinical application.

He edited the definitive book on "Marine Biogenic Lipids" for the CRC Press, and was the author of over 550 scientific papers.

== High Honors and awards and achievements ==
- Fellow of the Institute of Canada in 1972
- H.P. Kaufmann Memorial Lecture Medal given by the International Society for Fat Research in 1980
- Supelco-American Oil Chemists' Society Award in 1994
- Board of Governors of the American Oil Chemists' Society
- Official Referee for fish oils of the Association of Official Analytical Chemists
- helped establish the Center for Innovative Food Technology
- helped establish the Department of Food Science and Technology at TUNS
- Officer of the Order of Canada in 2001
