= Robert L. Letsinger =

American biochemist

- Born: July 31, 1921; Bloomfield, Indiana
- Died: May 26, 2014 (aged 92)
- Education: Massachusetts Institute of Technology
- Known for: DNA Synthesis
- Scientific career
- Fields: Biochemistry
- Workplaces: Northwestern University
- Doctoral advisor: Avery Morton
- Doctoral students: Marvin H. Caruthers, Kelvin Ogilvie

Robert Lewis Letsinger (July 31, 1921 – May 26, 2014) was an American biochemist and was a professor of chemistry at Northwestern University. He was best known for his research and development of chemical synthesis of DNA.

== Life ==
Letsinger earned his B.S. in 1943 his Ph.D. in 1945, both at the Massachusetts Institute of Technology in Cambridge, Massachusetts. In 1946, he joined the department of chemistry at Northwestern University. He retired from teaching in 1991 as the emeritus Clare Hamilton Hall Professor.

== Work ==
In the 1960s, Letsinger developed methods for solid phase synthesis of oligonucleotides, including the phosphoric triester method and the phosphoramidite synthesis. He thus laid the foundations for efficient automated synthesis of gene fragments and thus the rapid development of molecular biology.

Letsingers later dealt with nanotechnology and its application in DNA diagnostics. In 2000, Letsinger was one of the founders of the biotechnology company Nanosphere Inc.

== Awards ==
- 1956 Guggenheim Fellow
- 1985 Rosenstiel Award
- 1986 Member of the National Academy of Sciences
- 1988 Fellow of the American Academy of Arts and Sciences
- 1993 Arthur C. Cope Scholar Award of the American Chemical Society

== Personal life ==
Letsinger was married to Dorothy Thompson (1922–2010) in 1943. The couple had three children.
