= Champagnie =

Champagnie is a surname. Notable people with the name include:

- Jackie Champagnie or Jackie Fabulous, American comedian and actress
- Julian Champagnie (born 2001), American basketball player
- Justin Champagnie (born 2001), American basketball player
- Lurline Champagnie (born 1935/1936), British politician

== See also ==
- Champagne (surname)
