= ACS Catalysis =

- Discipline: Chemistry, catalysis
- Language: English
- Edited by: Cathleen Crudden

Publication details
- History: 2011–present
- Publisher: American Chemical Society (United States)
- Frequency: Monthly
- Impact factor: 13.6 (2025)

Standard abbreviations
- ISO 4: ACS Catal.

Indexing
- CODEN: ACCACS
- ISSN: 2155-5435
- OCLC no.: 632390994

Links
- Journal homepage; Online access; Online archive

ACS Catalysis is a monthly peer-reviewed scientific journal established in 2011 by the American Chemical Society. The journal covers research on all aspects of heterogeneous, homogeneous, and biocatalysis. The editor-in-chief is Cathleen Crudden, who assumed the position in early 2021. The journal received the Association of American Publishers’ PROSE Award for "Best New Journal in Science, Technology & Medicine" in 2013.

== Types of content ==
The journal publishes the following types of articles: Letters, Articles, Reviews, Perspectives, and Viewpoints. Reviews, Perspectives, and Viewpoints appear mostly on invitation.

== Abstracting and indexing ==
The journal is abstracted and indexed in:

- Chemical Abstracts Service
- Current Contents/Physical, Chemical & Earth Sciences
- Ei Compendex
- Science Citation Index Expanded
- Scopus

According to the Journal Citation Reports, the journal has a 2025 impact factor of 13.6.
