= Donald F. Weaver =

Canadian chemist and neurologist

Donald F. Weaver is a Canadian chemist and neurologist based at the Krembil Research Institute, University Health Network, University of Toronto, Canada. He is Senior Scientist of the Krembil Research Institute and Professor of Neurology, Chemistry, and Pharmaceutical Sciences, University of Toronto. He is a Fellow of the Royal College of Physicians (Canada), Fellow of the Chemical Institute of Canada, and Fellow of the Canadian Academy of Health Sciences.

Weaver specializes in memory and seizure disorders; his clinical practice included research in both basic and translational science as well as the presidency of Epilepsy Canada, the directorship of the Krembil Research Institute & the Krembil Brain Institute as well as appointments as Tier 1 Canada Research Chairs. He is known for his research into the biomolecular mechanisms of neurodegenerative diseases with a current focus on innate immunity and re-conceptualizing Alzheimer's disease (AD) as a disorder of autoimmunity. His contributions also include the design and synthesis of new chemical entities as putative therapeutics for AD and related dementias.

He has also co-founded Neurochem Inc. and Treventis Corp., both focused on developing drugs for Alzheimer's disease (AD). Neurochem proceeded to an initial public offering (IPO) on the TSX and NASDAQ and advanced two compounds to Phase III human trials. Treventis, similarly arose from Weaver's academic laboratory, and has developed small molecule therapeutics targeting tau in AD and has established collaboration with Takeda Inc. for their continued development.

== Biography ==
Weaver was born in North Bay, Ontario. He completed his MD at Queen's University, followed by an internal medicine internship at the Hôtel-Dieu and Kingston General Hospitals. He next completed clinical residency training in Neurology at the Queen Elizabeth II Health Sciences Centre, Dalhousie University; where he also undertook additional training in behavioural neurology. He returned to Queen's University obtaining a Ph.D. in theoretical and organic chemistry, defending a dissertation on the applications of quantum mechanics and synthetic organic chemistry to neurologic drug design.

In his first academic appointment, he taught chemistry and neurology at Queen's University. While at Queen's, he established the first memory disorders clinic at that institution and was Professor and Head of the Division of Neurology from 1998 to 2001. He subsequently moved to Dalhousie University as a Tier 1 Canada Research Chair in Neurodegenerative Diseases. While there he also became the inaugural Sobey Endowed Chair in Curative Approaches to Alzheimer's Disease. He next relocated to Toronto as a Tier 1 Canada Research Chair in Protein Misfolding and as the inaugural Director of the Krembil Research Institute.

He has been studying Alzheimer's disease using theoretical/computational chemistry methods for more than 30 years. He was the computational chemist whose in silico screen identified analogues of taurine as potential disease modifying agents for AD; this led to the development of tramiprosate, which reached Phase III human trials for AD, and to eprodisate for the treatment of renal amyloidosis.

Weaver's peer-reviewed publications number over 400 - spanning clinical and basic science (theoretical and synthetic chemistry). He has 48 issued patents. He has also published poetry and short stories in the area of dementia.

== Awards and honours ==
- S. Weir Mitchell Award, American Academy of Neurology (1991)
- Alzheimer's Disease Centennial Award, American Health Assistance Foundation (2007)
- Prix Galien Research Award Canada (2009)
- Killam Research Fellowship Award, Arts Council of Canada (2010)
- Jonas Salk Award, March of Dimes of Canada (2011)
- Heinz Lehmann Award, Canadian College of Neuropsychopharmacology (2011)
- Harrington Innovator-Scholar Award (2020)
- Oskar Fischer Prize in Alzheimer's Research (2022)
