= Cathleen Crudden =

Canadian chemist

- Citizenship: Canadian
- Education: University of Toronto University of Ottawa Osaka University
- Known for: N-Heterocyclic Carbenes Catalysis Materials Chemistry; Organometallic chemistry Hydroboration
- Scientific career
- Fields: Chemistry
- Workplaces: Queen's University Nagoya University (ITbM); University of New Brunswick University of Illinois at Urbana-Champaign
- Doctoral advisor: Howard Alper
- Other academic advisors: Mark Lautens Scott E. Denmark Shinji Murai
- Website: https://www.cruddengroup.com/ https://www.carbon-2-metal-institute.queensu.ca/

Cathleen M. Crudden is a Canadian chemist. She is a Canada Research Chair in Metal Organic Chemistry at Queen's University at Kingston, as well as an Allie Vi Distinguished University Professor in the Department of Chemistry at Queen's University at Kingston and a research professor at the Institute of Transformative Bio-Molecules (ITbM) at Nagoya University in Japan. She is the scientific director of the Carbon to Metal Coating Institute (C2MCI) at Queen's University.

Crudden is a world class scientist whose research on the use of organic coatings to modify metal surfaces has garnered international recognition. Specifically, her work related to developing organic ligands for metal surfaces has been transformative not only in her field of chemistry, but also in physics and materials science, with potential applications in biology and medicine.

Crudden's research interests lie in persistent carbenes, materials chemistry, hydroboration, organometallic chemistry, and chirality. She is known for her leading work on the formation of monolayers on gold surfaces and clusters with N-heterocyclic carbenes and for ground-breaking work in palladium-catalyzed cross coupling reactions with enantioenriched organoboranes.

In February 2021, Crudden took up the role of editor-in-chief at ACS Catalysis, the leading general catalysis journal world-wide. She has also served as founder and Chair of the Natural Sciences and Engineering Research Council Chemistry Liaison Committee, Chair of the Chemical Institute of Canada and president of the Chemical Society of Canada.

As a result of her research excellence, she is a Fellow of the Royal Society of Canada, an elected international member of the American Academy of Arts and Sciences, a Fellow of the Chemical Institute of Canada, Fellow of the American Chemical Society, and a Fellow of the Royal Society of Chemistry (UK). As a highly sought-after mentor, she has supervised over 200 students. In June 2023, the Canadian Journal of Chemistry dedicated a special issue to Crudden in honour of her scientific achievements, featuring research conducted by students she has mentored.

== Education ==
Crudden earned a Bachelor of Science at the University of Toronto in 1989, working with Mark Lautens, with whom she went on to complete her master's degree. She moved to the University of Ottawa for her PhD, working under the supervision of Howard Alper, which she completed in 1995. During this time, she completed a research exchange with Shinji Murai at Osaka University in Japan.

== Research and career ==
After completing her Ph.D., Crudden was awarded a Natural Sciences and Engineering Research Council postdoctoral fellowship at the University of Illinois at Urbana–Champaign working with Scott E. Denmark in 1995. She moved to University of New Brunswick (UNB) in 1996 as an assistant professor and was granted early promotion and tenure in 2000. In 2001, she became one of the first cohorts of University Research Professors at UNB. In 2002, she was recruited to Queen's University as a Queen's National Scholar and moved her research lab to Kingston, Ontario.

Crudden's early significant contribution was her identification of an enantiospecific Suzuki-Miyaura cross-coupling reaction of chiral boranes. Cross-coupling reactions are essential tools for the manufacturing of many pharmaceutical molecules, and Crudden was the first to demonstrate that it is possible to carry out this type of reaction in an enantiospecific manner by controlling chirality, a key property of most biologically active molecules.

In 2014, Crudden designed highly stable carbon-based self-assembled monolayers for metal surfaces based on N-heterocyclic carbenes. Crudden's research proved that small carbon-based molecules, called N-heterocyclic carbene (NHC) molecules, could bind to metals to form exceptionally stable organic films resistant to oxidation, solvents, and extreme temperatures.

In 2010, Crudden secured a Natural Sciences and Engineering Research Council CREATE award in chiral materials worth $1.6 million. From June 2012-May 2013, Crudden served as president of the Canadian Society for Chemistry, and she was Chair of the Chemical Institute of Canada from 2020 to 2021.

From December 2012 onwards, Crudden has worked as a research professor at the Institute of Transformative Bio-Molecules, based out of Nagoya University in Japan, where she oversees a satellite lab. She is one of only a few international faculty members at the institute.

In 2015, as principal investigator of a group of ten collaborators, Crudden was awarded $8.8 million from the Canada Foundation for Innovation for major infrastructure purchases. She won the Queen's University Research Opportunities Fund, which she used to create inexpensive, sensitive biosensors.

In 2016, Crudden and the late Dr. Suning Wang held a trilateral Canada-Japan-Germany symposium at Queen's University titled Elements Functions for Transformative Catalysis and Materials, where researchers presented their latest discoveries related to catalysis and materials chemistry based on main-group elements.

In 2017, Crudden was recognized as a Canada Research Chair (Tier 1) in Metal Organic Chemistry, securing Queen's University $200,000 in research funding annually for seven years. Crudden's status as a Canada Research Chair was renewed for an additional seven-year term spanning 2023–2031, the maximum allowable term permitted.

In 2018, Crudden was recognized as having made the most distinguished contribution to the field of catalysis by the Chemical Institute of Canada and was awarded the Catalysis Award.

In May 2022, Crudden received $24M in support from Canada's New Frontiers in Research Fund and founded the Carbon to Metal Coating Institute (C2MCI), an interdisciplinary, international research institute dedicated to developing cutting edge solutions to prevent the corrosion of metals and enable their manipulation and stabilization on macro, micro, and nano length scales.

In November 2025, Crudden was named the ambassador in Chemical Sciences of the Centre national de la recherche scientifique (CNRS) and embarked on a series of lecture tours across several laboratories in France.

== Publications ==
Crudden has been featured as an author on over 170 publications. Her most cited articles are as follows:

- Crudden, Cathleen M.; Allen, Daryl P. (2004). "Stability and reactivity of N-heterocyclic carbene complexes." Coordination Chemistry Reviews. 248 (21–24): 2247–2273. doi:10.1016/j.ccr.2004.05.013. ISSN 0010-8545.
- Smith, Christene A.; Narouz, Mina R.; Lummis, Paul A.; Singh, Ishwar; Nazemi, Ali; Li, Chien-Hung; Crudden, Cathleen M. (2019). "N-Heterocyclic Carbenes in Materials Chemistry." Chemical Reviews. 119 (8): 4986–5056. doi:10.1021/acs.chemrev.8b00514. PMID 30938514.
- Crudden, Cathleen M.; Sateesh, Mutyala; Lewis, Roxanne. (2005). "Mercaptopropyl-modified mesoporous silica: A remarkable support for the preparation of a reusable, heterogeneous palladium catalyst for coupling reactions." Journal of the American Chemical Society. 127 (28): 10045–10050. doi:10.1021/ja0430954.
- Crudden, Cathleen M.; Horton, J. H.; Ebralidze, Iraklii I.; Zenkina, Olena V.; McLean, Alastair B.; Drevniok, Benedict; She, Zhe; Kraatz, Heinz-Bernhard; Mosey, Nicholas J.; Seki, Tomohiro; Keske, Eric C.; Leake, Joanna D.; Rousina-Webb, Alexander; Wu, Gang. (2014). "Ultra stable self-assembled monolayers of N-heterocyclic carbenes on gold." Nature Chemistry. 6 (5): 409–414. doi:10.1038/nchem.1891. PMID: 24755592.
- Narouz, Mina R.; Osten, Kimberly M.; Unsworth, Phillip J.; Man, Renee W.Y.; Salorinne, Kirsi; Takano, Shinjiro; Tomihara, Ryohei; Kaappa, Sami; Malola, Sami; Dinh, Cao-Thang; Padmos, J. D.; Ayoo, Kennedy; Garrett, Patrick J.; Nambo, Masakazu; Horton, J. H.; Sargent, Edward H.; Häkkinen, Hannu; Tsukuda, Tatsuya; Crudden, Cathleen M. (2019). "N-heterocyclic carbene-functionalized magic-number gold nanoclusters." Nature Chemistry. 11: 419–425. doi:10.1038/s41557-019-0246-5. PMID: 30988416.

== In the media ==
Crudden makes regular appearances across various media outlets as an expert in the field of organic chemistry, catalysis and materials science. Her commentary frequently concerns new developments in chemistry.

In July 2023, Crudden's achievements were celebrated in a special issue of the Canadian Journal of Chemistry. Featuring an introduction focusing on Crudden's influence on science and her trainees, the journal issue included contributions from colleagues, former students, postdoctoral fellows, and mentees who had been directly inspired by her work and leadership. The collection of papers covered a broad range of research related to Crudden's career, including organic synthesis, catalysis, materials design, and applications.

Crudden and her research group have an active social media presence, maintaining accounts on LinkedIn and Bluesky.

== Awards ==
- 2025 Shortlist for Falling Walls Science Breakthrough of the Year in Physical Sciences
- 2023 NSERC John C. Polanyi Award
- 2023 International Honorary Member of the American Academy of Arts and Sciences
- 2023 University of Ottawa Alumni Award of Excellence
- 2022 Alfred Bader Award
- 2021 Allie Vi Douglas Distinguished Research Professor
- 2020 Fellow of the Royal Society of Canada
- 2019 Montreal Medal
- 2019 American Chemical Society Arthur C. Cope Scholar Award
- 2018 Queen's University prize for Excellence in Research
- 2018 Chemical Institute of Canada Catalysis Award
- 2018 Precious Metal Institute Carol Tyler Award
- 2017 Canadian Society for Chemistry R.U. Lemieux Award
