= Frances Champagne =

Psychologist

Frances A. Champagne
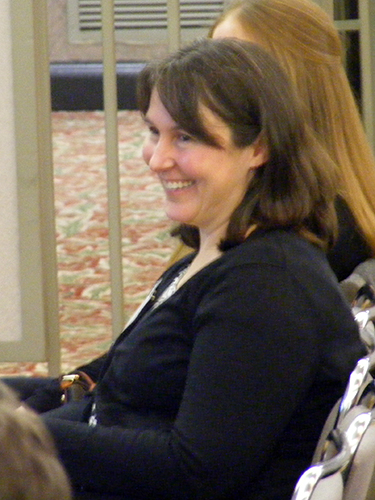
- Education: Queen's University (BA) McGill University (MSc) (PhD) University of Cambridge
- Occupations: Professor, Psychology, University of Texas at Austin
- Awards: NIH Director's New Innovator Award
- Website: https://labs.la.utexas.edu/champagne/

Frances A. Champagne is a Canadian psychologist and University Professor of Psychology at the University of Texas at Austin known for her research in the fields of molecular neuroscience, maternal behavior, and epigenetics. Research in the Champagne lab explores the developmental plasticity that occurs in response to environmental experiences. She is known for her work on the epigenetic transmission of maternal behavior. Frances Champagne's research has revealed how natural variations in maternal behavior can shape the behavioral development of offspring through epigenetic changes in gene expression in a brain region specific manner. She won the NIH Director's New Innovator Award in 2007 and the Frank A. Beach Young Investigator Award in Behavioral Neuroendocrinology in 2009. She has been described as the "bee's knees of neuroscience". She serves on the Committee on Fostering Healthy Mental, Emotional, and Behavioral Development Among Children and Youth in the United States.

== Education and teaching ==
Champagne received her B.A. degree in psychology at Queen's University, Canada. She attended graduate school at McGill University, Canada where she obtained both her M.Sc degree in Psychiatry and a PhD degree in Neuroscience where she studied under the mentorship of Michael Meaney. Champagne completed her postdoctoral research at the University of Cambridge in England, where she studied animal behavior. Champagne was hired as an assistant professor in the Department of Psychology at Columbia University in New York City in 2006. Upon tenure-review, she was promoted to Associate Profession, a position she remained until 2017. From 2016 to 2017, Dr. Champagne also served as the Vice Chair in the Department of Psychology. In 2017, she began her current tenure at University of Texas at Austin as a full professor in the Department of Psychology. She maintains her affiliation with Columbia University as an adjunct associate professor within the department of psychology. As a full professor, she teaches courses including but not limited to the developing brain, behavioral epigenetics and ethics, genetics and the brain.

== Research ==
Champagne's research has examined the neurobiology of the parental brain including neural mechanisms underlying individual differences in maternal behavior and the effects of the environment on these neural circuits. Another main research interest is the epigenetic effects of maternal behavior and how epigenetic variation emerge in response to variation in mother-infant interactions experienced during development. She also researches prenatal programming of offspring development and the impact of prenatal exposure to stress, toxins, or nutritional variation on placental and offspring brain gene expression. Paternal-maternal interplay and offspring development is another research main interest of Champagne and is the impact of fathers on mothers and offspring and the epigenetic mechanisms through which this interplay occurs. In addition, she is interested in exploring ways to ameliorate the negative effects of adverse prenatal and postnatal experiences on development by investigating the epigenetic mechanisms that allow offspring to overcome or be resilient to such early life experiences.

Champagne has investigated the epigenetic mechanisms via which individual variation in reproductive and social behavior can be induced via variation in early (prenatal and postnatal) life experiences. She has explored the interplay between mothers and fathers in the development of offspring and transgenerational effects of early life experiences.

In her new Epigenetics, Development & Neuroscience Lab, she and her lab members explore the changes that can occur throughout development as a result of environmental conditions. Most notably, the effect of prenatal exposure to bisphenols on mother and infant epigenetic and behavioral outcomes. This work is funded through the National Institute on Environmental Health Sciences. Bisphenols, including but not limited to Bisphenol A, otherwise known as BPA have previously been shown to be endocrine disrupting.

Additionally, she is a co-investigator continuing the Boricua Youth Study that began at Columbia University, a longitudinal study aimed at understanding the risks and protective factors that Puerto Rican youth experience. This project is funded through the National Institute on Child Health Development.

Lastly and most recently, she served on the committee for the Parental Brain Conference in 2018, a meeting focused on the biological and behavioral perspectives in parental health during the summer of 2018.

== Selected publications ==
Jensen Peña C, Champagne FA (2015) Neonatal over-expression of estrogen receptor-α alters midbrain dopamine neuron development and reverses the effects of low maternal care in female offspring. Developmental Neurobiology 75(10):1114-24. PMID 25044746

Kundakovic M, Gudsnuk K, Herbstman JB, Tang D, Perera FP, Champagne FA (2015) DNA methylation of BDNF as a biomarker of early-life adversity. Proc Natl Acad Sci U S A 12(22):6807-13. PMID 25385582

Champagne FA, Weaver IC, Diorio J, Sharma S, Meaney MJ (2003) Natural variations in maternal care are associated with estrogen receptor alpha expression and estrogen sensitivity in the medial preoptic area. Endocrinology 144(11):4720-4. PMID 12959970

Champagne F, Francis DD., Mar A, Meaney MJ (2003) Naturally-occurring variations in maternal care in the rat as a mediating influence for the effects of environment on the development of individual differences in stress reactivity. Physiology & Behavior 79:359-371. PMID 12954431

Champagne F, Diorio J, Sharma S, Meaney MJ (2001) Naturally occurring variations in maternal behavior in the rat are associated with differences in estrogen-inducible central oxytocin receptors. Proceedings of the National Academy of Sciences USA 98(22):12736-41. PMID 11606726

== Awards ==
- 2012-2013 Lenfest Distinguished Faculty Award in Psychology, Columbia University in the City of New York.
- 2009 Frank A. Beach Young Investigator Award in Behavioral Neuroendocrinology. Hormones and Behavior, 2011, 60, 4-11.
- 2007 NIH Director's New Innovator Awards. Project Title: Epigenetic Mechanism Mediating the Inheritance of Reproductive Behavior. Grant ID: DP2-OD001674
