= Chemical Institute of Canada =

Professional organization for chemists in Canada

- Formation: 1921; 105 years ago
- Type: Scientific society
- Headquarters: Ottawa
- Location: Canada
- Members: almost 6,000
- Website: cheminst.ca

The Chemical Institute of Canada is a Canadian professional umbrella organization for researchers and professionals in the fields of chemistry and chemical engineering. It was founded in 1921 as the Canadian Institute of Chemistry until it merged with other groups in 1945 under its current name. The organization is currently composed of two groups: the Canadian Society for Chemical Engineering (est. 1966) and the Canadian Society for Chemistry (est. 1985). The Canadian Society for Chemical Technology (est. 1973) was formerly a third subsidiary organization, but a structural reorganization of the CIC in 2022 renamed this group as the Technologists & Technicians subject division of the Canadian Society for Chemistry. Through its two member existent groups, the CIC is associated with two scientific journals: the Canadian Journal of Chemical Engineering and the Canadian Journal of Chemistry.

Its highest award is the Chemical Institute of Canada Medal, awarded annually since 1951.

As of 2012, the Chemical Institute of Canada formed an agreement with the Society of Chemical Industry and SCI Canada, whereby SCI Canada became a forum of the CIC.

== Canadian Chemistry Conference and Exhibition ==
Every year, the Chemical Institute of Canada holds a conference to bring together researchers and professional from all over Canada. The first conference in 1918 is said to have consisted of only 100 people and lead to the formation of the Chemical Society of Canada. In 2017, the 100th conference was held in Toronto coinciding with the 150th anniversary of Canada.

== Fellows ==
The Chemical Institute of Canada awards fellowships (post-nominal FCIC) and honorary fellowships (post-nominal HFCIC). Some Fellows and Honorary Fellows include:

- Robert Ackman, FCIC
- Tom Baker, FCIC
- Alfred Bader, HFCIC
- Russell J. Boyd, FCIC
- Pascale Champagne, FCIC
- Howard Charles Clark, FCIC
- Masad Damha, FCIC
- Pierre Deslongchamps, FCIC
- Suzanne Fortier, FCIC
- Jack Halpern, FCIC
- Mark Lautens, FCIC
- Jennifer Love, FCIC
- Stephanie Macquarrie, FCIC
- John Charles Polanyi, HFCIC
- Tito Scaiano, FCIC
- William George Schneider, FCIC
- Victor Snieckus, FCIC
- Donald F. Weaver, FCIC
