= Pierre Deslongchamps =

Canadian chemist

Pierre Deslongchamps OC FRS (born 1938 in Saint-Lin-Laurentides, Quebec) is a Canadian chemist, and professor at Université de Sherbrooke. He was a 1979 Guggenheim Fellow.

== Life ==
He graduated from the Université de Montreal with a BSc in 1959 and from University of New Brunswick with a PhD in 1964. He studied at Harvard University with Robert Burns Woodward.

He is the Executive Scientific Advisor at OmegaChem.
