= Pascale Champagne =

Canadian chemical and environmental engineer

Pascale Champagne is a Canadian chemical and environmental engineer whose research focuses on the management of biological resources including biofuel production and water treatment. She is Director General of the Clean Energy Innovation Research Centre of the National Research Council Canada.

== Education and career ==
Champagne has two bachelor's degrees: one in biology from McGill University in 1990, and a second one in water resources engineering from the University of Guelph in 1993. She did her graduate studies in environmental engineering at Carleton University, where she received a master's degree in 1996 and completed her Ph.D. in 2001.

After consulting work as an environmental engineer, Champagne took a faculty position at Carleton University, and then at Queen's University at Kingston, where she worked from 2005 to 2021, held a tier 2 Canada Research Chair in Bioresources Engineering, and directed the Beaty Water Research Centre from 2017 to 2020. She became a scientific director at the Institut national de la recherche scientifique in Quebec, in September 2020, before becoming Director General of the Energy, Mining and Environment Research Centre of the National Research Council Canada in 2021.

== Recognition ==
Champagne was part of an interdisciplinary group of four Queen's University professors who received the 2019 Brockhouse Prize of NSERC for their research on sustainability. She received the Engineering Medal in Research and Development at the 2021 Ontario Professional Engineers Awards.

She was named as a Fellow of the Canadian Academy of Engineering in 2019, as a Fellow of the Chemical Institute of Canada in 2022, and as a Fellow of the Engineering Institute of Canada in 2023.
