= Toronto Western Hospital =

Hospital in Toronto, Ontario, Canada

Coordinates: 43.653598°N 79.405505°W

- University Health Network

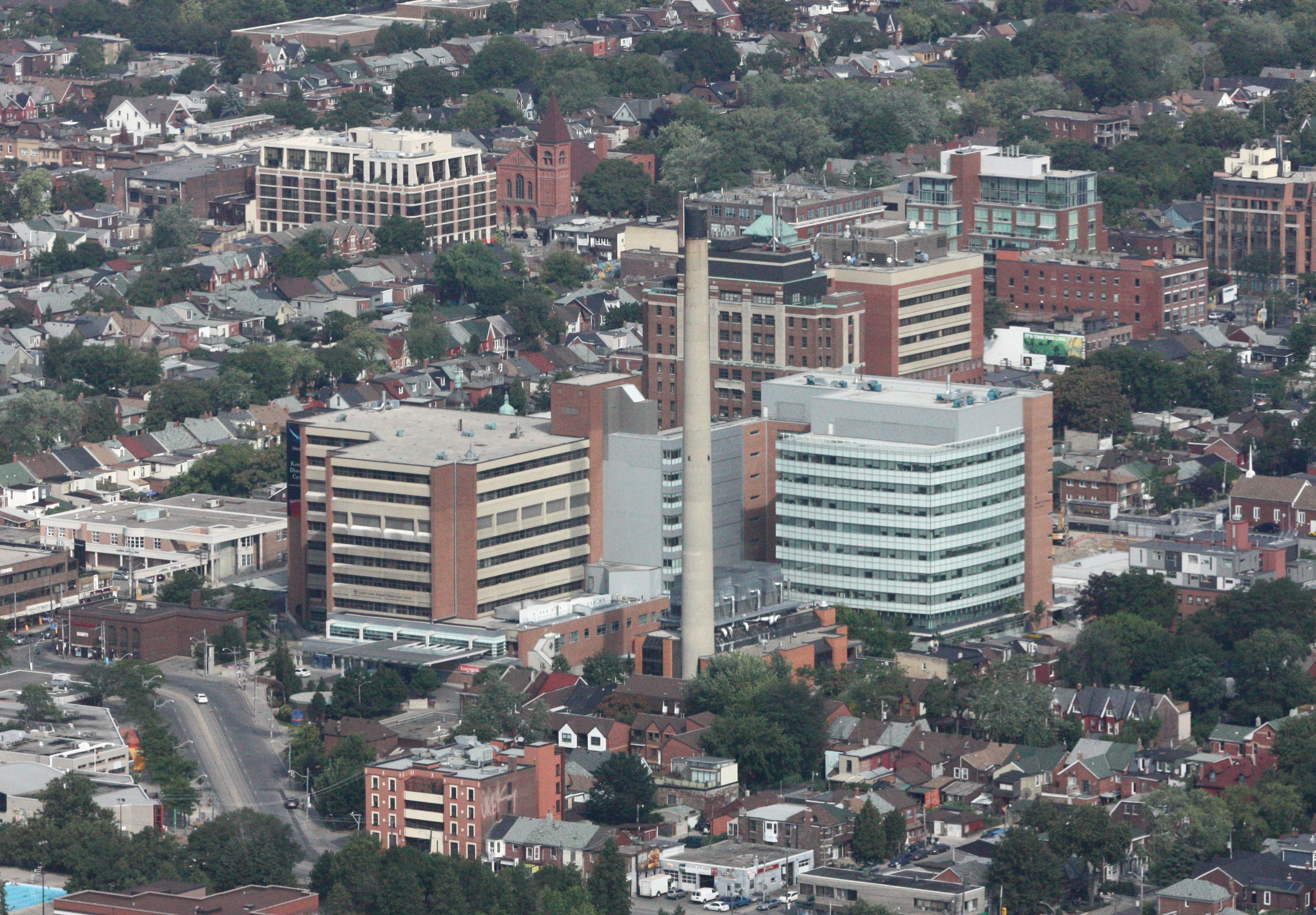
- Toronto Western Hospital as viewed from the CN Tower

Geography
- Location: 399 Bathurst Street; Toronto, Ontario; M5T 2S8

Organisation
- Care system: Medicare
- Type: Teaching
- Affiliated university: University of Toronto

Services
- Emergency department: Yes
- Beds: 256
- Speciality: Neuroscience, musculoskeletal health and arthritis, vision science, population health

History
- Founded: 1895

Links
- Website: www.uhn.ca/corporate/AboutUHN/OurHospitals/TWH/

The Toronto Western Hospital (TWH) is a major research and teaching hospital in Toronto, Ontario, Canada. It is part of the University Health Network (UHN). It has 256 beds, with 46,000 visits to its emergency department annually. It is known for neurosurgery and was one of the first centres in Canada to use the gamma knife. It is also home to the Donald K. Johnson Eye Centre and the Krembil Discovery Tower where the Krembil Research Institute is based.

== History ==
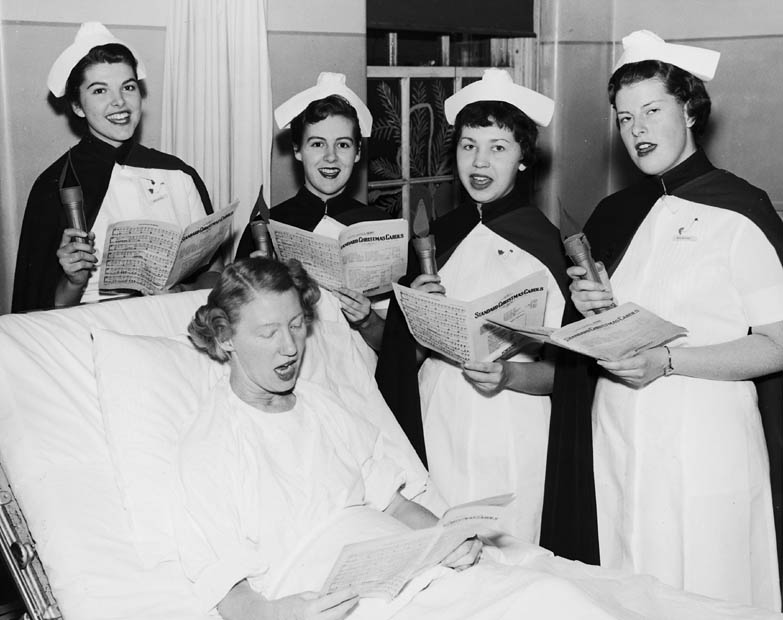
Nurses at the Toronto Western Hospital gathered around a patient in 1955

In 1895, doctors serving what was then the west end of Toronto united in hopes of building a full hospital facility to serve this overlooked locale. Twelve doctors signed a pledge to fulfill their vision and soon after, the Toronto Western Hospital was born.

The Toronto Western Hospital opened first as a public dispensary, followed by a 30-bed hospital operating out of two rented houses on Manning Avenue. With the support of several influential citizens, enough money was raised by 1899 to acquire a nearby farmhouse property and to build the Western on its present site at the corner of Bathurst and Dundas Streets. During construction, patients were treated under large tents until the hospital opened year-round in 1905.

The 1906 North Wing, 1910 South Wing and 1911/1923 additions were designed by E. J. Lennox but since demolished.

The main wing or McLaughlin Pavilion was built in 1935 by Govan Ferguson Lindsay Kaminker Langley Keenleyside and renovated in 2003 by Dunlop-Farrow Architects and Murray Hilgers Architects.

Like the Toronto General Hospital, Toronto Western Hospital saw several renovations over the years and today occupies a full city block. The East Wing was built in 2005.

In 2022, the Government of Ontario announced that Toronto Western will be expanded to include a new patient care tower that will increase capacity for inpatients, operating rooms, and other units. The expansion is projected to increase neurosurgical procedures by 10% over the next ten years. The new 15-story tower is scheduled to be completed in 2028.

== Royal patronage ==
The hospital has a royal patron, Sophie, Duchess of Edinburgh.
