= Timbercreek Asset Management =

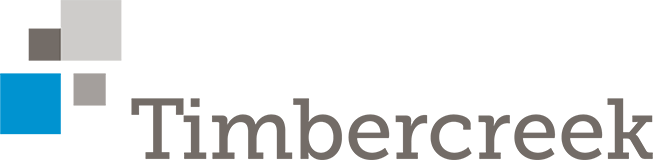
- Type: Private
- Industry: Real Estate
- Founded: 1999
- Founder: Blair Tamblyn; Ugo Bizzarri
- Headquarters: Toronto, Ontario, Canada
- Key people: Blair Tamblyn (Chief executive officer)
- Website: http://www.timbercreek.com/

Timbercreek Asset Management is a Canadian real estate company based in Toronto, Ontario. It has $7.5 billion in assets under management, through a number of affiliates, including one listed on the Toronto Stock Exchange. As of August 2016, it owned 200 multi-residential properties worth $3.5 billion, making it the fifth-largest landlord in Canada.

== History ==
Timbercreek Asset Management was founded in 1999 by Blair Tamblyn and Ugo Bizzarri. Bizzarri had previously worked in the real estate group of the Ontario Teachers' Pension Plan.

In 2007, Timbercreek started its first multi-residential investment fund, raising money from institutional investors. The fund eventually had a 20% internal rate of return. It created another three funds in the following years; its third fund raised $100 million, while its fourth fund raised $200 million.

In 2011, Timbercreek sold Timbercreek REIT, consisting of 5,112 apartment units, for $182 million, to a group of private equity investors led by Greystone Managed Investments. Timbercreek continued to manage the units. In 2012, it bought 26 properties from Transglobe REIT, as part of that company's acquisition by Starlight Investments.

In 2017, Timbercreek purchased six Calgary apartment buildings for $142 million.

In 2020, Timbercreek separated its debt and equities businesses, rebranding their equities business as Hazelview Investments.

== Business ==
Timbercreek specializes in buying, renovating, and managing multi-residential properties, both directly and on behalf of institutional investors. The general Timbercreek strategy is to buy old, dilapidated buildings. renovate them, and then increase the rent. The company manages its properties through its property-management arm, Timbercreek Communities. As of 2017, the company owned 21,000 units across Canada.

== Controversy ==
Timbercreek has been involved in a number of controversies in its role as landlord.

In 2016, Timbercreek evicted tenants from 80 units in Ottawa's Heron Gate neighbourhood, in order to re-develop the property. In May 2018, it announced that it would evict residents of a further 150 townhomes, due to structural problems with the buildings. This decision received substantial criticism from tenants and others, including the UN special rapporteur on the right to adequate housing.

In 2014, there were protests over living conditions at one of the company North York buildings. There have also been a number of other published complaints by tenants.

== Timbercreek Financial ==
Timbercreek Financial is a publicly traded affiliate of Timbercreek AM, listed on the Toronto Stock Exchange. It invests in mortgages for commercial borrowers, primarily for multi-residential properties. It is Canada's largest mortgage investment corporation, and manages over $1 billion in mortgages.

== Hazelview Investments ==
In 2020, the debt and equities businesses within Timbercreek were separated with the debt business remaining under Timbercreek and the equities business spinning off to a new company name Hazelview Investments. Ugo Bizzarri assumed the role of President and CEO of Hazelview, while Blair Tamblyn, would continue to control Timbercreek as president and CEO.

Timbercreek's property management service now falls under the new Hazelview brand as Hazelview Properties Services Inc.

Following the separation, there are no longer any affiliations between Timbercreek and Hazelview businesses.
