= Bahamian nationality law =

Bahamian nationality law is regulated by the 1973 Constitution of the Commonwealth of The Bahamas, as amended; The Bahamas Nationality Act; The Bahamas Immigration Act; and various British Nationality laws. These laws determine who is, or is eligible to be, a national of The Bahamas. Bahamian nationality is typically obtained either on the principle of jus soli, i.e. by birth in The Bahamas; or under the rules of jus sanguinis, i.e. by birth abroad to a father with Bahamian nationality. It can also be granted to persons with an affiliation to the country, or to a permanent resident who has lived in the country for a given period of time through naturalisation. There is currently no program in The Bahamas for citizenship by investment. Nationality establishes one's international identity as a member of a sovereign nation. Though it is not synonymous with citizenship, rights granted under domestic law for domestic purposes, the United Kingdom, and thus the commonwealth, has traditionally used the words interchangeably.

== Acquiring Bahamian nationality ==
Bahamians may acquire nationality through adoption, birth, naturalisation, or registration.

=== Adoption ===
Upon the issuance of an adoption order, a minor child derives nationality from the adoptive parent. If the proceeding is a joint adoption, the child can only derive nationality from the father.

=== By birth ===
Birthright nationality applies to:

- Persons born within the territory to at least one Bahamian parent, which is interpreted to include a mother only, in the case of illegitimacy; (Note: Unwed Bahamian fathers may not pass nationality to their children.)
- Persons legitimately born abroad to a father who was born in The Bahamas; or if illegitimate to a Bahamian-born mother; or (Note: Neither women nor men who are considered "Bahamian by birth" can transmit their nationality to their children if the parent was born abroad.)
- Persons born upon an aircraft or ship which is registered in The Bahamas or an unregistered aircraft or ship belonging to the government.

=== By registration ===
Nationality by registration includes those who have familial or historic relationship affiliations with The Bahamas. Persons who acquire nationality by registration include:

- Persons who were defined as possessing "Bahamian status" under the terms of the Immigration Act of 1967, and on 9 July 1973 were considered a resident of The Bahamas;
- Persons who are nationals of other Commonwealth countries and who have lived in The Bahamas for at least six years;
- Persons born in The Bahamas after 9 July 1973 to non-national parents who upon reaching the age of majority have no other national affiliation or renounce other nationality and take an Oath of Allegiance within one year of attaining age 18;
- Persons born abroad to a Bahamian mother, after July 9th 1973, who at the time of birth was married to a non-national, if the registration occurs after attaining age 18 and before attaining age 21 and renunciation of other nationality and an Oath of Allegiance is administered;
- Women who were married to a national who acquired nationality at the time of independence, or but for death would have acquired nationality, upon taking an Oath of Allegiance; (Note: Foreign men who are married to Bahamian women are not allowed to derive nationality from a Bahamian spouse by registration.)
- Post-independence, the wife of a national who acquired nationality after independence, provided she takes an Oath of Allegiance; or
- Minor children of any national, at the discretion of the Minister for Nationality and Citizenship.

=== By naturalisation ===
Ordinary naturalisation in The Bahamas can be obtained by adult persons of legal capacity, who in the 12 months prior to submitting an application resided in the territory, are of good character, and intend to be a resident of the territory. Residency of a minimum of six years is required, but may include periods of service to the government. Applicants petition the Minister for Nationality and Citizenship, who evaluates whether the general criteria are met, whether the applicant poses a threat to national security or public policy, and whether there is a proficiency in English and adequate knowledge of the responsibilities of Bahamian citizenship. Upon approval, applicants must take an Oath of Allegiance.

== Loss of nationality ==
The Bahamas allows its nationals to voluntarily renounce their nationality if they are possessed of 21 years of age and legal capacity. They must verify that they have other nationality, which is not derived from a country in a state of war with The Bahamas. Nationals may be deprived of their status through acts of treason or disloyalty, criminal offences, fraud in a naturalisation application, taking nationality or exercising citizenship rights in another country, or performing services for a foreign military or government.

== Dual nationality ==
Dual nationality is not permitted in The Bahamas after age 21. Nationals who have dual status as a minor, must choose a single nationality upon reaching majority.

== Commonwealth citizenship ==
Bahamians are also Commonwealth citizens by default.

== History ==
=== Colonial period ===
After landing on San Salvador Island in 1492, Spain made no attempt to settle the Bahamian islands, though an early French colonisation may have been attempted in 1649. The first successful European settlement in the islands was made by English colonists from Bermuda, who settled on Eleuthera. Gradually settlement spread to other islands. In Britain, allegiance, in which subjects pledged to support a monarch, was the precursor to the modern concept of nationality. The crown recognised from 1350 that all persons born within the territories of the British Empire were subjects. Those born outside the realm – except children of those serving in an official post abroad, children of the monarch, and children born on a British sailing vessel – were considered by common law to be foreigners. Marriage did not affect the status of a subject of the realm. In 1670, Charles II of England granted the islands to the Lords Proprietors of Carolina. In 1717, the crown terminated the arrangement and the islands became part of the lands of the British Empire. In 1776, the islands were captured during the American Revolutionary War and taken by the Spanish in 1782, but were returned to Britain by 1783. Unlike other colonial powers with slave societies in the Caribbean, the British did not have a single slave code. Each British colony was allowed to establish its own rules about the slave trade, and a code was established for the Carolinas in 1690. Bahamian society was divided into a rigid and stratified system based upon color and class, with white Europeans at the top, and downward to brown Europeans and Asians, mixed-race persons, black creoles (native black people) and Africans. (Note: After the slave trade was barred in the British Empire, an additional group of black people arrived in the Bahamas. Between 1811 and 1838, Africans liberated from slave ships were taken to the islands and either apprenticed to learn trades for seven to fourteen years, or recruited for British military service.) Married women were subjugated to the authority of their husbands under coverture, and the law was structured to maintain social hierarchies by regulating familial matters like, who could marry, legitimacy, and inheritance. Children in slave societies followed the status of the mother, thus if she was free her children would be free or if she was in bondage, her children would also be bound.

Other than common law, there was no standard statutory law which applied for subjects throughout the realm, meaning different jurisdictions created their own legislation for local conditions, which often conflicted with the laws in other jurisdictions in the empire. (Note: For example though Britain typically banned foreign trade with any of its colonies, the Free Port Act 1787 allowed Nassau to trade with both the French and Spanish colonies of the Caribbean, and the following year, Britain allowed the United States to import or export goods brought to the British West Indies on British ships, while maintaining a ban on commodities for other colonies.) Nationality laws passed by the British Parliament were extended only to the Kingdom of Great Britain, and later the United Kingdom of Great Britain and Ireland. In 1807, the British Parliament passed the Slave Trade Act, barring the Atlantic slave trade in the empire. The Act did not abolish slavery, which did not end until the 1833 Emancipation Act went into effect in 1834. Under its terms, slaves were converted into apprentices and remained bound to their former owners for four years if they had worked in the home and for six years if they had been field labourers. The local ordinance in the Bahamas called for a four-year apprenticeship, which ended in 1838. Though free, there was never a British plan to give former slaves a voice in Parliament, leaving them as British subjects in a highly stratified system of rights. Denied political and economic rights, former slaves were not entitled to formal recognition as nationals by other nations.

In 1911, at the Imperial Conference a decision was made to draft a common nationality code for use across the empire. The British Nationality and Status of Aliens Act 1914 allowed local jurisdictions in the self-governing Dominions to continue regulating nationality in their territories, but also established an imperial nationality scheme throughout the realm. The uniform law, which went into effect on 1 January 1915, required a married woman to derive her nationality from her spouse, meaning if he was British, she was also, and if he was foreign, so was she. It stipulated that upon loss of nationality of a husband, a wife could declare that she wished to remain British and provided that if a marriage had terminated, through death or divorce, a British-born national who had lost her status through marriage could reacquire British nationality through naturalisation without meeting a residency requirement. The statute reiterated common law provisions for natural-born persons born within the realm on or after the effective date. By using the word person, the statute nullified legitimacy requirements for jus soli nationals. For those born abroad on or after the effective date, legitimacy was still required, and could only be derived by a child from a British father (one generation), who was natural-born or naturalised. Naturalisations required five years residence or service to the crown.

Amendments to the British statute were enacted in 1918, 1922, 1933 and 1943 changing derivative nationality by descent and modifying slightly provisions for women to lose their nationality upon marriage. Because of a rise in statelessness, a woman who did not automatically acquire her husband's nationality upon marriage or upon his naturalisation in another country, did not lose their British status after 1933. The 1943 revision allowed a child born abroad at any time to be a British national by descent if the Secretary of State agreed to register the birth. In the Bahamas, the government had also passed migration legislation, as early as 1920, but even in the 1928 Immigration Act, there was no definition of Bahamian nationality. Under the terms of the British Nationality Act 1948 British nationals in the Bahamas were reclassified at that time as "Citizens of the UK and Colonies" (CUKC). The basic British nationality scheme did not change overmuch, and typically those who were previously defined as British remained the same. Changes included that wives and children no longer automatically acquired the status of the husband or father, children who acquired nationality by descent no longer were required to make a retention declaration, and registrations for children born abroad were extended.

Independence movements which had swept through other colonies within the British West Indies, had not affected the Bahamas by the early 1950s. By 1954, the rise of party politics and the need for development brought social inequalities to the forefront. Racism exploded as an issue in 1955 when a Jamaican couple were stranded because of mechanical difficulties with their aeroplane and were denied hotel rooms. Pressure was placed on the government to develop a means for refusing to grant business licences to establishments that practised racial discrimination. In 1956, a resolution unanimously passed the Bahamian House of Assembly condemning discrimination. The breakthrough in social reform, led the way for political reform and by 1963 a push for internal self-government was underway. On 6 January 1964 a new Immigration Act was passed in the Bahamas adding categories of Bahamian-born and Bahamian Belonger, which included persons who may have been born abroad but had significantly contributed to the development of the Bahamas. The following day a new constitution granting internal self-government, but provided for British retention of authority for defence, foreign affairs, and internal security. It was amended in 1969 and on 10 July 1973, the colony gained full independence.

=== Post-Independence ===
Laurie Fransman, a leading expert on British nationality law, notes that under the terms of the 1973 Constitution of the Bahamas, the provisions to confer nationality and citizenship were "very restricted". Generally, persons who had previously been birthright nationals as defined under the classification of CUKC, would become nationals of The Bahamas on Independence Day. Under its terms, naturalised Bahamians did not gain Bahamian nationality until 9 July 1974, and persons who had nationality by descent only derived nationality if the father had been born in The Bahamas. Those who descended of naturalised or registered Bahamians were omitted and per The Bahamas Independence Act, if those persons held dual nationality on 10 July 1973, they ceased to be both Bahamian and British. Exceptions were made for persons to retain their British nationality and status if they (or their father or paternal grandfather) were born, naturalised, or registered in a part of the realm which remained on 10 July part of the United Kingdom or colonies, or in a place annexed or protected by Britain. No provisions were made for persons who had established the right of abode in the United Kingdom to retain their British nationality. Women retained or lost their Bahamian nationality based upon their spouse's status and were prohibited from maintaining British status as registered wives, if their spouse lost his CUKC status. (Note: Fransman states, "CUKC women generally retained or lost that citizenship [status] if or when the husband did and the registration entitlement contained in s 6(2) of the BNA 1948 was generally withdrawn from women whose husbands ceased to be CUKC".) From independence forward, women who married Barbadian men could choose to register for Bahamian nationality.

The Nationality Act of 1973 and Immigration Act of 1975 made clarifications which clearly delineated the differences between permanent residents and nationals/citizens. These provided a process whereby persons who did not derive nationality at independence could obtain permanent residency if they had lived in The Bahamas for five years, spoke English, and intended to make the islands their permanent home. The new legislation eliminated the "Bahamas Belonger" status, and those who had derived that status by marriage. The program required a dual application to the Ministry of National Security and the Immigration Board, payment of a $5,000 fee, and evidence of investment in a business or real estate. The new status neither allowed these residents to vote nor to work without a permit. Persons who had previously attained "Belonger" status were allowed to register without a fee for the new program, if they applied prior to August 1976.

The first post-independence attempt to modify the Constitution occurred under the direction of Prime Minister Hubert Ingraham in 2002. Among the issues in the proposed amendments to be reviewed by referendum were the establishment of a boundaries commission and a teaching service commission to monitor teaching standards; creation of an office for a parliamentary commissioner to carry out duties related to voting registration and elections; establishing the retirement ages of judges, and gender equality. After the failed referendum, a constitutional commission was appointed to evaluate needed changes and make recommendations. The commission produced two reports (2003 and 2006), but was unable to complete the process. In 2012, a new commission was called by Prime Minister Perry Christie. Four amendments were proposed in 2014 to address the issues of gender equality in the constitution. The amendments sought changes to allow a child born abroad to automatically derive nationality at birth, if either parent was a Bahamian national by birth; to allow the spouses of Bahamian nationals to equally acquire nationality through marriage regardless of gender; to grant an unwed Bahamian father the right to transmit nationality to his child; and to add "sex" as a prohibited basis for discrimination. In 2016, the referendum failed, amid an opposition campaign claiming that the amendments would pave the way for same-sex marriage.
