= European Centre for Modern Languages =

Organization based in Graz, Austria

The European Centre for Modern Languages (ECML) was founded on 8 April 1994 as an Enlarged Partial agreement of the Council of Europe in Graz, Austria. This type of agreement allows non-member states of the Council of Europe to participate. The ECML operates within the Council of Europe's Department of Education, part of the Directorate General of Democracy. The ECML was created through Resolution (94)10, which initiated a pilot phase until December 1997. Resolution (98)11 in July 1998 established the ECML as a permanent institution.

The ECML follows the European Cultural Convention, adopted on 19 December 1954 in Paris, which aims to foster mutual understanding between European peoples, promote cultural diversity, and encourage the study of languages, history, and civilisation. As articulated in Council of Europe Recommendation CM/Rec(2022)1, the ECML advocates for the importance of plurilingual and intercultural education for democratic culture.

The Austrian Association for the ECML (Verein EFSZ) representing the Austrian authorities provides and manages the centre's infrastructure, develops synergies with regional and local partners.

== Activities ==
The aim of the ECML is to "the implementation of language policies and the promotion of innovative approaches to the learning and teaching of modern languages".

The ECML's programme, which spans four years, is determined by its member states and reflects national concerns and emerging trends in language education. Project-oriented work and training and advisory activities are the two main areas of the ECML programme. In both areas, teams of experts from Europe and around the world develop practical materials, training modules or handouts for decision-makers, teacher trainers, teachers and other interest groups.

The current programme (2024–2027) focuses on Language education at the heart of democracy.

== European Day of Languages ==
Initiated by the Council of Europe in 2001, the European Day of Languages is celebrated annually on 26 September by the Council of Europe in collaboration with the European Commission. It aims to raise awareness of the linguistic richness of Europe, promote cultural and linguistic diversity and encourage life-long language learning. The ECML coordinates this Day in partnership with national relays from the 46 member states of the Council of Europe. The campaign website provides free materials in more than 40 languages, including minority languages such as Basque, Frisian, Catalan and Scots.

== Member states and partnerships ==
36 States joined the ECML: Albania, Andorra, Armenia, Austria (host country), Belgium, Bosnia and Herzegovina, Bulgaria, Croatia, Cyprus, the Czech Republic, Denmark, Estonia, Finland, France, Germany, Greece, Hungary, Iceland, Ireland, Latvia, Liechtenstein, Lithuania, Luxembourg, Malta, Montenegro, the Netherlands, North Macedonia, Norway, Poland, Romania, Serbia, Slovakia, Slovenia, Spain, Sweden, Switzerland.

The ECML also has a special agreement with Canada, under which the Official Languages and Bilingualism Institute (OLBI) at the University of Ottawa acts as the national contact point.

=== Cooperation with the European Commission ===
Since 2013, the ECML and the European Commission have cooperated to provide professional training opportunities for language experts within ECML and EU member states.

=== Cooperation with the Professional Network Forum ===
The ECML collaborates with international non-governmental organisations and institutions in language education through the Professional Network Forum. Members include:

- Association pour le Développement de l'Enseignement Bi/plurilingue (ADEB),
- American Council on the Teaching of Foreign Languages (ACTFL),
- International Association of Applied Linguistics (AILA),
- Association of Language Testers in Europe (ALTE),
- European Confederation of Language Centres in Higher Education (CercleS),
- European Association for Language Testing and Assessment (EALTA),
- Evaluation and Accreditation of Quality Language Services (EAQUALS),
- European Civil Society Platform for Multilingualism (ECSPM),
- Education et Diversité Linguistique et Culturelle (EDiLiC),
- Conseil européen pour les langues/European Language Council (CEL/ELC),
- European Federation of National Institutions for Language (EFNIL),
- European Parents' Association (EPA),
- European Union National Institutes for Culture (EUNIC),
- Fédération internationale des professeurs de langues vivantes (FIPLV),
- International Association of Multilingualism (IAM)
- International Certificate Conference e.V. (ICC)
- Official Languages and Bilingualism Institute (OLBI) of the University of Ottawa.

=== Cooperation with the Language Network Graz ===
Founded in 2007, the Language Network Graz brings together local and regional organisations in education and culture to jointly promote multilingualism through initiatives such as the annual language festival in Graz.

== See also ==
- Common European Framework of Reference for Languages
- European Charter for Regional or Minority Languages
- Framework Convention for the Protection of National Minorities
- Languages of Europe
- Languages of the European Union
- List of linguistic rights in European constitutions
- Linguistic rights
- Universal Declaration of Linguistic Rights
