= Tito Scaiano =

Argentine and Canadian chemist

Juan Cesar (Tito) Scaiano, OC, FRSC (born 1945) first came to Canada in 1975 as a visiting scientist with the National Research Council from Argentina. Returning to the NRC in 1979, he developed an innovative new program studying organic reaction intermediates using laser techniques. He then joined the University of Ottawa in 1991 as a professor of chemistry.

Current projects in the Scaiano Research Group include such diverse topics as fluorescent sensors, photolithography, persistent free radicals, and nanoparticles.

Since then he has won many national and international awards for his work in photochemistry. He was the first to use two lasers to follow photochemical changes in short-lived intermediates during a reaction which allows scientists to measure photochemical reactions. He has won awards including the Premier's Platinum Medal for Research Excellence, which is one of the largest single research awards in the world, the Tory Medal, the Rutherford Memorial Medal, the Izaak-Walton-Killam Award, and the 2002 Gerhard Herzberg Canada Gold Medal for Science and Engineering. In 2020, he received the Nicholas J. Turro award.

In 2005 he was appointed an Officer of the Order of Canada. The citation reads:

Juan Scaiano is one of Canada's most eminent chemists. His work has shaped the field of physical organic chemistry over the last 25 years and its impact has extended to the pharmaceutical, microelectronics, and pulp and paper industries. A renowned expert in the field of photochemistry, he pioneered the use of lasers to study and measure organic reactions. Distinguished professor at the University of Ottawa and holder of the Canada Research Chair in Applied Photochemistry, he has been an inspiring teacher to students, nurturing their creative spirit and conveying to them a sense of community responsibility.

He is a member of the Centre for Research in Photonics at the University of Ottawa. He also founded a company named Luzchem which builds and sells photochemistry equipment.
