= Venkatesan =

Venkatesan is both a given name and a surname. Notable people with the name include:

== Given name ==
- Venkatesan Devarajan (born 1973), Indian boxer
- Venkatesan Guruswami (born 1976), Indian computer scientist
- Loganatha Venkatesan (1974–2001), Indian foreign worker and murderer executed in Singapore

== Surname ==
- L. Venkatesan, Indian politician
- Madhavi Venkatesan, American economist
- P. R. S. Venkatesan, Indian politician
- Rani Venkatesan, Indian politician
- Rose Venkatesan (born 1980), Indian television personality
- S. Venkatesan (born 1970), Indian writer
