= IBWA =

IBWA can refer to:

- International Bottled Water Association
- International Brotherhood Welfare Association, American philanthropic organization in the early 20th century
