= University of Ottawa =

Public university in Ontario, Canada

- Université d'Ottawa
- Coat of arms
- Latin: Universitas Ottaviensis (Note: The university used the form 'Universitas Ottaviensis' on its Latin diplomas, and on old versions of its coat of arms, as still seen on the front of Hagen Hall: Sonnen, John Paul (December 14, 2011). "Universitas Ottaviensis". Orbis Catholicus Secundus. Alternatively, 'Universitas Ottawensis' appears at the base of the statue in front of Tabaret Hall: "Père Joseph-Henri Tabaret O.M.I." Waymarking.com.)
- Former names: College of Bytown (1848–1861); College of Ottawa (1861–1866)
- Motto: Deus scientiarum Dominus est (Latin)
- Motto in English: "God is the master of the sciences"
- Type: Public university
- Established: 1848; 178 years ago
- Academic affiliations: ACUFC; COU; IAU; U15; UArctic; Universities Canada
- Endowment: CA$333.880 million (2023)
- Budget: CA$1.625 billion (2024)
- Chancellor: Claudette Commanda
- President: Marie-Eve Sylvestre
- Provost: Jacques Beauvais
- Academic staff: 2,911
- Administrative staff: 2,839
- Students: 48,800
- Undergraduates: 39,770
- Postgraduates: 8,600
- Location: Ottawa, Ontario, Canada; 45.4222°N 75.6824°W
- Campus: Urban, 42.5 hectares (105 acres)
- Language: English and French
Colours
Garnet and Grey
- Nickname: Gee-Gees
- Sporting affiliations: U Sports – OUA, QSSF
- Website: www.uottawa.ca

The University of Ottawa (French: Université d'Ottawa), often referred to as uOttawa, is a bilingual public research university in Ottawa, Ontario, the capital city of Canada. The main campus is located on 42.5 hectares (105 acres) directly to the northeast of Downtown Ottawa across the Rideau Canal in the Sandy Hill neighbourhood.

The University of Ottawa was first established as the College of Bytown in 1848 by the first bishop of the Catholic Archdiocese of Ottawa, Joseph-Bruno Guigues. Placed under the direction of the Oblates of Mary Immaculate, it was renamed the College of Ottawa in 1861 and received university status five years later through an act of the Parliament of the Province of Canada. On February 5, 1889, the university was granted a pontifical charter by Pope Leo XIII, elevating the institution to a pontifical university. The university was reorganized on July 1, 1965, as a corporation, independent from any outside body or religious organization. As a result, the civil and pontifical charters were kept by the newly created Saint Paul University, federated with the university. The remaining civil faculties were retained by the reorganized university.

The University of Ottawa is the largest English-French bilingual university in the world. The university offers a wide variety of academic programs, administered by ten faculties: Arts, Education, Engineering, Health Sciences, Law, Medicine, Science, Social Sciences, and the Telfer School of Management. The University of Ottawa Library includes 12 branches, holding a collection of over 5.9 million titles. The university is a member of the Canadian U15 group of research-intensive universities, with a research income of CA$420 million in 2022.

The school is co-educational and enrols almost 40,000 undergraduate and over 8,500 post-graduate students. The school has enrolled 2,300 students into the French Immersion Studies program in fall 2022. The school has approximately 10,600 international students from 150 countries, accounting for 26 per cent of the student population. The university has a network of more than 250,000 alumni. The university's athletic teams are known as the Gee-Gees and are members of U Sports.

== History ==
The university was established on September 26, 1848, as the College of Bytown by the first Roman Catholic bishop of Ottawa, Joseph-Bruno Guigues. He entrusted administration to the Missionary Oblates of Mary Immaculate. The college was originally located in Lower Town, housed in a wooden building next to the Notre-Dame Cathedral Basilica. However, space quickly became an issue for administrators, triggering two moves in 1852 and a final move to Sandy Hill in 1856. The Sandy Hill property was donated by Louis-Théodore Besserer, where he offered a substantial parcel from his estate for the college. The college was renamed College of Ottawa in 1861, following the city's name change from Bytown to Ottawa. In 1866, the college received university status via an act of the Parliament of the Province of Canada (29 & 30 Victoria CXXXV), making it the final institution in Canada to receive a national charter before the British North America Act, 1867 made education a provincial responsibility. By 1872 the university had already begun to confer undergraduate degrees, with master's degrees coming in 1875 and doctoral degrees in 1888. On February 5, 1889, the university was granted a pontifical charter from Pope Leo XIII, elevating the university to a pontifical university.

The university faced a crisis when fire destroyed the main building on December 2, 1903. After the fire, the university hired New York architect A. O. Von Herbulis to design its replacement, Tabaret Hall. It was among the first Canadian structures to be completely fireproof, built of reinforced concrete. Women first enrolled in 1919.

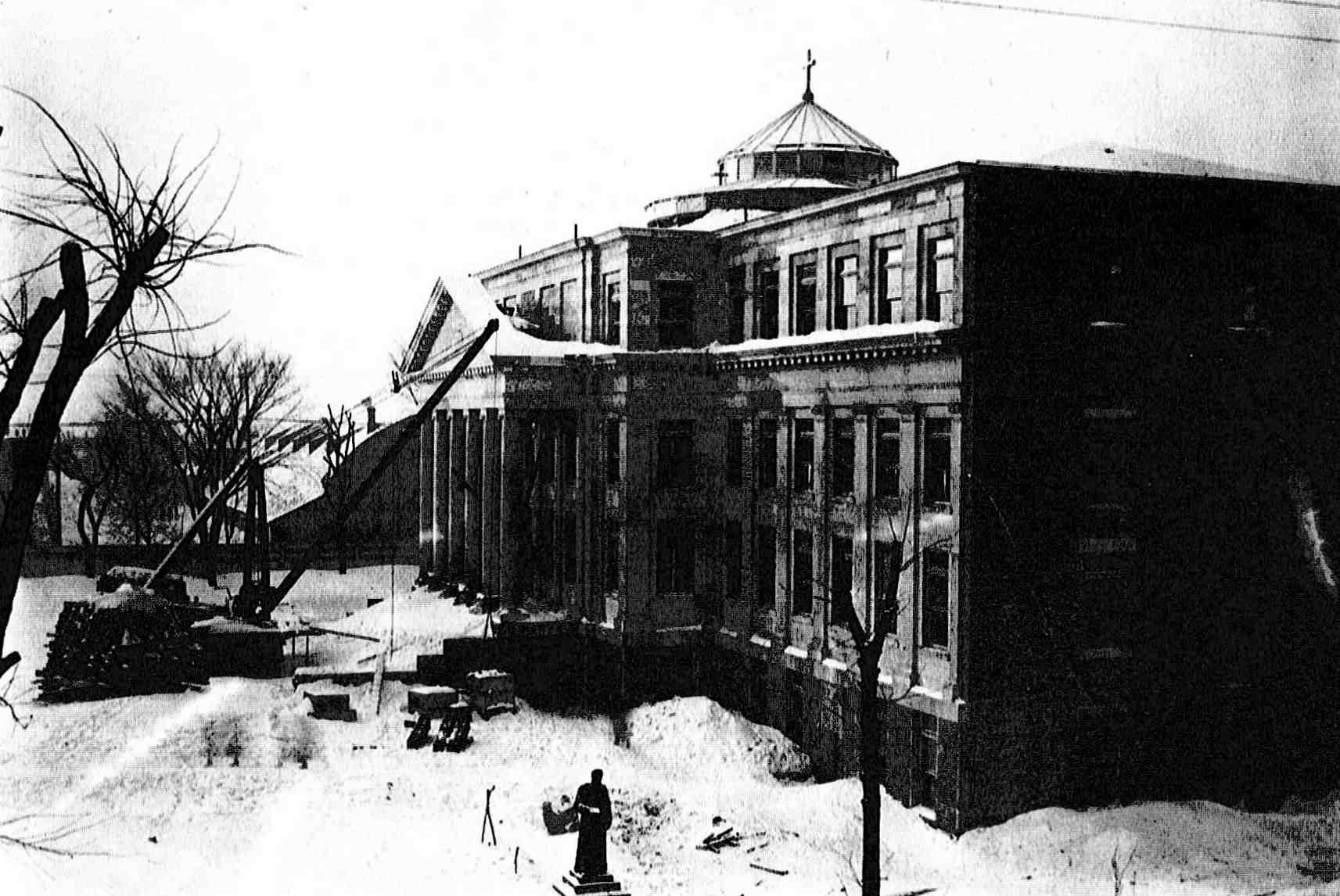
Tabaret Hall under construction in 1903 (completed in 1905). Construction began earlier in the year after fire destroyed the university's main building.

In the fall of 1939, a Canadian Officer Training Corp was established at the university, with training beginning in January 1940. The Canadian Officers' Training Corps, University of Ottawa Contingent, which comprised a company, headquarters and three platoons in 1939, was authorized to become a battalion in 1940. By 1941, the unit swelled to 550 men. An air force Officers' Training Corp was created in 1942 and a naval Officers' training corp in 1943. Participation in one of the three corps became mandatory for all students over 18, although they were not obliged to participate in the actual war at the end of their studies. During this time, the Royal Canadian Air Force used parts of the university's grounds for training and the university constructed barracks to house members of the Canadian Women's Army Corps. In total 1,158 students and alumni of the university enrolled the Canadian Forces during the Second World War, of which 50 died overseas. The unit was eventually disbanded during the unification of the Armed Forces in 1968.

The Ottawa architecture firm of Burgess, McLean & MacPhadyen designed the Eastern Ontario Institute of Technology (later to merge with the Ontario Vocational Centre and renamed Algonquin College), opened its new Rideau Campus on a 12-acre city owned Lees Avenue site in 1964. After being unused for a number of years, the midcentury academic complex was sold to the University of Ottawa in January 2007.

The university was reorganized on July 1, 1965, as a corporation independent from any outside body or religious organization, becoming publicly funded. As a result, the civil and pontifical charters were transferred to the newly created Saint Paul University, federated with the corporation, while the remaining civil faculties were retained by the reorganized university.

In 1970, 100 Laurier East became property of the University of Ottawa, acquired at a cost of $1,120,900. Previously named Juniorat du Sacré-Coeur, the property became the university's oldest building after it was acquired. At a cost of $28,000, it was built by Joseph Bourque, a Hull contractor and church builder, and completed in 1894. The Juniorat du Sacré-Coeur provided classical education for young men who wished to pursue a religious life and join the Order of the Oblates of Mary Immaculate. The building was expanded in 1937, an expansion that was indistinguishable from the original structure. The huge cross that used to dominate the top of the building was removed after its purchase, leaving only small references to the building's religious history as the Juniorat du Sacré-Coeur. The property now houses the university's department of Visual Arts. It is located at the corner of Laurier Avenue and Cumberland Street, near the Rideau Canal.

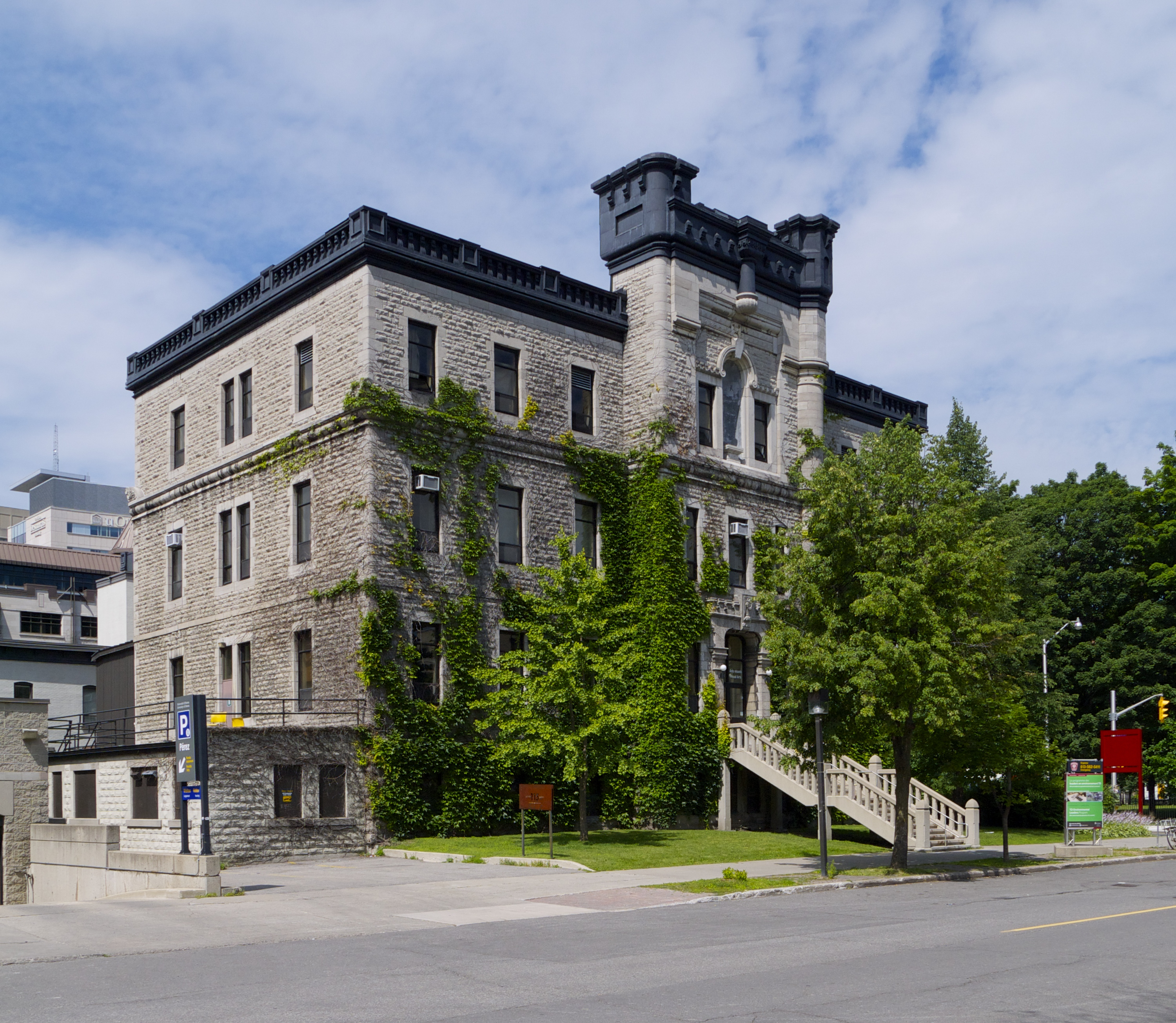
Constructed in 1893, 100 Laurier Avenue East is the oldest building at the university. The building was acquired by the university in 1970.

In 1974, a new policy mandated by the Government of Ontario strengthened institutional bilingualism at the university, with specific instructions to further bilingualism and biculturalism and preserve and develop French culture.

In 1989, Dr. Wilbert Keon of the University of Ottawa Heart Institute performed the country's first neonatal artificial heart transplant on an 11-day-old baby.

On November 11, 1998, during the University of Ottawa's 150th-anniversary celebrations, two war memorial plaques were unveiled in the foyer of Tabaret Hall which honour 1000 graduates of the university community who took part in armed conflict, especially the list of 50 graduates who lost their lives.

The engineering building, Colonel By Hall, was unveiled in September 2005 as a memorial dedicated to Lieutenant-Colonel John By, Royal Engineers.

== Campus ==
The university's main campus is situated within the neighbourhood of Sandy Hill (Côte-de-Sable). The main campus is bordered to the north by the ByWard Market district, to the east by Sandy Hill's residential area, and to the southwest by Nicholas Street, which runs adjacent to the Rideau Canal on the western half of the university. As of the 2010–2011 academic year, the main campus occupied 35.3 ha (87 acres), though the university owns and manages other properties throughout the city, raising the university's total extent to 42.5 ha (105 acres). The main campus moved two times before settling in its final location in 1856. When the institution was first founded, the campus was located next to the Notre-Dame Cathedral Basilica. With space a major issue in 1852, the campus moved to a location that is now across from the National Gallery of Canada. In 1856, the institution moved to its present location.

The buildings at the university vary in age from 100 Laurier (1893) to 150 Louis-Pasteur Private (2018). In 2011 the average age of buildings was 63. In the 2011–2012 academic year, the university owned and managed 30 main buildings, 806 research laboratories, 301 teaching laboratories and 257 classrooms and seminar rooms. The main campus is divided between its older Sandy Hill campus and its Lees campus, purchased in 2007. While Lees Campus is not adjacent to Sandy Hill, it is displayed as part of the main campus on school maps. Lees campus, within walking distance of Sandy Hill, was originally a satellite campus owned by Algonquin College.

An O-Train station, uOttawa station, is situated on the western periphery of the campus adjacent to Nicholas Street and the Rideau Canal.

=== Library ===
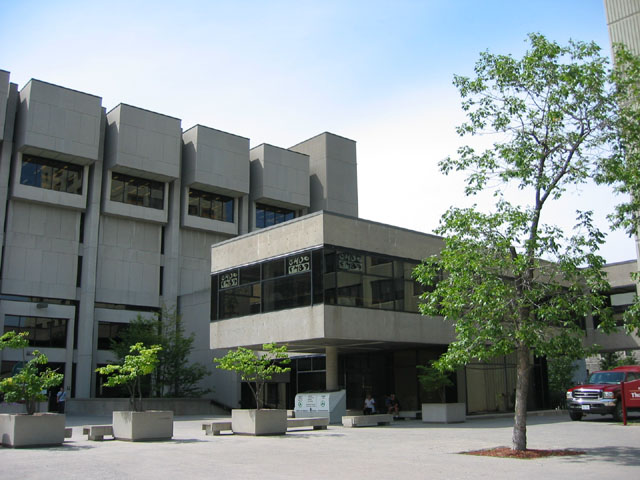
Morisset Library is the main library for the university and houses the majority of its special collections.

The University of Ottawa Library is a network of twelve locations, and maintains a collection of approximately two million printed books, one million e-books, 423,986 maps, 87,216 music items and more with its collection budget of CA$15 million. The Library has digitized over 20,000 French books and some of the aerial photographs from the National Air Photo Library collection which are in the public domain. In addition, with consent from the National Aboriginal Health Organization's (NAHO) Board of Directors, the Library and the Indigenous Program at the Faculty of Medicine archived the NAHO's website using Archive It which is no longer publicly available.

The main library is in Morisset Hall, which also houses the Media Centre, Archives and Special Collections, and the Geographic, Statistical and Government Information Centre. The university has five other specialized libraries: the Brian Dickson Law Library, located in Fauteux Hall; the Health Sciences Library, located at the Roger-Guindon campus; the Management Library, located in the Desmarais Building; the Isobel Firestone Music Library, located in Pérez Hall; and the Annex, an off-site storage facility that houses less-used portions of the collection.

The Morisset Library was named for Auguste-Marie Morisset who was a chief librarian from 1934 to 1958 and the Brian Dickson Law Library was named for Brian Dickson who was the chief justice of Canada. The Archives and Special Collections in Morisett Library contains holdings on a variety of subjects, particularly on feminism movement in Canada and it has the largest collection of feminist publications in Canada from periodicals and newsletters including Branching Out and Broadside. In addition, in 2018, the Archives and Special Collections collaborated with the Library and Archives Canada and the International Network of Women Engineers and Scientists – Education and Research Institute (INWES-ERI) founded by Monique Frize for the project of Canadian Archive of Women in STEM to develop a search index portal to facilitate discovery in one central location.

In addition to housing the university's collections, the library also maintains the Learning Crossroads, which features two lecture halls and more than 1,000 individual and group study rooms. It houses a wide range of cutting-edge technologies like a video wall, featuring a large 8K screen, virtual reality equipment and multimedia studios. The University of Ottawa Library is a member of the Canadian Association of Research Libraries, the Association of Research Libraries, and the Ontario Council of University Libraries.

==== History ====
The library dates back to the foundation of the institution in 1848. In 1903, the main building of the university where the library was located was destroyed by fire; therefore, all the intellectual treasures were lost. After this fire, it was top priority for the university authorities to rebuild the library and it had received donations from Canadian Federal and Provincial Governments and Foreign governments, particularly from France, United States, Great Britain, and other countries. On October 15, 1932, the Carnegie Corporation of New York informed that a grant of US$1,500 would be donated to the library over a period of three years which was used for the foundation of the library. In addition, in 1938, the French Government donated a gift which allowed the library to purchase books to the value of CA$800 and the foundation of the Society of Friends of the Library of the University of Ottawa was founded to help the library restore.

=== Museum ===
The University of Ottawa Museum of Classical Antiquities was established in 1975 as a teaching collection, operated by the Department of Classical and Religious Studies. Composed of artifacts which reflect daily life during the period from the 7th century BC to the 7th century AD, the permanent collection is enhanced by touring exhibitions. The university also houses a student-run gallery space, known as Gallery 115 on the main floor of 100 Laurier East. The student-run gallery provides students the opportunity to work within a gallery setting. It provides graduate and undergraduate students a chance to develop curatorial and administrative skills, as well as, display their own art pieces. In co-operation with the University of Ottawa, the Gallery operates under a democratic structure representing many students enrolled in various programs, including Visual Arts, Art History and Art Administration.

=== Housing and student facilities ===
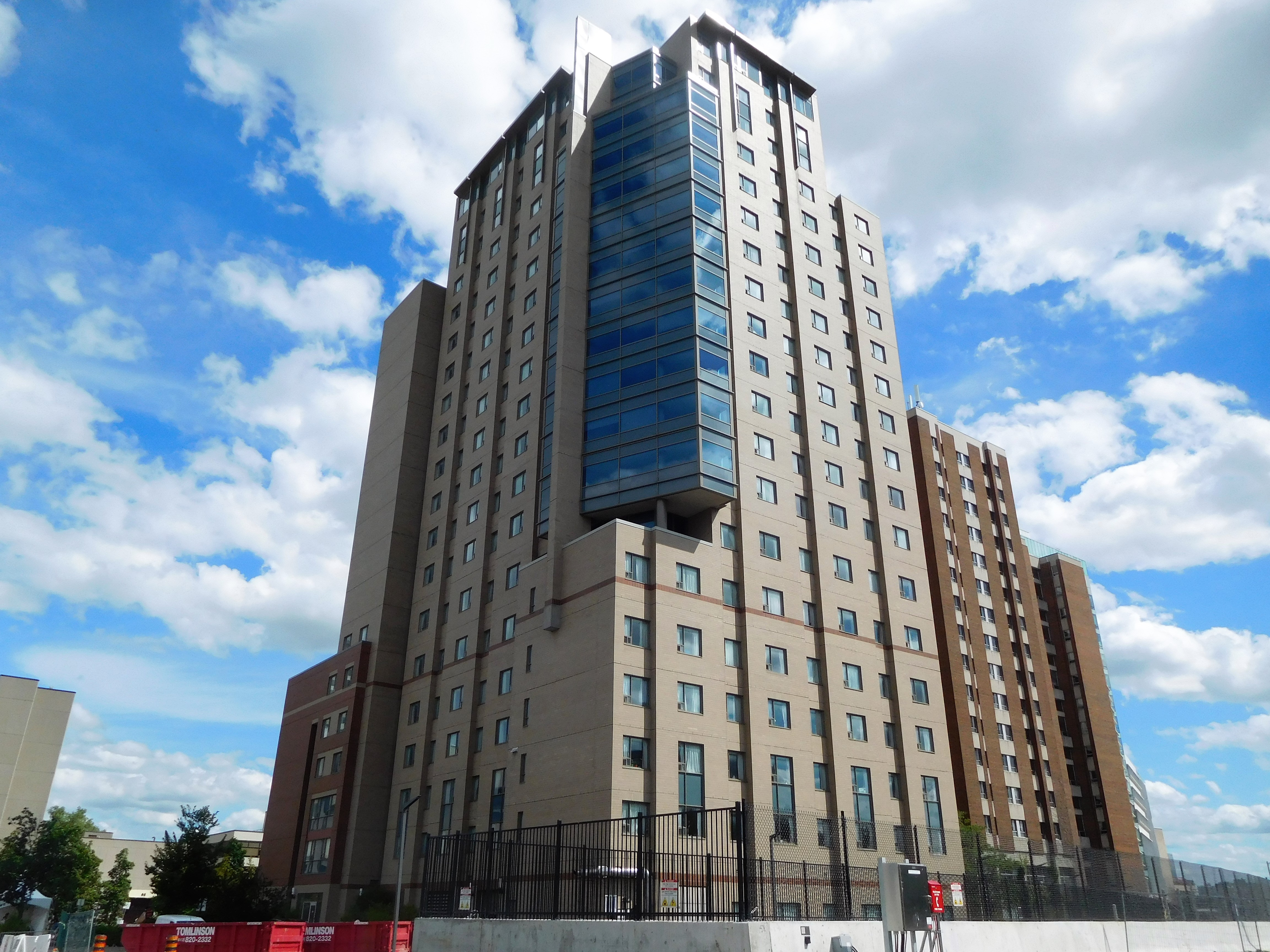
90 University is a high-rise and is one of ten student residences at the university.

Although most students live off-campus, the university has eleven student residences: Leblanc Hall, Marchand Hall, Stanton, Thompson Hall, Hyman Soloway, Friel, Henderson, Rideau, 45 Mann, 90 University and Annex. The university offers a variety of housing options. Four of the seven residences are conventional single and double bedrooms. Brooks and Hyman Soloway are 2–4 bedroom apartment-styled residences, while 90 University is a two bedroom suite-styled residence. On January 24, 2018, the new Annex residence was officially announced to students in an email newsletter from the school's 'The Gee' news outlet. The new residence opened in September 2018; it has 1-5 bedroom units including studio-styled single rooms. In September 2010, 26.2 per cent of first-year students lived on campus, part of the 8.8 per cent of the overall undergraduate population which lived on campus. Data from 2019 indicate nearly 3,000 students living on campus.

Residents are represented by the Residents' Association of the University of Ottawa (RAUO). With a mandate to help improve the quality of life in residences, each building elects a representative to the association. The RAUO also provides a political representation on the behalf of the residents. Buildings may collect a small fee, known as the floor fund to pay for the group.

The Jock Turcot University Centre (UCU) is the centre of student life and programming. Located between Montpetit Hall and Morisett Library, the centre was completed in 1973 at a cost of over CA$6 million. In spring of 2017, an expanded rooftop patio was added to the university's 'UCU', allowing students to have a more open campus in a downtown setting. Funding for the centre was partially offset by the Jock Turcot University Fund, which was set up by the student body. The centre was named after former student federation president Jock Turcot, who was killed in a traffic collision in 1965. The university has over thirty-five dining outlets. This includes several major restaurant chains.

=== Off-campus facilities ===
Off-campus faculties are located throughout Ottawa. The university owns and operates another campus located in Ottawa's Riverview neighbourhood, known as the Health Science or Alta Vista campus. Located on Smyth Road, the Health Science campus is 7.2 ha (18 acres). The campus primarily serves the Faculty of Medicine as well as hosting programs for the Faculty of Health Sciences. Roger Guindon Hall serves as the primary building for students at the campus. The Health Science campus is located in between The Ottawa Hospital and the Children's Hospital of Eastern Ontario, both of which are university-affiliated. Many of the hospital's health professionals and researchers teach in the Faculties of Medicine and Health Sciences. Medical and health sciences students learn on the job at The Ottawa Hospital.

The university operates the Centre for Executive Leadership at the World Exchange Plaza. Located on O'Connor Street in Downtown Ottawa, the centre is primarily used by the Telfer School of Management's Executive Master of Business Administration program. The centre includes one amphitheatre-style classroom, seven case rooms for team meetings, collaborative work and/or independent study and conference and boardroom spaces.

The university also maintains a small campus in Kanata focused on encouraging student employment at the many technology companies based in the Kanata North Technology Park.

=== Sustainability ===
The Office of Campus Sustainability, established in 2006, coordinates, promotes and implements sustainable development activities. The Office of Campus Sustainability is headed by the Sustainable Development Committee. Membership of the committee comprises administrators, students, community groups and the City of Ottawa. Along with the other members of the Council of Ontario Universities, the University of Ottawa signed a pledge in November 2009 known as Ontario Universities Committed to a Greener World, with the objective of transforming its campus into a model of environmental responsibility. The university is a signatory of the Talloires Declaration.

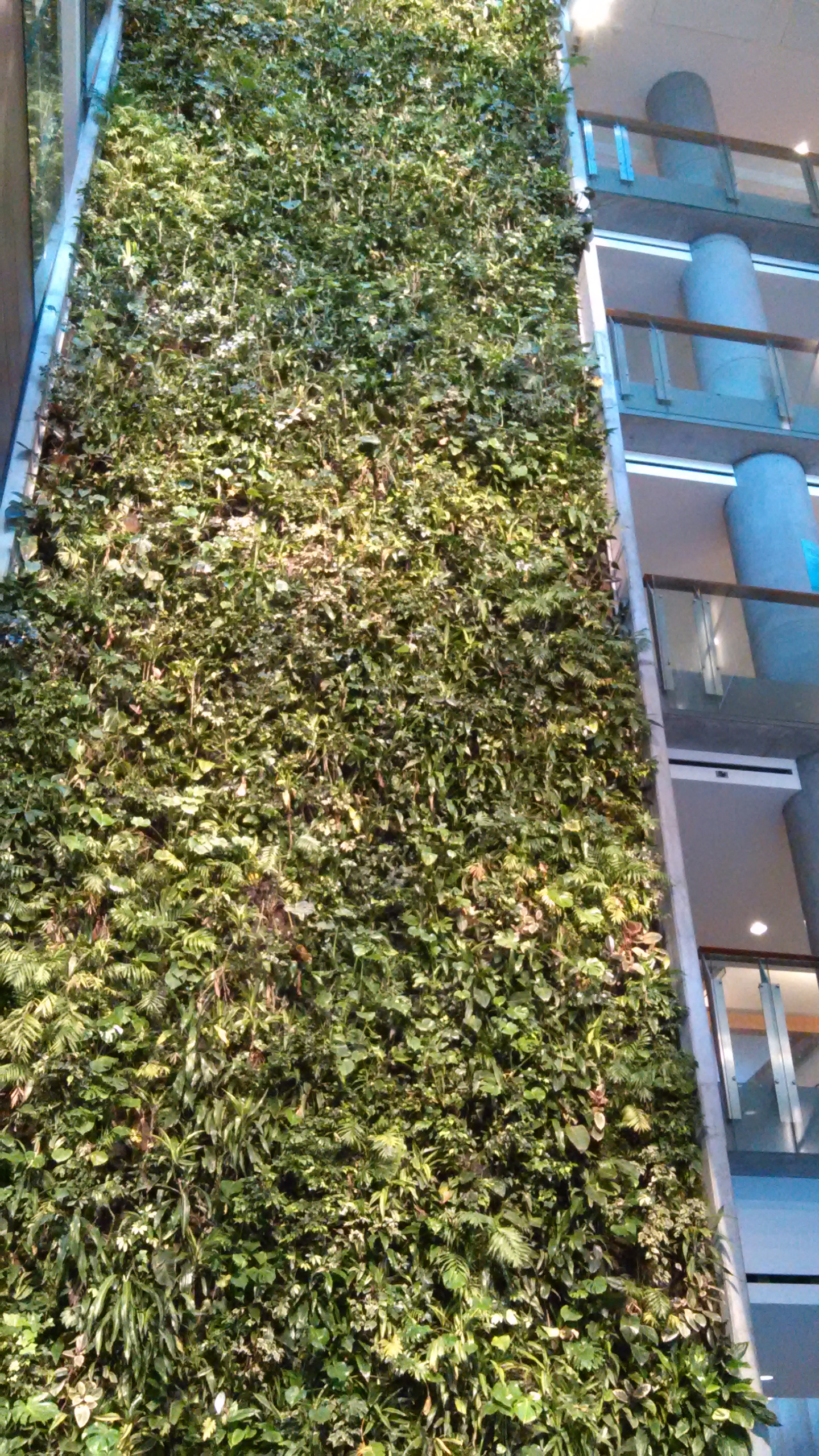
The green wall in the Faculty of Social Science building is the tallest living biofilter in North America. The green wall is one example of the university's sustainability projects.

Several programs from the university placed in the 2011 Corporate Knights rankings, which measures how well Canadian universities integrate sustainability into their curriculum. Telfer School of Management ranked fifth in Canada for undergraduate business programs. The Corporate Knights also ranked Telfer eighth in Canada for MBA program. The University of Ottawa has implemented a variety of activities in order to increase sustainability across campus. The university has been working on creating a more sustainable campus through the efforts of the Office of Campus Sustainability.

One of the main programs occurring at the University of Ottawa to promote waste reduction is RecycleMania. RecycleMania is a competition among colleges and universities that occurs within a 10-week period of time. Each school is to report their trash and recycling data which are then ranked according to the largest quantity of recyclables. The purpose of this competition is to see who has the highest recycling rate. As results fluctuate among competitors, schools get more enticed to keep reducing waste. In 2011, the University of Ottawa was awarded first place among Canadian universities in the RecycleMania competition. The university also ranked 14th out of 180 universities in the "waste minimization" category in the international RecycleMania competition. The RecycleMania program will continue to encourage and inform University of Ottawa students on how to change their consumption habits as well as recycle.

One of the newer programs initiated by the University of Ottawa is the Free Store. The Free Store is a location in which students can drop off items they no longer want and pick up items they do want for free. The reason this was created was to reduce consumption by offering free items to students who no longer want items that may be used by someone else. The Free Store is located at 647 King Edward. In 2007, the Office of Campus Sustainability coined the term "Gratuiterie" as the French translation to their Free Store. Since then, the concept of la Gratuiterie has gained widespread popularity in France, namely in Grenoble where the first Gratuiterie appeared. Since then France has seen a boom of "Gratuiteries" around the country.

On September 1, 2010, the University of Ottawa stopped selling bottled water on campus and created a bottled water ban in order to reduce plastic consumption, and encourage students to carry reusable water bottles and use campus water fountains. The University of Ottawa put forth $150,000 to improve the water fountains across campus.

The new Social Sciences Building at the University of Ottawa is the school's latest green initiative. The fifteen-storey building that took about four years of planning and construction to complete opened its doors in September 2012. The Social Sciences Building that cost a grand total of $112.5 million provides students and faculty with an array of space for individual studying and group work. This building is the newest addition to the University of Ottawa with its green and sustainable architecture and facilities. Some features that the building includes are: construction materials that were chosen due to their recycled content, a living wall that is five stories tall and composed of numerous plants that with act as an air filtration system, and a green roof. The green wall is the tallest living biofilter wall in North America. The wall is situated in the main agora of the Faculty of Social Science building and is visible from the outside. The green wall is a unique component of the building's air handling system, for it is capable of treating a large quantity of air at a time, and it provides a source of humidity that does not need to be artificially introduced.

The living wall was built on October 14, 2012, by Diamond & Shmitt Architects. After 12 years the wall had reached the end of its life and was in need of revitalization. In May 2024, the university's Office of Indigenous Affairs unveiled the updated living wall that both revitalized the project and incorporated indigenous art motifs from a local artist. The new version of the living wall was built by Livescape Inc. over the course of two and a half months, removing the previous built-in system and replacing it with a new irrigation control systems, lighting and 8,200 plants. Spanning six stories and 77-feet tall, the wall now incorporates an art piece from local Algonquin artist, Stephanie Tenasco. The piece is meant to resemble the beaded floral work Indigenous artists are known for, specifically incorporating a strawberry motif, known as the heart berry in indigenous cultures to "represent the hearts connected within the community and new beginnings".

Eighty per cent of the building's heating will be recycled and created through the building's data centres (computer labs, etc.). This heating system will also heat nearby buildings including Vanier Hall. Not only has the University of Ottawa stayed true to their reputation of being on the forefront of sustainable living by creating the green wall, but they have also created a green roof, which is potentially the first green roof constructed on a Canadian university campus. The green roof was established in 1971 on the rooftop of the Colonel By building. One of the faculty's goals is to achieve a LEED Gold Certification, which is given to green buildings that meet specific environmental guidelines.

In 2006, the University of Ottawa established the first community campus garden. Over the course of the past eight years, the community garden has expanded in terms of the number of plants that occupy it, and has grown into a full-fledged garden containing more than thirty pots in various locations on campus. The community garden is open from early spring until mid-autumn. In addition to the various eco-friendly accomplishments that have been added to the university over the years, in 2005, the university established a boreal forest and wetland environment, and is in the middle of creating a living classroom for students to enjoy. The University of Ottawa is on the rise to being one of the top eco-friendly Canadian universities in North America.

The University of Ottawa has also introduced a bike share program to encourage cycling to and from school. The university offers free bicycle rentals and access to free maintenance and repair workshops. Along with new bike routes and services, the university has enhanced car-pooling and shuttle services, and is served by uOttawa and Lees stations along O-Train Line 1, encouraging students to use public transit via a discounted university student bus pass.

The Association for the Advancement of Sustainability in Higher Education (AASHE) provides various activities that attempt to increase sustainability practices among individuals and institutions, promote resource sharing, and make sustainable practices a norm within higher education institutions. The Sustainability Tracking, Assessment and Rating System (STARS), created by AASHE, was designed to provide guidelines for better understanding of sustainability and build a more sustainable community throughout university campuses. It is a way for universities and colleges to measure their sustainability efforts. The program compares higher education facilities' sustainability initiatives and ranks them based on their efforts. In 2011, the University of Ottawa received a silver star by the STARS program.

The Office of Campus Sustainability continues to create various events and programs to promote sustainability among students at the University of Ottawa. They are responsible for informing students of all initiatives and programs put forth by the university. Eco-friendly initiatives are growing rapidly at the University of Ottawa with the help of the office. One of them is "Cleaning the capital".

== Administration ==
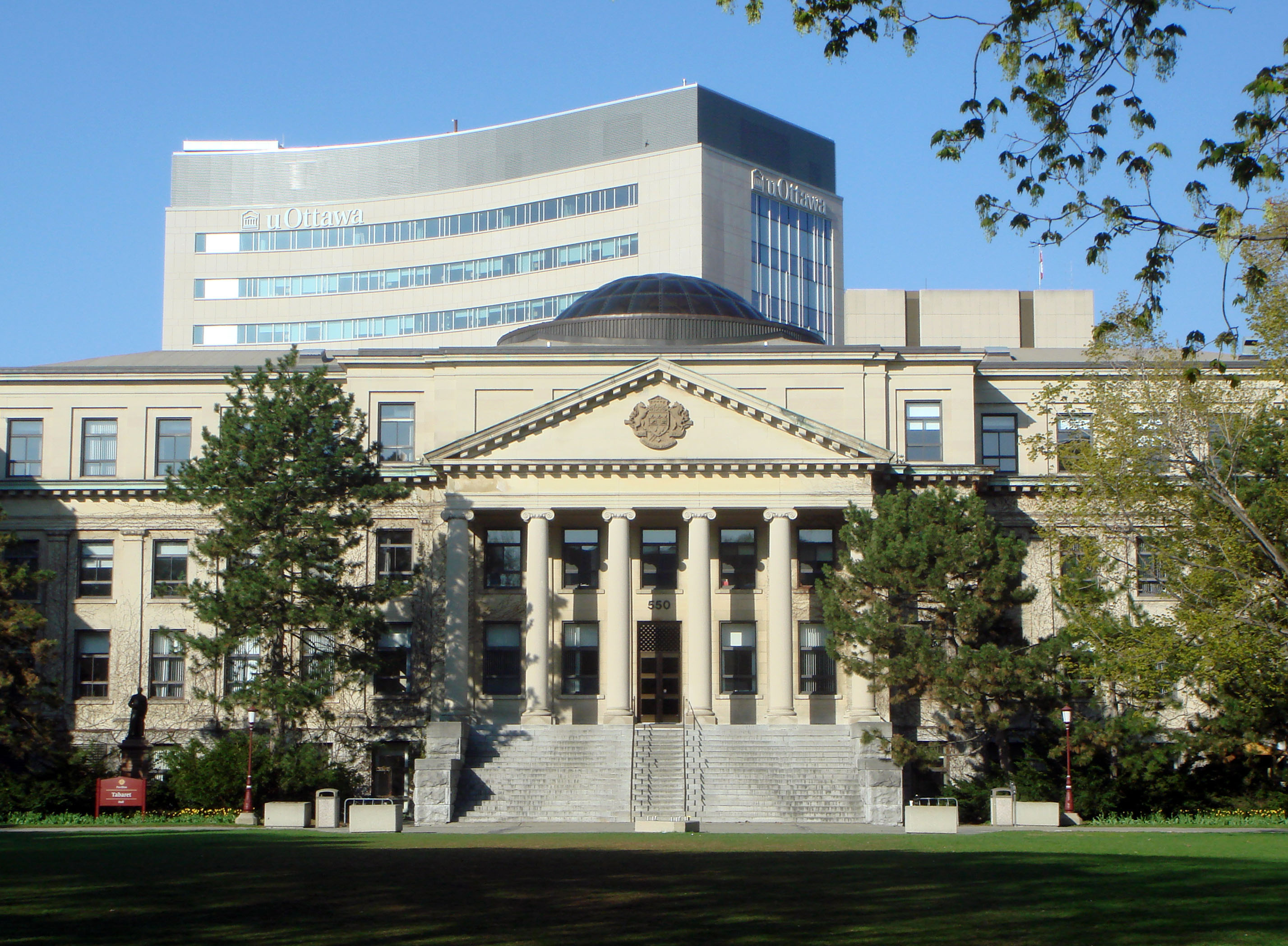
Tabaret Hall was named after Joseph-Henri Tabaret and houses the university's administrative offices.

Governance is conducted through the Board of Governors and the Senate, whose roles were established by the University of Ottawa Act, 1965. The Act describes their membership and powers, as well as their principal officers. The Board provides overall governance and management, including financial decisions and the implementation of policies and procedures. The Board consists of an executive committee which includes the chair of the board and the vice-chair and chair of the executive committee. As stipulated by the act, the board comprises no more than 32 members, appointed or elected by the various parts of the university community. While not stipulated in the act, the board's membership includes elected undergraduate and graduate student representatives. The Board includes one honorary member, the current chancellor.

The Senate sets educational policies and the management of academic issues. Such powers include the ability to create and abolish faculties, departments, schools and institutes, academic regulations, admission standards, degree and diploma requirements. It confers certificates, degrees at all levels and with the approval of the board, honorary doctorates. The Senate consists of 72 members including president, who acts as its chair. Other members of the Senate, as mentioned in the act, include the chancellor, the president, vice-presidents and the dean of each faculty, including those of federated universities. While not outlined in the act, the Senate includes students from each faculty.

As stipulated in the act, the chancellor is the university's titular head and is accorded a place of honour at commencement exercises and other functions and may preside at examinations. The chancellor is appointed by the board with the concurrence of the Senate and holds the office for one or more four-year terms. The president is the chief executive officer and chairman of the Senate with the responsibility of managing the direction of academic work and general administration, teaching staff, officers, servants and students. The president is appointed by the board and continues until the board votes otherwise. The office was first referred to as superior until the university received a pontifical charter, when the name changed to rector in 1889. In 2004, the English title of rector was replaced with president.

=== Finances ===
In the 2021-2022 review of financial results, net assets stood at CA$1.793 billion, which is a decrease of $174.7M (8.9%) in 2022 compared to 2021. Revenue increased by $93.9M to reach $1,246.1M, compared to $1,152.2M in 2020–2021. The largest single source of revenue originates from tuition and other fees, along with grant revenue, accounted for 73.4% of total revenue. Expenses increased by $89.3M (7.7%) to $1,160.4M, compared to $1,102.4M in 2020–2021. The increase is due mainly to higher expenses for salaries and benefits, scholarships and financial aid, and additional costs stemming from COVID-19. As stated in the 2021-2022 financial results, its endowment was valued at CA$321.3 million, a $17.5M decrease in endowments compared to the year before due to the reduced market value of investments.

The university was registered as an educational charitable organization in Canada on January 1, 1967. As of 2015, the university was registered primarily as a post-secondary institution. The university's Institutional Research and Planning department estimated that its students, staff, visitors and the institution itself brought in an estimated total of CA$4.12 billion into the local economy in 2011.

=== Court Challenges Program ===
Since 2018, the University of Ottawa has been hosting the administration of the modernized Court Challenges Program (CCP) whose decisions are made by experts in human rights and language rights which are independent from both the university and the government. The Department of Canadian Heritage, in collaboration with the Department of Justice, chose the University of Ottawa as the independent organization responsible for implementing and managing the new CCP. The CCP is an administrative unit integrated within the Official Languages and Bilingualism Institute (OLBI) of the Faculty of Arts of the University of Ottawa. In selecting a third-party institution to host the CCP, the Government is ensuring that the Program will operate independently to advance the rights and freedoms of all Canadians.

== Academics ==
The University of Ottawa is a research university and a member of the Association of Universities and Colleges of Canada. It functions on a semester system, operating fall/winter and spring/summer sessions. Undergraduate programs comprise the majority of the school's enrolment, with 39,770 full-time and part-time undergraduate students, compared to 8,128 graduate students in fall 2022. Excluding Saint Paul, the university conferred 7,449 bachelor's and professional degrees, 208 doctoral degrees, 1,815 master's degrees in 2015.

The university also offers students the opportunity to earn credits while studying abroad, through student exchange programs, and summer programs. The university has exchange agreements with over 250 institutions in over 52 countries.

=== Bilingualism and biculturalism ===
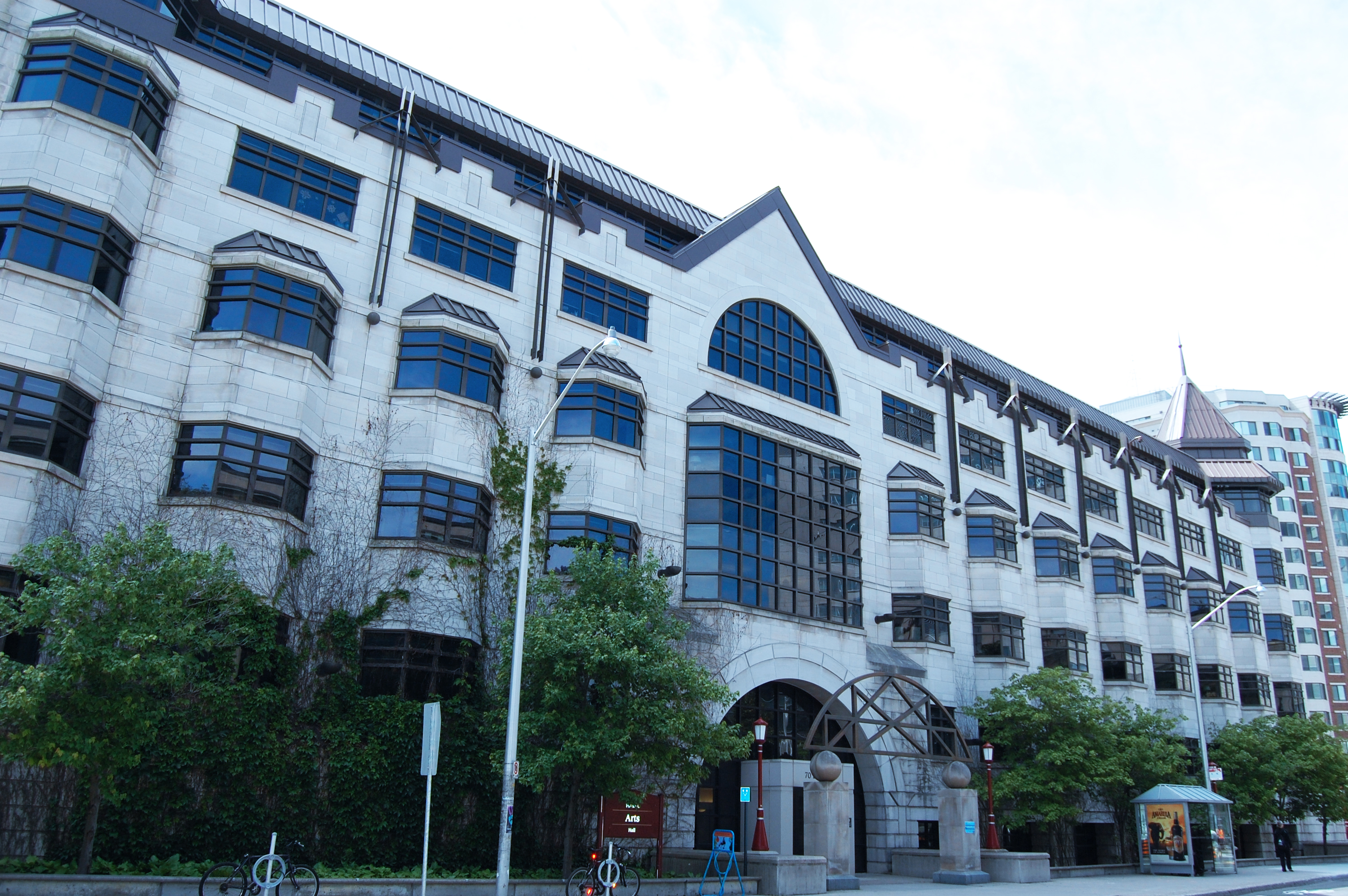
The Official Languages and Bilingualism Institute, a language institute affiliated with the university, is housed at Hamelin Hall.

As of 2016, the university was the world's largest English-French bilingual university. The university is one of the three bilingual universities in Ontario that is not federated with a larger university. Since its inception the university has seen itself as fostering English-French bilingualism. However, bilingualism was only made an official university policy in 1965 when the Government of Ontario passed An Act respecting Université d'Ottawa through the Legislative Assembly of Ontario. Section 4 of that Act specifically states that an object and purpose of the university is "to further bilingualism and biculturalism and to preserve and develop French culture in Ontario", and "to further ... Christian principles". Despite that law, these parts of the university's mandate are now arguably superseded by the 1982 Canadian Charter of Rights and Freedoms, which constitutionalizes multiculturalism (not biculturalism) and freedom of religion.

The university operates the Official Languages and Bilingualism Institute (OLBI). The OLBI was officially opened on July 1, 2007, replacing its predecessor, the Second Language Institute. Both institutes promoted English-French bilingualism, although the OLBI holds an expanded mandate, to strengthen research, innovation and outreach efforts in official languages and bilingualism. The university is a member of the Association of Universities of the Canadian Francophonie, an association which promotes post-secondary education and research in French.

While the university maintains bilingualism as an official policy, students need not be bilingual. Instead, most courses and programs are offered in both languages. As of April 2023, the percentage of students who used French as their primary language of education was at 30 per cent (14,218 students), while the number of students which use English as their primary language for education was 70 per cent (33,680 students). As of March 2009, 68.6 per cent of professors in bilingual positions were considered to be actively bilingual, while bilingual staff comprised 91.5 per cent.

=== Co-operative education ===
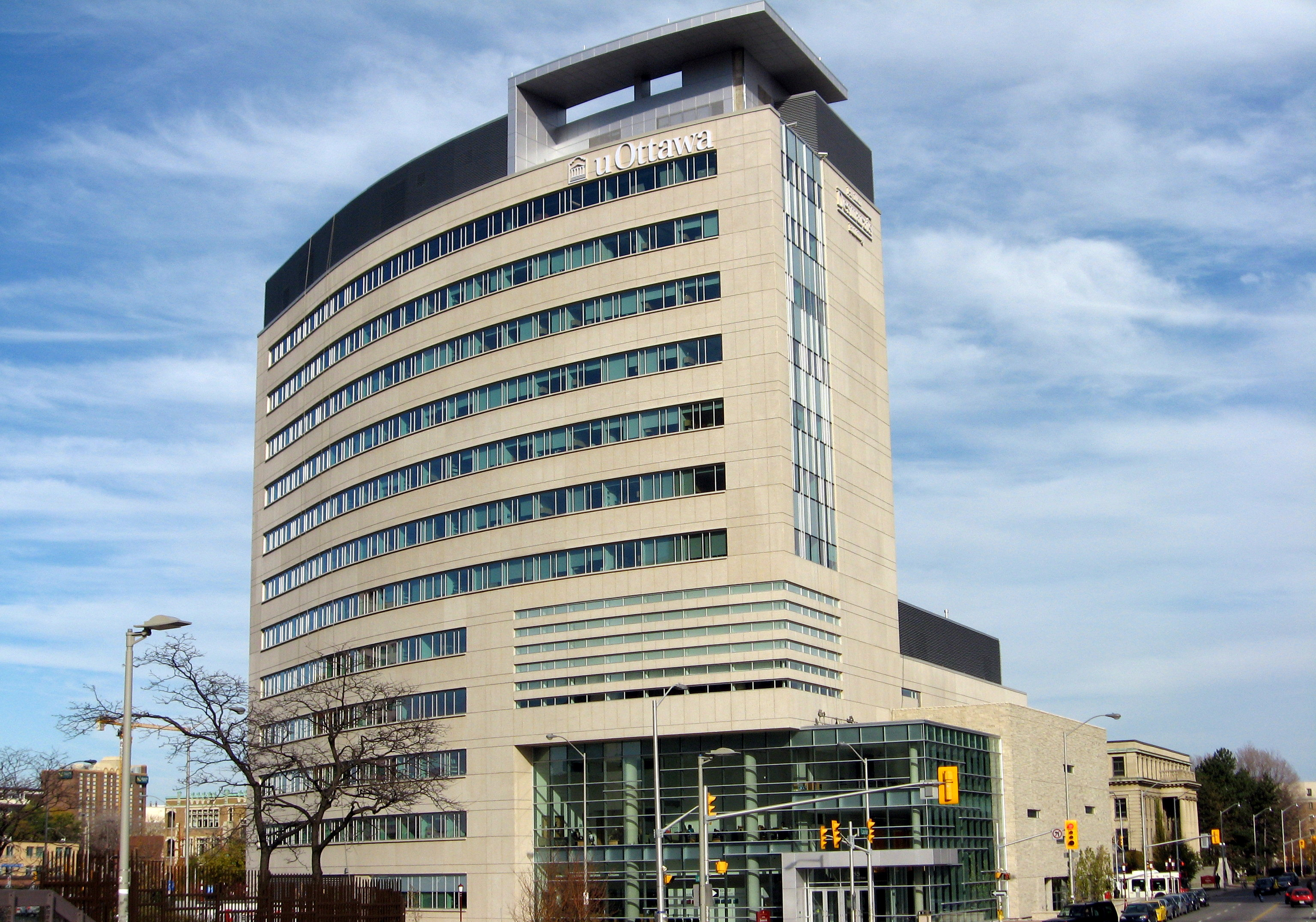
The Desmarais Building houses several departments and the university's co-operative education program.

The University of Ottawa's cooperative education program is an optional program which presents students with the ability to take part in paid work placements as part of their academic program. The program is offered for both undergraduate programs and certain graduate programs. The program was first introduced to the school in 1980. The University of Ottawa's co-operative program has expanded since its creation and now stands as the second largest program in Ontario with a placement success rate of over 98 per cent. The co-operative education program is designed to have students alternate between work and study terms, being placed in fields relevant to their area of study. The university's co-op program is available for a wide range of programs for undergraduate students and can be offered in French or English, depending on the program. Various programs offered in the faculties of arts, social sciences, engineering, science and law. The option of completing a work term abroad is also available.

=== Rankings and reputation ===
University rankings

World rankings
- ARWU World: 201–300
- QS World: =219
- THE World: =191
- USNWR World: =218
- 9–12

Canadian rankings
- QS National: 9
- THE National: 8
- USNWR National: 9
- Maclean's Medical/Doctoral: 5
- Maclean's Reputation: 17

The University of Ottawa has ranked in a number of university rankings. In the 2024 Academic Ranking of World Universities rankings, the university placed 9–12 in Canada. The 2025 QS World University Rankings ranked the university ninth in Canada. The 2025 Times Higher Education World University Rankings placed Ottawa eighth in Canada. In the 2024–25 U.S. News & World Report Best Global University Ranking, the university placed ninth in Canada. In terms of national rankings, Maclean's ranked the university fifth in their 2025 Medical Doctoral university rankings. Ottawa was ranked in spite of having opted out – along with several other universities in Canada – of participating in Maclean's graduate survey since 2006.

The university has also placed in a number of rankings that evaluated the employment prospects of its graduates. The university has an average graduate employment rate of 97 per cent, providing a significant educational, research, and economic benefit to the National Capital Region.

=== Research ===
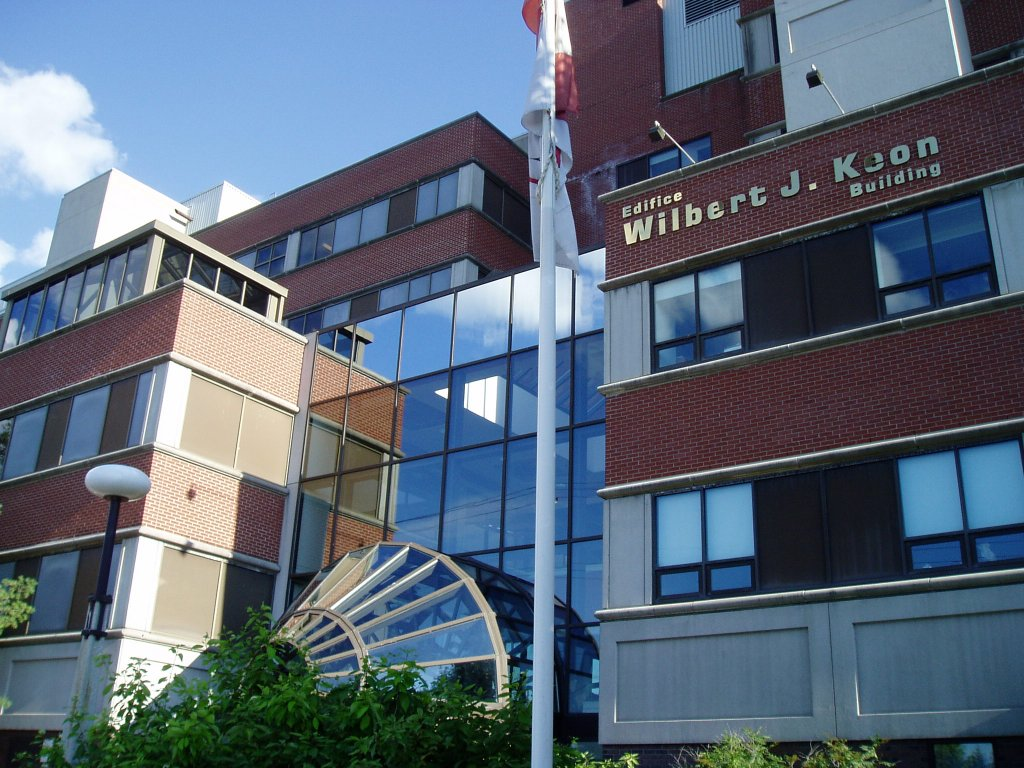
The University of Ottawa Heart Institute at the Wilbert Keon Building, houses over 60 principal investigators and 175 researchers for cardiovascular medicine.

The university is a member of the U15, a group of research-intensive universities in Canada. Research at the University of Ottawa is managed through the Office of the Vice-President, Research. The university operates 40 research centres and institutes including the André E. Lalonde Accelerator Mass Spectrometry Laboratory, the Centre for Research in Photonics at the University of Ottawa, the Centre for Research on Educational and Community Services, the Institute for Science, Society and Policy, the Ottawa Health Research Institute and the University of Ottawa Heart Institute. In 2018, Research Infosource ranked Ottawa 9th on their list for top 50 research universities in Canada, with a sponsored research income (external sources of funding) of $324.581 million in 2017. In the same year, the university's faculty averaged a sponsored research income of $246,800, while its graduate students averaged a sponsored research income of $47,000. The largest source of research funding comes from the federal government, which provided $142.8 million in 2010. This was followed by the provincial government, which provided $31.2 million and the corporate/private sector which provides $25.8 million in research funding.

The university's research performance has been noted several bibliometric university rankings, which uses citation analysis to evaluates the impact a university has on academic publications. In 2019, the Performance Ranking of Scientific Papers for World Universities ranked Ottawa 147th in the world, and eighth in Canada. The University Ranking by Academic Performance 2018–19 rankings placed the university 152nd in the world, and eighth in Canada.

The University of Ottawa Press is an academic publishing house that publishes monographs and research journals in the university's name.

=== Admission ===
Admission requirements differ between students from Ontario, other provinces in Canada and international students, due to the lack of uniformity in marking schemes. The admissions office maintains that an admission rate of at least 73 per cent is required, although the rate may increase based on the popularity of a program. In 2018, the secondary school average for admitted applicants to the university was 85.1 per cent. The 2015 acceptance (registrant) rate of first choice student is 45.6 per cent. The 2010 secondary school rate for full-time first-year students, including Saint Paul was 82.1 per cent. The retention rate for first-time, full-time first year students in 2009 was 86.1 per cent.

Students may apply for financial aid such as the Ontario Student Assistance Program and Canada Student Loans and Grants through the federal and provincial governments. Aid may come in the form of loans, grants, bursaries, scholarships, fellowships, debt reduction, interest relief and work programs. In 2011–2012, the university provided $71.458 million in financial aid and scholarships.

== Student life ==
Demographics of student body (2017–18) (Note: The following includes both full-time, and part-time students.)
	Undergraduate (Note: The following includes both undergraduates and students enrolled in a first professional degree program.)	Graduate
Male	40.6%	44.4%
Female	59.4%	55.6%
Canadian student	88.6%	72.6%
International student	11.4%	27.4%

The two main student unions on administrative and policy issues are the University of Ottawa Students' Union (UOSU) for all undergraduate students and the Graduate Students' Association (GSAÉD) for graduate students. Additionally, graduate (and undergraduate) students who are employed as research assistants, teaching assistants, markers, proctors, residence life workers, and lifeguards are members of CUPE2626, a local chapter of the Canadian Union of Public Employees. The union and the university are bound by a collective agreement.

Until December 2018, the Student Federation of the University of Ottawa acted as the undergraduate student union, until it lost its official status, after their agreement was terminated with the university. The university cited the SFUO's handling of allegations of financial mismanagement, fraud, and workplace misconduct as the reason. In 2019, students voted to choose a new undergraduate student association in a referendum. On February 11, 2019, the University of Ottawa announced the results of the student referendum. The University of Ottawa announced the University of Ottawa Students' Union (UOSU) had been selected as the new student union to represent undergraduate students. The university will make its best efforts to have a new agreement in place by May 1, 2019.

In addition, most faculties have student representative bodies. Resident students are represented by the Residents' Association of the University of Ottawa. More than 175 student organizations and clubs are officially accredited by the student union, covering interests such as academics, culture, religion, social issues and recreation. Many of them centre on the student activity centre. Two non-profit, independent student newspapers publish at the university. The Fulcrum publishes in English and is a member of the Canadian University Press, while La Rotonde publishes in French. Campus radio station CHUO-FM (89.1 FM), Canada's second-oldest, began broadcasting in 1984.

=== Athletics ===
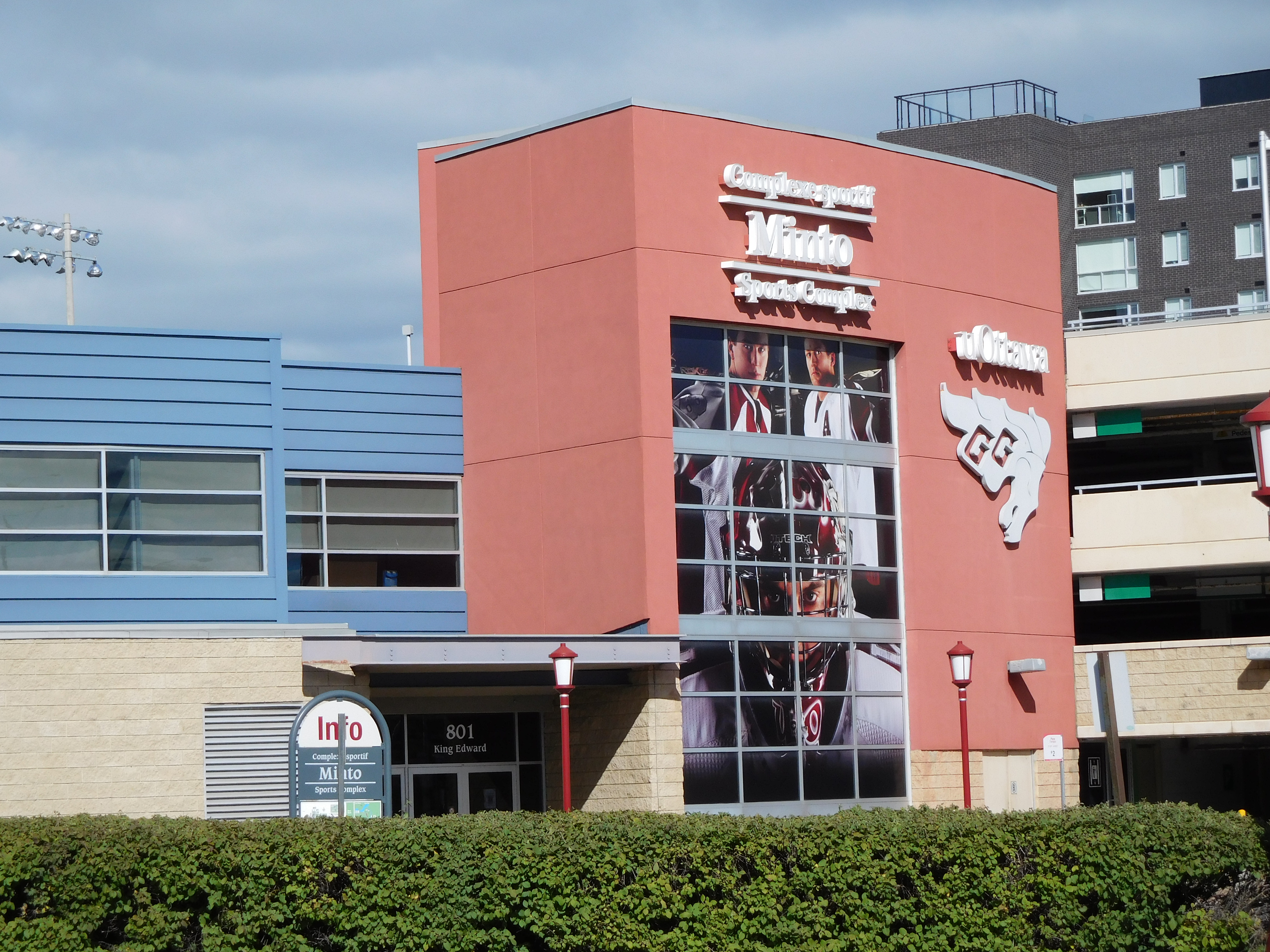
The Minto Sports Complex is one of three athletic facilities operated by the university. The facility is used by the student body, as well as by the university's varsity team.

Athletics and student recreation at the university are managed by Sports Services. Varsity teams compete in either Ontario University Athletics or Réseau du sport étudiant du Québec conference of U Sports, varying by team. The university hosts 29 competitive clubs, including 10 varsity. The first athletic group at the university was formed in 1885, with garnet and grey becoming the official team colours. Shortly thereafter, garnet and grey became the official colours of the university. Varsity teams' names are a play on the initials of the colours. Varsity teams did not immediately adopt a name, leading others to refer to them by their colours–"Garnet and Grey" in English, Grenat et Gris in French. Ottawa sports media referred to the teams as "GG" for the teams, a nickname that could easily be used in both English and French. Eventually the shorthand became official. Because the term gee gee also describes the lead horse in a race, the horse became UOttawa's mascot. The university's varsity teams share a rivalry with the Carleton Ravens, who both compete in the Capital Hoops Classic basketball game, and the Colonel By Classic ice hockey game, and the Canadian football Panda Game.

The university owns and operates three athletic facilities on the university's two campuses. Montpetit Hall and Minto Sports Complex are located on the main campus and another is located on Lees.

Montpetit is centrally located on campus and is the home to the varsity basketball and swimming teams. The Minto Sports Complex houses the university's two arena ice rinks, which seat 840 as well as Matt Anthony Field the home of Gee-Gees soccer and rugby, which seats 1,500. In 2013, the university opened Gee-Gees Field a new stadium for its varsity football team located at Lees Campus. The new stadium holds over 4,000 spectators and serves as the first on-campus home to the Gee-Gees football team in 120 years. Along with the stadium came all new facilities including: new team rooms, coaches' offices, dedicated athletic therapy and video rooms.

=== uOttaHack ===
uOttaHack is Ottawa's Premier Hackathon, hosted annually by students at the University of Ottawa in Ontario, Canada. First held in February 2018, it was the inaugural Major League Hacking (MLH) hackathon at the university and has since grown into Ottawa's largest and longest-running hackathon. Participants work in teams of up to four for an entire weekend to build hardware and software projects while attending workshops, network with industry sponsors, and compete for prizes. All meals and swag are provided free of charge, and the hackathon is open to students of all skill levels and fields of study.

== Notable people ==
Graduates have found success in many fields, serving as the heads of diverse institutions in both public and private sectors. As of October 18, 2011, the university has 167,224 alumni. Faculty and graduates have accumulated numerous awards including Governor General's Awards and the Pulitzer Prize for Fiction. Recipients of the Governor General's Award include Michel Bock, Christl Verduyn and Pulitzer Prize winner Carol Shields.

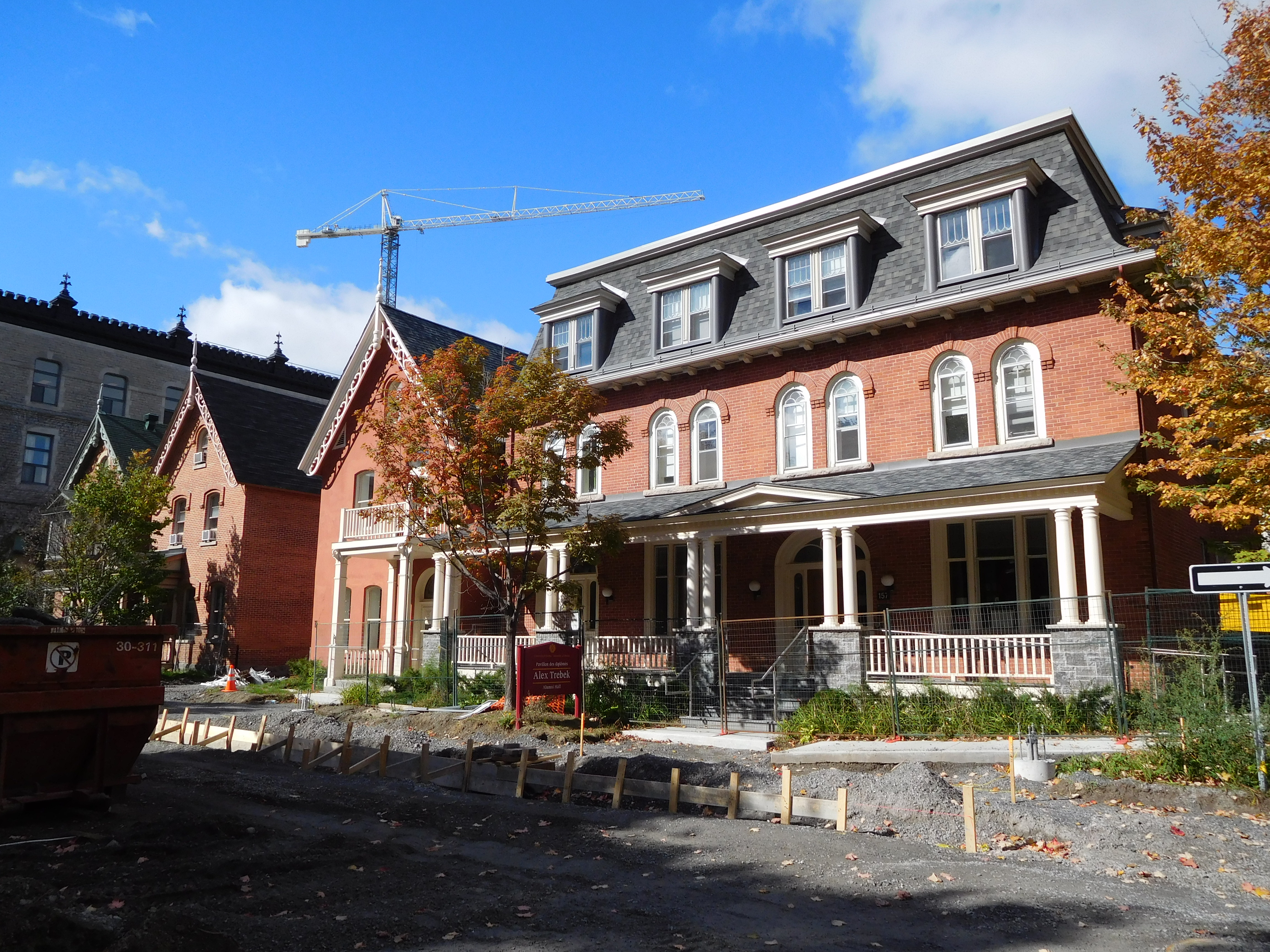
The university's alumni relations office is housed at the Alex Trebek Alumni Hall. The building is named after Alex Trebek, the former host of Jeopardy! who was an alumnus of the university.

Several Chancellors of the university had previously held positions such as Governor General of Canada, or the Viceregal consort of Canada. Examples include Pauline Vanier, 46th viceregal consort of Canada, Gabrielle Léger, the 48th viceregal consort of Canada, Maurice Sauvé, the 50th viceregal consort of Canada, and Michaëlle Jean, the 27th Governor General of Canada. A number of alumni have also gained prominence serving in government. Four heads of government attended the university: Edward Morris, 1st Baron Morris, the 2nd Premier of Newfoundland, Paul Martin, the 24th Prime Minister of Canada, Philémon Yang, the eighth Prime Minister of Cameroon, and Abdiweli Sheikh Ahmed, the 17th Prime Minister of Somalia. The 36th Argentine Vice President, Gabriela Michetti had also taken career specialization courses at the university. Premiers include Paul Okalik, 1st Premier of Nunavut, and Dalton McGuinty, 24th Premier of Ontario. Six graduates have been appointed Puisne Justices, with one moving on to become a Chief Justice of Canada. Puisne justices include Louise Arbour, Michel Bastarache, Louise Charron, Louis LeBel, Richard Wagner and Gérald Fauteux. Fauteux and Wagner would later become a Chief Justice of Canada and Arbour would later serve as United Nations High Commissioner for Human Rights and Governor General of Canada.

Prominent business leaders include Daniel Lamarre, former president and CEO of Cirque du Soleil, Paul Desmarais, chairman of the Power Corporation of Canada, André Desmarais, president and CEO of the Power Corporation of Canada, Calin Rovinescu, president and CEO of Air Canada, and André Ouellet, Postmaster General of Canada, CEO and president of Canada Post. Alex Trebek, host of the game show Jeopardy!, after whom a building was named on the university campus. Philipe Falardeau, notable film director and screenwriter. Cathleen Crudden, professor of chemistry. Dafydd Williams, an astronaut for the Canadian Space Agency was also a graduate of the university's medical school.

== Arms ==
Coat of arms of University of Ottawa
Notes Granted June 5, 1990 Crest A circlet of trillium flowers Proper alternating with fleurs-de-lys Azure a classical temple front of six columns Proper the pediment bearing an antique lamp enflamed Or. Escutcheon Gules semé of escutcheons Argent on a fess also Argent two open books Proper edged Or bound Gules the dexter displaying a rose the sinister a fleur-de-lys Gules. Supporters Two horses Argent crined and hoofed Or gorged with a collar wavy Azure the whole set upon a grassy mound Vert charged with a maple leaf Or between a bend reversed and a bend both wavy Argent each charged with a like bendlet Azure. Motto Deus Scientiarum Dominus Est (God Is The Master of the Sciences)

== See also ==
- Canadian Internet Policy and Public Interest Clinic
- Controversy over academic freedom at the University of Ottawa
- Higher education in Ontario
- List of Canadian universities by endowment
- List of schools in Ottawa
- List of universities in Ontario
- Racism controversies at the University of Ottawa
- Revue générale de droit
