= Racism controversies at the University of Ottawa =

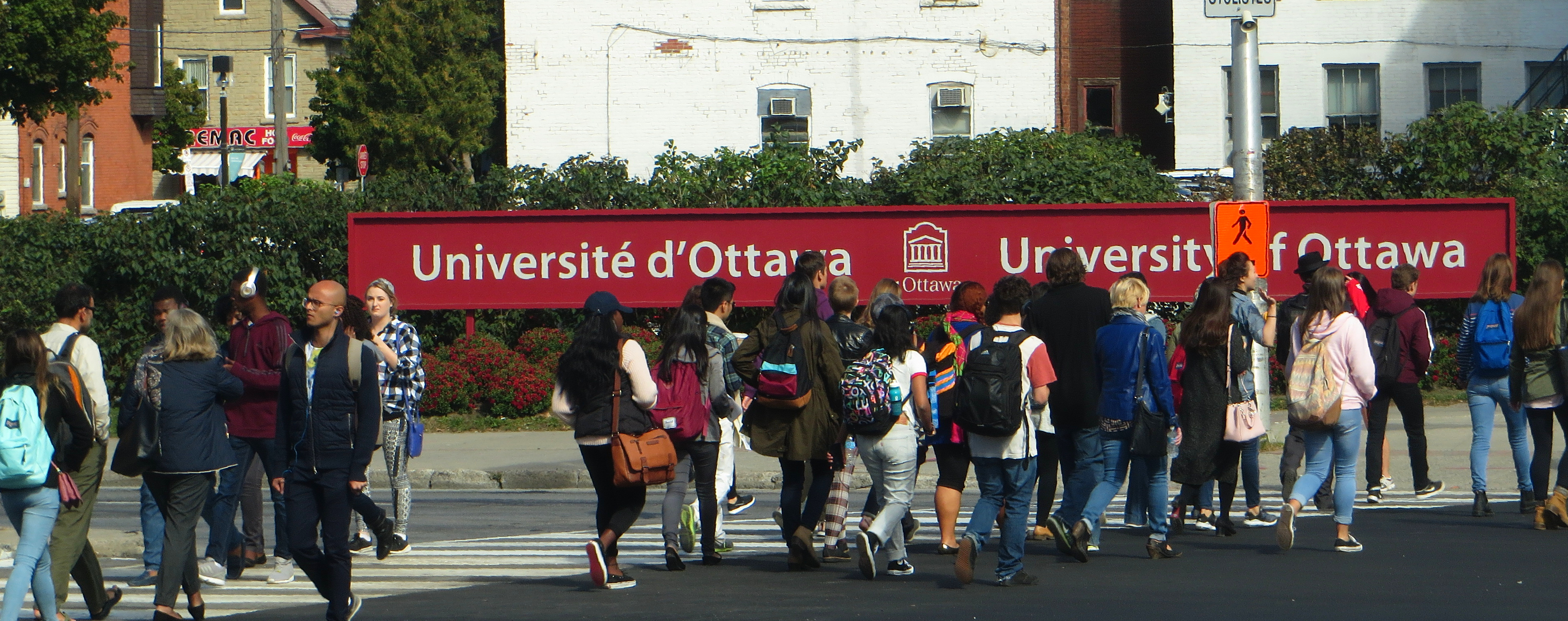
Students walking on campus at the university

Several incidents of alleged racism have occurred at the University of Ottawa, located in Ottawa, Ontario, Canada. Some students and staff members have labelled these incidents as racism.

== Black student handcuffed on campus ==
In mid-June 2019, a Black male student was carded and detained for two hours, who was later identified as Jamal Boyce, the vice president of the student's association in his program.

Reports state that Boyce was skateboarding when campus security stopped him and demanded his identification. When he was unable to provide any, they arrested him.

== Racist comments made during an online class ==
In September 2020, students noted that racist slurs were used during a virtual class. At the time, the majority of classes were offered virtually due to the rising number of COVID-19 cases in Canada and in Ottawa.

The incident occurred without a professor present. Dean Adam Dodek stated that the academia, including the University of Ottawa's law school, had a long history of systemic discriminatory practices.

== Racial epithet used in class ==
In October 2020, a part-time University of Ottawa professor, Verushka Lieutenant-Duval, was suspended after she used the word nigger in one of her lectures. A student who attended this lecture filed a complaint to the University of Ottawa's president, Jacques Frémont, and demanded an immediate assessment of the situation. Other students present in the class also supported this complaint. The students from various faculties at the university supported demands for punitive action as the news of the incident made its way to the headlines. In response to the incident, 34 professors at the university signed a letter supporting Lieutenant-Duval.

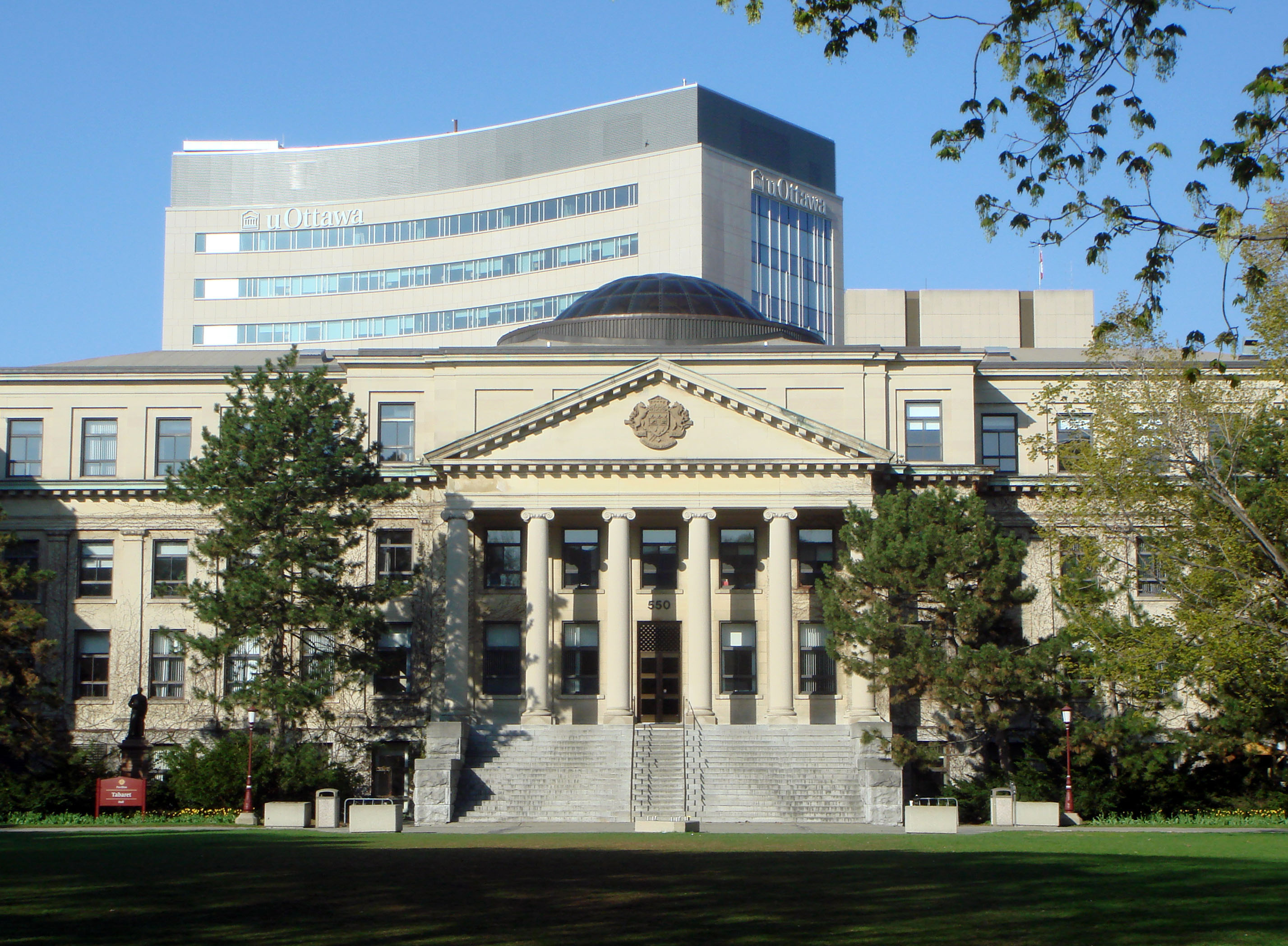
Photo of Tabaret Hall with the Desmarais Building in the background, on the University of Ottawa campus.
