= Capital Hoops Classic =

Basketball series

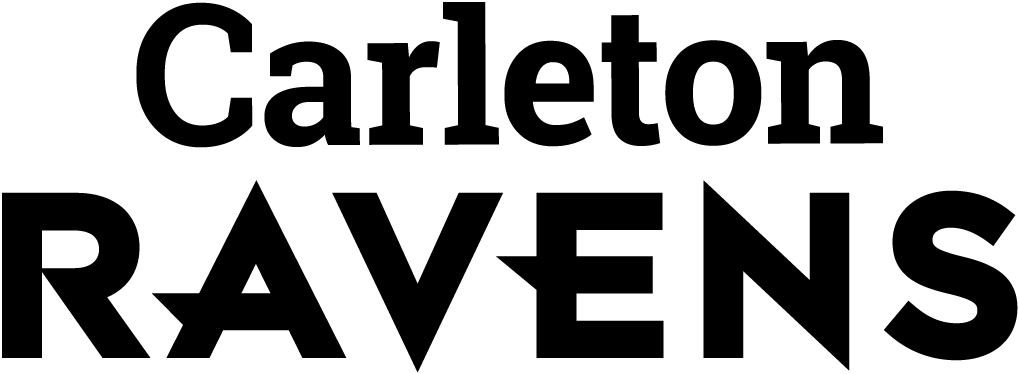
- Ottawa Carleton
- Sport: Basketball
- First meeting: Men's: January 23, 2007; Ottawa 64 Carleton 62; Women's: January 26, 2008; Carleton 53 Ottawa 43
- Latest meeting: February 6, 2026; Men's: Ottawa 73, Carleton 52; Women's: Carleton 87, Ottawa 60
- Next meeting: December 4, 2026

Statistics
- Total meetings: Men's: 19; Women's: 18
- All-time series: Men's: Carleton leads, 13–6; Women's: Carleton leads, 13–5
- Largest victory: Men's: Carleton, 74–34 (2012); Women's: Carleton, 73–50 (2016)
- Longest win streak: Carleton (Men's), 8 (2008–2015); Carleton (Women's), 5 (2022–2026)
- Current win streak: Ottawa (Men's), 3 (2024–2026); Carleton (Women's), 5 (2022–2026)

The Capital Hoops Classic is a Canadian rivalry basketball series between the University of Ottawa Gee-Gees and Carleton University Ravens. The series, featuring both the men's and women's teams, was held at the Canadian Tire Centre (known until 2013 as Scotiabank Place) from 2007 to 2019 until moving to TD Place Arena in 2020. Since 2015, the games traditionally occur on the first Friday in February.

Both schools are located in the city of Ottawa; Ottawa is older of the two and is located in the downtown Sandy Hill neighbourhood of the city, while Carleton sits between Old Ottawa South and Dow's Lake. Both teams compete in the East division of Ontario University Athletics in U Sports, and frequently finish near the top of the league table.

== History ==
On January 23, 2007, the two men's basketball teams faced off at Scotiabank Place in front of nearly 9,720 spectators, which was a record crowd for a regular season basketball game in U Sports (then known as Canadian Interuniversity Sport). The Ottawa Gee-Gees won the inaugural event 64–62. This event, now known as the Capital Hoops Classic, has been expanded to include the women's teams as well, with the Classic featuring a doubleheader of both teams.

The January 28, 2009 edition of the game broke the 2007 record with 10,523 fans attending the two games, with both of Carleton's teams posting victories over Ottawa.

In the 2013–14 season the teams faced each other both in the provincial and national finals, with Ottawa winning the OUA championship and Carleton winning the national title.

The 2015 matchup set a new record attendance at 10,780 and was the first time in the series where the Gee-Gees Men's team were the top-ranked team in the CIS, with the Ravens holding second. The Gee-Gees defeated the Ravens in an earlier game; the inaugural "Bytown Battle" which took place at the U of O's Montpetit Hall. However, while their women won 46–40, the Gee-Gees men were unable to defeat the Ravens in the rivalry series, falling 79–66.

The 2021 edition of the games were not played, and the 2022 games were played at Carleton University, due to the COVID-19 pandemic. In 2023, the games returned to TD Place.

== Game results ==
=== Men's ===
Season	Date	Winning team		Losing team		Series	Venue	Attendance	Notes
2006–07	Jan 23, 2007	Ottawa	64	Carleton	62	OTT 1–0	Scotiabank Place	9,730	Inaugural edition
2007–08	Jan 26, 2008	Carleton	70	Ottawa	66	TIED 1–1	Scotiabank Place	9,124	
2008–09	Jan 28, 2009	Carleton	87	Ottawa	72	CAR 2–1	Scotiabank Place	10,523	
2009–10	Jan 27, 2010	Carleton	77	Ottawa	66	CAR 3–1	Scotiabank Place	8,074	
2010–11	Jan 26, 2011	Carleton	78	Ottawa	65	CAR 4–1	Scotiabank Place	7,565	
2011–12	Jan 18, 2012	Carleton	74	Ottawa	34	CAR 5–1	Scotiabank Place	7,022	Largest margin of victory
2012–13	Jan 23, 2013	Carleton	63	Ottawa	58	CAR 6–1	Scotiabank Place	6,208	
2013–14	Jan 21, 2014	Carleton	82	Ottawa	58	CAR 7–1	Canadian Tire Centre	6,604	
2014–15	Feb 6, 2015	Carleton	79	Ottawa	66	CAR 8–1	Canadian Tire Centre	10,780	Highest attendance record
2015–16	Feb 5, 2016	Ottawa	78	Carleton	72	CAR 8–2	Canadian Tire Centre	10,105	
2016–17	Feb 3, 2017	Carleton	74	Ottawa	61	CAR 9–2	Canadian Tire Centre	10,030	
2017–18	Feb 2, 2018	Carleton	67	Ottawa	56	CAR 10–2	Canadian Tire Centre	8,579	
2018–19	Feb 1, 2019	Carleton	82	Ottawa	64	CAR 11–2	Canadian Tire Centre	9,004	
2019–20	Feb 7, 2020	Ottawa	68	Carleton	67	CAR 11–3	TD Place	8,103	
2021–22	Feb 18, 2022	Carleton	71	Ottawa	58	CAR 12–3	Raven's Nest		Restricted attendance due to COVID-19 regulations
2022–23	Feb 3, 2023	Carleton	67	Ottawa	61	CAR 13–3	TD Place	7,029	
2023–24	Feb 2, 2024	Ottawa	71	Carleton	61	CAR 13–4	TD Place	6,137	
2024–25	Feb 7, 2025	Ottawa	79	Carleton	66	CAR 13–5	TD Place	7,048	
2025–26	Feb 6, 2026	Ottawa	73	Carleton	52	CAR 13–6	TD Place	6,100	

=== Women's ===
Season	Date	Winning team		Losing team		Series	Venue	Attendance	Notes
2007–08	Jan 26, 2008	Carleton	53	Ottawa	43	CAR 1–0	Scotiabank Place	9,124	Inaugural edition
2008–09	Jan 28, 2009	Carleton	62	Ottawa	53	CAR 2–0	Scotiabank Place	10,523	
2009–10	Jan 27, 2010	Carleton	53	Ottawa	40	CAR 3–0	Scotiabank Place	8,074	
2010–11	Jan 26, 2011	Carleton	71	Ottawa	63	CAR 4–0	Scotiabank Place	7,565	
2011–12	Jan 18, 2012	Ottawa	59	Carleton	55	CAR 4–1	Scotiabank Place	7,022	
2012–13	Jan 23, 2013	Carleton	68	Ottawa	50	CAR 5–1	Scotiabank Place	6,208	
2013–14	Jan 21, 2014	Ottawa	57	Carleton	47	CAR 5–2	Canadian Tire Centre	6,604	
2014–15	Feb 6, 2015	Ottawa	46	Carleton	40	CAR 5–3	Canadian Tire Centre	10,780	Highest attendance record
2015–16	Feb 5, 2016	Carleton	73	Ottawa	50	CAR 6–3	Canadian Tire Centre	10,105	Largest margin of victory
2016–17	Feb 3, 2017	Carleton	57	Ottawa	44	CAR 7–3	Canadian Tire Centre	10,030	
2017–18	Feb 2, 2018	Carleton	57	Ottawa	41	CAR 8–3	Canadian Tire Centre	8,579	
2018–19	Feb 1, 2019	Ottawa	61	Carleton	52	CAR 8–4	Canadian Tire Centre	9,004	
2019–20	Feb 7, 2020	Ottawa	77	Carleton	75	CAR 8-5	TD Place	8,103	
2021–22	Feb 18, 2022	Carleton	63	Ottawa	43	CAR 9–5	Raven's Nest		Restricted attendance due to COVID-19 regulations
2022–23	Feb 3, 2023	Carleton	66	Ottawa	60	CAR 10–5	TD Place	7,029	
2023–24	Feb 2, 2024	Carleton	78	Ottawa	72	CAR 11–5	TD Place	6,137	
2024–25	Feb 7, 2025	Carleton	58	Ottawa	54	CAR 12–5	TD Place	7,048	
2025–26	Feb 6, 2026	Carleton	87	Ottawa	60	CAR 13–5	TD Place	6,100	

== See also ==
- Panda Game
- Colonel By Classic
