= Colonel By Classic =

Game of Canadian hockey

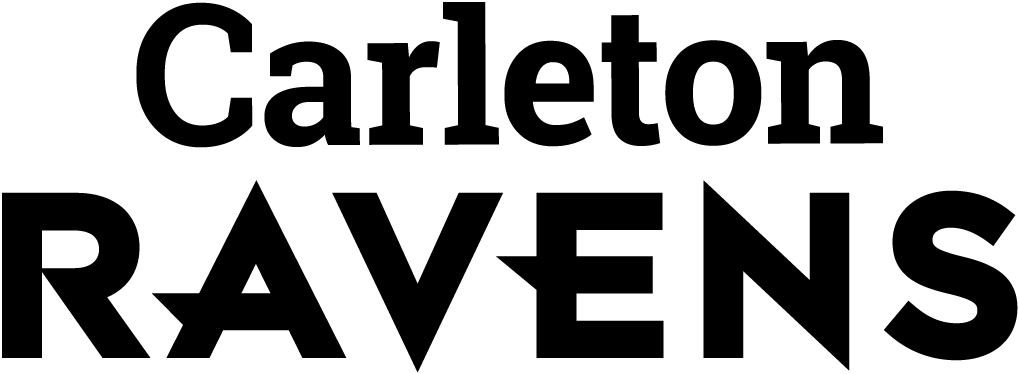
- Ottawa Gee-Gees Carleton Ravens
- Sport: Hockey
- First meeting: October 19, 2016; Carleton 6, Ottawa 2
- Latest meeting: November 29, 2025; Men: Ottawa 6, Carleton 4 Women: Ottawa 4, Carleton 1
- Next meeting: TBD
- Stadiums: Men: TD Place Arena; Women: TD Place Arena, Minto Sports Complex, Carleton Ice House

Statistics
- Total meetings: Men: 8 Women: 6
- All-time series: Men: Carleton leads, 5–3; Women: Ottawa leads, 5–1
- Largest victory: Men: Carleton, 6–2; Women: Carleton, 5–2 ; Ottawa 4-1 (3 occasions)
- Current win streak: Men: Ottawa, 1 (2025); Women: Ottawa, 5 (2019–present)

The Colonel By Classic is a Canadian rivalry hockey game between the University of Ottawa Gee-Gees and the Carleton University Ravens. The game has been held between men's teams since 2016, with a women's game added in 2018. Both men's and women's teams compete in the Ontario University Athletics Conference. The series is the newest of three annual rivalry series between the two schools, both located in the city of Ottawa.

== History ==
The first Colonel By Classic was held on October 19, 2016, between the two men's hockey teams in front of at TD Place Arena. This was Gee-Gees first season back in OUA competition. Carleton won the game 6–2. Attendance has gone up each year the event has been held, with 2,286 and 2,578 in attendance for the 2017 and 2018 men's games respectively.

A women's game was added to the event for the 2018 edition. Carleton won the inaugural women's game 5–2 at the University of Ottawa's Minto Sports Complex. The 2019 edition was held at the Carleton Ice House.

== Game results ==
=== Men ===
Season	Site	Winning team		Losing team		Series	Attendance	Notes
2016–17	TD Place Arena	Carleton	6	Ottawa	2	CAR 1–0	800	Inaugural game; largest margin of victory
2017–18	TD Place Arena	Ottawa	4	Carleton	3	TIED 1–1	2,268	
2018–19	TD Place Arena	Carleton	4	Ottawa	3	CAR 2–1	2,578	
2019–20	TD Place Arena	Carleton	4	Ottawa	2	CAR 3–1	2,681	Highest attendance record
2020–21	Cancelled due to the COVID-19 pandemic							
2021–22	Cancelled due to the COVID-19 pandemic							
2022–23	TD Place Arena	Carleton	8	Ottawa	7	CAR 4–1	1,700	
2023–24	TD Place Arena	Ottawa	3	Carleton	1	CAR 4–2	1,517	
2024–25	TD Place Arena	Carleton	5	Ottawa	4	CAR 5–2	678	
2025–26	TD Place Arena	Ottawa	6	Carleton	4	CAR 5–3	1,657	

=== Women ===
Season	Site	Winning team		Losing team		Series	Attendance	Notes
2018–19	Minto Sports Complex	Carleton	5	Ottawa	2	CAR 1–0	120	Inaugural women's game
2019–20	Carleton Ice House	Ottawa	4	Carleton	1	Tied 1–1	197	
2020–21	Cancelled due to the COVID-19 pandemic							
2021–22	Cancelled due to the COVID-19 pandemic							
2022–23	TD Place Arena	Ottawa	4	Carleton	3	OTT 2–1	1,000	
2023–24	TD Place Arena	Ottawa	2	Carleton	1	OTT 3–1	587	
2024–25	TD Place Arena	Ottawa	4	Carleton	1	OTT 4–1	450	
2025–26	TD Place Arena	Ottawa	4	Carleton	1	OTT 5–1	768	

== See also ==
- Capital Hoops Classic
- Panda Game
