= Association for the Advancement of Sustainability in Higher Education =

American nonprofit association

AASHE
- Association for the Advancement of Sustainability in Higher Education
- Formation: 2005; 21 years ago
- Founded at: Portland, Oregon
- Headquarters: 2401 Walnut Street, Suite 102 Philadelphia, PA 19103
- Location: United States
- Executive Director: Meghan Fay Zahniser
- Director of Finance & Administration: Allison Jones
- Website: aashe.org

The Association for the Advancement of Sustainability in Higher Education (AASHE, pronounced AY-shee) is a 501(c)(3) association of higher education institutions headquartered in Philadelphia. The association aims to improve sustainable practices in higher education by advocacy of sustainable innovation. AASHE encourages people involved in education to promote sustainable development to their communities.

AASHE is an official partner of the Sustainable Development Goals program of the United Nations, the U.S. Department of Energy Better Buildings Initiative, the U.S. Green Building Council, and The Princeton Review.

The journal of AASHE is Sustainability and Climate Change, published by Mary Ann Liebert.

== History ==
AASHE was founded in December 2005 in Portland, Oregon. At the time of their founding, they had two staff members, of which Judy Walton was the first executive director.

Their main office is currently located in Philadelphia, though they have also been located in Boston and Denver.

== Conference ==
AASHE organizes an annual Conference, the "AASHE Annual Conference & Expo". It was held in different locations in the United States from 2006 to 2019, with each year having a different theme. The AASHE Conference was re-established in 2022 in a virtual format.

The purpose of the conference is to be a venue for institutions, companies, and educators to collaborate in maximizing the sustainable impact of higher education. The conference is intended to be an opportunity for administrators to connect with companies and other institutions to exchange sustainable ideas and innovations.

== STARS ==
The AASHE STARS (Sustainability Tracking, Assessment & Rating System) program is a way for institutions to be tracked and ranked on their progress in developing sustainable solutions for their communities. An institution can be awarded a Platinum, Bronze, Silver, Gold, or Reporter designation.

The STARS program tracks multiple factors in an institution's overall sustainability, including purchasing of sustainably-sourced products, community outreach, and offerings of sustainability courses. Adherence to any of the factors is self-reported.

=== History ===
The STARS program was founded with the purpose of being a sustainability rating system for higher education campuses to complement existing sustainability plans being implemented by individual institutions.

== Sustainability and Climate Change ==
Sustainability and Climate Change
- Discipline: Sustainability
- Language: English
- Edited by: Madhavi Venkatesan

Publication details
- Former name: Sustainability: The Journal of Record
- History: 2008–present
- Publisher: Mary Ann Liebert, Inc.
- Frequency: Bimonthly

Standard abbreviations
- ISO 4: Sustain. Clim. Change

Indexing
- ISSN: 2692-2924 (print); 2692-2932 (web)

Links
- Journal homepage

Sustainability and Climate Change is the academic journal published by Mary Ann Liebert, Inc, in collaboration with AASHE. It is the society journal of the association.

=== History ===
The first issue, (Volume 1, Issue 1) was published in February 2008. The journal was published as Sustainability: The Journal of Record until Volume 13, Issue 6 (December 2020), after which the next issue in February 2021 was published under the name Sustainability and Climate Change.

=== Indexing ===
The journal is indexed by SCImago Journal Rank, Elsevier, (including Scopus, EMBiology, and GEOBASE), CAB Abstracts, Sustainability Science Abstracts (now ProQuest Environmental Science Collection), and GreenFILE.
