= Centre for Research in Photonics at the University of Ottawa =

Research center in University of Ottawa

The Centre for Research in Photonics (CRPuO) is a research facility at the University of Ottawa in Ottawa, Ontario, Canada. The center was created in 2002 to study photonics. Photonics embraces the science of light, its interaction with matter, and the technology for its generation, manipulation, transmission and detection. Within the CRPuO there are the Solar Cells and Nanostructured Lab (SUNLab) as well as the Photonic Technology Laboratory (PTLab) among others.

As of 2012 the CRPuO was recruiting three more faculty to support the CERC. At the time, the university was constructing a C$55M building (the Advanced Research Centre) to house all the photonics professors and their research groups. The construction was due to complete in 2014.
