= Bottled water ban =

Proposed and enacted prohibitions

Bottled water bans have been proposed and enacted in several municipalities and campuses everywhere over such concerns as resource wastage, transportation emissions, plastic litter, and damage to affected aquifers.

The University of Leeds held a referendum on the sales of bottled water in 2008, becoming the first university in the United Kingdom to ban bottled still water from all their bars, cafes and shops. The small town of Bundanoon, New South Wales (Australia) enacted such a ban in 2009 and was the first town to do so anywhere. In 2009, Washington University in St. Louis became the first university in the United States to ban the sale of plastic, single-use water bottles. In 2013 The University of Vermont (UVM) in Burlington became the first public college in the U.S. to enact such a ban. As of late 2016, 82 high schools, colleges and universities across the world have implemented bottled water bans on their campuses. Municipalities have also banned bottled water from their facilities, such as the city of San Francisco, California.

== Motivation ==
The use of plastics continues to rise due to convenience and affordability, but many are unaware of the environmental and health impacts they are leaving behind.

Plastics are made from fossil fuels. The use of these leaves a large ecological footprint on the environment, not to mention that these plastics do not break down easily, if at all. According to the New Hampshire Department of Environmental Services, a discarded plastic bottle takes 450 years to decompose.

The overuse of plastics results in a dumping of plastics into the oceans at a rate of 8 million tons per year. The piling up of plastics around the world continues to build up and now we are facing issues like the Great Pacific Garbage Patch. Scientists now have estimated that at the rate will continue to dump plastics into our oceans, by 2050 there will be more plastic than fish in our oceans.

Additional to environmental impacts, plastics have been claimed to leave behind chemicals detrimental to human health such as the neurotoxin Bisphenol A (also known as BPA). Other chemicals in plastics have even been linked to cancer. These claims, however, are generally urban legends or vast exaggerations.

For these reasons some governments are interested in banning the use of single-use plastic water bottles in their regions to lower these impacts on the environment and promote sustainability within their boundaries.

== Sub-national bans by country ==
=== Australia ===
In 2009, the New South Wales town of Bundanoon voted to become the first town in the world to outlaw bottled water. Its citizens voluntarily chose to ban bottled water in response to a bottling company's desire to sell water from the town's local aquifer, prohibiting the selling or dispensing of bottled water within the town precinct.

Bundanoon's twelve stores and cafe's as well as events in the town, have removed bottled water from their stock. The town now offers public drinking fountains and filtered water dispensers where people can fill up reusable water bottles and canteens. The reusable empty bottles are sold in place of full bottles in the local stores. The town's ban received media attention from major news outlets.

The decision to ban bottled water was partly due to opposition to a proposed water extraction plant, and partly to concern related to the environmental and health impacts.

=== Canada ===
Many Canadian municipalities have passed bans on municipal properties including: Ajax; Burlington, Cornwall, London, Newmarket, Niagara Falls, Oakville, Oshawa, Peterborough, St. Catharines, Windsor, Waterloo, Nelson, Victoria, Vancouver. These were followed in December 2008, by Toronto, Canada's most populous city. The Toronto City Council approved a water bottle ban to take effect in January 2012. The ban, which affects most of Toronto's parks and park facilities, prohibits the sale and distribution of water bottles in all Civic Centres, City facilities. and parks.

=== United States ===
In June 2007, San Francisco Mayor Gavin Newsom released an executive directive to phase out the usage of water bottles in the city. The directive for San Francisco had strict consequences. If a public event that has more than 100 people is caught distributing water bottles, the event sponsors can pay a fine of up to $500. Many city offices who supported the ban complied quickly with the phase out of water bottles except for the San Francisco Board of Supervisors who spent about $4,387 on water bottles for three years after the ban was put into effect. San Francisco is one of the largest cities in the country to initiate such a ban yet the city did not offer the people a public policy to allow for access to free water. On March 11, 2014, The San Francisco Board of Supervisors passed Ordinance 28-14, which amends its Environment Code to execute a ban on the sale of plastic water bottles that contain less than 21 ounces through the City of San Francisco. With only a 23% recycle rate of the 50 billion plastic bottles used in the U.S., it is no surprise that this ban of plastic bottles was widely accepted by city officials of San Francisco and its citizens.

To maintain easy access to water for its citizens, the City of San Francisco plans on implementing a Drink Tap Program which will install outdoor water bottle refilling stations to ensure the public stays hydrated. Many of these stations will be dispersed throughout the city.

In 2011, New Haven passed a municipal spending ban including bulk bottled water dispensers.

At the Town Meeting of May, 2015, Brookline, Massachusetts passed a by-law prohibiting the spending of Town funds on water in single-use plastic bottles in offices. It will be considering further restrictions based on San Francisco's ordinance. The Town also instituted a requirement that restaurants serve tap water on request including take-out orders.

==== Retail bans ====
Legislation banning the sale of single-serving plastic water bottles passed in Concord, Massachusetts on April 26, 2012, making Concord the first town in the nation to ban single-serving plastic bottles. The passage was largely due to the efforts of 84-year-old Jean Hill. The ban took effect on January 1, 2013. Two previous attempts to ban bottled water in the town had failed.

Polyethylene terephthalate (PET) bottles, which have the number 1 and/or PETE with the recycling symbol on the bottle are no longer allowed to be sold if they are less than or equal to 1 liter (34 ounces) and contain water which is non-sparkling and non-flavored. The sale of water in bottles made of other types of plastic is allowed. Bottles of flavored water, regardless of size, may be sold. The sale of cases of small (<1 liter) bottles of water is prohibited. Bottled water less than or equal to 1 liter in volume may not be sold in vending machines. Bottled water less than or equal to 1 liter in volume may not be sold at civic events including but not limited to sports events, road races, festivals, theater performances and catered events. Water may be offered for free to patrons in any form.

In January 2013 the Health Division of the Town Manager's Office of the Town of Concord began inspections of retail stores, restaurants, and other venues that sell bottled beverages. The Health Division is tasked with ensuring compliance with the bylaw against bottled water sales under 1 liter. If bottled water less than 1 liter is being sold, a written warning is issued. Within one week a re-inspection will occur; if this is failed, a $25 fine is issued as a non-criminal citation. On the third and subsequent inspections, a non-criminal citation with a fine of $50 is issued if bottled water continues to be sold in violation of the bylaw.

There is controversy over this act. The International Bottled Water Association issued a press release stating that: "This ban deprives residents of the option to choose their choice of beverage and visitors, who come to this birthplace of American independence, a basic freedom gifted to them by the actions in this town more than 200 years ago. It will also deprive the town of needed tax revenue and harm local businesses that rely on bottled water sales." The IBWA reinforced this statement in response to the proposed ban on bottled water in the city of San Francisco. It added that restricting access to bottled water will lead consumers to opt for unhealthier bottled options that may involve, "more packaging, more additives (e.g., sugar, caffeine), and greater environmental impacts than bottled water."

Some businesses opposed the ban, saying it restricts freedom of choice and will simply drive bottled water sales out of town.

Other towns near Concord have explored similar bans. Some residents of the Town of Arlington brought one to its Spring Town Meeting of 2013, but it was defeated in a voice vote. However, it was reintroduced in 2022 and it passed and the town became the largest municipality in the state to have a retail bottled water ban.

A high-school student proposed a ban by-law at the Fall 2014 Town Meeting in Framingham, where it was defeated by a vote of 60 to 40. Among those opposing the ban in both communities was the supermarket chain Stop & Shop. Framingham also has a Poland Spring bottling plant, and its owner Nestlé Waters North America opposed the ban as well.

Two towns that border Concord have passed bottled water bans similar to Concord's by-law: Sudbury on May 2, 2017; and Lincoln in March, 2018. Great Barrington in Berkshire county passed one in May, 2018. Some citizens attempted to revoke the law the following August, but failed. Rockport passed a similar ban in 2019.

Other towns outside the Concord and Cape Cod areas passed bans starting in 2018:

- Great Barrington in 2018
- Rockport in 2020
- Hingham passed a municipal and retail ban in May, 2023.

==== Martha's Vineyard, Massachusetts ====
On April 9, 2019, the Town Meeting of West Tisbury, Massachusetts, banned the sale of non-alcoholic carbonated beverages in single-serve plastic bottles (defined as less than 34 ounces) starting January 1, 2020. This is apparently the first such law in the United States to cover soft drinks and similar beverages. Two neighboring towns on the island, Chilmark and Aquinnah quickly followed with similar measures. A local campaign, Plastic-Free MV, had succeeded in all six towns on the island by March, 2022.

==== Cape Cod, Massachusetts ====
In January 2019, Sustainable Practices, a Cape Cod-based environmental nonprofit established by Madhavi Venkatesan, initiated a regional campaign (Cape Plastic Bottle Ban) with the Municipal Plastic Bottle Ban. The goal of the Municipal Plastic Bottle Ban was to eliminate municipal purchase of single-use plastic bottles and the sale of beverages in single-use plastic containers on municipal property. Citizen Petitions were filed for town adoption of the Municipal Plastic Bottle Ban by-law in the towns of: Brewster, Chatham, Dennis, Harwich, Orleans, Sandwich and Yarmouth and two petitions were submitted through the town Recycling Committees of Provincetown and Wellfleet. The Municipal Plastic Bottle Ban by-law was adopted in Chatham, Harwich, Orleans, and Wellfleet on their respective town meeting floors and passed unanimously with the exception of Harwich, which passed by a margin of 57 votes. Provincetown's Select Board adopted the Municipal Plastic Bottle Ban as policy. Of the remaining towns: Brewster, Sandwich and Yarmouth postponed the vote, while Dennis failed to pass by 24 votes.

Members of Sustainable Practices refiled Citizen's Petitions in the towns of Brewster, Yarmouth and Sandwich in the fall of 2019 and filed a Citizen's Petition in Falmouth. In Dennis, the organization worked through the town Recycling Committees and in Eastham directly with the town to have the Municipal Plastic Bottle Ban adopted as a policy. As of November 21, 2019 the Municipal Plastic Bottle Ban was adopted in the form (bylaw or policy) submitted in all towns that were petitioned: Brewster, Dennis, Eastham, Falmouth, Sandwich, and Yarmouth for an overall adoption of 11 of the 15 towns that comprise Cape Cod. In 2020, the Municipal Plastic Bottle Ban was also submitted as a Citizen's Petition for vote at Town Meeting in the towns of Mashpee and Bourne and through a Board of Selectmen article in the town of Truro. The article was passed in Mashpee and delayed due to the COVID-19 pandemic in Bourne and Truro. As of July 2021, the Municipal Plastic Bottle Ban has been adopted by all Cape towns. Bourne Town Meeting passed it in May, 2021 and Truro passed the Municipal Ban in June 2021.

The goal of the Cape Plastic Bottle Ban is to have a uniform policy on single-use plastic bottles across Barnstable County and facilitate education on citizen-based responsibility in protecting municipal water. The campaign has two phases: (1) the Municipal Plastic Bottle Ban; and (2) the Commercial Single-use Plastic Water Bottle Ban (Commercial Ban), which was initiated in January 2020 (due to COVID-19, voting was delayed until the fall 2020 Town Meeting season). Seven towns adopted the Commercial Ban in 2020, eliminating the retail sale of non-carbonated, non-flavored water in single-use plastic bottles of less than one gallon in size effective September 2021: Brewster, Eastham, Falmouth, Harwich, Orleans, Provincetown and Wellfleet. Additional retail bans were passed in Chatham, Dennis, and Sandwich in May 2021. The Commercial Ban was defeated in Yarmouth by a narrow margin of 9 votes. In fall 2021, Mashpee passed the Commercial Ban, while Sandwich rescinded the Commercial Ban. As of year-end 2021, 9 of 15 Cape Cod towns had an effective Commercial Single-use Plastic Water Bottle Ban with 10 towns having passed the Commercial Ban. However, Mashpee's Ban was rescinded at the spring 2022 town meeting be effective September 30, 2022. followed by Dennis

In spring 2023, Sustainable Practices initiated a new campaign targeted to ban single-use plastic take-out containers and cutlery. The bylaw passed in 2 of the 7 towns where it was filed, Yarmouth and Harwich and went into effect January 1, 2024. Yarmouth also passed the Commercial Single-use Plastic Water Bottle Ban, which then went into effect at year-end 2023.

=== India ===
In 2015, the state of Bihar has banned the usage of plastic water bottles in governmental meetings and events.

In 2016, the state of Sikkim restricted the usage of plastic water bottles (in government functions and meetings) along with styrofoam products.

The government of Maharashtra banned all single-use plastic beverage bottles in March 2018. Single-use is defined there as under half a liter. Larger sizes have a refundable fee applied to them.

The government of Gujarat banned use of plastic mineral water bottle in all government offices and events from March 2019.

== University bans ==
Washington University in St. Louis is believed to be the first university to enact a ban on single use water bottles. They have noted a significant reduction of over 500,000 plastic bottles being generated annually.

Despite being the second American public university to enact a ban on bottled water in 2013, the University of Vermont has not yet experienced much positive effect from the implemented ban. University professor Rachel Johnson has seen, "total number of bottles on campus increase." In conjunction with the ban, UVM integrated a number of filtered water stations across campus. However, the consumption of other bottled beverages such as soda and juices has become more prevalent. The university continues its efforts by, "doubling the number of water stations on campus and stocking them with biodegradable cups."

Contrary to the University of Vermont, overall bottled beverage sales have decreased by more than a third over the past seven years at Washington University in St. Louis. Since eliminating the sales of bottled water on campus, the university has also seen a decrease in soda fountain sales, which leads observers to believe that water is not necessarily being replaced by sugary beverage alternatives. The assistant vice chancellor for sustainability largely attributes the university's success to its bottled water ban, as well as its accompanying efforts to retrofit old water fountains, add new water stations on campus, and celebrate the student body's growing interest in sustainability.

== Alternatives to plastic bottles ==
Some alternatives to plastic bottles are already available and many more are to be designed. For example, a simple solution to this is to use a reusable bottle and fill it up at stations, water fountains, or food establishments.

Another alternative to single use plastic bottled water is aluminum canned and bottled water. Aluminum cans are unique in that they are most often recycled directly back into themselves meaning that the average can has a very high percentage of recycled content. This means that aluminum cans have more than three times the recycled content than EPA estimates for glass or plastic, with 70 percent recycled content on average.

Innovative alternatives to plastics continue to emerge. A group of students has managed to create a biodegradable plastic bottle from algae and other natural materials. The implementation and use of a product like this could take a big cut in the use of plastics.
