= International Bottled Water Association =

Logo of the International Bottled Water Association.

The International Bottled Water Association (IBWA) is a trade association of companies in the bottled water industry.

It promotes bottled water through events such as National Hurricane Preparedness Week in the United States. The association fights attempts to ban or tax bottled water and is active in other legislative and regulatory areas, including drafting bottled water regulations adopted by some state governments.

It has worked with the FDA in developing a Model Bottled Water Regulation (also known as the Model Code), providing specific guidance to bottlers on legal requirements, quality standards, monitoring procedures and labeling requirements. Members of the IBWA are required to abide by the Code.

== History ==
Started out as the American Bottled Water Association, ABWA founded in 1958; it took on the mantel of IBWA as it grew to include international bottlers in the early 1980s.

== Conventions ==
IBWA operates an annual convention and trade show.

== See also ==
- List of bottled water brands
- Water management
