= Official Languages and Bilingualism Institute =

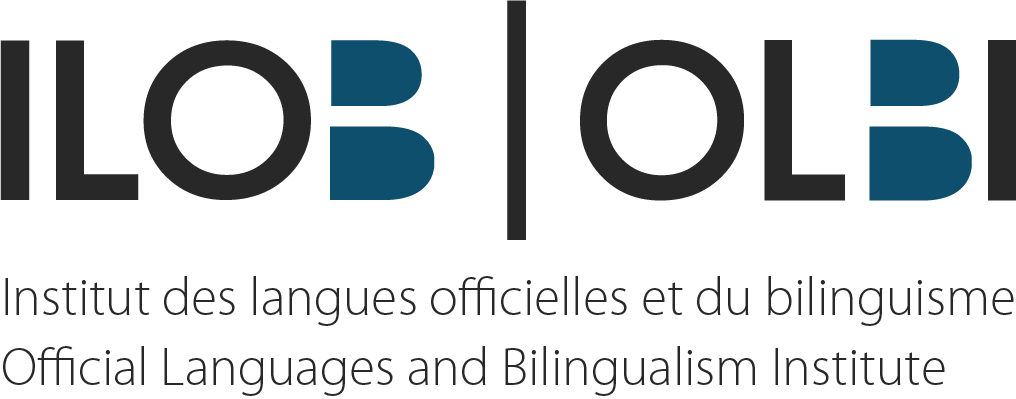
- Former name: Centre for Second Language Learning (CSLL) (1968-1989) Second Language Institute (SLI) (1989-2007)
- Motto: Commitment and Innovation
- Type: Institute
- Established: 1968
- Affiliations: University of Ottawa
- Director: Elena Valenzuela
- Location: Ottawa, Ontario, Canada
- Language: English and French
- Website: www.olbi.uOttawa.ca

The Official Languages and Bilingualism Institute (OLBI) (French: Institut des langues officielles et du bilinguisme) is a language institution affiliated with the University of Ottawa, in Ottawa, Canada. Its mission is to promote excellence and innovation in the fields of bilingualism and language acquisition, thus helping the University fulfill its role to "further bilingualism and biculturalism and preserve and develop French culture in Ontario."

Specifically, creating the Institute would allow the University to achieve the following objectives:

1. Strengthen the bilingual image and character of the University of Ottawa nationally and internationally, and express in concrete terms its commitment to the social and human values underlying bilingualism and biculturalism;
2. Recognize—and continue to build on—the vital role played to date by the Faculty of Arts and, in particular, by the Second Language Institute in promoting bilingualism and Canada's official languages;
3. Highlight, strengthen and expand teaching and research not only in language acquisition and teaching, but also in language planning;
4. Actively promote skill and expertise in language acquisition and teaching, and in language planning; share this body of knowledge with the entire university community, throughout Canada and abroad.

== History ==
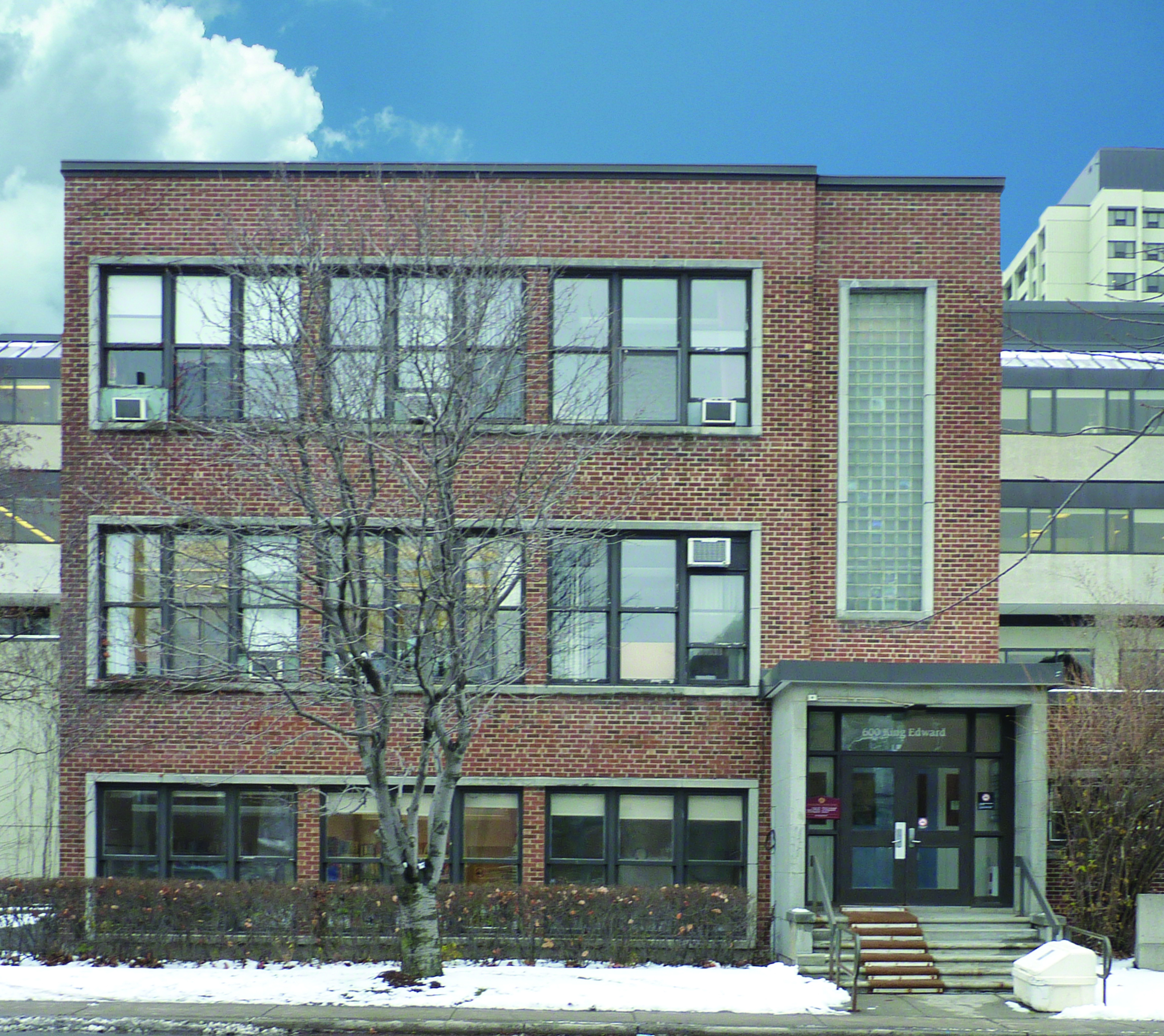
OLBI at 600 King Edward

The unit was first created in 1968 under the name Centre for Second Language Learning (French: Centre des langues vivantes), with the mandate of "teaching English and French as second languages (ESL and FLS) to undergraduate students and others in the University community, and of evaluating second language proficiency for the graduation requirements of the various faculties". The Centre was situated at 154 Waller at the University of Ottawa, and was initially part of the Department of Linguistics and Modern Languages. However, it established itself as an autonomous unit of the Faculty of Arts and acquired its first official director, Raymond LeBlanc, in 1970.

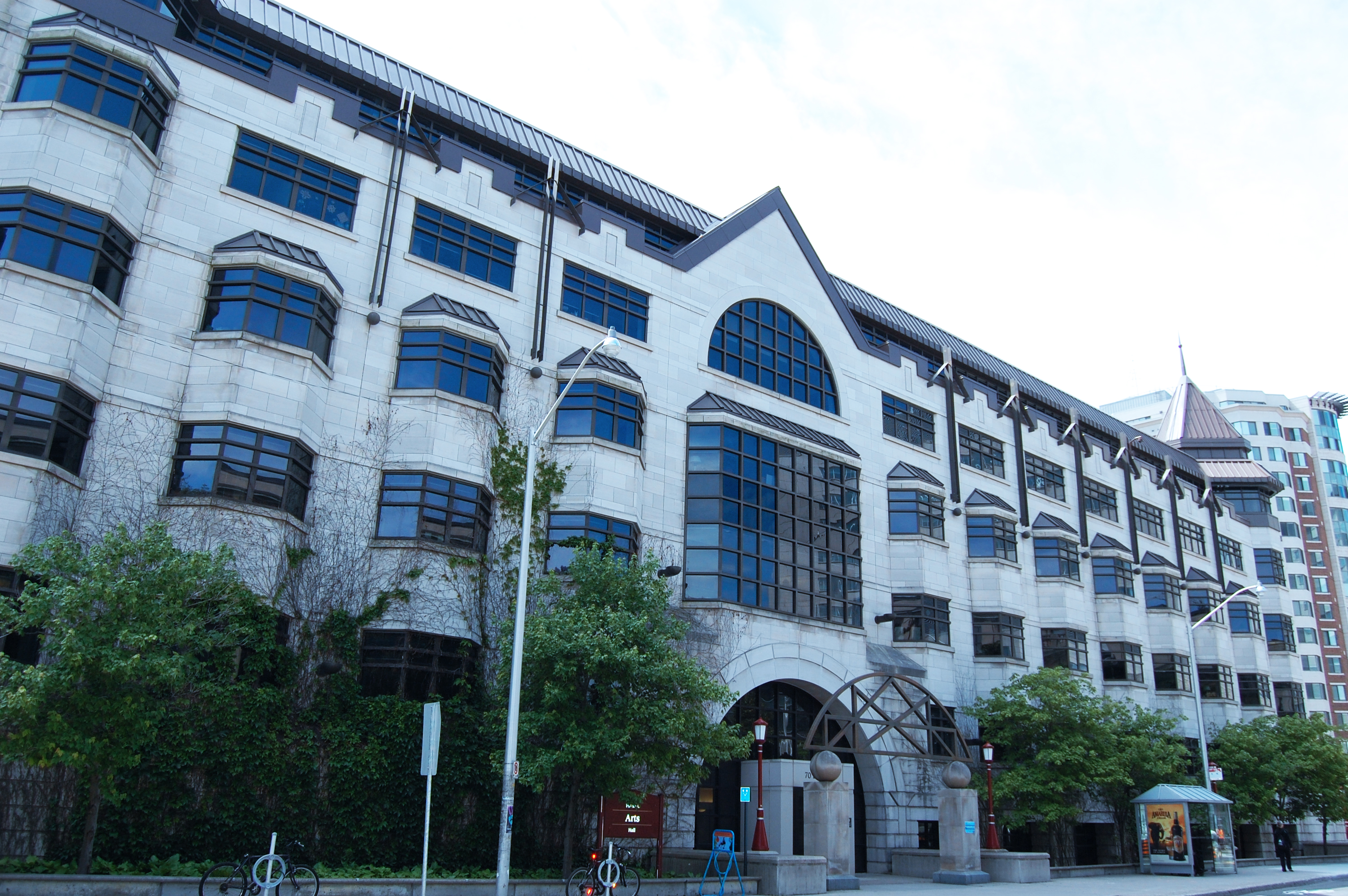
OLBI in Hamelin Hall at 70 Laurier Avenue East

The Centre for Second Language Learning experienced many moves around campus in its early days, including a move to 59 Laurier Avenue East (the former home of the Department of Linguistics), Lamoureux Hall, and Montpetit Hall. The centre finally settled at 600 King Edward, around 1980. Due to the discrepancy between the English and French names, a decision was made to change the name of the Centre to the Second Language Institute (SLI) (French: Institut des langues secondes, ISL) on January 1, 1989. On July 1, 2007 the Institute went through yet another transformation when it became the Official Languages and Bilingualism Institute (OLBI) that exists today. In February 2013, it moved permanently to Arts Hall (renamed Hamelin Hall in September 2015), at 70 Laurier Avenue East.

=== List of directors ===
Raymond LeBlanc: 1970-1980, 1990–1994, 1995-1998

Philip C. Hauptman: 1980-1986

Marjorie B. Wesche: 1986-1990

Robert Courchêne: 1994-1995 (interim), 1998–2002, 2005-2007 (interim)

Marie-Claude Tréville: 2003-2005

Richard Clément: 2007-2017

Larry Vandergrift: January to June 2011 (interim)

Marie-Josée Hamel: January to June 2015 (interim)

Jérémie Séror: July 2017 to August 2023

Elena Valenzuela: Since July 2023

=== Direction ===
Jérémie Séror: Director and Associate Dean

Monika Jezak: Assistant Director, Administration

Beverly Baker: Director, Language Assessment

Marie-Claude Dansereau: Second Language Teaching Program Coordinator

Marie-Josée Hamel: Director, Graduate Studies

Parvin Movassat: Director, Undergraduate Studies Program

Nikolay Slavkov: Director of the Canadian Center for Studies and Research on Bilingualism and Language Planning (CCERBAL)

== Teaching ==
OLBI offers a wide range of courses in English and French as second languages or as foreign languages to University of Ottawa students, faculty, staff, as well as to others outside the University. Undergraduate, graduate, intensive, and customized courses and programs are available.

=== Credit programs and courses ===
At the undergraduate level, the Institute offers program Majors, Minors, and Advanced Minors in FLS and ESL, as well as FLS and ESL elective credit courses. Course topics range from reading and writing to listening and speaking, and are offered from the beginner level. Special accompanying FLS and ESL courses cover vocabulary used in certain University of Ottawa classes from the student's chosen field of study. In the 2015-2016 academic year, over 1,200 students enrolled in at least one ESL course, while more than 4,000 enrolled in an FLS course administered by OLBI.

Students can also obtain an Honours BA or Major in Second Language Teaching in either French or English through a program managed jointly by the Faculty of Arts and the Faculty of Education. The program focuses on learning how to teach a second language, and to students of all ages and levels.

OLBI introduced its graduate program in September 2014, a Master of Arts in Bilingualism Studies (MA). The program is centered on critical issues in the field of Applied Linguistics, including innovations in second language instruction, assessment of second language skills, as well as language policy and planning.

=== French immersion studies ===
OLBI also administers the language component of French Immersion Studies, an academic path allowing Anglophone students to study partially in French while earning their undergraduate degree. The program made its debut in 2006, and has served over 2884 students since. It is now offered in conjunction with 58 programs at the University of Ottawa, in addition to another 16 programs in the Faculty of Science that offer the Extended French Stream.

In geographic terms, about 85% of Immersion students are from Ontario, 5% from Quebec, 5% from British Columbia, and 5% from other Canadian provinces and territories and other regions of the world.

Immersion students are divided among faculties as follows: 42% from the Faculty of Social Sciences, 17% from the Faculty of Arts, 17% from the Faculty of Science, 10% from the Faculty of Health Sciences, and 13% from the Telfer School of Management.

=== Centre for Language Learning ===
Since September 1981, the Official Languages and Bilingualism Institute has offered intensive (25 hr/week) and semi-intensive (12 hr/week) courses for students wishing to learn English or French as a second language. Approximately 250 students per year enrolled in these non-credits courses in the 1980s, the majority of students in the ESL program being Libyans and Algerians. Since then, the program has expanded considerably, and now includes a number of non-credit intensive ESL and FLS programs and teacher-training programs for a variety of different groups with different needs, both within Canada and abroad. Around 1,000 participants each year come from all over the world.

Intensive language programs:

- English Intensive Program (EIP);
- Programme intensif de français (PIF);
- Summer University for FLS/FSL Teachers;
- Destination Clic (federal program oriented toward Francophone students living outside Quebec aged 13–15 years);
- University of Electronic Science and Technology of China (UESTC) (four-week integrated skills program in English instruction);
- University of Niigata Prefecture Intensive English Program;
- Ningbo University Summer Language Program;
- Shenzhen Professional Development Program (Teacher training for instructors from various contexts).

== Research ==
OLBI's research centre, the Canadian Centre for Studies and Research on Bilingualism and Language Planning (known by its French acronym, CCERBAL), promotes research on all aspects of second language education and learning, bilingualism and language planning. The CCERBAL also serves as an advisory body on language policy and social cohesion in Canada and internationally. Its services are available to the academic community, to governments, and to non-governmental organizations with interest and responsibilities in the field of bilingualism, broadly defined. Its mandate is to promote exchanges, interdisciplinarity and research partnerships. Created in October 2008, the centre hosts numerous conferences and symposia, and research forums. CCERBAL also publishes its own peer-reviewed publication "OLBI Working Papers".

CCERBAL has established two Research Chairs in Bilingualism:

- University Research Chair on Bilingualism and Society;
- University Chair in New Technologies and Computer Assisted Language Learning.

These four research groups are affiliated with CCERBAL:

- University Immersion Interdisciplinary Research Group (UIIRG);
- Language Assessment Research Group (LARG);
- Interdisciplinary Research Group in Languages and Technologies (IRGILT);
- Language Management Interdisciplinary Research Group (LMIRG)

Founding members of CCERBAL include Nathalie Bélanger (Faculty of Education), Linda Cardinal (Faculty of Social Sciences), Richard Clément (OLBI), Pierre Foucher (Faculty of Law), Juana Liceras (Faculty of Arts), Shana Poplack (Faculty of Arts), Larry Vandergrift (OLBI), and Luise von Flotow (Faculty of Arts).

== Language assessment ==
From the 1970s to the 1990s, all undergraduate students at the University of Ottawa were required to pass a second language proficiency test in order to meet their graduation requirements. These language tests had been developed and administered by the Centre for Second Language Learning to more than 3,000 students a year. Up until 1993, those who did not succeed in passing the test were required to take a second language course, also run by the Centre.

While second language proficiency is no longer obligatory for graduation at the University of Ottawa, the Official Languages and Bilingualism Institute remains actively engaged in the administration of English and French language tests and evaluations.This includes internationally recognized certification tests as well as in-house placement tests.

Tests administered by OLBI:

- CanTEST and TESTCan;
- TCF – Test de connaissance du français;
- Diplôme d’Études en Langue Française (DELF);
- Diplôme Approfondi de Langue Française (DALF);
- uOttawa Course Placement Test;
- Language Assessment for French Immersion;
- Proficiency Test;
- Second Language Certification Test;
- Employee Language Assessment;
- International English Language Testing System (IELTS);
- Second Language Teaching Admission Test.

== Development and promotion ==
With the goal of fostering bilingualism, OLBI's Development and Promotion Office maintains agreements with language organizations around the world.

OLBI's partner institutions:

- Office of the Commissioner of Official Languages of Canada (OCOL);
- International Association of Language Commissioners (IALC);
- European Centre for Modern Languages (ECML);
- Canadian Association of Language Assessment (CALA);
- International Language Testing Association (ILTA);
- CALDO;
- Inter-American Organization for Higher Education (IOHE);
- Latinus;
- Ottawa School Boards.

== Resources ==
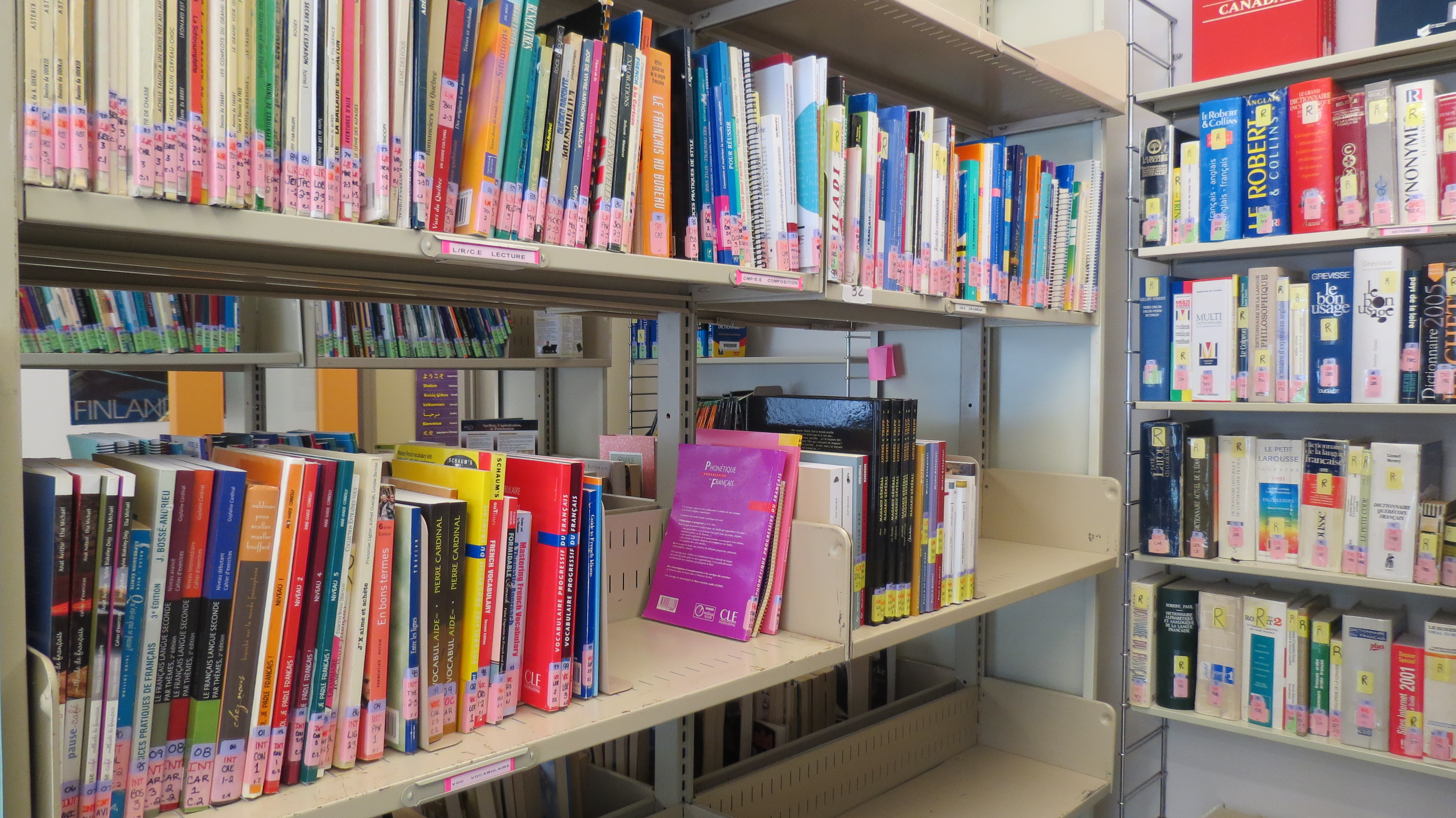
Julien Couture Resource Centre

The Student Resource Centre, now known as the Julien Couture Resource Centre, was established in 1986 to promote autonomy in second language learning. It holds a large collection of helpful materials and resources for language teachers and learners, scholars, and the general public. Among these are books, magazines, audio-visuals, and more.

In addition to the Resource Centre, OLBI provides students with conversation workshops, language labs with audio recording technology, and the project Portail Francophile, which fosters exchange between Francophone and Francophile students.
