= Madhavi Venkatesan =

American economist and environmental activist

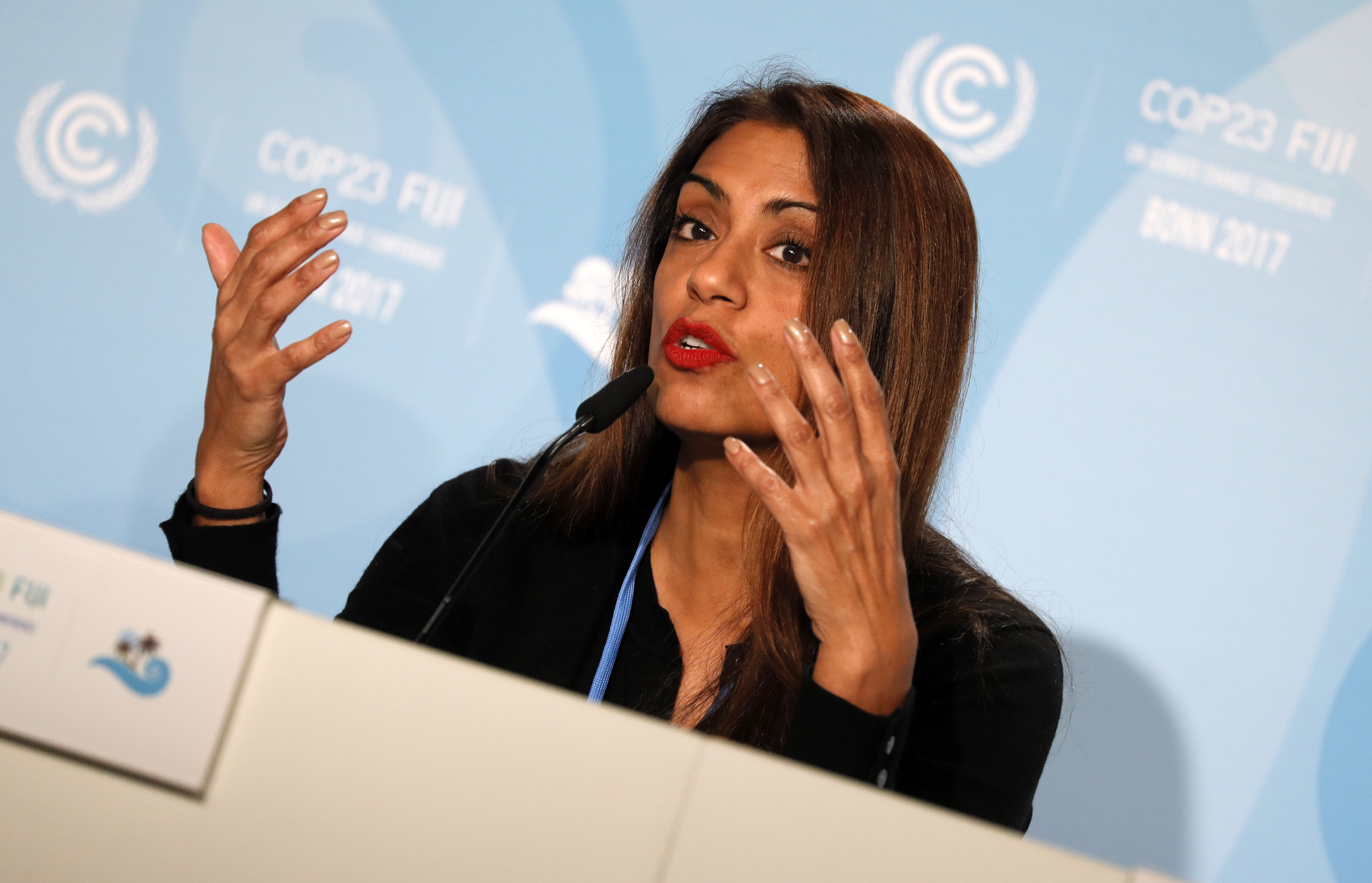
- Venkatesan at a UN Climate Change Conference (COP23) in 2017

Academic background
- Education: Vanderbilt University (BS, MA, PhD)

Academic work
- Discipline: Economics
- Institutions: Northeastern University; Bridgewater State University
- Main interests: Sustainability

Madhavi Venkatesan is an American economist and environmental activist. She is a teaching professor of economics at Northeastern University.

== Biography ==
Venkatesan received her B.A., M.A., and Ph.D. in economics from Vanderbilt University; her dissertation focus was on the creation of the black middle class in America. Following a postdoctoral fellowship at Washington University in St.Louis, she entered the financial services industry as an equity analyst, and then served as an investor relations officer for three Fortune 250 companies in the insurance sector. In 2014, she re-entered academic employment as an assistant professor of economics at Bridgewater State University and in 2017, she joined the faculty of the Department of Economics at Northeastern University as an assistant teaching professor, where her research and writing continued to focus on equity, justice, and sustainability.

Venkatesan traveled to the Philippines in 2018 as the Fulbright-SyCip Distinguished Lecturer; her invited lectures addressed the economics of climate change. In 2019 she published her fourth text, SDG8 - Sustainable Economic Growth and Decent Work for All.

As of April 2021, Venkatesan serves as the editor in chief of Sustainability and Climate Change.

== Research ==
Venkatesan's academic interests include the integration of sustainability into the economics curriculum. She has been active in promoting education and stakeholder engagement to incorporate ethics into the existing economic framework and her written work has largely focused on these topics as a catalyst to promoting sustainability. Venkatesan has also contributed to the literature on the relationship between culture, sustainability and economics, addressing the relationship between economic systems and cultural convergence. She is an advocate for changing the quantitative focus of present economic goals (e.g., GDP, income) to qualitative attributes of well-being that acknowledge and incorporate the interconnectivity between humans and the ecosystems they inhabit.

== Sustainable Practices ==
In 2016, Venkatesan established Sustainable Practices, a 501(c)3 nonprofit with a mission "to facilitate a culture of sustainability as defined by reducing the human-made impact to the planet and its ecosystems" within Barnstable County, Massachusetts, and serves as the organization's executive director. In 2019, Sustainable Practices initiated the Municipal Plastic Bottle Ban campaign. The organization followed with the Commercial Single-use Plastic Water Bottle Ban in 2020. In 2023, Sustainable Practices initiated an additional campaign, Plastic Reduction. The initiative specifically targets and eliminates the retail use of single-use takeout plastic. The Municipal Plastic Bottle Ban has been in effect in all 15 Cape Cod towns since 2021, the Commercial Single-use Plastic Water Bottle Ban and Plastic Reduction remain as ongoing campaigns.

== Awards and honors ==
USA Today named Madhavi Venkatesan as the woman of the year for the state of Massachusetts, one of their 60 "Women of the Year 2024," for her campaign to ban plastic beverage bottles in municipalities.
