= Lenore Fahrig =

Biologist

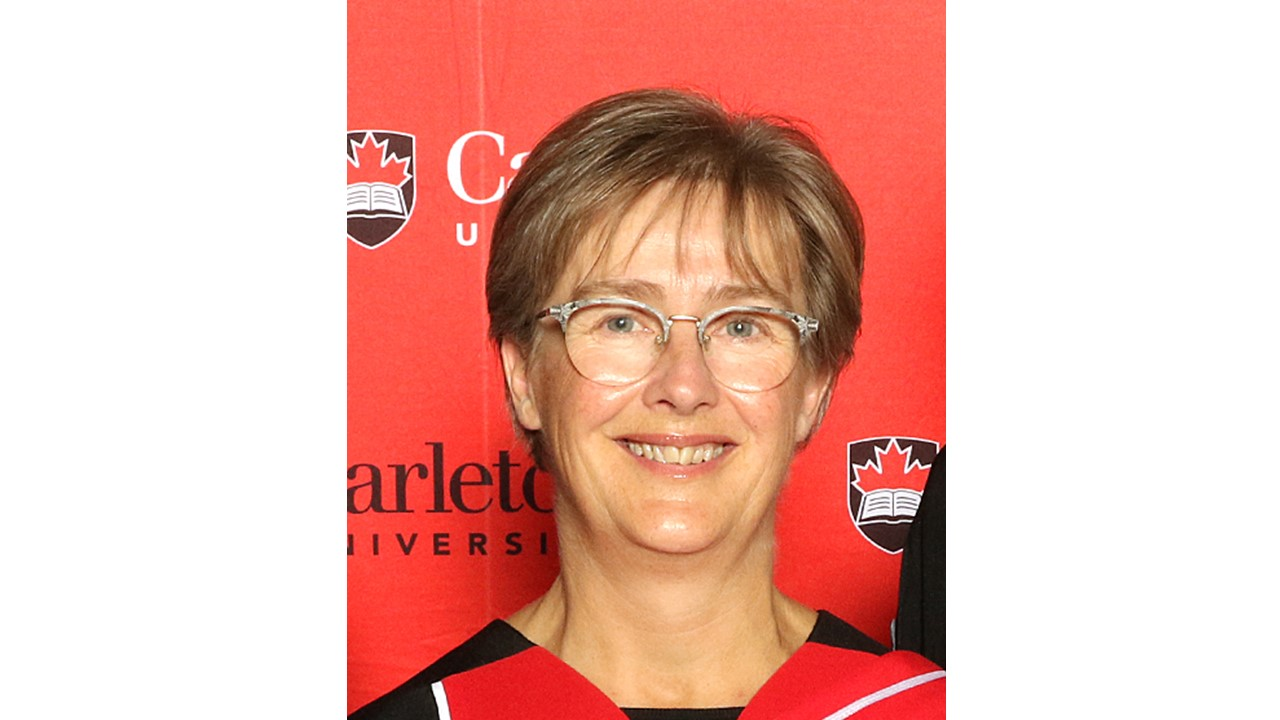
- Education: University of Toronto; Carleton University; Queen's University
- Awards: Fellow of the Royal Society of Canada; Gerhard Herzberg Canada Gold Medal for Science and Engineering
- Scientific career
- Fields: Landscape ecology Conservation biology Road ecology
- Workplaces: Carleton University
- Website: carleton.ca/fahriglab/

Lenore Fahrig is a Canadian ecologist. She is a Chancellor's Professor in the biology department at Carleton University, Canada and a Fellow of the Royal Society of Canada. Fahrig studies effects of landscape structure—the arrangement of forests, wetlands, roads, cities, and farmland—on wildlife populations and biodiversity, and is best known for her work on habitat fragmentation. In 2023, she was elected to the National Academy of Sciences.

== Early life and education ==
Fahrig is from Ottawa, Ontario. She completed a BSc (Biology) at Queen's University, Kingston, in 1981 and an MSc from Carleton University, Ottawa in 1983 under the supervision of Gray Merriam, on habitat connectivity and population stability. She completed her PhD in 1987 at the University of Toronto under the supervision of Jyri Paloheimo, on the effects of animal dispersal behaviour on the relationship between population size and habitat spatial arrangement.

== Research and career ==
After her PhD, Fahrig worked for two years as a postdoctoral fellow at the University of Virginia, researching how different plant dispersal strategies allow species to respond to environmental disturbances. She then spent two years as a research scientist for the Federal Department of Fisheries and Oceans in St. John's, Newfoundland, Canada, where she modeled the spatial and temporal interactions between fisheries and fish populations. In 1991 she joined the faculty of the Biology Department at Carleton University, Ottawa, where, as of 2024, she is a Chancellor's Professor and the Gray Merriam Chair in Landscape Ecology.

Fahrig is best known for her work on habitat fragmentation. Her early work in this area culminated in her highly cited 2003 review. Fahrig argues that the effects of fragmentation (breaking of habitat into small patches) on biodiversity should be estimated independently of the effects of habitat loss, showing that the combined effects of habitat loss and fragmentation are almost entirely due to the effects of habitat loss alone. This is important for species conservation because it means that, on a per-area basis, habitat in small patches is as valuable for conservation as habitat in large patches. This finding negates a common 'excuse' for habitat destruction, namely the assumed low conservation value of small patches. Fahrig's later work on habitat fragmentation found that effects of habitat fragmentation on biodiversity, independent of effects of habitat loss, are more likely to be positive than negative. This indicates that small patches have high cumulative value for biodiversity, and provides support for small-scale conservation efforts. Fahrig presented her work on habitat fragmentation at the International Biogeography Society's 50th anniversary celebration of The Theory of Island Biogeography, and at the World Biodiversity Forum. She published a retrospective article on her habitat fragmentation research for the 30th anniversary of the journal Global Ecology and Biogeography.

Fahrig has also worked on habitat connectivity, road ecology, and effects of cropland heterogeneity on biodiversity. Based on her MSc thesis in 1983, Fahrig and Merriam published the first paper on habitat connectivity., and provided the earliest evidence for the concept of wildlife movement corridors. These concepts–habitat connectivity and wildlife movement corridors – are widely used in large-scale conservation planning, in municipal and regional greenways planning, and in mitigation of road effects on wildlife. Fahrig and colleagues' further work demonstrated the importance of distinguishing between structural and functional connectivity. and showed that habitat fragmentation does not necessarily decrease functional connectivity. Fahrig's contributions in road ecology include the first paper to show that roadkill causes declines in wildlife populations. Her later work showed strong and widespread impacts of roads on wildlife populations. Fahrig and her students found that the groups of species whose populations are most impacted by roads are amphibians, reptiles, and mammals with low reproductive rates. They also argued that high roadkill sites are not necessarily the best sites for mitigating road effects on wildlife, and that ecopassages alone do not reduce roadkill. Her research on cropland heterogeneity shows that regions with small crop fields have higher biodiversity than regions with large crop fields, even when the total area under crop production is the same. Further, her group showed that this benefit of cropland heterogeneity to biodiversity is as large as the benefits from reducing intense practices such as pesticide use. She is a co-author of a book on road ecology, and several major reviews of the subject.

== Honours and distinctions ==
- 2016 Elected Fellow of the Royal Society of Canada
- 2018 Miroslaw Romanowski Medal for environmental science
- 2019 Chancellor's Professor: highest honour by Carleton University for research and scholarship
- 2021 Guggenheim Fellowship in Geography & Environmental Studies from the Guggenheim Foundation
- 2021 President's Award from the Canadian Society for Ecology and Evolution for Research Excellence
- 2021 BBVA Foundation Frontiers of Knowledge Awards in Ecology and Conservation Biology
- 2022 Gerhard Herzberg Canada Gold Medal for Science and Engineering
