= Railroad ecology =

Study of organisms by railroads

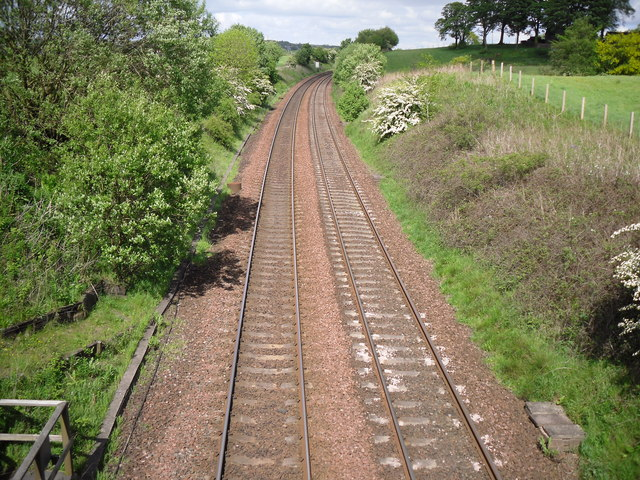
Train tracks in the United Kingdom

Railroad ecology or railway ecology is a term used to refer to the study of the ecological community growing along railroad or railway tracks and the effects of railroads on natural ecosystems. Such ecosystems have been studied primarily in Europe. Similar conditions and effects appear also by roads used by vehicles. Railroads along with roads, canals, and power lines are examples of linear infrastructure intrusions.

== Conditions ==
Railroad beds, like road beds, are designed to drain water away from the tracks, so there is usually a bed of rock and gravel resulting in fast drainage away from the tracks. At the same time, this drainage often accumulates in areas fairly near the tracks where drainage is poor, forming small artificial wetlands. These unnatural conditions combine to form different zones, some in which water is scarce, others in which water is abundant.

== Maintenance ==
Railroad companies routinely clear-cut and/or spray with herbicide any vegetation that grows too close to the tracks. This favors vegetation that is able to respond favorably to clearcutting, and/or resist herbicides.

On overhead electrified railroad lines, clear-cutting must be more extensive, vertically as well as horizontally, in order to prevent vegetation (especially tree limbs) from interfering with the pantographs on a moving train, breaking off and falling on the wires, or simply from arcing in proximity to high voltage transmission cables. The same vegetative selection processes described in the previous paragraph apply, but may additionally favor climbing vines due to the presence of catenary and transmission poles in addition to the wooden communications and signal pole lines which often exist(ed) along nonelectrified lines.

== History ==
Historically, conditions along railroad beds were very different from today. Coal engines used to blanket the area with soot, favoring species adapted to these conditions (some of which only occurred naturally in volcanic areas). Newer engines produced a less remarkable environment, but many of the same plants have remained and adapted to this new environment.

== Invasive species ==
Railway tracks (like roads and highways) are often colonized by non-native invasive species. In North America, such species include trees such as Ailanthus altissima, Paulownia tomentosa, Siberian Elm, and Norway Maple, and invasive non-woody plants such as Japanese Knotweed and Phragmites. The railway tracks provide corridors along which these species can spread and thrive, even when the surrounding areas might be less hospitable to them. Many invasive species have been known to be propagated by railways, these include: spotted knapweed, South African ragwort, Oxford ragwort, rat, mouse, ants, beetle, spider, and armadillo.

=== Causes ===
There are three mechanisms that lead to invasive species being spread by the railway industry:

- Commodity: when the goods carried by train are the invasive species, which can escape into the surrounding habitat.
- Stowaway: when the invasive species is inadvertently transported by train.
- Natural dispersion: when the species invades by an artificial corridor such as the railway verge.

Railway verges, similarly to road verges, are typically regularly mowed and covered in herbicide by train companies. This creates an environment that is very different from the surrounding habitat, which could be a forest for example. Native species from the surrounding habitat are not adapted to this new habitat type, allowing generalist species and species who favor open environments to take root. These railway verges can extend for multiple kilometers without being interrupted, creating a corridor for species to disperse. Additionally, when constructing a new railway, vegetation is removed, soil is bared, and water is managed, creating ideal conditions for invasive plants to implant.

=== Impacts ===
The impacts of invasive species are widespread. They modify communities and ecosystems making them more vulnerable to disruptions such as climate change. They can outcompete native species and cause their extinction. For humans, invasive species have a huge economic cost.

=== Management ===
There are four main management categories to stop invasive species along railways: the do-nothing strategy, the management of the propagule supply, the management of environmental conditions, and the management of the invasive species populations. The do-nothing strategy is, as its name suggests, to not try to act against the invasive species. This strategy can be appropriate when the cost of management is very high or when a native species will likely overtake an invasive species in future successional stages of the railway verge. Managing the propagule supply can be done in many ways, planting or seeding the verge with native plants and using fire management to burn seeds of invasive species are two examples of this method. Changing the environmental conditions to prevent native species from implanting can be done through soil compaction for example. Removing the invasive species can be done by burning, using herbicides or mechanical removal. Removing new patches of the invasive species should be prioritized when this species spreads fast as this new patch can be a new source of dispersal. Creating barriers for the invasive species to stop spreading should be done for species with lower dispersion speeds. Management practices should always take into account native species to not harm them.

== Impacts on local wildlife ==
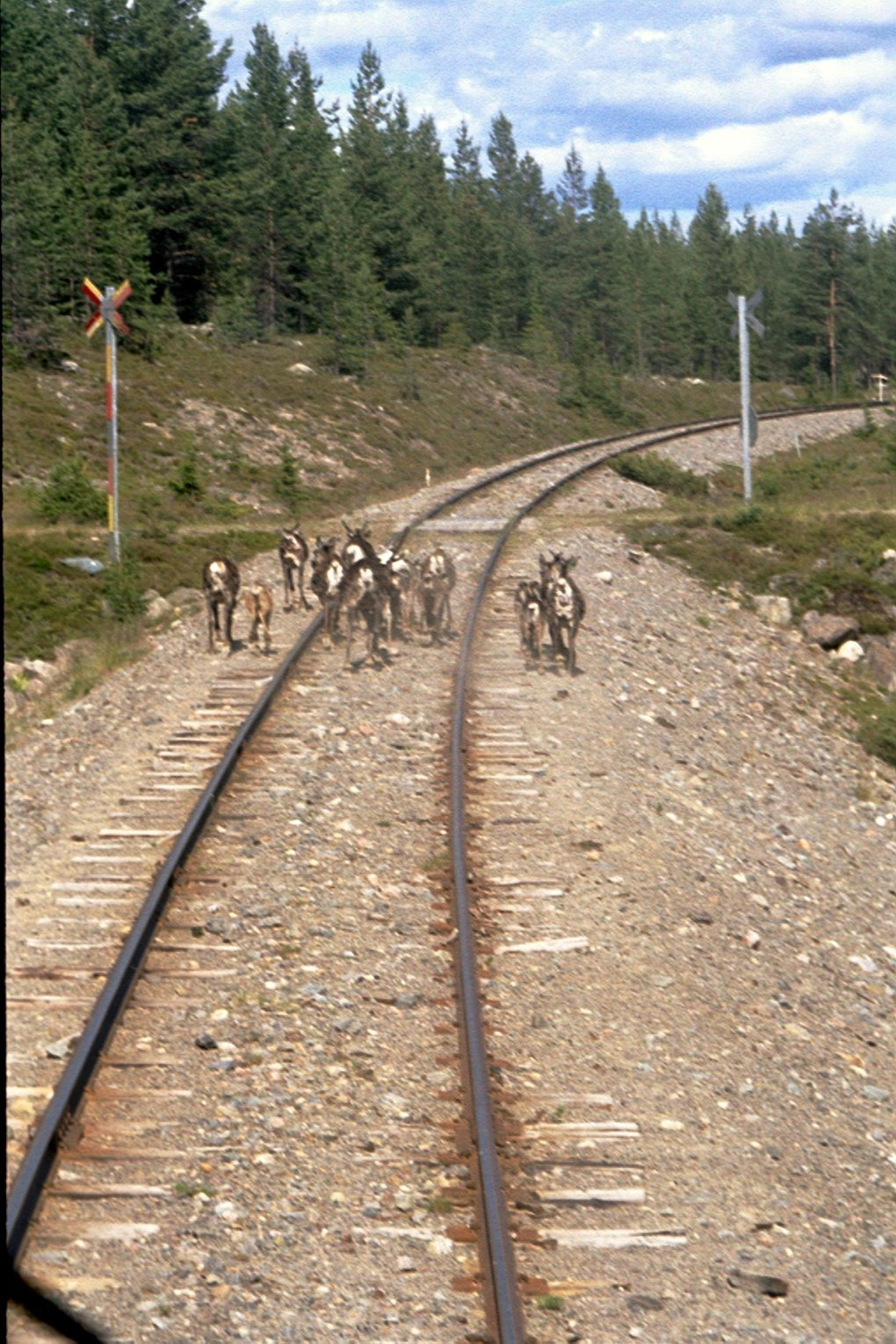
Reindeer on railway tracks in Sweden forcing the train to slow down.

There are four main impacts on wildlife from railroads: wildlife mortality, the barrier effect, habitat fragmentation/loss, and disturbances.

=== Wildlife mortality ===
==== Wildlife-train collisions ====
Wildlife species from smaller birds and mammals to deer and large mammals such as elephants may be killed in collisions with trains running on railway tracks. Studies on wildlife-train collisions have mostly been focused on moose and bear. These species are large and due to their size, are more likely to cause a financial impact when a train collides with them. They are also considered charismatic megafauna and keystone species in conservation efforts. More research is needed on the effects of railroads on smaller species.

==== Other causes of mortality ====
Rail entrapment, wire strikes and electrocution are some of the other causes of mortality due to railways. Eastern box turtles can enter in between rails at the level crossings and be unable to escape once they are outside of the level crossing zone.

=== Barriers ===
Railways and powerlines to supply electrical trains, like other linear infrastructures, divide habitats when built. This prevents species from moving from one side of the railway to the other, either through mortality or barriers, this is known as the barrier effect. These railways also remove habitat in the location where the railway and its verge are built. More railways and high speed railways are being built around the world because they are more environmentally friendly for the transportation of goods and people than planes or road vehicles. These new constructions increase landscape fragmentation and habitat loss which also causes biodiversity loss.

==== Physical ====
Some species, such as the eastern box turtle and other types of herpetofauna, are unable to physically cross rails. This poses a barrier for them to move across the landscape from one side of the train tracks to the other.

==== Behavioural ====
Pollution due to diesel engines, sound and vibrations can prevent wildlife from crossing train tracks. Species such as the Mongolian gazelle who can physically cross the railway avoid them up to 300 meters away.

=== Railway attraction ===
Some species are attracted by the railway to use it for feeding or as a transportation corridor. Omnivorous or granivorous species feed on grain that is spilled on the tracks by trains. Other species will eat vegetation near the train tracks, as this edge habitat usually contains vegetation that is different from the one located inside forests, farther away from the railway. Carcasses of animals previously killed on the railway can also attract scavengers. Caribous have a higher chance of being preyed upon by wolves when located near linear infrastructures, of which railways are a part of. This indicates that wolves are likely using these railways to access prey more easily.

== Railway mitigation measures ==
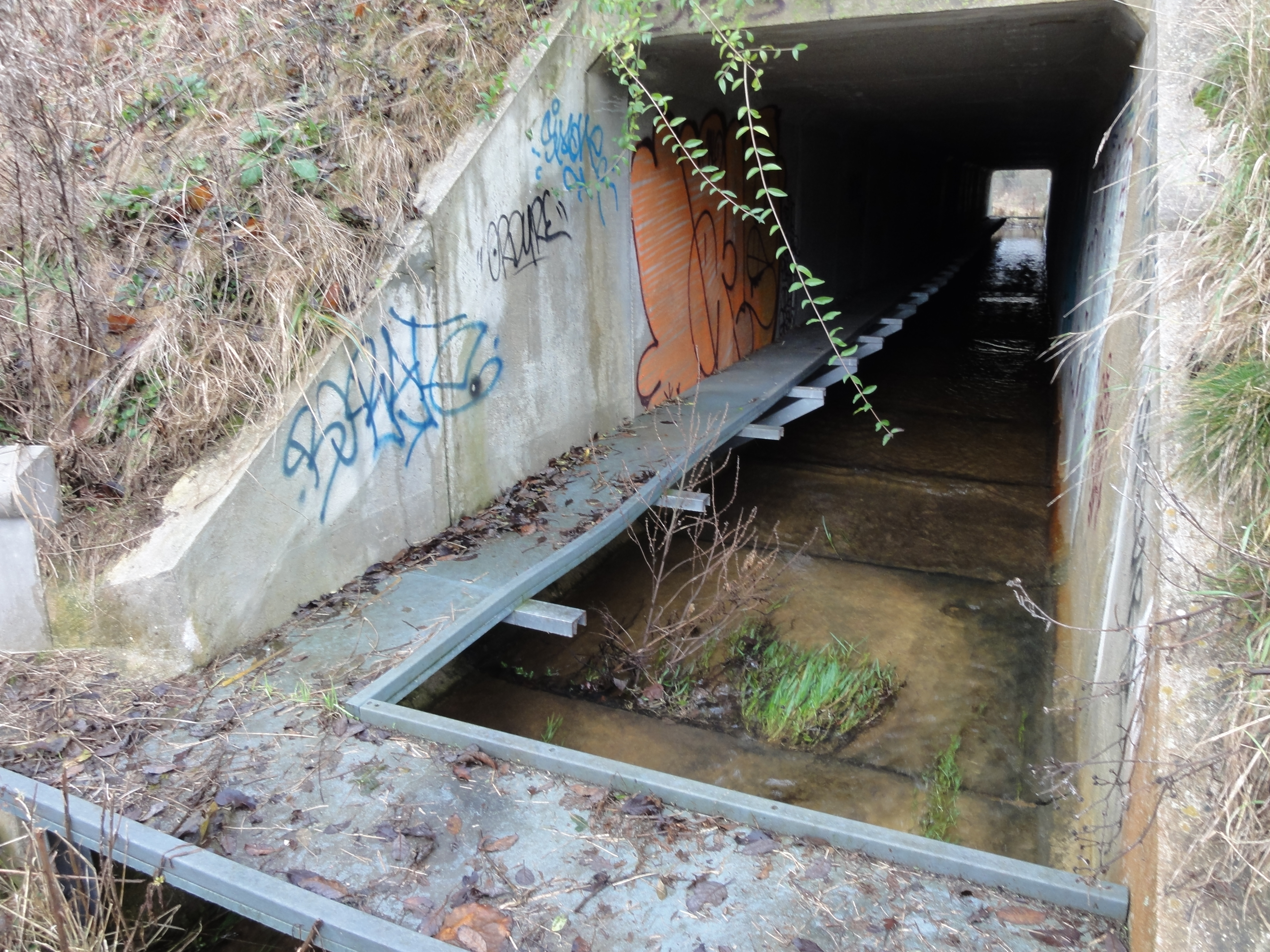
A dry ledge for small fauna installed in a water culvert in Auneuil.

There are many different railway mitigation measures, most of them fit into two main categories: either to prevent animals from being on the tracks or reduce the barrier effect.

=== Measures that allow movement across the railway ===
Structures already built into the railway infrastructure such as pipe culverts, box culverts, small access roads and bridges to cross rivers or valleys can offer safe passage underneath the railway for wildlife. Culverts can be adapted during their construction or afterwards to better allow wildlife to use them as crossing structures by including dry ledges, modifying the habitat at the entrances, avoiding slopes or steps, etc. Modifying culverts is likely the most economical solution to reduce the barrier effect. Wildlife underpasses and overpasses are also good ways to reduce the barrier effect of railways, but they are associated with a much higher cost of construction. These types of structures mainly help land animals, with birds and bats only being helped by extremely large structures. The rock between two railway sleepers can be excavated to allow small mammals and herpetofauna who are unable to physically cross rails to do so.

=== Measures that restrict access to the railway ===
Measures that repel wildlife from the railway are considered the most effective to reduce mortality. They also greatly increase the barrier effect if they are not combined with measures to allow movement across the railway. Exclusion fences are the most cost-effective measure to reduce mortality. They are not effective for species which can climb, dig or fly over the fences. They also need to include areas for animals trapped in between the exclusion fences to escape into the surrounding habitat. Poles and trees can mitigate mortality for flying species. Olfactory repellants have mixed results on reducing moose casualties. Sound and light signals can be either stationary or attached to oncoming trains. In the case of roe deer, sound signals make this species run towards the railway track, where the trains cannot avoid the collision. Audio animal calls produced 30 seconds to 3 minutes before the arrival of a train increased the rate and the speed at which wildlife fled, with wildlife not habituating to these sounds.

=== Other mitigation measures ===
Reducing train speed at mortality hotspots or during migration periods can help animals and train drivers see each other earlier, leaving more time for the animals to flee. Mowing and reducing vegetation on the verge can also achieve this. This measure can also increase the barrier effect. Feeding stations away from the railway reduces collisions in the case of moose. Electrified overhead wires for electric trains can use similar mitigation measures as those for powerlines. Poles for powerlines should be capped to prevent nesting birds from falling into them and becoming trapped. Selective hunting and trapping near railways can reduce wildlife-train collisions. Construction of rail infrastructure can also be reduced or stopped during critical periods of migration.

== Differences between road ecology and railway ecology ==
Railway ecology is much less studied than road ecology. This could be because railways are typically harder to access than roads or because roadkill is much more visible to the public, while wildlife-train collisions are only visible to train drivers. Trains and railways are very different from road motor vehicles and roads themselves. Trains typically are on a singular track, they cannot swerve to avoid a collision and their capacity to slow down is very limited. Trains only come from one direction, while roads are normally bidirectional. Intervals between vehicles are much longer on railways than on roads. Only a singular train comes at a time, while many vehicles are on the same stretch of road at once, often on multiple lanes. Road traffic occurs more often during the daytime, while train traffic can be higher in nighttime. Trains cause more vibrations due to their weight and the interaction between tracks and wheels. There is a large proportion of electrical trains, leading to lower emissions near tracks than gas vehicles on roads. Trains can be much quieter than road vehicles. The size of the railway and its verge is normally much smaller than the size of a road and its verge. High speed trains can be much faster than road vehicles, and fencing is more common along these high speed train tracks.

== See also ==
- Ecotope
