= Road barrier effect =

Effect of roads and railways on the movement of wildlife

The barrier effect of roads and highways is a phenomenon usually associated with landscape ecology, referring to the barrier that linear infrastructure like roads or railways place on the movement of animals. Largely viewed as a negative process, the barrier effect has also been found to have several positive effects, particularly with smaller species. To reduce a road or railway's barrier effect, wildlife crossings are regarded as one of the best mitigation options, ideally in combination with wildlife fencing. The barrier effect is closely linked to habitat fragmentation and road ecology.

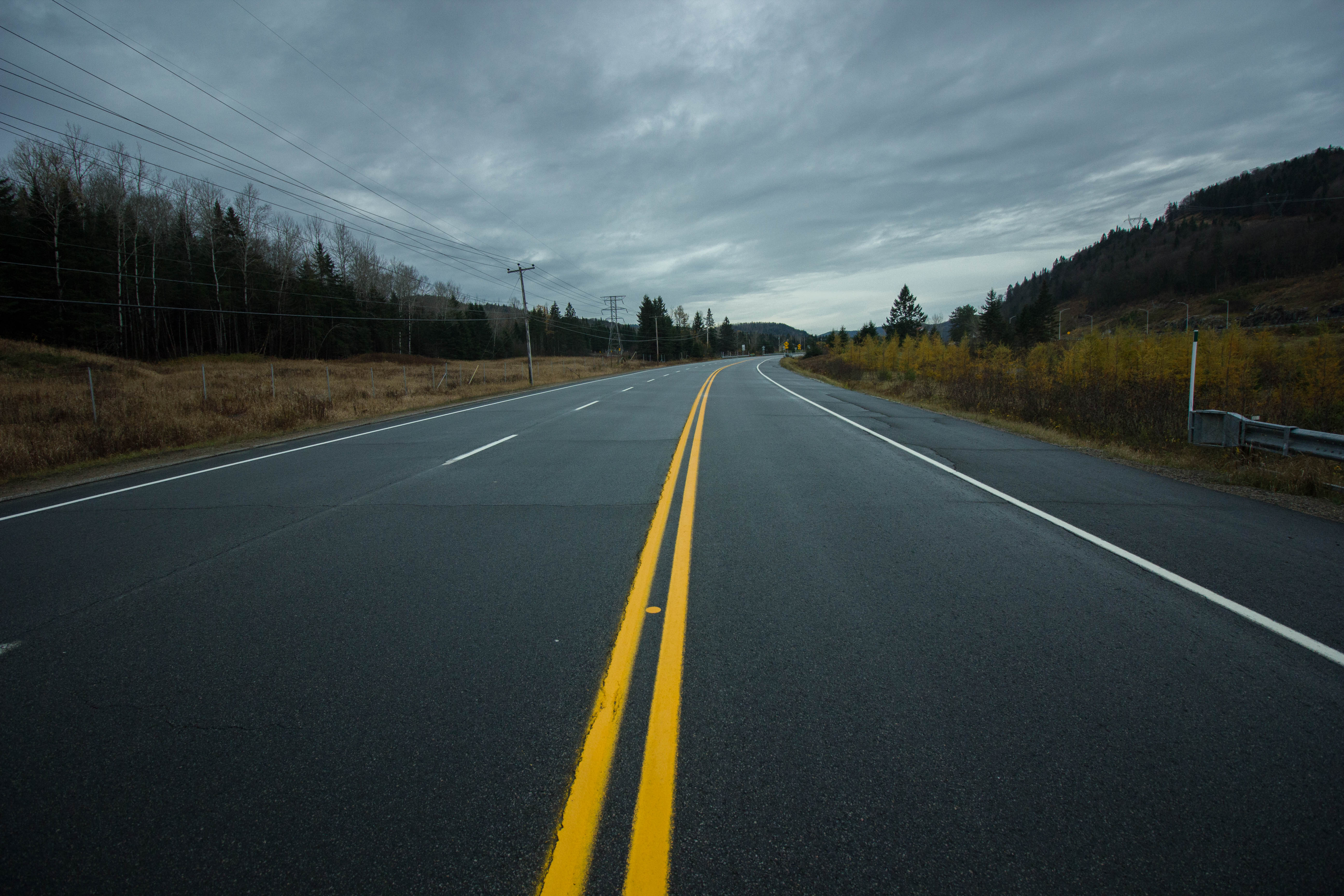
Highway 10 in Quebec, Canada

== Effects on wildlife ==
=== Negative effects ===
==== Roads ====
Both existing roads and the construction of new highways act as barriers for many species, fragmenting the surrounding habitat to such a degree that connectivity, or the ability for an animal to travel to all areas of its home range, is made practically impossible. Generally, animals with a higher vagility, or ability to travel long distances, are more severely impacted by roads compared to species with smaller home ranges.

==== Railways ====
While very few studies have analyzed the effect of railways on animal movement, their presence across landscapes in most areas of the world suggests that they likely pose a significant barrier for many species. Most studies relating to this sub-field focus on animal use of drainage culverts underneath railway networks. For example, Rodriguez et al. (1996) found that nearly 80% of culverts in their study received visits by both mammals and reptiles.

==== Land-use types ====
Although few studies have analyzed the effect of land type on animal movement, those that exist have found man-made clearings and agricultural land to be strong barriers for many species who may only travel within forested landscapes.

=== Positive effects ===
12% of studies analyzing the effects of roads on animals have found positive effects, indicating that some species benefit from the presence of roads. The predation release hypothesis, suggesting that roads may indirectly cause increases in abundances of animals whose predators are negatively affected by road, is often attributed to most positive effects of roads on animals.

== Mitigation measures ==
=== Driver behavior ===
Studies have found that reducing the speed at which drivers travel along the road produces less noise, potentially reducing the road's barrier effect. The reduction in noise coming from the highway is assumed to make the road surface less intimidating for animals, potentially allowing crossings to take place. This increase in crossings, however, may result in a subsequent increase in animal-vehicle collisions.

=== Animal movement ===
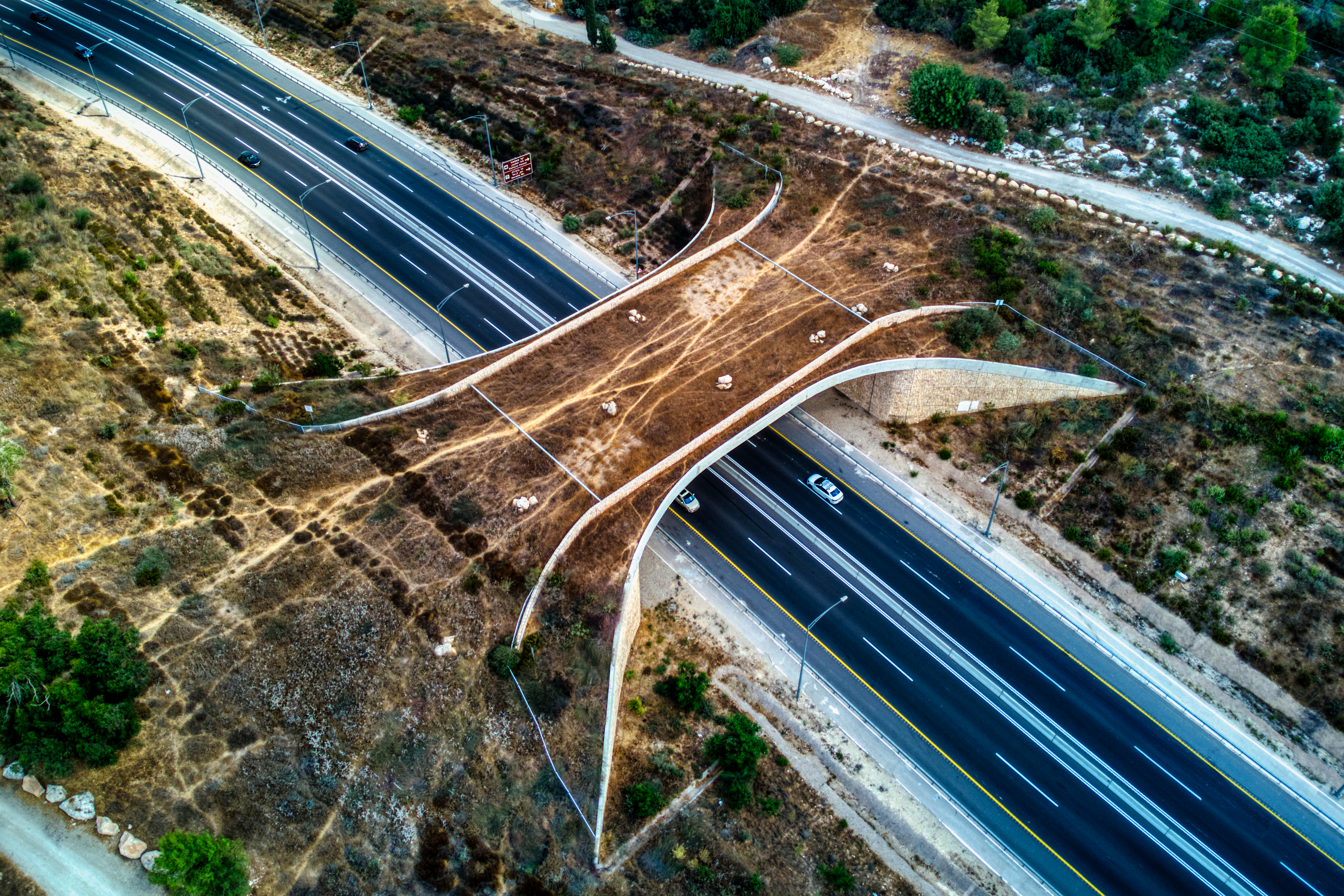
A wildlife overpass built over Highway 38 in Israel

Wildlife crossings, such as wildlife overpasses or underpasses, are generally seen as the most effective mitigation measure to help make roads more passable for wildlife while increasing both driver and animal safety. To funnel wildlife towards these crossings, many studies have called for a combination of both wildlife crossings and exclusion fencing, making the crossings under or over the road the only available path for wildlife. With a combination of both wildlife crossings and suitable lengths of fencing, the barrier effect of roads is expected to decrease, allowing animals to access both sides of the road and therefore allowing for important life cycle processes including migration and mating.
