= Social impact assessment =

Reviews infrastructure and development

Social impact assessment (SIA) is a methodology to review the social effects of infrastructure projects and other development interventions. Although SIA is usually applied to planned interventions, the same techniques can be used to evaluate the social impact of unplanned events, for example, disasters, demographic change, and epidemics. SIA is important in applied anthropology, as its main goal is to deliver positive social outcomes and eliminate any possible negative or long term effects.

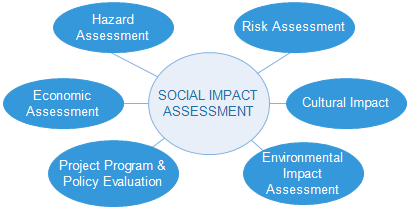

== Overview ==
The origins of SIA largely derives from the environmental impact assessment (EIA) model, which first emerged in the 1970s in the U.S. In the United States under the National Environmental Policy Act. Social impact assessments are federally mandated and performed in conjunction with environmental impact assessments. SIA has been incorporated into the formal planning and approval processes in several countries, to categorize and assess how major developments may affect populations, groups, and settlements. Though the social impact assessment has long been considered subordinate to the environmental impact assessment, new models, such as the Environmental Social Impact Assessment (ESIA), take a more integrated approach where equal weight is given to both the social and environmental impact assessments.

Although the Social Impact Assessment is recognized and used as a methodology, to review its social effects on industry projects. The term SIA is more widely known in most European countries, whereas in North America, the term Cultural impact is more widely used. Cultural and social terms were first seen to describe a branch of anthropology. There are no significant differences between the two however, both terms overlap each other to a certain extent. ‘Cultural Anthropology’ as mentioned is more commonly used in the US, its term is well known to the early works of American anthropologists. Some of the most prominent figures include Franz Boas and Ruth Benedict, they have both have stressed that unity in cultures through their language, behavior, ideologies, and material creations. On the other hand, ‘Social Anthropology’ is a term developed over the 20th century primarily in Britain. Their emphasis on what social anthropology is, is based on social relationships. Although it is based more on a theoretical approach just like cultural anthropology; its emphasis is understanding the social impacts and relations in a particular society.

== Social Impact Assessment ==
Social impact assessments are used to identify and manage the social impacts of industrial projects. These SIA can also be linked to Environmental impact assessments where policies, planning, and programming need to be implemented. Examples of social impact assessments include looking at how people live in a society (kinship or nuclear setting), culture, community, medical knowledge, and political systems. These examples showcase the emphasis on the environment and its effect on social impact. Applied anthropologists generally in SIA's identify and mitigate: who are the stakeholders, community, housing, workforce, health, and industry content. In SIA's, one needs to identify the stakeholders, the type of communities who will be impacted in a positive or negative manner. Collecting data is also an expected task by looking at indigenous communities, culture, key industries, etc. Explaining methods that will be used in your SIA, Identifying possible direct social impacts as well as the time frame of these impacts, and lastly providing government legislation and policies that related to the SIA. Just like with SIA, culture impact assessment (CIA) is essentially the same term and methodology as SIA. The only real difference is the fact that depending on what country you are in that they use the terms Social Impact Assessment (SIA) or Culture Impact Assessment (CIA). There are initially ten steps that one takes to do an effective social impact assessment, as advised by The Guidelines and Principles For Social Impact Assessment.

=== Steps of an effective SIA ===
1. Formulate a public plan or policy that involves all potential parties.
2. Describe what your public plan is or policy .
3. Describe the environment or area specific to your public plan or policy and its conditions.
4. After you have formulated your practical understanding of your proposal, recognize the potential social impacts will be communicated to those who are affected.
5. Identify the potential social impacts.
6. Establish the consequences of social impacts.
7. Identify future impacts and growing social impacts.
8. Plan an alternative public plan or policy and its outcomes.
9. Formulate a mitigating plan.
10. Formulate a program that monitors every aspect of the plan.

=== Other methodologies and tools ===
- IMMPACT Model
- OECD guide
- Seedkit

== Emerging Trends in Social Impact Assessment ==
Recent scholarship has identified several emerging trends in the field of Social Impact Assessment (SIA) that are broadening its scope and improving its applicability:

- Community-based and regional planning approaches: SIA is increasingly being used not just for discrete projects, but within regional and urban planning to build community resilience, reduce risks, and integrate governance and institutional dimensions. Imperiale and Vanclay (2024) argue for a paradigm shift from managing social impacts of projects to reducing the risks associated with projects and enhancing resilience in local communities.
- Technological innovations in measurement: New research explores how artificial intelligence, including generative AI tools, can help overcome limitations in current social impact measurement approaches (such as Social Return on Investment), improving data quality, scalability, and ethical evaluation.
- Climate vulnerability and adaptation: Studies of social vulnerability to climate change provide frameworks for integrating exposure, sensitivity, and adaptive capacity into impact assessments. For example, a coastal communities study in Water (2023) examines how evolving vulnerability indices reflect socioeconomic, historical, and political factors, offering more equitable analysis in SIA contexts.
- Social impacts in circular economy transitions: A systematic review of 60 studies published in Sustainability assesses how social aspects have been considered in circular economy (CE) research. It finds that while many studies attend to worker health and safety, fair wages, and training, far fewer address impacts on marginalized stakeholders, community acceptance, or work transitions; it also underscores the need to harmonize social indicators for S-LCA across CE contexts.

== See also ==
- B Corporation
- Economic impact analysis
- Life Cycle Thinking
- Social return on investment
- Stakeholder analysis
- Systems thinking
- Social earnings ratio
- True cost accounting
