= Linear infrastructure intrusions =

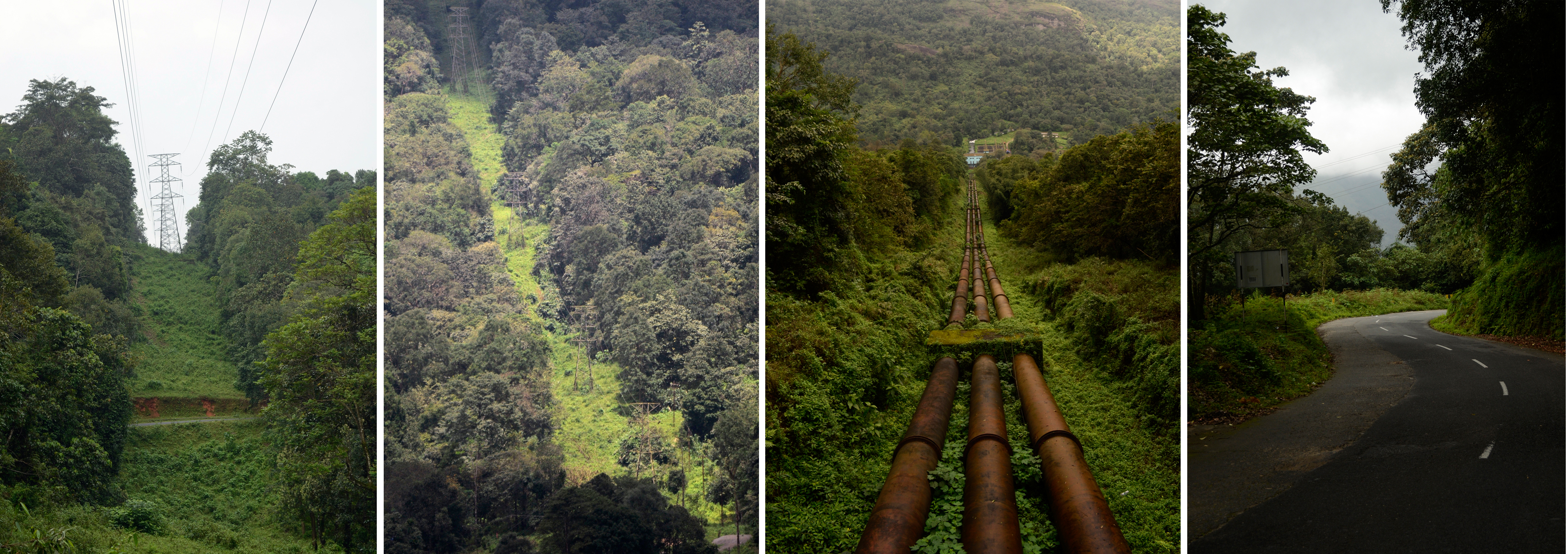
Electric power transmission lines, pipelines, and roads as linear infrastructure intrusions in natural areas

Linear infrastructure intrusions into natural ecosystems are man-made linear infrastructure such as roads and highways, electric power lines, railway lines, canals, pipelines, firebreaks, and fences. These intrusions cause linear opening through the habitat or breakage in landscape connectivity due to infrastructure creation and maintenance, which is known to have multiple ecological effects in terrestrial and aquatic ecosystems. These effects include habitat loss and fragmentation, spread of invasive alien species, desiccation, windthrow, fires, animal injury and mortality (e.g., roadkill), changes in animal behaviour, pollution, microclimate and vegetation changes, loss of ecosystem services, increased pressures from development, tourism, hunting, garbage disposal, and associated human disturbances. These intrusions, considered crucial infrastructure for economic sectors such as transportation, power, and irrigation, may also have negative social impacts on indigenous and rural people through exposure to novel social and market pressures, loss of land and displacement, and iniquitous distribution of costs and benefits from infrastructure projects. The study of the ecological effects of linear infrastructure intrusions has spawning sub-fields of research such as road ecology and railroad ecology.

== Habitat loss and fragmentation ==
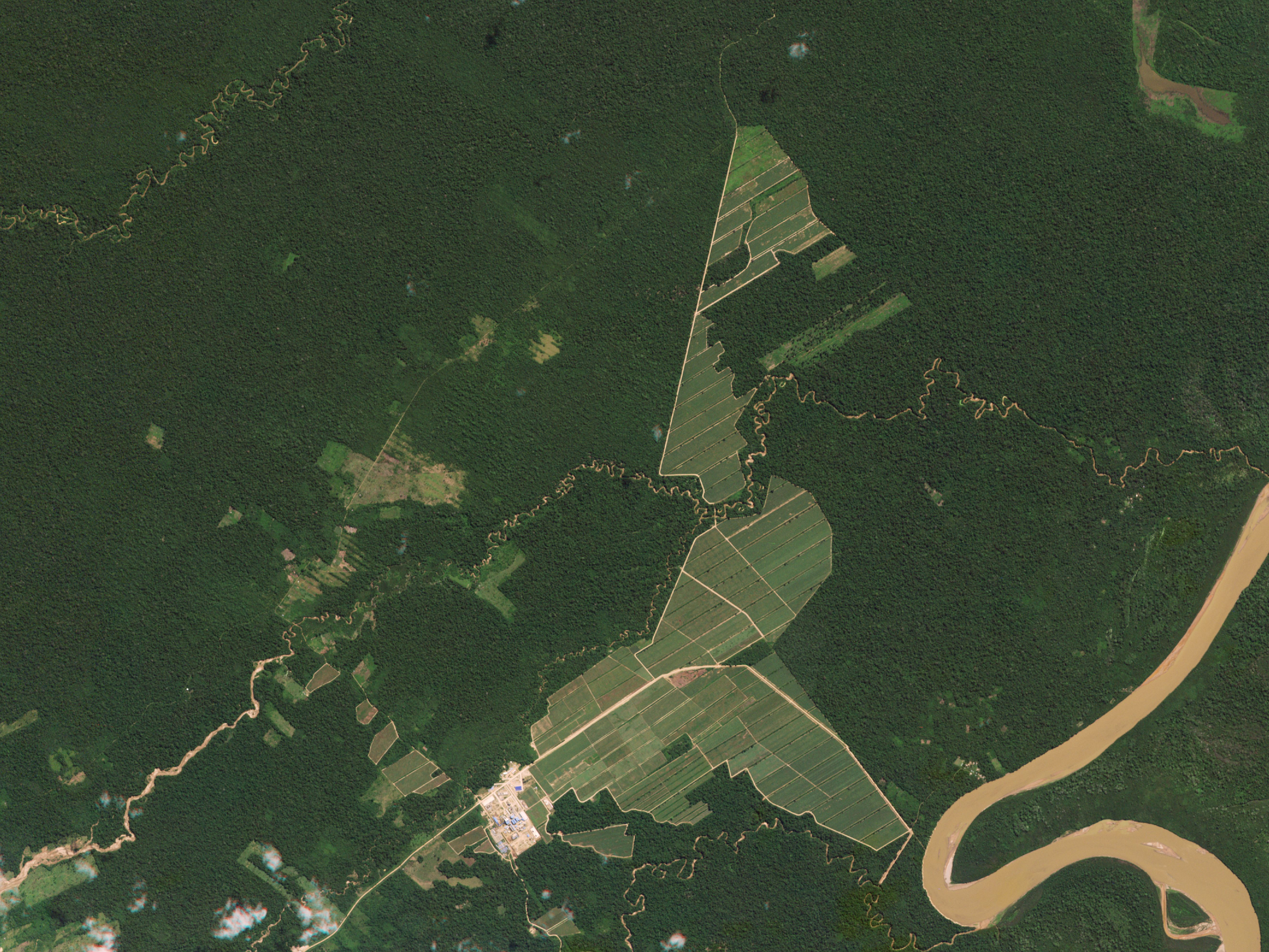
Deforestation in Bolivia, seen from satellite, showing typical "fishbone" pattern.

Establishment and maintenance of roads and highways causes direct loss of habitat because it involves clearing of trees and other vegetation, cutting and dumping of soil and excavated materials, movement of heavy vehicles and earth-movers, and establishment of worker settlements. Besides immediate effects of these disturbances, roads and other linear infrastructure intrusions may cause changes that may persist in the landscape for years to decades. In tropical rainforests in Amazonia and other parts of the world, satellite imagery reveals roads to have contributed to a 'fish-bone' pattern of ramifying habitat loss. In the Garo Hills in Meghalaya, an area of 456 ha of biodiversity-rich forest was lost to roads between 1971 and 1991.

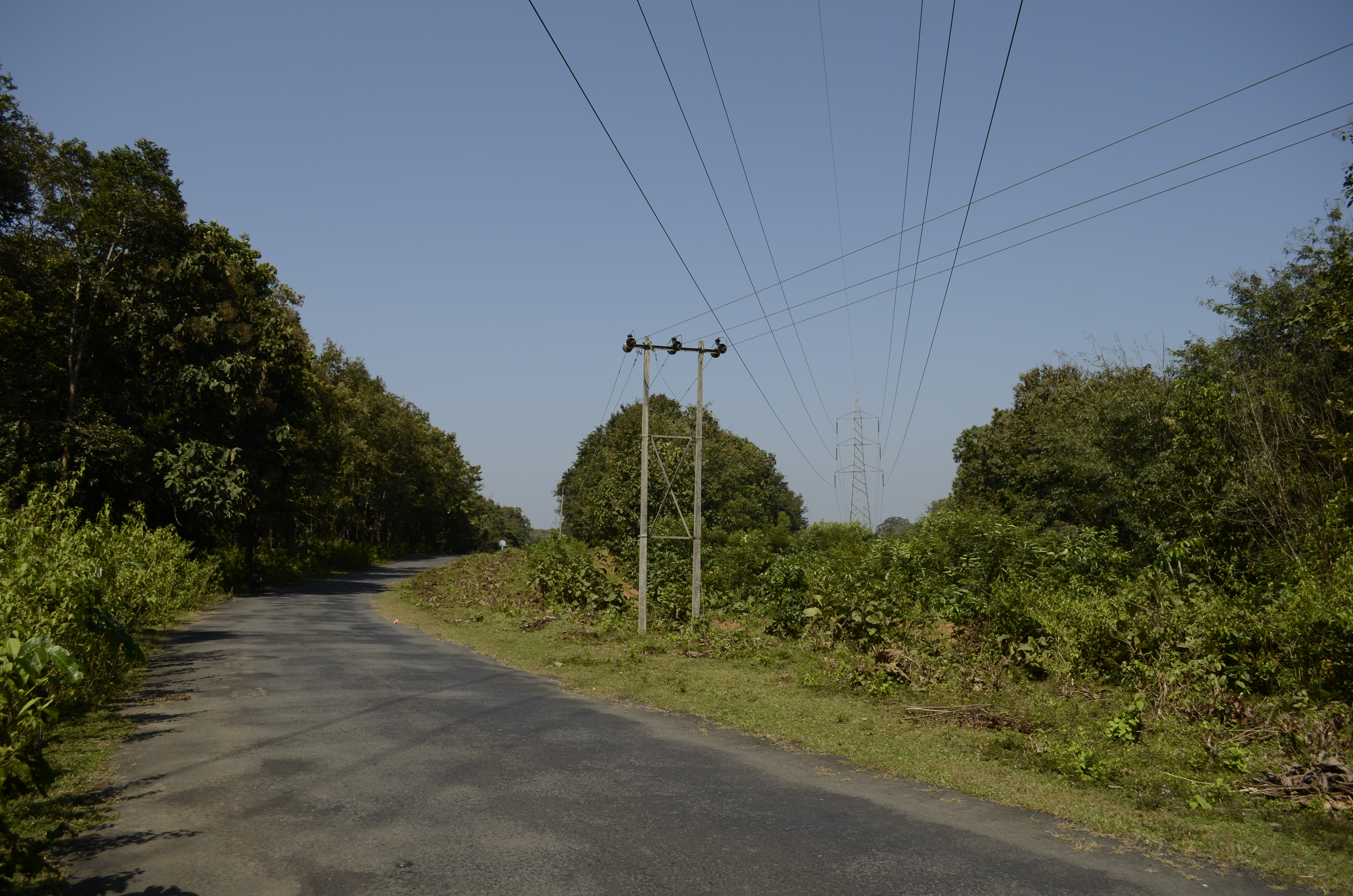
Roads and powerlines cause direct forest loss and edge effects

Loss of tree cover and its effects may be significant in wildlife reserves. In four tiger reserves in Karnataka, a geographic information system analysis revealed a high road density of around 1 km of forest road per square kilometre of forest, increasing in the tourism zone in Bandipur Tiger Reserve to 2.25 km of road per square kilometre of forest. Taking just the 800 km of road in Bandipur Tiger Reserve (Gubbi 2010), and assuming an average width of 10 m of the road itself, this translates into 800 hectares (8 km^{2}) of direct habitat loss.

Vegetation clearing along and on either side of the linear infrastructure intrusion for maintenance, visibility, or as 'viewlines' within wildlife reserves, contributed to further habitat loss, disturbance, and associated effects. One study from southern India, found that tree death is 250% higher along roads than forest interior. Physical and biotic effects such as weed invasion and tree death are added edge effects spreading on either side of the cleared area. Tropical forests experience greater diurnal fluctuations in light, temperature, and humidity within 50 – 100 m of edges that are typically drier and hotter than forest interiors. As a result, elevated tree mortality, numerous canopy gaps and a proliferation of disturbance-adapted vines, weeds, and pioneer species may occur along edges. Thus, an area about 100 m wide may be affected along intrusions such as roads, with each kilometre of road affecting about 10 ha of habitat (comparable figures for federal highways in the US are 13.5 ha per km of road).

== Wildlife mortality and impacts on populations ==
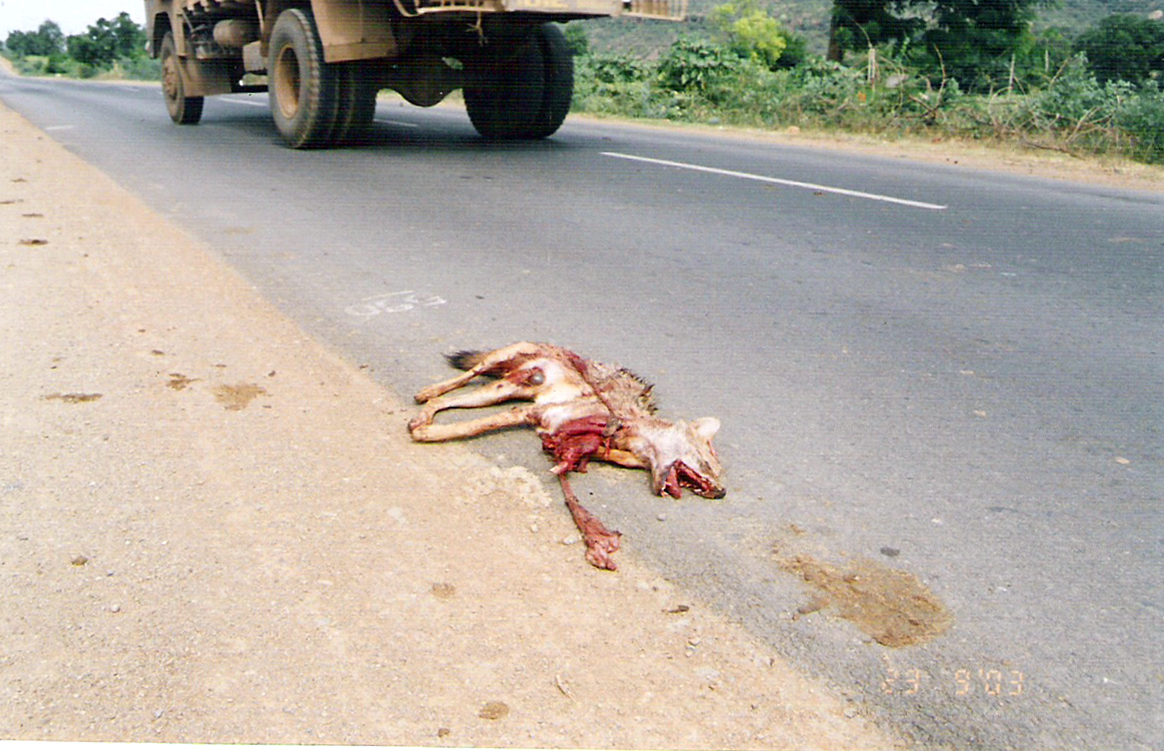
Jackal roadkill, India

Mortality of wildlife in natural ecosystems is one of the direct impacts of linear infrastructure intrusions. This occurs in a variety of ways: roadkill (or wildlife – vehicle collisions, WVC) in the case of roads and highways, electrocution along power lines, drowning in irrigation canals, and impalement or snagging on fences. Animals may also be killed during construction of the infrastructure, earthwork and annual maintenance operations, which may particularly affect slow-moving and burrowing species such as turtles, snakes, and soil fauna. Plant and animal mortality may also be caused by road construction equipment. Wildlife mortality may have several consequences on animal populations in the vicinity of linear infrastructures. Disruptions caused by linear infrastructure may increase negative human – wildlife interactions (conflicts) involving species such as wild elephants and large carnivores thereby leading to additional mortality. The effects may result in reduced wildlife population densities or avoidance of areas close to linear infrastructure. A review of studies found mammal and bird population densities declined with their proximity to infrastructure, with the influence of infrastructure on bird populations extending up to about 1 km, and effects on mammal populations up to about 5 km.

=== Roadkills or wildlife – vehicle collisions ===
Roadkill surveys reveal that a wide variety of species are killed ranging from invertebrates and herpetofauna to many birds and mammals, including large mammals such as elephants, deer, and carnivores such as tiger and leopard. Studies from southern India have found road mortality of dozens of animal species, including invertebrates, amphibians, reptiles, birds, and mammals. Along roads in Brazil, a range of mammal species are known to be killed along roads including crab-eating fox, capybara, maned wolf, and jaguar, with a 3-year study recording roadkills of 40 bird species, 24 mammal species and 8 reptile species along the BR-040 highway. The majority of studies of roadkill are from areas with wild habitats, but a 2-year in north India showed 33 species of vertebrates (amphibians, reptiles, birds and mammals) being killed in a 20-km stretch of road located within an agricultural landscape.

Studies from tropical forest regions suggest that reptiles and amphibians are numerically amongst the most frequently road-killed taxa. In Sharavathi river basin in India, a study estimated an amphibian kill rate on roads averaging about 10 kills/km per day on a National Highway during the monsoon. In contrast, birds and mammals may be killed more frequently than herpetofauna along roads through grassland and scrubland habitats or in landscape dominated by open pastures as in New South Wales.

=== Electrocution due to powerlines ===
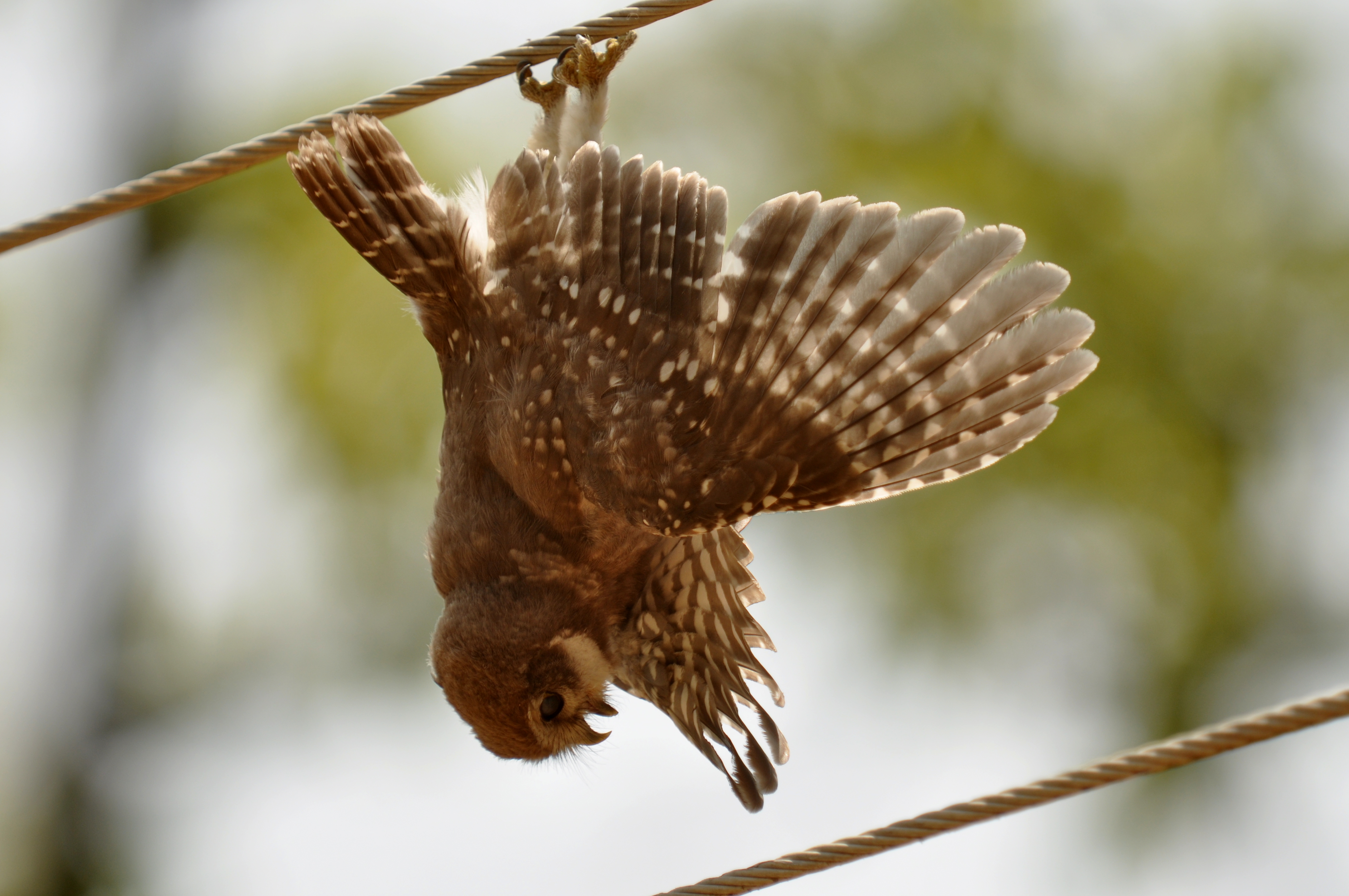
Spotted owlet electrocuted on a power line

Mortality of wildlife species due to collisions with power lines and electrocution is reported for a large diversity of bird species and also large mammals such as Asian elephants. In north India, deaths due to electricity wires killed Sarus Cranes at the rate of 1% of the population annually suggesting that wires can cause significant levels of mortality of individual species. A study from the Karoo, South Africa, found high-voltage transmission lines and low-voltage distribution lines killed thirty bird species, with Ludwig's bustards comprising 69% and other bustards (including Kori bustards) a further 18% of 679 carcasses found. This study reported higher collision rates on transmission lines (1.12 bustards/km/yr) than on distribution lines (0.86 bustards/km/yr), but the latter probably kill more birds as the smaller distribution lines are four times as extensive in South Africa.

== Genetic effects ==
Linear intrusions like roads and highways by disrupting dispersal and movement of animals may affect gene flow and genetic structure of populations. A review noted that several studies have reported negative effects of roads on genetic diversity and genetic differentiation, especially for some large mammals and amphibian species. This was despite the fact that most roads and highways were relatively recently been built or been in existence only for a few generations.

== Landslides and soil erosion ==
Linear infrastructure intrusions may cause landslides and soil erosion, particularly on steep and mountainous terrain. In southeast Asian tropical forests, roads on steep terrain contribute the largest surface erosion and landslide losses (per unit area disturbed) compared to other land uses. Landslide and surface erosion fluxes are typically ten to more than 100 times higher compared to undisturbed forests. In the Indian Himalaya, roads, road-building, and dumping of debris lead to loss of forest cover, increasing erosion, and creating a need for further maintenance. Roadside natural vegetation in forests play a role in slope stabilization, thereby accounting for a negative correlation between forest cover and landslide activity in the region. In humid tropical forests of Puerto Rico, landslide frequency within 85 m on either side of a road was 30 landslides per square kilometre, which was five times higher than the study area background frequency of about six landslides per square kilometre.
