= Barrier effect (disambiguation) =

The barrier effect is the phenomenon by which roads, highways, or railways impede the natural movement of animals.

Barrier effect may also refer to:

- Barrier effect (climatology), the process by which mountains block the passage of rain-producing weather systems.
- Barrier effect (microbiology), the effect probiotic bacteria have to reduce the binding space for pathogens.
- Barrier effect (food technology), the objective of using coatings to prevent water migration between food layers.

== See also ==
- All pages containing "barrier effect"
