= Gerhard Herzberg Canada Gold Medal for Science and Engineering =

- Awarded for: Continued excellence and influence in research
- Country: Canada
- Presented by: Natural Sciences and Engineering Research Council
- Eligibility: Scientists or engineers working at a university, government or private laboratory
- First award: 1991
- Final award: 2024

Highlights
- Total: 35
- Total recipients: 35
- Website: https://www.nserc-crsng.gc.ca/Prizes-Prix/Herzberg-Herzberg/Index-Index_eng.asp

The Gerhard Herzberg Canada Gold Medal for Science and Engineering is awarded by the Natural Sciences and Engineering Research Council (NSERC) of Canada to recognize "research contributions characterized by both excellence and influence." Prior to 2000, NSERC had awarded the Canada Gold Medal for Science and Engineering, before deciding to rename the award to honour Gerhard Herzberg, winner of the 1971 Nobel Prize in Chemistry.

The Herzberg medal is commonly called Canada's top award for science and engineering. It is an individual annual award that recognizes continued excellence and influence in research in either natural sciences or engineering. The award is a gold medal, and the guarantee of $1 million over five years to use for personal research.

== About the award ==
NSERC's Canada Gold Medal for Science and Engineering was first awarded in 1991 to Raymond Lemieux, a chemist working at University of Alberta. Mathematician James Arthur from the University of Toronto was the 1999 recipient, the last year before the award was renamed in honour of Gerhard Herzberg, the winner of the 1971 Nobel Prize in Chemistry. NSERC decided to rename the award after Herzberg because they felt he embodied the two main qualities of the award, namely research contributions that are of high quality and influential.

The Herzberg medal is awarded to a scientist or engineer working at a facility in Canada. It is considered Canada's top award for science and engineering. Eligible facilities include universities, government and private labs. Nominations can be submitted by any Canadian citizen or permanent resident. The winner is chosen by a selection committee representing different scientific disciplines, who make a recommendations to the current NSERC president. The award consists of a gold medal, and the guarantee of at least $1 million to use for research or for establishing research chairs, fellowships or scholarships in the recipients' name.

== Recipients ==
Year	Recipient	Affiliation	Field
1991	Raymond Lemieux	University of Alberta	Chemistry
1992	William Fyfe	The University of Western Ontario	Earth Sciences
1993	Pierre Deslongchamps	Université de Sherbrooke	Chemistry
1994	Alan Davenport	University of Western Ontario	Civil Engineering
1995	Peter Hochachka	University of British Columbia	Zoology
1996	Stephen Hanessian	Université de Montréal	Chemistry
1997	Keith Brimacombe	University of British Columbia	Metallurgical Engineering
1998	Keith Ingold	National Research Council	Chemistry
1999	James Arthur	University of Toronto	Mathematics
2000	Howard Alper	University of Ottawa	Chemistry
2001	David Schindler	University of Alberta	Biology
2002	Tito Scaiano	University of Ottawa	Chemistry
2003	Arthur McDonald	Queen's University	Physics
2004	John P. Smol	Queen's University	Biology
2005	David Dolphin	University of British Columbia	Biochemistry
2006	Richard Bond	University of Toronto	Astrophysics
2007	John Polanyi	University of Toronto	Chemistry
2008	Paul Corkum	University of Ottawa; National Research Council	Physics
2009	Gilles Brassard	Université de Montréal	Computer Science
2010	Geoffrey Hinton	University of Toronto	Artificial Intelligence
2011	W. Richard Peltier	University of Toronto	Earth Sciences
2012	Stephen Cook	University of Toronto	Computer Sciences
2013	W. Ford Doolittle	Dalhousie University	Biochemistry
2014	No 2014 Medal	(Realignment - The prize is now attributed to the year in which it is announced)	
2015	Axel Becke	Dalhousie University	Chemistry
2016	Victoria Kaspi	McGill University	Astrophysics
2017	Jeff Dahn	Dalhousie University	Physics
2018	Lewis E. Kay	University of Toronto	Biochemistry
2019	Barbara Sherwood Lollar	University of Toronto	Geology
2020	Molly Shoichet	University of Toronto	Biomedical Engineering
2021	Sajeev John	University of Toronto	Physics
2022	Lenore Fahrig	Carleton University	Biology
2023	Yoshua Bengio	University of Montreal	Computer Science
2024	Kerry Rowe	Queen’s University	Civil Engineering
2025	David S. Wishart	University of Alberta	Biological Sciences Computing Science

== Award of Excellence ==
From 2002 until 2009, three finalists were selected for the Herzberg Medal, and the winner selected from among them. The other two finalists (if it was their first time as a finalist) were awarded NSERC's Award of Excellence.

== See also ==
Canadian Association of Physicists#CAP Herzberg Medal
