= Social return on investment =

Method for measuring extra-financial value of an investment

Social return on investment (SROI) is a principles-based method for measuring extra-financial value (such as environmental or social value) not otherwise reflected or involved in conventional financial accounts. The method can be used by any entity to evaluate impact on stakeholders, identify ways to improve performance, and enhance the performance of investments.

The SROI method as it has been standardized by Social Value UK, formerly called the Social Return on Investment (SROI) Network, provides a consistent quantitative approach to understanding and managing the impacts of a project, business, organisation, fund or policy. It accounts for stakeholders' views of impact, and puts financial 'proxy' values on all those impacts identified by stakeholders which do not typically have market values. The aim is to include the values of people that are often excluded from markets in the same terms as used in markets, that is money, in order to give people a voice in resource allocation decisions.

A network was formed in 2008 to facilitate the continued evolution of the method. Globally, there are some 2000 members of this network, called Social Value International (formerly the SROI Network).

== Development ==
While the term SROI exists in cost–benefit analysis (CBA), a methodology for calculating social return on investment in the context of social enterprise was first documented in 2000 by REDF, formerly the Roberts Enterprise Development Fund. This is a San Francisco-based philanthropic fund which makes long-term grants available to organizations that run businesses for social benefit. Since then the approach has evolved to take into account developments in corporate sustainability reporting as well as development in the field of accounting for social and environmental impact. Interest has been fuelled by the increasing recognition of the importance of metrics to manage impacts that are not included in traditional profit and loss accounts, and the need for these metrics to focus on outcomes over outputs. While SROI builds upon the logic of cost-benefit analysis, it is different in that it is explicitly designed to inform the practical decision-making of enterprise managers and investors focused on optimizing their social and environmental impacts. By contrast, cost-benefit analysis is a technique rooted in social science that is most often used by funders outside an organization to determine whether their investment or grant is economically efficient, although economic efficiency also encompasses social and environmental considerations.

In 2002, the Hewlett Foundation's Blended Value Project was brought forward by a group of practitioners from the US, Canada, UK and Netherlands who had been implementing SROI analyses together to draft an update to the methodology. A member of this group coauthored a guidance-style article in the California Management Review on the subject around this time. A larger group met again in 2006 to do another revision which was published in 2006 in the book Social Return on Investment: a Guide to SROI. New Economics Foundation in the UK began exploring ways in which SROI could be tested and developed in a UK context, publishing a DIY Guide to Social Return on Investment in 2007.

The UK government's Office of the Third Sector and the Scottish Government commissioned a project beginning in 2007 which continues to develop guidelines that allow social businesses seeking government grants to account for their impact using a consistent, verifiable method. This resulted in another formal revision to the method, produced by a consortium led by Social Value UK, published in the 2009 Guide to SROI, since updated in 2012.

Developments in the UK led to agreement between Social Value International and Social Value UK on eight principles. These are:

- Involve stakeholders.
- Understand what changes.
- Value the things that matter.
- Only include what is material.
- Do not over-claim.
- Be transparent.
- Verify the result.
- Be responsive.

There is a strong emphasis on the first principle, involving stakeholders.

The third principle, 'Value the things that matter', includes the use of financial proxies and monetisation of value, and is unique to the SROI approach. These eight principles were renamed "Social Value Principles" by Social Value International in 2017, and guidance standards for each are being produced.

Several software providers exist to support users to collect and manage data for SROI analysis.

In 2009–2010 proponents affiliated with Social Value UK proposed to establish linkages between SROI analysis and IRIS, an initiative to create a common set of terms and definitions for describing the social and environmental performance of an organization.

Some organisations that have used SROI have found it to be a useful tool for organizational learning.

== Primary purpose ==
While in financial management the term ROI refers to a single ratio, unlike Social Earnings Ratio (S/E Ratio), SROI analysis does not necessarily refer not to one single ratio but more to a way of reporting on value creation. It bases the assessment of value in part on the perception and experience of stakeholders, finds indicators of what has changed and tells the story of this change and, where possible, uses monetary values for these indicators. It is an emerging management discipline: a skill set for the measurement and communication of non-financial value. Therefore, the approach distinguishes between "SROI" and "SROI Analysis".

The latter implies: a) a specific process by which the number was calculated, b) context information to enable accurate interpretation of the number itself, and c) additional non-monetized social value and information about the number's substance and context.

== The Principles of Social Value ==
There are eight principles of SROI, referred to as the Principles of Social Value.

1. Involve stakeholders (i.e. everyone who has a 'stake' or an interest in the subject of the SROI)
Inform what gets measured and how this is measured and valued in an account of social value by involving stakeholders
2. Understand what changes (for those stakeholders)
Articulate how change is created and evaluate this through evidence gathered, recognising positive and negative changes as well as those that are intended and unintended.
3. Value the things that matter
Making decisions about allocating resources between different options needs to recognise the values of stakeholders. Value refers to the relative importance of different outcomes. It is informed by stakeholders' preferences.
4. Only include what is material
Establish the boundaries of what information and evidence must be included in an account of value to give a true and fair picture, and one that is based on the evidence from stakeholders so decisions taken focus on the changes that matter.
5. Do not over-claim
Only claim the value that activities are responsible for creating.
6. Be transparent
Demonstrate the basis on which the analysis may be considered accurate and honest, and show that it will be reported to and discussed with stakeholders.
7. Verify the result
Ensure appropriate independent assurance.

8. Be responsive (introduced in 2021)

Pursue optimum Social Value based on decision making that is timely and supported by appropriate accounting and reporting.

=== Monetisation principle ===
The translation of extra-financial value into monetary terms is considered an important part of SROI analysis by some practitioners, and problematic when it is made a universal requirement by others. Essentially, the monetisation principle assumes that price is a proxy for value.

While prices represent exchange value – the market price at which demand equals supply – they do not completely represent all the value to either the seller or the consumer. In other words, they do not capture economic surplus (consumer or producer surplus). They also do not include the positive or negative value (i.e., externalities) for others who may be affected by an exchange. Moreover, prices will depend in part on the distribution of income and wealth: different distributions result in different prices which result in different proxies for value. Hence market prices do not always accurately reflect what people value.

Proponents of SROI argue that using monetary proxies (market prices or other monetary proxies) for social, economic and environmental value offers several practical benefits:

- it makes it easier to align and integrate performance management systems with financial management systems;
- it aids communication with internal stakeholders, especially those responsible for finances and resource allocation, and with those who prefer quantitative to qualitative ways of learning;
- it induces transparency since it precipitates the clarification of which values have been included and which have not been included;
- it permits sensitivity analysis to show which assumptions are more important in that the result is more affected by changes in some assumptions than others;
- it helps identify the critical sources of value and so streamlines performance management.

Despite these benefits, on the down side there is concern that monetization lets a user of SROI analysis "off the hook" by too easily allowing comparison of the end number at the expense of understanding the actual method by which it was arrived at: thus a working paper by Arvidson et al (2010) "aims to encourage greater rigour and attention to how SROI principles are applied".

== Further applications ==
The SROI methodology has been further adapted for use in planning and prioritization of climate change adaptation and development interventions. For example, the Participatory Social Return on Investment (PSROI) framework builds on the economic principles of SROI and CBA and integrates them with the theoretical and methodological foundations of participatory action research (PAR), critical systems thinking, and Resilience Theory and strength-based approaches such as appreciative inquiry and asset-based community development to create a framework for the planning and costing of adaptation to climate change in agricultural systems.

PSROI thus represents the convergence of two theoretical tracks: adaptation prioritization, planning and selection, and the economics of adaptation. The main divergence, then, between SROI and PSROI is that while SROI typically analyzes pre-defined interventions, PSROI involves a participatory intervention prioritization process that is antecedent to SROI-style economic analyses.

== Potential limitations ==
- Benefits that cannot be monetised: There will be some benefits that are important to stakeholders but which cannot be monetised. An SROI analysis should not be restricted to one number, but seen as a framework for exploring an organisation’s social impact, in which monetisation plays an important but not an exclusive role.
- Focus on monetisation: One of the dangers of SROI is that people may focus on monetisation without following the rest of the process, which is crucial to proving and improving. Moreover, an organisation must be clear about its mission and values and understand how its activities impact on the world – not only what it does but also what difference it makes, and how it makes a difference. This clarity informs stakeholder engagement. Therefore, if an organisation seeks to monetise its impact without having considered its mission and stakeholders, then it risks choosing inappropriate indicators; and as a result the SROI calculations can be of limited use or even misconstrued.
- Some outcomes not easily associated with monetary value: Some outcomes and impacts (for example, increased self-esteem, improved family relationships) cannot be easily associated with a monetary value. In order to incorporate these benefits into the SROI ratio proxies for these values would be required. SROI analysis is a developing area and as SROI evolves it is possible that methods of monetising more outcomes will become available and that there will be increasing numbers of people using the same proxies. Arvidson et al. note the difficulty with valuing volunteering inputs and outputs: "the question of how to value volunteering in SROI is debated, and valuing volunteering is problematic both conceptually and practically."
- Exaggerating the result: When participants expect SROI greater than 100% and when the observation coverage involves a huge project with numerous stakeholders, who genuinely believe the result was greater by minimizing the contributions of their partner. The Waterloo STEAM Academy advocates for discounting future benefits as a way to avoid exaggeration of results. This is to create a common limit on unrealized potential benefits
- SROI is time- and resource-intensive: it is most easily used when an organisation is already measuring the direct and longer-term results of its work with people, groups, or the environment.

== Variations ==
Some SROI users employ a version of the method that does not require that all impacts be assigned a financial proxy. Instead the "numerator" includes monetized, quantitative but not monetized, qualitative, and narrative types of information about value. REDF argues that "new SROI" or "Next Generation SROI" needs to implement a streamlined system of data collection and analysis founded upon electronic data and automated processes, to avoid it remaining a resource-intensive process.

Organizations such as the Public Sector Network, promotes a Canadian approach which is similar to other global approaches that focuses on transferring the monetary asset to a for-profit corporation from a not-for-profit corporation. The Public Sector Network's article written by Hotsonyame differentiates not-for-profit and nonprofits explaining how a natural asset gap is created based on the ownership framework of not-for-profit entities. That gap is best expressed through asset sharing between a for-profit corporation and a not-for-profit corporation.

== See also ==
- Economic forecasting
- Happiness economics
- Social impact assessment
- Sustainable return on investment
- Sustainability measurement
- Stakeholder theory
