= Sustainable return on investment =

Sustainable return on investment (S-ROI) is a methodology for identifying and quantifying environmental, societal, and economic impacts of investment in projects and initiatives (e.g., factories, new product development, civil infrastructure, efficiency and recycling programs, etc.).

The goal of S-ROI is to make risk-opportunity assessments more robust by providing new visibility into intangible internal costs and benefits, and externalities - social, economic, and environmental effects that are typically not considered in traditional cash-oriented project planning.

Because it includes environmental impacts, S-ROI is distinct from the similarly named methodology of Social Return on Investment (SROI).

== Overview and cost types ==
A fundamental principle of S-ROI is the creation of monetized models of non-cash benefits and costs. Benefits might include emissions avoided, resources saved, or improvements in health and productivity, while costs could include adverse effects on public health, risk associated with rising costs for resources or disposal, or impacts of a project on nearby farms, fisheries, or tourism sites.

Quantifying these factors documents intangible values of an investment, and allows them to be incorporated into the decision-making process alongside traditional financial ROI metrics, providing additional insight, confidence, and transparency. S-ROI findings can also be used in support of requests for public or private funding of projects

Like its predecessor methodology, Total Cost Assessment (TCA), S-ROI considers five different cost types. The first two, Direct and Indirect Costs, are the same as in traditional ROI, and include benefits, such as revenue increases. The third cost type, Contingent Liabilities, includes risks (such as fines, penalties, clean-up, etc.) which are not certain, but are easy to see in a financial statement should they occur.

The last two cost types, Internal and External Intangibles are not easy to see in the financial statement, but represent real costs nonetheless. Internal costs are costs to the company, such as loss of brand value, or poor productivity stemming from low morale. External costs, also known as negative externalities, are costs to society, such as environmental degradation and effects on housing prices.

In all categories, S-ROI also considers benefits, a category that was ignored in TCA.

== History and evolution from Total Cost Assessment (TCA) ==
Sustainability Return on Investment (S-ROI) grew out of the Total Cost Assessment (TCA) methodology, codified by the American Institute of Chemical Engineers (AIChE). TCA was first considered by General Electric in the late 1980s for better selection and justification of waste-management investment decisions. The US and New Jersey Environmental Protection Agencies then commissioned the Tellus Institute to investigate and apply the methodology to several projects in the early 1990s.

While this work showed promise, members of the Center for Waste Reduction Technologies at the AIChE felt the method needed a better-defined protocol. A team of 13 industry experts worked with consultants from Arthur D. Little to develop a process for conducting a Total Cost Assessment and published a workbook describing the method in 2000. The initial methodology was designed to include direct and indirect environmental and safety costs into a corporate assessment of a decision. The methodology was devised by industry collaborators for use in industry and had a vetting period, during which the Chief Financial Officers (CFOs) of Fortune 500 companies in the chemical industry were brought in to ensure the financial calculations met their stringent requirements.

Although the initial methodology had a narrow scope and focus, practitioners have found that the basic method can be applied beyond environmental and safety costs to include health risks, societal costs, and benefits in all categories.

Several practitioners and government and industry partners continued the development of the methodology to include benefits and the multi-stakeholder perspective that are included in the S-ROI concept.

== Process and applications ==
An initial data-gathering phase typically involves concurrent dialog with stakeholders inside and outside the project-planning organization, or proxies for these groups, to identify types of impacts from the project under consideration. Examples of stakeholders for a factory project could include employees, suppliers, area residents, emergency responders, and local government. It is important in this process that stakeholders hear what other stakeholders and the decision-maker are saying, to foster mutual understanding and create otherwise-impossible arrangements that satisfy the needs of the most-critical groups (i.e., to optimize the decision).

Stakeholder inputs are used to quantify uncertainties and evaluate benefits and costs under different scenarios.

These findings can then be incorporated into a probabilistic modeling process to systematically identify possible events that could affect an investment's payback, assess the consequences, and identify opportunities for optimizing overall outcomes. A Net Present Value (NPV) assessment can be made for each stakeholder, using Monte Carlo analysis to generate best-case, worst-case, and most-likely assessments of an investment's profitability.

One example would be the possible replacement of a dangerous chemical with a more benign alternative. The S-ROI process can evaluate possible effects of industrial accidents, including the risk of fines, lawsuits, and damage to brand reputation and employee relations. These types of analyses can show whether preventive measures like extra training or redundant safety systems create an unnecessary burden or provide payback through risk reduction.

Other examples are S-ROI of waste to energy facilities and implementation of a system for recycling waste generated during the production of concrete for construction projects. The S-ROI analysis assessed payback by analyzing up-front and operational costs, cost savings from reduced water usage and waste disposal, and potential scalability of the program.

The S-ROI method can also be used to explore broader issues. Dow Chemical has used S-ROI, and its precursor TCA, to assess its 10-year sustainability goals over the last three cycles. The assessment helps the company justify what might seem to be low-return policies and select and optimize goals for the best return to all stakeholders.
