= Social earnings ratio =

The social earnings ratio, sometimes abbreviated to S/E, is a single-number metric, used to measure the social impact of various organizations. The non-financial metric is similar to the price-earnings ratio, but instead focuses on valuation against social impact, rather than projected earnings.

The ratio was founded in 2011 by Olinga Ta'eed and a team of financial experts, in order to find a way of measuring financial investment against real social impact. It began as a university collaboration in the United Kingdom, before becoming an internationally recognized form of measurement, when the CCEG was founded.

In 2013, it was identified in a news article as "the most rapidly adopted metric in the world".

== History ==
The Social Earnings Ratio (S/E) is a form of measuring sentiment and converting it into financial value. The ratio began as an idea to develop a single number metric to measure social value. In November 2011, a university collaboration was formed to manage this development. Around 18 months later, the Centre for Citizenship, Enterprise and Governance (CCEG) was formed in April 2013, to act as the standards body to curate the ratio globally. The standards body would be run as a non-profit. The Board for the CCEG was to include Professor Nick Petford, who was also the Vice-Chancellor at the University of Northampton.

Following the establishment of the CCEG, Olinga Ta'eed was the keynote speaker at the Global Citizen Forum. In early 2015, it was announced that Seratio would be launched as a spin-off organization to control the licensing of the Social Earnings Ratio platform. Barbara Mellish would be the CEO of Seratio.

By late 2015, the CCEG had over 37,500 members, including a number of key sustainability leaders. The UK Intellectual Property Office accepted the terms "Social Earnings Ratio", "S/E Ratio" and "Seratio" as having "acquired a distinctive character as a result of the use made of it." Full Registration rights have been granted. This is an important milestone for the Social Earnings Ratio which will allow it to achieve parity to the Price Earnings Ratio.

Serat.io was launched as a subsidiary project by the CCEG, for the measuring of personal value. Pre-launched at the Clipper Round the World Yacht Race in September 2015, PV targets 1 million users. It is a campaign backed by celebrities such as the former First Lady Cherie Blair, broadcaster Jonathan Dimbleby, Italian footballer Gianluigi Buffon, politician Rt Hon Peter Hain, as well as the Desmond Tutu Foundation. Personal Value was formally launched in December 2015.

== Algorithm ==
$$Total Value = Financial Value + NonFinancial Value = p/e + s/e$$

== Interpretation ==
S/E Ratio is a financial metric that converts sentiment into financial value, and purports to be the currency of intangible values.

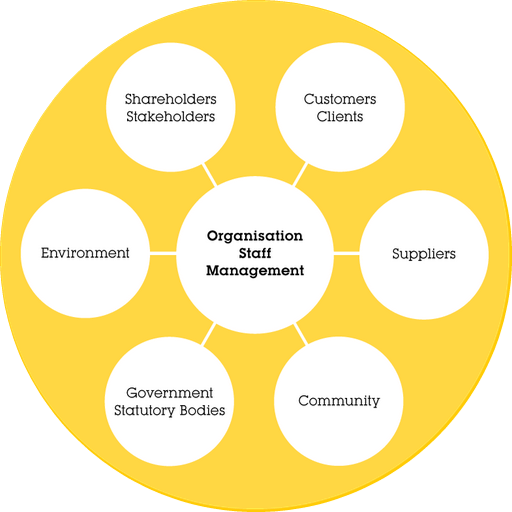
Citizenship Framework

The S/E utilises financial value data, claimed outcomes and independent verification within a Citizenship Framework. S/E provides digital articulation of value across micro, meso and macro levels. Regardless of the organisation or market that is measured, the same algorithm is used. In a similar way to comparative currency flow, it means that both simple and sophisticated correlations can easily be compared.

The ratio was developed using a university collaboration, involving over 90 universities globally. The framework examines the influences between the value formed at citizen, family, community, team, organisation, regional, national, and global levels. A principle rule is that S/E is never applied to negative actions. An example of this would be that slavery would never be measured directly, but it would be treated as a lack of freedom. Similarly, violence and safety levels wouldn't be measured, but the level of peace and its absence could be used in the framework.

Some have compared its application similar to that of a digital non-financial currency. The framework utilises deep academic analysis tools, which are commonly used for calculating the financial value. Since the initial collaboration between the United Kingdom universities, a number of interdependencies have been discovered.

=== Interdependencies ===
- Time dependency - Value changes over time
- Direction - Value changes depending on which stakeholder viewpoint is assessed
- The 1/r^{2} rule (Distance) - Value dilutes over increasing distance
- Multiplier effect - Enhancing, diminishing, neutral processes
- Tracking Movement - Transfer between stakeholders

=== Metrics ===
	Focus	Metric	Application
1	Institution	Organisational	UK Social Value Act 2012, Corporate CSR, NGO efficiency
2	Citizen	Personal Value	Recruitment, Social Media, Retail, Therapy
3	Slavery	Freedom	UK Modern Slavery Act 2015
4	Health	Wellbeing	Health, Corporate HR
5	Regional	Hyperlocality	Regional Government, Corporate CSR
6	Collaboration	Team	Clipper Round the World Yacht Race 2015
7	Ethics	Leadership	Mission Performance
8	Enablement	Independence	NHS integrated social and health care
9	Inspiration	Art	Arts Council
10	Impact	Investment	Sustainable investment
11	Intellectual	Capital	Universities, Corporate UK
12	Happiness	City	Local Government, Politics
13	Violence	Peace	Domestic Violence
14	Animal	Welfare	Pet industry
15	Tax	Avoidance	Corporate evasion
16	Pay	Equalities	Gender
17	Love	Relationship	Online dating
18	Retail	Consumer	b2c

== Reception ==
It is often difficult or not possible to compare Social Earnings Ratio with other forms of financial measurement. Comparing S/E to other social impact tools is something that is more common. Social Return on Investment (SROI) is one example of this and is quite a popular search on most search engines. When its results are compared to that of S/E's, its clear that SROI has a greater amount of coverage.

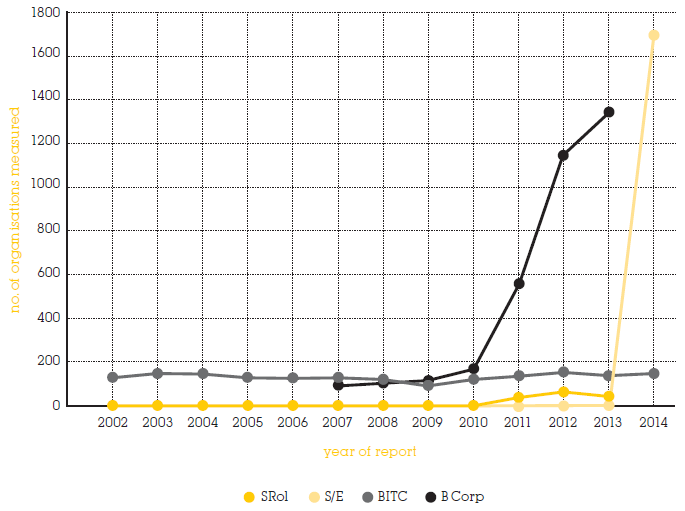
Social Impact Analysis by Metric (Lord Loomba) 2014

It could be argued that the history of SROI and the fact it was released in 2002, nine years prior to S/E, could indicate why it has a greater number of search engine results. Equally, HACT claims to "have created the largest bank of methodologically consistent and robust social values ever produced." By this they are referring to a database of financial proxy data which can be used in conjunction to SROI, although in August 2015 they have criticised SROI comprehensively in the "Seven Principle Problems of SROI." Continuing with the comparison, in 2014 Lord Loomba presented a report to the House of Lords, "Social Impact Analysis", which included metrics from Business in the Community and Benefit Corporation, as well as SROI and S/E. The steep rise in S/E take-up in 2013 represents the automation of the metric and not necessarily any indication of quality. A 'big-data' approach has been provided by CSR-Hub who have harvested 417 metrics; in May 2014 they announced an MoU with CCEG to explore S/E.

S/E has undergone considerable analysis and critique in recent years. Most recent comparing IIRC (International Integrated Reporting Council) to S/E, concluding "Together, the Framework and the S/E Ratio provide a powerful set of metrics and analysis for both founders and funders to evaluate value as well as strategic risk."

Earlier in 2015, The Guardian wrote: "Since 2013, there has certainly been an increase in the number of online measurement tools. But the challenge of calculating social impact goes back to the early 1990s. One measure, called LM3, allows organisations to calculate the local economic impact, while another, called SROI, calculates social return on investment. But both are very complex and are based on lots of assumptions that the people who do the evaluation will have to identify, agree and sign off." Perhaps we need a simpler tool such as the social earnings ratio, which doesn’t require lots of assumptions and is based on a one-size-fits-all approach."

The focus on the broad context of applications of S/E have drawn sometimes heated debate amongst the international academic and social innovation community in Italy, Romania, and Russia. Mohammad Yunus, a Nobel Prize laureate, has also spoken publicly about the framework. These discussions surrounding the concept of a 'universal metric' draw both praise and scepticism.

Criticism of the timeframes to calculate the data has been made, with many wondering how accurate statistics be drawn in such a short period of time. other debates about the usability of the framework are still forming, as S/E begins to become more prominent in the social measuring tools field. Some S/E exponents embrace the disruptive metric tag arguing it as an instrument for change, others debate the moral and potential future implications. There are a number of platforms discussing and organically developing S/E including a forum, a micro-blog, and an international journal in 8 languages, the Social Value & Intangibles Review.

== Application ==
The S/E makes use of Big Data, Social Media and Sentiment Analysis to automate the algorithm on a SaaS platform, with results normally reported within 10 seconds. Organisation's whose financials are available via XBRL, allows the framework to be applied without intervention. For the measurement of individual personal values can take up to 60 seconds to input and start reporting.

S/E Ratio can be applied across all organisational, institutional, and personal levels, as well as projects, processes, products in private, public, third (NGO, voluntary, civil society), and community sectors. This widespread approach is a key factor in its adoption in certain high profile applications which have gained it traction. S/E Ratio is the leading provider of metrics for delivery of public sector procurement under the UK Social Value Act 2012 legislation. Currently some UK£3.15 billion of public sector procurement is measured through the Social Earnings Ratio. The Lord Young Review (February 2015) of the Social Value Act described S/E as "The Centre for Citizenship, Enterprise and Governance (CCEG) has developed the social earnings ratio as a quick, low cost, high volume way to assess social impact. It is calculated by dividing the social value by the money spent on it. This can be calculated using very simple information (e.g. the CSR budget, the carbon reduction, and the number of people helped), and is meant to provide a single metric that can be used as a quick benchmark"

Seratio, the SaaS licensing arm of CCEG, announced that in Q1 2016 it will launch a Freedom metric to support the UK Modern Slavery Act 2015. This promotes Transparency in the Supply Chain for all companies over £36 million turnover - an estimated 12,000 companies need to comply to this new piece of legislation as from October 2015. CCEG chairs the EU Procurement Social Value & Transparency in Supply Chain Forum.

=== Corporate social responsibility ===
There is a propensity of non-financial value data covered by over 1000 different metrics and measures. There is remarkable lack of consistency between them. Due to the speed of S/E and its ability to translate empirical data from other metrics to an S/E score, it has harvested a significant database of organisational values reported. The EU SEiSMiC Social Value Group have charted growth and their 2015–16 forecasts for measured asset value (Euro € trillion) by S/E. Figures for 2015 and 2016 include other value measurements outside organisational value; the key differentiator presumably is personal value.
