= Roadkill hotspot =

Location with higher than expected wildlife-vehicle collisions

A roadkill hotspot or blackspot is an accumulation of roadkill along a given length of roadway with significantly more wildlife-vehicle collisions than expected to occur by chance, based on a normal distribution. Decision-makers can then authorize the construction of roadkill mitigation infrastructure based on roadkill hotspot locations, prioritizing those with the most roadkill in number or those for a particular target species for conservation. Roadkill hotspots vary spatially and temporally, depending on the scale, duration of monitoring, and both the species and season in question. They can be calculated using roadkill survey data; GPS coordinates of roadkill collected by researchers and highway maintenance personnel, or increasingly, civilian-reported data. Additionally, roadkill hotspots can be projected by using a model to ascertain probable locations; models typically use existing wildlife abundance, distribution, and mitigation data combined with landscape variables (distance to forest, wetland, grassland, road elevation, road width, speed limit, etc.) and climatic data (temperature, humidity, precipitation, etc.). Models are often used to determine the probable roadkill locations of ecologically sensitive animals or during the planning stages of a new road, it is noted that these locations may not align perfectly with sites of highest animal crossing attempts. Many academics stress the combined value of animal abundance and migration data with roadkill hotspots as a more assured way to ascertain the best locations to construct roadkill mitigation structures.

== Calculation and uses ==
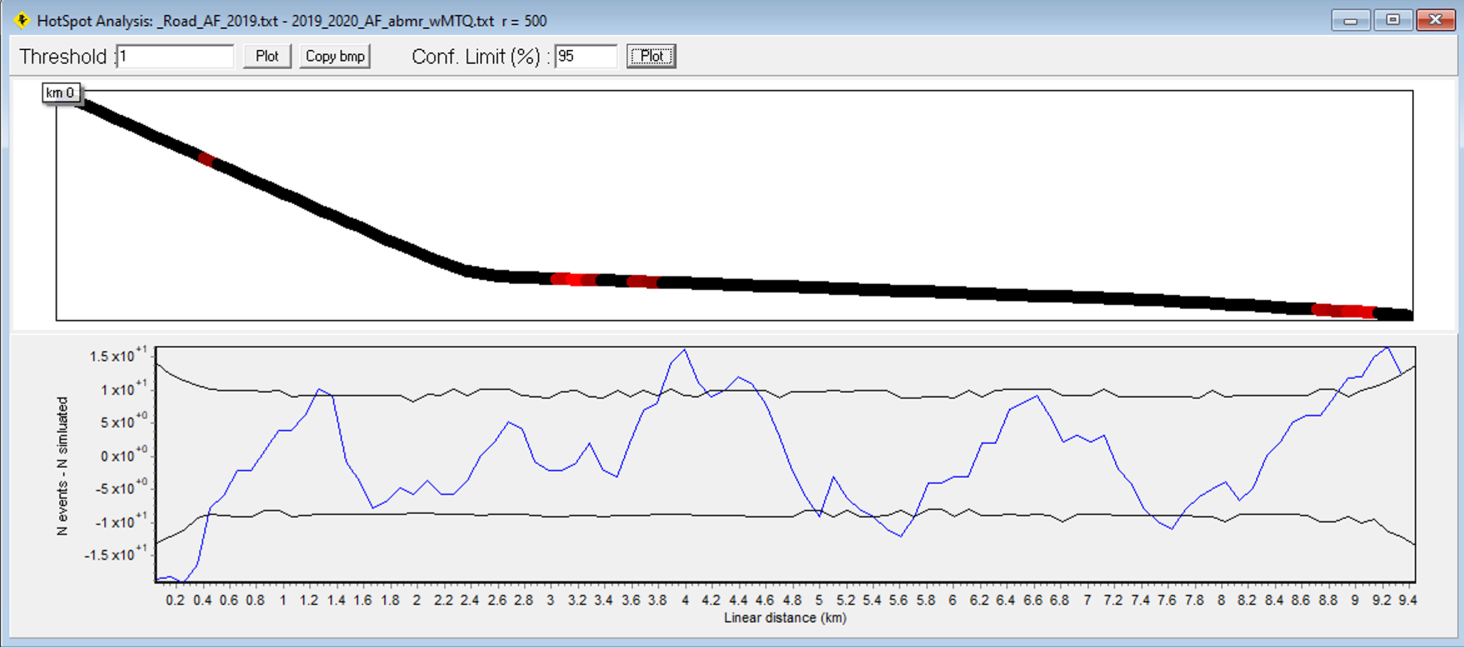
Roadkill Hotspot analysis, calculated in the freeware program Siriema, at a diameter scale of 1000m (radius of 500m). Areas in red represent roadkill hotspots, where calculated values (blue line) rises above the upper confidence interval (upper black line), set at 95%.

Roadkill hotspots can be calculated using Ripley's K statistical analysis, which evaluate dispersion of events on different scales, as well as employing various freeware programs, such as Siriema, used "to determine the scales on which road-kills were significantly aggregated in space." Roadkill hotspots are a useful by providing researchers and decision-makers with high-roadkill location. A strong anthropogenic effect, the results of wildlife-vehicle collisions claim hundreds of millions of animals per year, and the burden to mitigate ecological degradation often becomes the responsibility of governments. Roadkill hotspot locations can be prioritized by governments as areas to construct roadkill mitigating infrastructure (fencing, wildlife overpasses, wildlife crossing areas, reduced speed, etc.).

== Presence or absence of roadkill hotspots ==
The presence of roadkill hotspots calculated using roadkill GPS data in a given location does not always align with locations of the highest number of road-crossing attempts but instead represent sites of the highest number of unsuccessful road crossings, resulting in an area of higher animal mortality. It is possible that more animals are attempting a crossing somewhere else along the roadway and are more successful at doing so, for whatever reason.

Researchers stress that an absence of hotspots in a given area should not be taken as conclusive evidence for a lack of roadway effects among local animal populations. It is possible that roadway effects have already exhausted local animal populations, resulting in fewer roadkill. Some animals avoid the road, which creates a barrier effect and can lead to passive Often, an animal will live long enough after a wildlife-vehicle collision to make it off of the roadway and therefore go undetected. The detection of roadkill, or lack thereof, is a concern for researchers, as animal size generally favours detectability, resulting in roadkill hotspots of larger, easily-detected animals.

In instances where the target species for conservation has few remaining individuals, modelling can be employed to project hotspot locations, sites that can be prioritized for the construction of roadkill mitigation infrastructure. Fencing in these areas can aid in the recovery of animal populations.

A lack of a certain type of roadkill is a variable to consider– for example, many amphibian species are removed from roadways by scavengers within hours of wildlife-vehicle collisions and as a consequence, would not appear in road survey data (surveys that are conducted on a daily, weekly, or monthly basis).

=== Scale ===
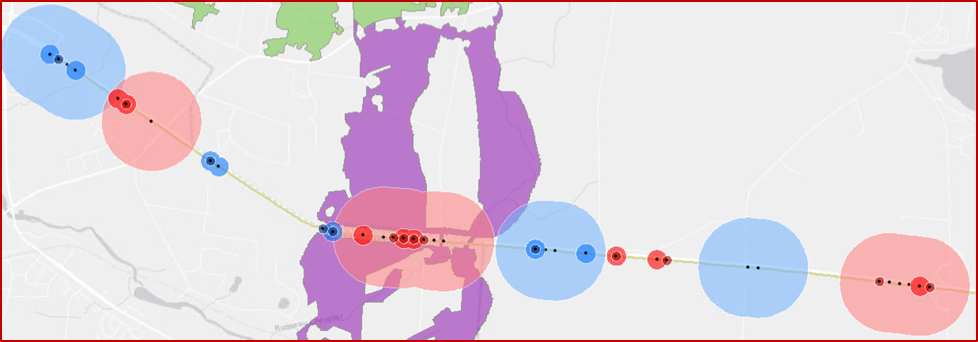
Siriema Roadkill Hotspot locations in Geographic Information System (GIS), with applicable scales as buffers in red (scales of 100m, 200m, and 1000m are depicted). A statistically significant lack of roadkill, 'coldspots,' are in blue.

The strength of roadkill hotspots is a factor of the number of roadkill per unit length of roadway; if the number of roadkill decreases or the size of the scale increases, the strength of the hotspot will be reduced. Conversely, if the number of roadkill increase or the scale length decreases, the strength of the hotspot increases. Strength here is a measure of anomaly – how far outside the set confidence interval the value of the roadkill hotspot lies.

It is important to choose an appropriate scale (the diameter length containing the sum of roadkill data) to align with the practical considerations of roadkill mitigation structure and target animal in question (if present). The species in question and the area size of its range often dictate the scale used. Corresponding mitigation structures, e.g. fencing, would fence at minimum the length of the hotspot though likely more to avoid the ‘fence-end effect’ – fencing only the locations of roadkill hotspots is ineffective as the animal trying to cross would simply follow the fence to where it ends and cross there, creating a new hotspot.

In practice, monetary costs are levied on the tax payer, therefore efficiency with mitigating structures is key. The roadkill hotspot scale and subsequent mitigating structure scale is usually a compromise between ecology and economics.

=== Species ===
Varying animal types produce roadkill hotspots in different locations, making it a challenge for researchers to recommend specific locations for mitigation that benefit the entire ecosystem. As a result, specific species may receive priority or roadkill data may be combined along animal type or ecosystem role, e.g. birds, small mammals, reptiles, specialists, etc. Additionally, specific animal types require specific types of mitigation infrastructure, e.g. even if a bird and reptile hotspot overlaps, both require different types of fencing. Combining an endangered animal with roadkill data from its animal type serves to protect both the endangered and all members of its kind, though hotspot locations can fluctuate between individual species within the same family group.

=== Temporal nature of roadkill hotspots ===
Roadkill hotspots are dynamic – their presence fluctuates over time. Roadkill hotspot presence and strength is subject to seasonality, animal migration patterns, dispersal, feeding, breeding, and journeys taken to complete lifecycle needs; likewise, roadkill data used to determine roadkill hotspots should consider these factors. Road mortality surveys (researcher-conducted scanning of the roadway looking for roadkill) are most effective when adhering to a consistent and systematic protocol so that accumulated data are a good representation of the research site regardless of time.

Understanding roadkill hotspot variability over time is essential for mitigation purposes. For example, once hotspot seasonality is determined, warnings of potential animal crossings can be timed and delivered to motorists, increasing driver awareness. Studies have shown that permanent animal crossing signs are all but ignored by motorists.
