= Applied anthropology research methods =

Study of human societal and cultural development

Anthropology is the study of human societal and cultural development in the past, present, and future with a number of facets that are categorized into five different fields. These fields include: biological (physical) anthropology, cultural (socio-cultural) anthropology, linguistic anthropology (linguistics), archaeology, and applied anthropology. Applied anthropology is the analysis of human interaction with the purpose of solving practical problems that affect and arise throughout time between cultures and societies. Applied anthropologists use many different methods to conduct research on agriculture, health and medicine, housing, social services, political-economic development, displacement and resettlement, business and industry, education, nutrition, environment, and aging. Applied anthropology research methods are: policy research, evaluation research, cultural intervention, activist (action) research, participatory action research (PAR).

== Background and history ==
Applied anthropology was first established in the 19th century in Europe and continued to expand to other cultures around the world. Applied anthropology was first seen in North America by the Mexican government in 1917 and continues to grow. Applied anthropology was more prevalent after WWII, this was due to the loss of Britain's occupations in Africa, Asia, and the Caribbean. These regions were under British rule until the 1930s, and once that ended, societal and practical problems began to be observed. In 1941 in America, the Society of Applied Anthropology was established to further the practice of applied anthropology and created many projects to accumulate data. One of the most important and influential anthropologists, Franz Boas, was a pioneer in applied research methods and practices.

Boas was born 1858 and died in 1942. He contributed many practices and studies towards applied anthropology and is often referred to as the "Father of Modern Anthropology". Boas was one of the first to look at anthropology as a science and as a means of understanding the different cultures and people around the world. Prior anthropologists were likely artifact hunters and had no regard for the cultures that they were encountering. Some of Boas' work consisted of teaching and fieldwork, as well as six different trips to study the migratory movements of the Inuit, starting in 1886. Another important application of Boas was the four field discipline of anthropology in which he proclaimed that all sub-fields together were needed to paint an accurate picture of anthropological research.

Other anthropologists made contributions to early modern anthropology, like Bronislaw Malinowski, Margaret Mead, and Ruth Benedict. Malinowski's studies contributed the functional theory or functionalism, which is the idea that no matter the culture or civilization, societal institutions exist to help the individual meet their needs. Mead contributed to the idea of cultural determinism, which is the idea that culture shapes the way one thinks and behaves. Benedict contributed to the theory of cultural relativism by writing "Patterns of Culture" which elaborated on the idea that each culture is unique and can be fully understood if one studies a culture as a whole.

== Research methods ==
=== Policy research ===
Policy research, a research method used by applied anthropologists, uses ethnographic research to make suggestions about policies to policy-makers. Policy research also involves the use of press conferences or workshops to bring in individuals from communities to enlighten them on policy information. The policy information at these workshops or press conferences usually explain the effects of the policies and how it will affect the individuals involved. However, suggesting ways to execute policies and providing ethnographical data is as far as an applied anthropologist can go.

=== Evaluation research ===
Evaluation research is the study of evaluation or improvement of programs, projects, and organizations. These studies are an internal look into projects and organizations as to what is happening, who or what is involved, problems if any, and how to improve the project or program. Initially, applied anthropologists were only involved in observing and making suggestions about a program after the fact. Applied anthropologists now have taken an active role in corrective feedback and interventions. The evaluation of programs, projects, and organizations usually involves: cultural patterns, environmental conditions, processes, system models, networks, or any other factor that could be improved for a better outcome and consistency within an organization or project.

=== Cultural intervention ===
In cultural intervention, applied anthropologists directly involve themselves in the development, conduct, and evaluation of culturally-based, theory-driven interventions. Applied anthropologists also research cultural factors and their influence within the intervention as well as using this information to create intervention theories. Applied anthropologists must know a great amount about a program or movement to create an intervention based on cultural knowledge and theory development. Examples of this would be disease prevention interventions and social marketing research.

=== Advocacy, activist, action research ===
Activist, advocacy, action research is conducted by applied anthropologists by identifying, addressing, and critiquing imbalances in the division of power within society. This includes economic resources, social status, material goods, and any other good desired socially or economically within a society, community, or globally. Advocacy research is used to increase, organize, and create a movement within a community of the less fortunate or oppressed. Applied anthropologists engaged in advocacy research tend to have a liberal or critical view on the situation and due to that create culturally based theories that focus on structural barriers that cause social inequalities: gender, age, sexual preference, and ethnic group identification. Action research is the study of factors leading up to an action or event within society. Activist research is when applied anthropologists collaborate with communities affected by inequality and conducts research that furthers the political agenda of these oppressed communities.

=== Participatory (action) research ===
Participatory action research or PAR is a method in which applied anthropologists work closely with a community group because they are affected by inequities in health, housing, cultural conservation, or political participation. Applied anthropologists conduct research on locally to solve local problems with local partners. The ultimate goal of an applied anthropologist using PAR is to use the research found locally to either create programs or policies to better the locals.
