= Road ecology =

Study of the ecological effects of roads and highways

Road ecology is the study of the ecological effects (both positive and negative) of roads and highways (public roads). These effects may include local effects, such as on noise, water pollution, habitat destruction/disturbance and local air quality; and the wider environmental effects of transport such as habitat fragmentation, ecosystem degradation, and climate change from vehicle emissions.

The design, construction and management of roads, parking and other related facilities as well as the design and regulation of vehicles can change their effect. Roads are known to cause significant damage to forests, prairies, streams and wetlands. Besides the direct habitat loss due to the road itself, and the roadkill of animal species, roads alter water-flow patterns, increase noise, water, and air pollution, create disturbance that alters the species composition of nearby vegetation thereby reducing habitat for local native animals, and act as barriers to animal movements. Roads are a form of linear infrastructure intrusion that has some effects similar to infrastructure such as railroads, power lines, and canals, particularly in tropical forests.

Road ecology is practiced as a field of inquiry by a variety of ecologists, biologists, hydrologists, engineers, and other scientists. There are several global centers for the study of road ecology: 1) The Road Ecology Center at the University of California, Davis, which was the first of its kind in the world; 2) the Centro Brasileiro de Estudos em Ecologia de Estradas at the Federal University of Lavras, Brazil; 3) The Center for Transportation and the Environment, North Carolina State University; and 4) the Road Ecology Program at the Western Transportation Institute, Montana State University. There are also several important global conferences for road ecology research: 1) Infra-Eco Network Europe (IENE), which is international, but focused primarily on Europe; 2) International Conference on Ecology and Transportation (ICOET), which is also global in scope, but primarily focused on the US; 3) Australasian Network for Ecology & Transportation (ANET), which focuses on the Australasian (sub)continent; and 4) a potential Southern African road ecology conference, being considered by the Endangered Wildlife Trust.

== Air quality ==
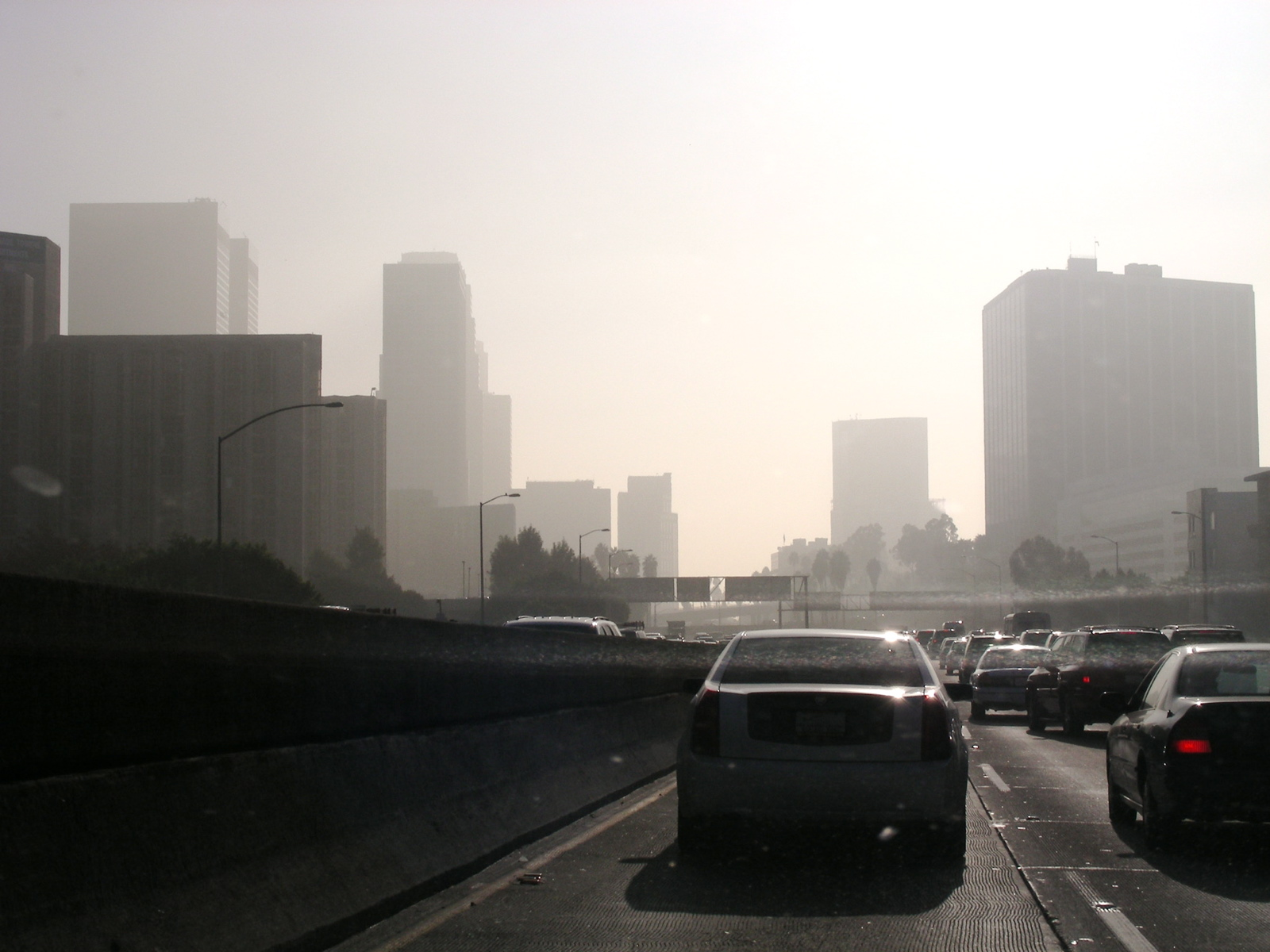
Air pollution along Pasadena Highway in Los Angeles, United States

Roads can have both negative and positive effects on air quality.

Air pollution from fossil (and some biofuel) powered vehicles can occur wherever vehicles are used and are of particular concern in congested city street conditions and other low speed circumstances. Emissions, also referred to as exhaust gas, include particulate emissions from diesel engines, NO_{x}, volatile organic compounds, carbon monoxide and various other hazardous air pollutants including benzene. Concentrations of air pollutants and adverse respiratory health effects are greater near the road than at some distance away from the road. Road dust kicked up by vehicles may trigger allergic reactions. Carbon dioxide is non-toxic to humans but is a major greenhouse gas and motor vehicle emissions are an important contributor to the growth of CO_{2} concentrations in the atmosphere and therefore to global warming.

The construction of new roads which divert traffic from populated areas can deliver a perceived improvement in air quality in the original area. However, new roads will typically lead to more overall emissions due to induced demand. The Environmental and Social Impact Assessment Study carried out for the development of the Tirana Outer Ring Road estimated that it would result in improved air quality in Tirana city center.

A new section of road being built near Hindhead, UK, to replace a four-mile section of the A3 road, and which includes the new Hindhead Tunnel, is expected by the government to deliver environmental benefits to the immediate area including the removal of daily congestion, the elimination of air pollution in Hindhead caused by the congestion, and the removal of an existing road which crosses the environmentally sensitive Devil's Punchbowl area.

== Hydrology ==
Urban runoff from roads and other impervious surfaces is a major source of water pollution. Rainwater and snowmelt running off of roads tends to pick up gasoline, motor oil, heavy metals, trash and other pollutants. Road runoff is a major source of nickel, copper, zinc, cadmium, lead and polycyclic aromatic hydrocarbons (PAHs), which are created as combustion byproducts of gasoline and other fossil fuels.

De-icing chemicals and sand can run off into roadsides, contaminate groundwater and pollute surface waters. Road salts (primarily chlorides of sodium, calcium or magnesium) can be toxic to sensitive plants and animals. Sand can alter stream bed environments, causing stress for the plants and animals that live there. Several studies have found a definite difference in physical properties of waters between catchments or hydric systems immediately adjacent to roads compared with those in environments further away from the studied roads. De-icing chemicals, salt, chlorides and the nutrients brought by particulate pollution such as nitrogen (N) and phosphorus (P) can trigger trophic cascades in adjacent waterways.

=== De-icing chemicals ===
The chemicals applied to roads along with grit for de-icing are primarily Salt and calcium chloride. Other chemicals such as urea are also used. These chemicals leave the road surface either in water runoff or in water spray. Apart from heavy metal bioaccumulation in adjacent plants, vegetation can be damaged by salt as far as 100 m (110 yd) from the road. Studies have found negative effects on wood frog population dynamics when tadpoles were raised in presence of most de-icing chemicals, such as decreased tadpole survival rates and modified sex ratios at maturity.

An increased level of chloride in water due to salt application to roads can be widespread in waterways, rather than a local phenomenon of the road edge itself.

== Noise ==
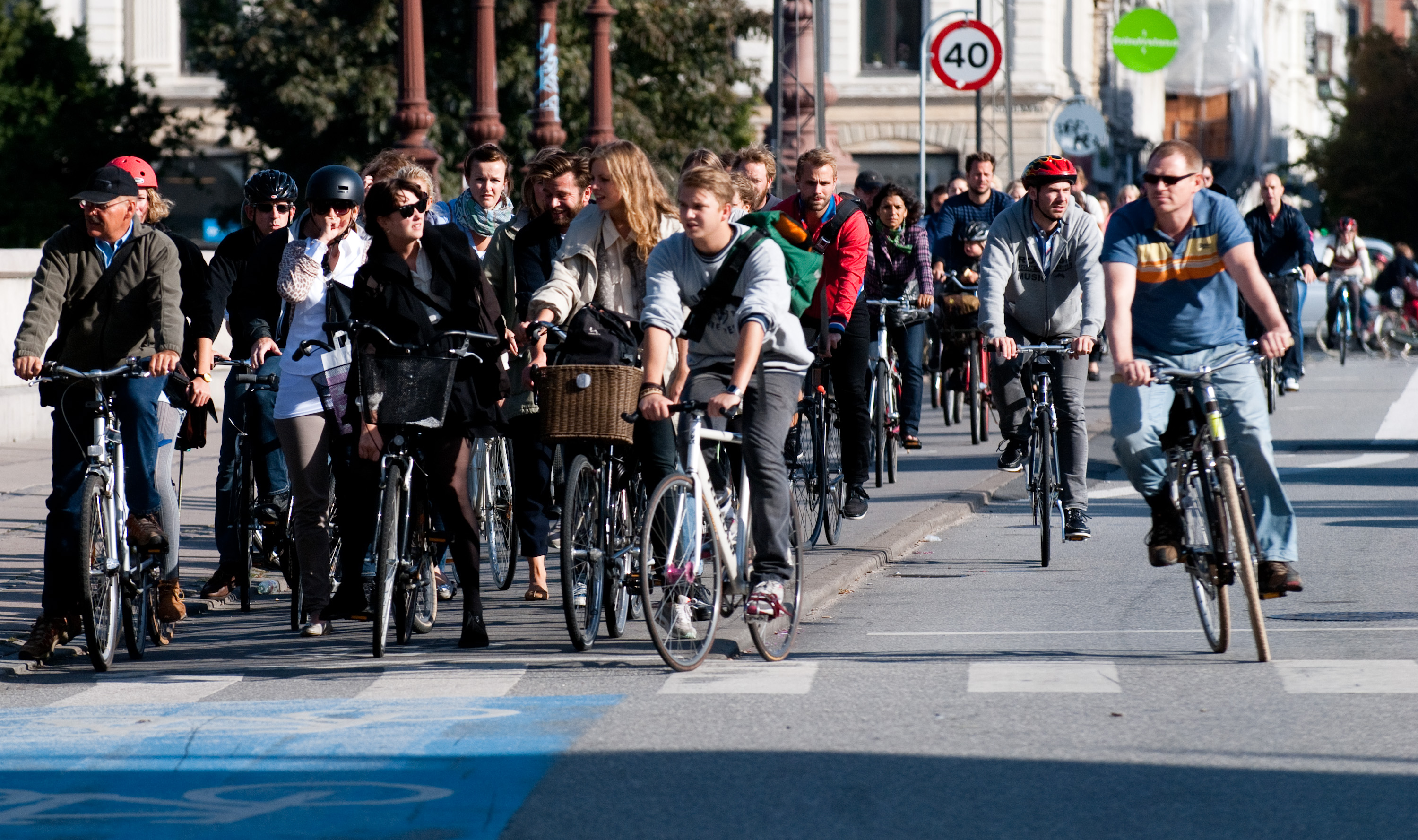
Conversation with other traffic users is possible with low traffic noise

Motor vehicle traffic on roads will generate noise, in a wide range of frequencies which can affect both humans and animals.

=== Negative effects ===
Noise pollution is a factor of environmental degradation that is often overlooked and typically seen as not having a significant effect, though traffic noise can contribute to numerous disturbances for wildlife. An increasing number of studies have been done on the effects of noise on wildlife. Both the sounds made by motors and the wind over moving vehicle structures, and the ultrasonic vibrations transmitted through the air and ground from vehicle passage can overlap with the frequency ranges and amplitudes used by animals for communication.

Several studies revealed that noise can have a negative effect, particularly on birds. Noise from major roads can interrupt or interfere with the calls of song birds, and their instinctive calls associated with mating, communication, migration, and other purposes are hindered by noise from roads. Birds in cities that are exposed to traffic noise sing higher-frequency songs which increases the amplitude of their songs so that they are more likely to be heard over the noise. One study did not necessarily directly provide a fatal effect for the tested birds, but the study showed that species abundance declined around major roads due to noise. Noise effects may also modify the behaviour of certain species, such as birds and their feeding behaviours. Birds may spend an increasing amount of time using visual scanning to spot predators as a result of auditory cues and alarm signals from other species being masked by noise pollution. A decreased amount of time spent feeding may lower the mean body weight of birds living near roads, which directly affects their survival rates in a negative fashion. Chronic traffic noise exposure hinders a bird's ability to respond to other common stress cues by lowering levels of stress-induced corticosterone (a measure of how strongly an organism responds to a stressor). This can be life-threatening if birds are not able to respond appropriately to a stress cue, such as a predator. In noisy environments, nestlings are less likely to beg when their parents arrive because traffic noise masks the sounds of their parents' arrival. This effect can lower rates of feeding, which leads to a reduction in nestling body size and chance of post-fledgling survival. Nestlings exposed to noise may also suffer from reduced immune function.

Road noise can be a nuisance if it impinges on population centres, especially for roads at higher operating speeds, near intersections and on uphill sections. Noise health effects can be expected in such locations from road systems used by large numbers of motor vehicles. Noise mitigation strategies exist to reduce sound levels at nearby sensitive receptors. The idea that road design could be influenced by acoustical engineering considerations first arose about 1973.

Speed bumps, which are usually deployed in built-up areas, can increase noise pollution. This is especially the case if large vehicles use the road and particularly at night.

=== Positive effects ===
New roads can divert traffic away from population centres thus relieving the noise pollution. A new road scheme planned in Shropshire, UK promises to reduce traffic noise in Shrewsbury town centre. In areas where most native forest has been cleared, roads can make it easier to move crops to market and import fertilizers. This can increase farm yields and profits.

== Effects on wildlife ==
=== Habitat fragmentation ===
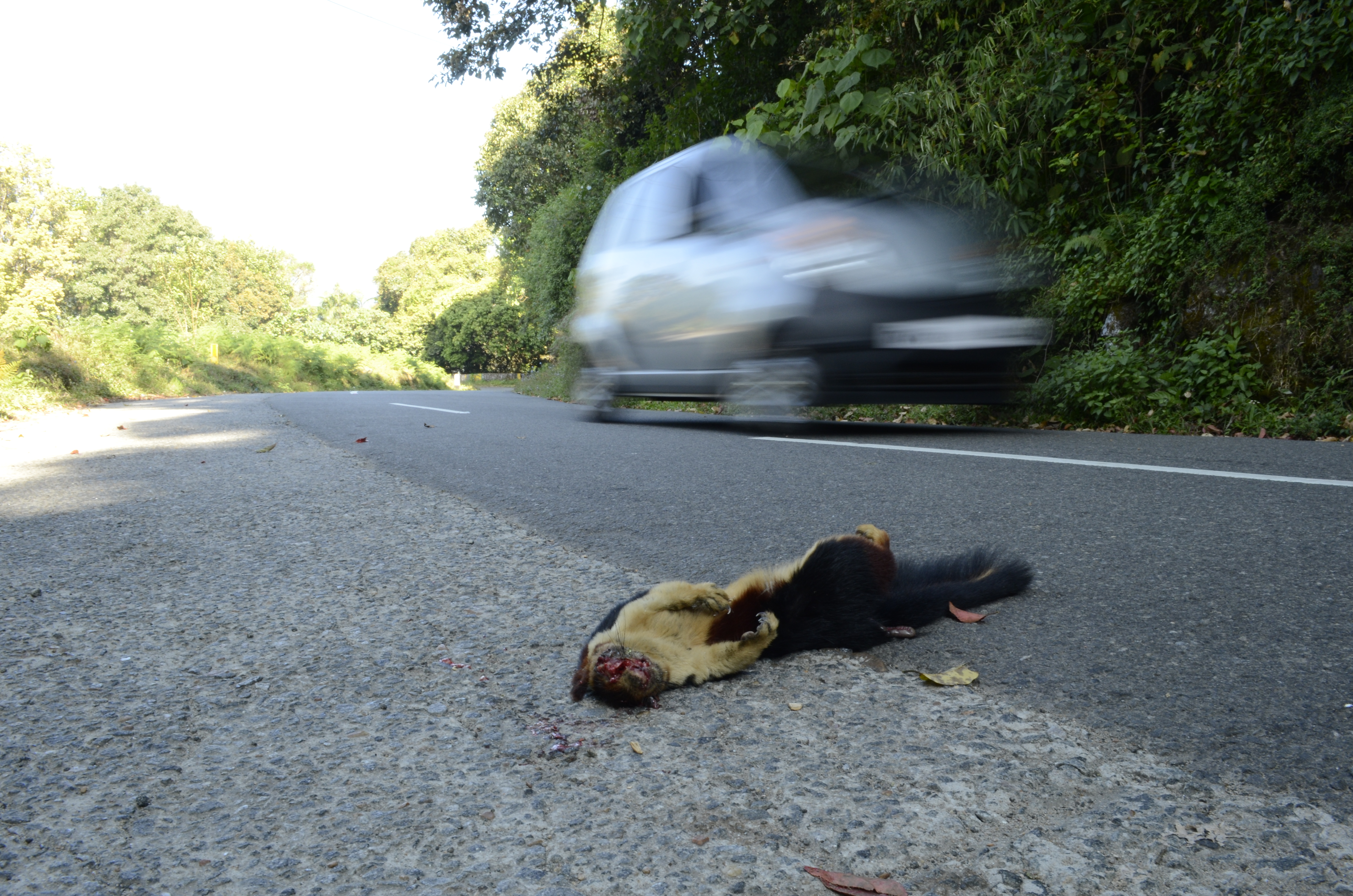
Indian giant squirrel, a tree dweller, killed on a road that has disrupted the rainforest canopy

Roads can act as barriers or filters to animal movement and lead to habitat fragmentation. Many species will not cross the open space created by a road due to the threat of predation and roads also cause increased animal mortality from traffic. This barrier effect can prevent species from migrating and recolonising areas where the species has gone locally extinct as well as restricting access to seasonally available or widely scattered resources.

Habitat fragmentation may also divide large continuous populations into smaller more isolated populations. These smaller populations are more vulnerable to genetic drift, inbreeding depression and an increased risk of population decline and extinction. Whether or not this effect is observed depends greatly on the size and mobility of the species in question and the spatial scale at which the fragmentation occurs. Fragmentation does not affect all species in the same way.

The presence of roads also decreases the amount of habitat accessible to species. This is to say that it decreases the amount of usable habitat available to organisms without crossing a road. That being said, whether a habitat on the other side of the road becomes inaccessible to an organism or not varies between species. Roads are a permeable barrier to some organisms and impermeable to others.

=== Amphibians and reptiles ===
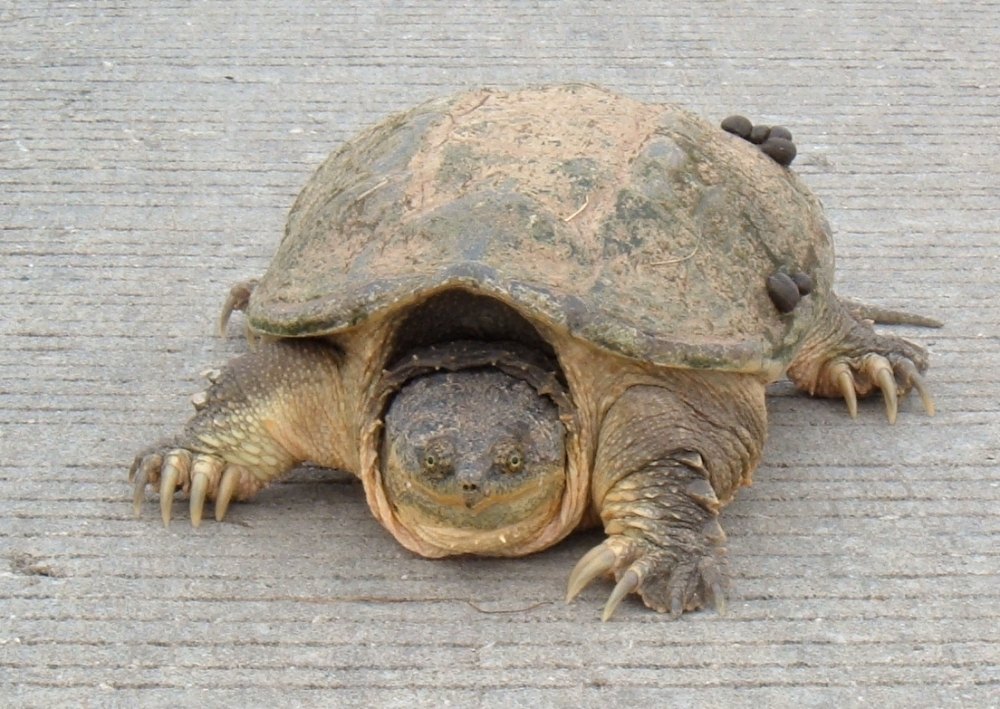
Snapping turtle (Chelydra serpentina) crossing a road

Roads can be particularly hazardous to populations of amphibians and reptiles that migrate to vernal pools, or to the gravel on road verges that several species try to use as nest sites. Reptiles' instinctive activities can lead them towards roads and lead to an increase in mortality rates: snakes, for example, may use roads as a source of heat for thermoregulation. Also some turtles have been noted to lay their eggs on road shoulders. Migratory patterns from season to season can also bring frogs and snakes into contact with roads and lead to an increase in their mortality rates.

=== Birds ===
The traffic load near large cities may show dramatic cyclical changes induced by weekend tourism, and this could induce cyclical changes in the activity patterns of birds. Road implantation may also lead birds to avoid certain sites, as they are seen as being less habitable (because of increases in noise and chemical pollution). Certain bird populations may then become confined into smaller habitable sites, leading to an increase in possibility of extinction caused by illness or habitat perturbation.

=== Facilitation of poaching of flora and fauna ===
Roads that run through forests that house edible animals may encourage or facilitate poaching. Especially in poor areas, the construction of roads has promoted not only poaching for personal consumption but also for sale (for consumption or as a pet) to third parties.

Similarly, the construction of roads in forested areas has also promoted illegal logging as it becomes easier for illegal loggers to transport the wood.

== Mitigation efforts ==
=== Awareness ===
Awareness needs to be spread among drivers particularly those driving on forest road on maintaining speed limits and being vigilant. Environment Conservation Group had initiated an awareness drive named PATH an acronym for Provide Animals safe Transit on Highways covering more than 17,000 km in India to highlighting the importance of safe driving on forest roads.

=== Road permeability ===
Wildlife crossings that allow animals to safely cross human-made barriers such as roads, are intended not only to reduce roadkill, but ideally to provide connectivity of habitat areas, combating habitat fragmentation. Wildlife crossings may include: underpass tunnels, viaducts, and overpasses.

=== Habitat construction and planting ===
In Washington County, North Carolina, along Highway 64, a study was conducted to analyze the effects of wildlife underpasses on the local wildlife. Three wildlife underpasses were built with fencing around the highway in the study zones. The study showed that deer used the underpasses the most and made up 93% of all crossings. Mortality rates were calculated and showed that the numbers of deaths were lower near underpasses. This cannot be said about all animals. Some have smaller home ranges so they were not inclined to travel to underpasses to cross the road. Underpass would most likely benefit larger mammals such as bears, deer, and cougars. Underpasses were seen to lower mortality rates and increase local species ability to adapt to a habitat along a major road.

Structural elements such as fencing or walls along road bridges can encourage birds and bats to fly higher over roads or underneath bridges, which lowers the chances of vehicle collisions. Some animals, such as birds, are more vulnerable to disturbances during certain periods of the year, such as the breeding season.

=== Recycling ===
Materials removed from a road can be reused in construction within the same project or in other locations. Road construction can also use waste materials from other industries.

Asphalt pavement is one of the most recycled materials in the United States. It is estimated that over 80% of asphalt pavement removed from roadways is reused as construction aggregate. It can be mixed into new pavement or used as a subbase or fill material. Similarly, concrete from road or building demolition can be an excellent source of aggregate.

Common examples of waste products used in road building include coal fly ash (used to make concrete stronger), asphalt shingles and shredded tires (used in asphalt pavement), ground glass and steel mill slag (used as aggregates).

In 2012, US asphalt plants used an estimated 68.3 million tons of reclaimed asphalt pavement, 1.86 million tons of recycled asphalt shingles, and over 1 million tons of other recycled materials to produce new asphalt.

== Positive impact of roads on the environment ==
High-speed highways may have some positive impact on nature only in the distant future:

- They can prevent the spread of forest and steppe fires;
- Expressways contribute to urbanization, in which millions of people move to richer large cities, and thousands of abandoned small impoverished settlements gradually disappear and become overgrown with dense forests;

== See also ==
- Acoustic ecology
- Anthropocene
- Congestion pricing
- Environmental effects of cars
- Environmental effects of transport
- Environmental effects of trucks
- Habitat fragmentation
- Low-emission zone
- Motor vehicle emissions
- Roads as extraction route for mines
- Population fragmentation
- Second-hand vehicle dumping
- Railroad ecology
- Rubberized asphalt
- Synanthrope
- Transport ecology
- Transport and the environment
- Wildlife crossing
- Wildland-urban interface
