= Landscape connectivity =

In landscape ecology, landscape connectivity is, broadly, "the degree to which the landscape facilitates or impedes movement among resource patches". Alternatively, connectivity may be a continuous property of the landscape and independent of patches and paths. Connectivity includes both structural connectivity (the physical arrangements of disturbance and/or patches) and functional connectivity (the movement of individuals across contours of disturbance and/or among patches). Functional connectivity includes actual connectivity (requires observations of individual movements) and potential connectivity in which movement paths are estimated using the life-history data.

A similar but different concept proposed by Jacques Baudry, landscape connectedness, refers to structural links between elements of spatial structures of a landscape, which concerns the topology of landscape features and not ecological processes.

== Definition ==
The concept of "landscape connectivity" was first introduced by Dr. Gray Merriam in 1984. Merriam noted that movement among habitat patches was not merely a function of an organism's attributes, but also, a quality of the landscape elements through which it must move. To emphasize this fundamental interaction in determining a particular movement pathway, Merriam (1984), defined landscape connectivity as "the degree to which absolute isolation is prevented by landscape elements which allow organisms to move among habitat patches." Nine years later, Merriam and colleagues, revised the definition to "the degree to which the landscape impedes or facilitates movement among resource patches.

Although this definition has undoubtedly become the most accepted and cited meaning within the scientific literature, many authors have continued to create their own definitions. With et al (1997), presented their interpretation as "the functional relationship among habitat patches, owing to the spatial contagion of habitat and the movement responses of organisms to landscape structure", and Ament et al. (2014) defined it as "the degree to which regional landscapes, encompassing a variety of natural, semi-natural, and developed land cover types, are conducive to wildlife movement and to sustain ecological processes."

Thus, although there have been many definitions of landscape connectivity over the past 30 years, each new description emphasizes both a structural and a behavioural element to the landscape connectivity concept. The physical component is defined by the spatial and temporal configuration of the landscape elements (landform, landcover and land use types), and the behavioural component is defined by the behavioural responses, of organisms and/or processes, to the physical arrangement of the landscape elements.

== Importance ==
Habitat loss and habitat fragmentation have become ubiquitous in both natural and human modified landscapes, resulting in detrimental consequences for local species interactions and global biodiversity.

Human development now modifies over 50% of the earth's landscape, leaving only patches of isolated natural or semi-natural habitats for the millions of other species we share this planet with. Loss of natural habitat and fluctuations in landscape patterns is one of the many problems in biogeography and conservation biology. Patterns of biodiversity and ecosystem functions are changing worldwide resulting in a loss of connectivity and ecological integrity for the entire global ecological network. Loss of connectivity can influence individuals, populations and communities through within species, between species, and between ecosystem interactions. These interactions affect ecological mechanisms such as nutrient and energy flows, predator-prey relationships, pollination, seed dispersal, demographic rescue, inbreeding avoidance, colonization of unoccupied habitat, altered species interactions, and spread of disease.

Accordingly, landscape connectivity facilitates the movement of biotic processes such as animal movement, plant propagation, and genetic exchange, as well as abiotic processes such as water, energy, and material movement within and between ecosystems.

== Types of animal movement ==
=== Daily movements ===
Within their home range or territory most animals must move daily among multiple primary habitat patches to forage for food and obtain all the resources they need.

=== Migration ===
Some species travel to different locations throughout the year to access the resources they need. These movements are usually predictable and are due to changes in the environmental conditions at the primary habitat site, or to facilitate access to breeding grounds. Migratory behaviour is seen in land animals, birds and marine species, and the routes they follow are usually the same year after year.

=== Dispersal ===
Is the once in a lifetime movement of certain individuals from one population to another for the purpose of breeding. These exchanges maintain genetic and demographic diversity among populations.

=== Disturbance movement ===
Is the unpredictable movement of individuals or populations to new locations of suitable habitat due to an environmental disturbance. Major disturbances such as fire, natural disasters, human development, and climate change can impact the quality and distribution of habitats and necessitate the movement of species to new locations of suitable habitat.

=== Incidental movement ===
Movement of species in areas that are typically used by humans. These include greenbelts, recreational trail systems, hedgerows, and golf courses.

== Connectivity conservation ==
Preserving or creating landscape connectivity has become increasingly recognized as a key strategy to protect biodiversity, maintain viable ecosystems and wildlife populations, and facilitate the movement and adaptation of wildlife populations in the face of climate change. The degree to which landscapes are connected determines the overall amount of movement taking place within and between local populations. This connectivity has influences on gene flow, local adaptation, extinction risk, colonization probability, and the potential for organisms to move and adapt to climate change. With habitat loss and fragmentation increasingly deteriorating natural habitats, the sizes and isolation of the remaining habitat fragments are particularly critical to the long-term conservation of biodiversity.

Thus, connectivity among these remaining fragments, as well as the characteristics of the surrounding matrix, and the permeability and structure of the habitat edges are all important for biodiversity conservation and affect the overall persistence, strength and integrity of the remaining ecological interactions.

== Quantifying landscape connectivity ==
Since the definition of landscape connectivity has both a physical and a behavioural component, quantifying landscape connectivity is consequently organism-, process- and landscape-specific. According to (Wiens & Milne, 1989), the first step in the quantification process of landscape connectivity is defining the specific habitat or habitat network of the focal species, and in turn, describe the landscape elements from its point of view.

The next step is to determine the scale of the landscape structure as perceived by the organism. This is defined as the scale at which the species responds to the array of landscape elements, through its fine-scale (grain), and large-scale (extent), movement behaviours. Lastly, how the species responds to the different elements of a landscape is determined. This comprises the species' movement pattern based on behavioural reactions to the mortality risk of the landscape elements, including habitat barriers and edges.

Landscape networks can be constructed based on the linear relationship between a species home range size and its dispersal distance. For example, small mammals will have a small range and short dispersal distances and large ones will have larger range and long dispersal distances. In short this relationship can help in scaling & constructing landscape networks based on a mammals body size.

For many organisms, particularly marine invertebrates, the scale of connectivity (usually in the form of larval dispersal) is driven by passive transport through ocean currents. Dispersal potential tends to be considerably higher in water than air due its higher density (and therefore higher buoyancy of propagules). It is therefore sometimes possible to quantify potential connectivity for marine organisms through process-based models such as larval dispersal simulations.

== Connectivity metrics ==
Although connectivity is an intuitive concept, there is no single consistently-used metric of connectivity. Theories of connectivity include consideration of both binary representations of connectivity through "corridors" and "linkages" and continuous representations of connectivity, which include the binary condition as a sub-set

Generally, connectivity metrics fall into three categories:

1. Structural connectivity metrics are based on the physical properties of landscapes, which includes the idea of patches (size, number of patches, average distance to each other) and relative disturbance (human structures such as roads, parcellization, urban/agricultural land-use, human population).
2. Potential connectivity metrics are based on the landscape structure as well as some basic information about the study organism's dispersal ability such as average dispersal distance, or dispersal kernel.
3. Actual (also called realized, or functional) connectivity metrics are measured based on the actual movements of individuals along and across contours of connectivity, including among patches (where these exist). This takes into account the actual number of individuals born at different sites, their reproduction rates, and mortality during dispersal. Some authors make a further distinction based on the number of individuals that not only disperse between sites, but that also survive to reproduce.

=== Data structures ===
Connectivity can usually be described as a graph or network, i.e. a set of nodes (possibly representing discrete populations or sampling sites) connected by edges (describing the presence or strength of connectivity). Depending on the type of connectivity being described, this could range from a simple undirected and unweighted graph (with edges perhaps representing the presence or absence of a shared species), to a directed, weighted, layered or temporal graph (with edges perhaps representing flows of individuals through time). Representing connectivity as a graph is often useful, both for data visualisation purposes, and analyses. For instance, graph theory algorithms are often used to identify central populations that maintain connectivity (betweenness centrality), or clusters of populations with strong intra-connectivity and weak inter-connectivity (modularity optimization).

Various data structures exist for storing and operating on graph data. Of particular note are array representations, often called connectivity matrices for two-dimensional arrays (as is usually the case for graphs without temporal variability). For example, the time-mean potential connectivity between a set of populations could be represented as a matrix $\mathbf{M}_{ij}$, with each element giving the dispersal ability from population $i$ to population $j$. Many ecological models rely on this matrix representation. For instance, the matrix product $\mathbf{M}_{ij}^n$ may represent the likelihood of dispersal from population $i$ to population $j$ over $n$ steps of dispersal and, when combined with other demographic processes, the eigenvalues of $\mathbf{M}_{ij}$ may represent the metapopulation growth rate.

== Software ==
Typically, the "natural" form of connectivity as an ecological property perceived by organisms is modeled as a continuous surface of permeability, which is the corollary to disturbance. This can be accomplished by most geographic information systems (GIS) able to model in grid/raster format. A critical component of this form of modeling is the recognition that connectivity and disturbance are perceived and responded to differently by different organisms and ecological processes. This variety in responses is one of the most challenging parts of attempting to represent connectivity in spatial modeling. Typically, the most accurate connectivity models are for single species/processes and are developed based on information about the species/process.

There is little, and often no evidence that spatial models, including those described here, can represent connectivity for the many species or processes that occupy many natural landscapes. The disturbance-based models are used as the basis for the binary representations of connectivity as paths/corridor/linkages through landscapes described below.

=== Circuitscape ===
Circuitscape is an open source program that uses circuit theory to predict connectivity in heterogeneous landscapes for individual movement, gene flow, and conservation planning. Circuit theory offers several advantages over common analytic connectivity models, including a theoretical basis in random walk theory and an ability to evaluate contributions of multiple dispersal pathways. Landscapes are represented as conductive surfaces, with low resistances assigned to habitats that are most permeable to movement or best promote gene flow, and high resistances assigned to poor dispersal habitat or to movement barriers. Effective resistances, current densities, and voltages calculated across the landscapes can then be related to ecological processes, such as individual movement and gene flow.

=== Graphab ===
Graphab is a software application devoted to the modelling of landscape networks. It is composed of four main modules: graph building, including loading the initial landscape data and identification of the patches and the links; computation of the connectivity metrics from the graph; connection between the graph and exogenous point data set; visual and cartographical interface. Graphab runs on any computer supporting Java 1.6 or later (PC under Linux, Windows, Mac...). It is distributed free of charge for non-commercial use.

== See also ==
- Habitat fragmentation
- Hardscape
- Landscape ecology
- Softscape
- Wildlife corridor
- Wildlife crossing
